= AirTran (disambiguation) =

AirTran Airways is a defunct North American low cost airline.

AirTran may also refer to:

- AirTran Holdings, a former airline holding company
- AirTran JetConnect, an outsourced and defunct brand operated by Air Wisconsin
- Vought Airtrans, a defunct automated people mover system at DFW Airport
