= AirTran JetConnect =

Regional airline of the United States (2002–2004)

IATA	ICAO	Call sign
ZW	AWI	WISCONSIN
- Founded: September 26, 2002 (as Air Wisconsin)
- Commenced operations: November 15, 2002
- Ceased operations: August 2004
- Operating bases: Atlanta; Baltimore; Milwaukee; Tampa
- Fleet size: 26
- Destinations: 18
- Parent company: AirTran Airways
- Traded as: NYSE: AAI
- Headquarters: Appleton, Wisconsin, U.S.
- Key people: Bob Fornaro (Chairman, President & CEO)

AirTran JetConnect was the brand name for AirTran Airways' regional airline service, which flew regional jet aircraft from AirTran's hub in Atlanta. Service was to short-haul markets where AirTran felt their Boeing 717 or Airbus A320 (with the latter type being operated by Ryan International for AirTran via contract) mainline jet aircraft were too large to economically operate.

The JetConnect service was provided by regional carrier Air Wisconsin, which operated ten Bombardier CRJ200 jets painted in full banner carrier AirTran livery with the subtle title branding JetConnect added next to the AirTran logo.

The last regional jet flight operated in August 2004.

== History ==
The agreement was officially announced on September 26, 2002, with service beginning on November 15, 2002. Initially, JetConnect flew to Greensboro, Pensacola, and Savannah, later expanding to a total of 18 cities across the eastern United States.

On March 5, 2004, AirTran announced that it would be ending its JetConnect service. The airline performed an economic analysis and determined it could operate the Boeing 717 more efficiently than the Canadair regional jets in short-haul markets. During the phasing-out process, Air Wisconsin returned all of its regional jets to the United Express fleet, repainting them in United Express livery. All aircraft were subsequently repainted in US Airways colors and Air Wisconsin then began operating entirely under the US Airways Express banner. US Airways then merged with American Airlines which resulted in Air Wisconsin currently operating as an American Eagle regional air carrier.

AirTran would again launch regional service from its then-hub in Milwaukee in December 2009 operated by SkyWest Airlines, but was not branded in the same way as the earlier service. Aircraft retained a generic SkyWest livery, and the operation was discontinued in September 2011.

== Destinations ==
=== United States ===
- Florida
  - Jacksonville (Jacksonville International Airport)
  - Miami (Miami International Airport)
  - Pensacola (Pensacola Regional Airport)
  - Tallahassee (Tallahassee Regional Airport)
  - Tampa (Tampa International Airport)
- Georgia
  - Atlanta (Hartsfield-Jackson Atlanta International Airport) Hub
  - Savannah (Savannah/Hilton Head International Airport)
- Illinois
  - Bloomington/Normal (Central Illinois Regional Airport)
  - Moline/Rock Island/Bettendorf, Iowa/Davenport, Iowa (Quad City International Airport)
- Kansas
  - Wichita (Mid-Continent Airport)
- Maryland
  - Baltimore (Baltimore-Washington International Thurgood Marshall Airport)
- Missouri
  - Kansas City (Kansas City International Airport)
- New York
  - Rochester (Greater Rochester International Airport)
- North Carolina
  - Greensboro/High Point/Winston-Salem (Piedmont Triad International Airport)
  - Raleigh (Raleigh-Durham International Airport)
- Ohio
  - Dayton (Dayton International Airport)
- South Carolina
  - Myrtle Beach (Myrtle Beach International Airport)
- Wisconsin
  - Appleton (Outagamie County Regional Airport)
  - Milwaukee (General Mitchell International Airport)

== See also ==
- List of defunct airlines of the United States
