= ValuJet Airlines =

Ultra low-cost airline of the United States (1992–1997)

IATA	ICAO	Call sign
J7	VJA	CRITTER
- Founded: 1992; 34 years ago (in Georgia, U.S.)
- Commenced operations: October 26, 1993; 33 years ago
- Ceased operations: November 17, 1997; 28 years ago (rebranded as AirTran Airlines); August 1999; 27 years ago (merged into AirTran Airways)
- Operating bases: Atlanta; Boston; Miami; Orlando; Philadelphia; Washington–Dulles
- Headquarters: Clayton County, Georgia, United States
- Key people: Robert Priddy (Chairman); Maurice J. Gallagher Jr. (President & CEO)
- Website: valujet.com (1997 archive)

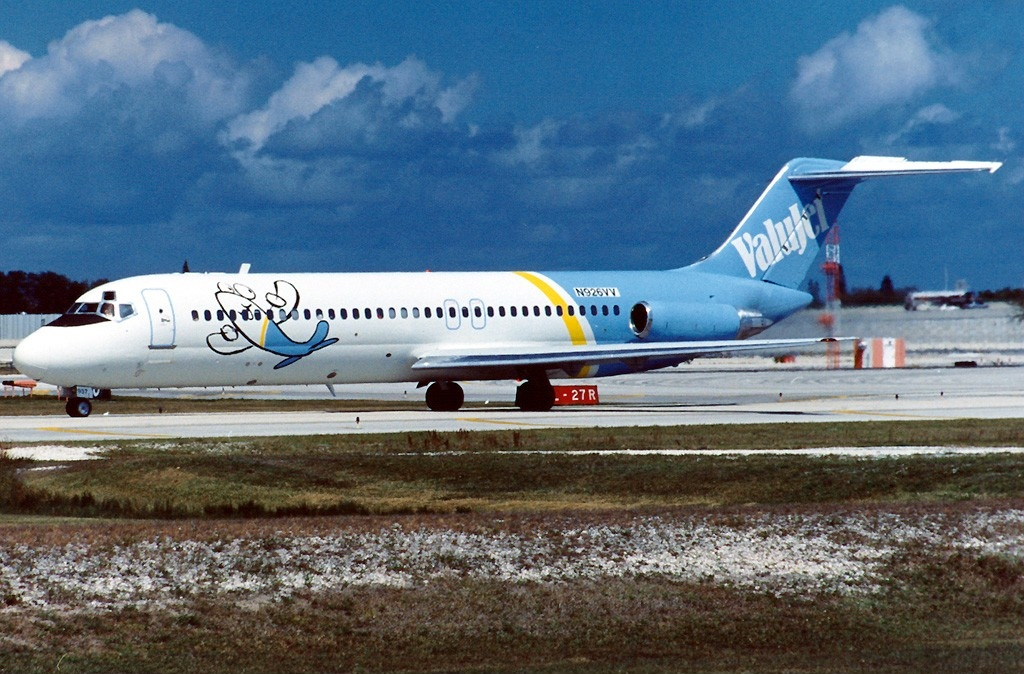
A McDonnell Douglas DC-9-32 of Valujet at Fort Lauderdale–Hollywood International Airport, March 1995

ValuJet Airlines was an ultra low-cost airline in the United States that operated from 1992 until 1997, when it was rebranded as AirTran Airlines after joining forces with AirTran Airways. It was headquartered in unincorporated Clayton County, Georgia and operated regularly scheduled domestic and international flights in the Eastern United States and Canada during the 1990s. The company was founded in 1992 and was notorious for its sometimes dangerous cost-cutting measures. All of the airline's planes were purchased used from other airlines; very little training was provided to workers; and contractors were used for maintenance and other services. In 1995, the military refused the company's bid to fly military personnel due to safety concerns. By 1996, ValuJet's safety record was so poor that officials at the FAA wanted the airline grounded.

After the crash of Flight 592 in 1996, which was caused by illegally and improperly stored hazardous materials on board, the airline was grounded the next month and not allowed to fly again until September of that same year, with a greatly reduced fleet. The airline's major customers never returned, and the company suffered major losses.

In 1997, ValuJet purchased the much smaller AirTran Airways. Although ValuJet was the nominal survivor, executives believed that a new name was important to regain passenger traffic, so the new company adopted the AirTran name in a reverse takeover. After the sale, AirTran made little mention of its past as ValuJet. AirTran was bought by Southwest Airlines in 2011 and ended flights in 2014.

== Company culture and branding ==
ValuJet was comparatively informal to many U.S. airlines of the period. The airline's flight attendant uniform, as detailed in company policy manuals, defined casual clothing items such as short or long sleeved polo shirts, sweaters, and jackets. Flight attendants were permitted to wear either shorts or trousers with white sneakers.

The airline's branding featured a smiling cartoon airplane mascot named Critter, which appeared across ValuJet's marketing materials, uniforms, and aircraft livery. The name of the character was also adopted as the airline's air traffic control callsign.

== History ==
=== Inception ===
ValuJet was founded in 1992 and began operations on October 26, 1993. It originally offered service from Atlanta to Orlando, Jacksonville, and Tampa with a single McDonnell Douglas DC-9-32 that previously belonged to Delta Air Lines. The first flight, Flight 901, flew from Atlanta to Tampa. The carrier was headed by a group of industry veterans including co-founder and chairman Robert Priddy, who had started a string of successful airlines including Atlantic Southeast Airlines (ASA), Air Midwest, and Florida Gulf Airlines. Board members Maury Gallagher and Tim Flynn, the other co-founders, developed and ran WestAir before selling it to Mesa Airlines; former Continental Airlines and Flying Tigers President Lewis Jordan joined the carrier a short time later as president.

The airline went public in June 1994 after a year of tremendous growth with the addition of 15 aircraft since the first flight in 1993. It became the fastest airline to make a profit in the history of American aviation, earning $21 million in 1994 alone. In October 1995, ValuJet placed an order with McDonnell Douglas for 50 MD-95 jets (now known as the Boeing 717) with an option for 50 more. Keeping costs low, the airline bought many used aircraft from around the world. At the time ValuJet's fleet was among the oldest in the United States, averaging 26 years. In 1995, the airline sued Delta Air Lines and TWA over landing slots.

Like most low-cost airlines, ValuJet did not own any hangars or spare parts inventories. Moreover, many of the measures it took to hold down fares were very aggressive even by low-cost standards. For example, it required pilots to pay for their own training and only paid them after completed flights. It gave its flight attendants only basic training. It also outsourced many functions other airlines handle themselves. For instance, it subcontracted maintenance to several companies, and these companies in turn subcontracted the work to other companies. Whenever delays were caused by mechanics, ValuJet cut the pay of the mechanics working on that plane.

=== Safety problems ===
In August 1995, the United States Department of Defense (DoD) rejected ValuJet's bid to fly military personnel, citing serious deficiencies in ValuJet's quality assurance procedures.

The Federal Aviation Administration's (FAA) Atlanta field office sent a memo on February 14, 1996, to its headquarters in Washington, D.C., stating that "consideration should be given to an immediate FAR 121 re-certification of this airline"—in other words, the FAA wanted ValuJet grounded. ValuJet airplanes made 129 emergency landings: fifteen in 1994, 57 in 1995, and 57 from January through May 1996. In February, the FAA ordered ValuJet to seek approval before adding any new aircraft or cities to their network, something the industry had not seen since deregulation in 1979. This attempt at removing ValuJet's certification was "lost in the maze at FAA" according to NTSB Chairman Jim Hall. By this time, ValuJet's accident rate was not only one of the highest in the low-fare sector, but was more than 14 times that of the legacy airlines.

=== Fallout from the crash of Flight 592 ===
On May 11, 1996, ValuJet suffered its highest-profile accident when Flight 592, a DC-9-32 flying from Miami to Atlanta, crashed into the Florida Everglades; all 110 people on board died. The crash was caused by an onboard fire triggered by full but expired chemical oxygen generators illegally stowed in the cargo hold without safety caps. The generators were put on the plane by maintenance subcontractor SabreTech. The resulting investigation revealed numerous systemic flaws, and ultimately faulted both SabreTech, for storing the generators on the plane, and ValuJet for not supervising them.

After the crash, many of ValuJet's other cost-cutting practices came under scrutiny. One of its planes flew 140 times despite a leaky hydraulic system, and another flew 31 times with malfunctioning weather radar. A third plane was allowed to fly despite engine rust that went unnoticed during its refit; it caught fire a few months later and was completely destroyed. At the time of the crash, the FAA was in the final stages of a three-month review of ValuJet's operations. The Department of Transportation originally wanted to give ValuJet a clean bill of health. However, after the department's Inspector General, Mary Schiavo, strongly objected to allowing ValuJet to stay in the air, the FAA grounded ValuJet on June 11, 1996.

On September 26, 1996, ValuJet resumed flying with 15 jets, down from 52 before the crash, after complying with all DOT and FAA requirements. On November 4, 1996, ValuJet announced that Joseph Corr, the former CEO of Continental Airlines, would become CEO and President at a time when the airline was in serious trouble. Its highest-paying customers never returned, however, and the airline had lost $55 million since the crash of Flight 592. After the large amount of negative publicity surrounding the Flight 592 incident, ValuJet suffered serious financial problems.

On July 11, 1997, the airline announced that it would merge with the much smaller Airways Corporation, parent of AirTran Airways; the merger was completed on November 17, 1997. Airways Corporation merged into the ValuJet's holding company, ValuJet, Inc. The merged company retained ValuJet's pre-1997 stock price history, but changed its name to AirTran Holdings. In November 1997, AirTran Holdings announced it would move its headquarters from Atlanta to Orlando.

ValuJet Airlines was renamed AirTran Airlines after the merger. All fleet and operations were transferred to AirTran Airways in 1998, and the ValuJet Airlines/AirTran Airlines operating certificate was surrendered. ValuJet's legal existence ended in 1999 when AirTran Airlines merged into AirTran Airways. However, while the merged airline operated under AirTran's FAA certificate, it retained ValuJet's stock price history and was initially headed by ValuJet's management team. Thus, ValuJet was the nominal corporate survivor.

AirTran, prior to its purchase by Southwest, made no notable mention of the ValuJet past. Instead, AirTran kept a large cache of ValuJet memorabilia, including radio ads, locked in an Atlanta warehouse. AirTran also opted not to make any major announcements on the crash's tenth anniversary out of respect for the victims' families.

== Fleet ==
ValuJet operated an all-McDonnell Douglas fleet of aircraft consisting of McDonnell Douglas DC-9s, along with a few McDonnell Douglas MD-80s. Most of the aircraft purchased were more than 15 years old, obtained used from other carriers from around the world. ValuJet had on average one of the oldest fleets in America, averaging 27 years. All the planes were painted white with blue and yellow trim, with the smiling "Critter" painted on both sides of the plane on the front. All aircraft were in a single class configuration.

ValuJet was originally the launch customer of the MD-95, but the airline and the manufacturer of the would-be jet ceased operations before any were delivered.

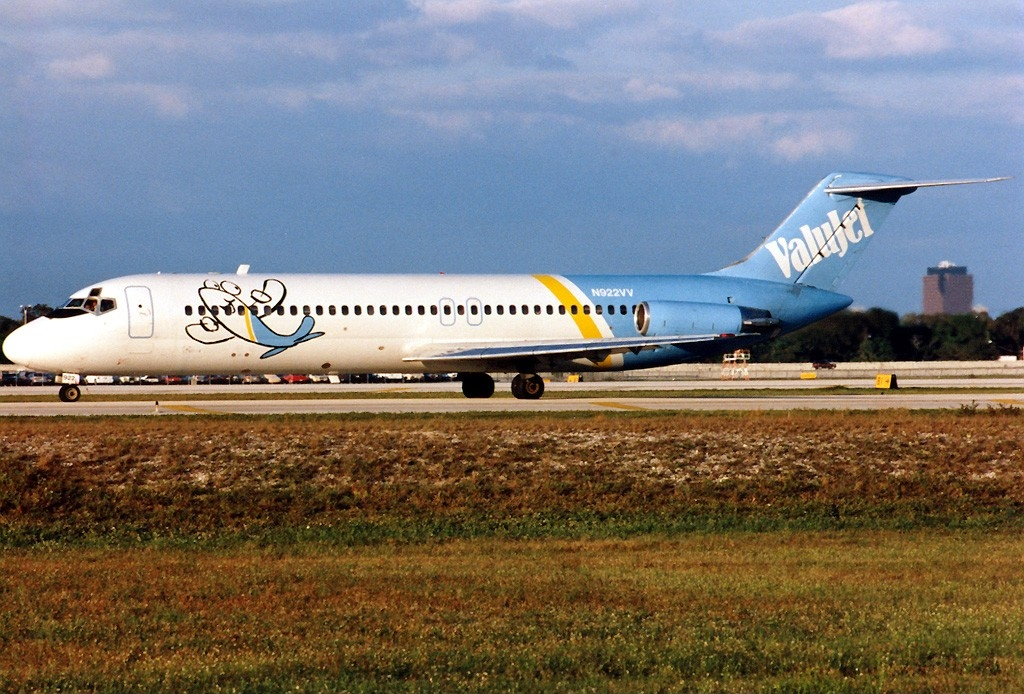
A ValuJet DC-9-32

At its peak, the fleet consisted of:

- 2 - McDonnell Douglas DC-9-21
- 42 - McDonnell Douglas DC-9-32 (2 lost, Flight 597 and Flight 592)
- 1 - McDonnell Douglas MD-81
- 2 - McDonnell Douglas MD-82
- 1 - McDonnell Douglas MD-83
- 50 - McDonnell Douglas MD-95 (previously on order)

== Destinations ==
ValuJet's main hub was in Atlanta and their focus cities were Orlando, Philadelphia, Boston, Miami, and Washington Dulles. Before the crash of Flight 592, ValuJet operated to 22 cities in the U.S. and one in Canada. Most people chose ValuJet for their low fares, such as $39 tickets for a flight from Atlanta to Jacksonville.

== Accidents and incidents ==
=== Flight 597 ===
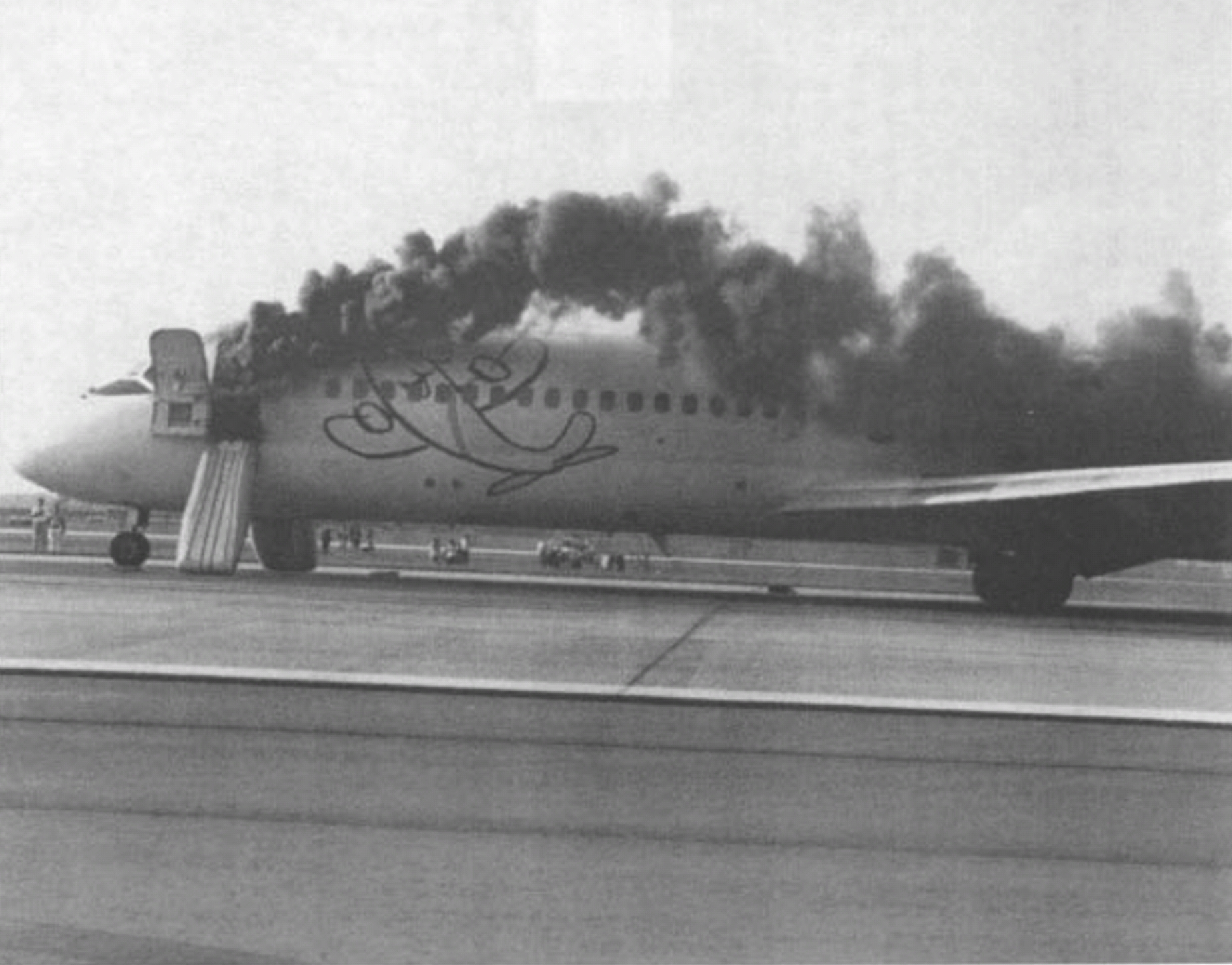
The DC-9-32 from Flight 597 in flames, June 1995

On June 8, 1995, a DC-9-32, aborted its takeoff from Hartsfield–Jackson Atlanta International Airport after a catastrophic engine failure caused by a stress crack in a compressor blade that occurred when the blade was made. Shrapnel from the right engine penetrated the fuselage and the right engine main fuel line, and a cabin fire erupted. The airplane was stopped on the runway, and captain Greg Straessle, 45, ordered an evacuation of the airplane. The plane was on a scheduled flight to Miami International Airport.

The resulting fire destroyed the aircraft. Among the five crew members, one flight attendant received serious puncture wounds from shrapnel and thermal injuries, and another flight attendant received minor injuries. Of the 57 passengers on board, five suffered minor injuries. The National Transportation Safety Board (NTSB) determined that the engine failure was caused by a detectable crack in a compressor disk, on which Turkish Airlines, the engine's previous owner, had failed to perform a proper inspection and had kept poor records. The incident resulted in the NTSB issuing an advisory recommending improvements to maintenance rules throughout the industry.

=== Flight 592 ===
Another DC-9-32, crashed in the Florida Everglades on Saturday, May 11, 1996, due to a fire caused by the activation of chemical oxygen generators that were illegally shipped in the cargo hold by ValuJet's maintenance contractor, SabreTech. The fire damaged the airplane's flight control cables, which led to the crew losing control of the aircraft, resulting in the deaths of all 110 people on board. The airplane was on its way from Miami to Atlanta. This accident also contributed to ValuJet voluntarily suspending operations for several months in 1996 before resuming operations as a much smaller airline.

== See also ==
- List of defunct airlines of the United States
