= Air Wisconsin =

Regional airline based out of Appleton, Wisconsin, United States

Air Wisconsin Airlines

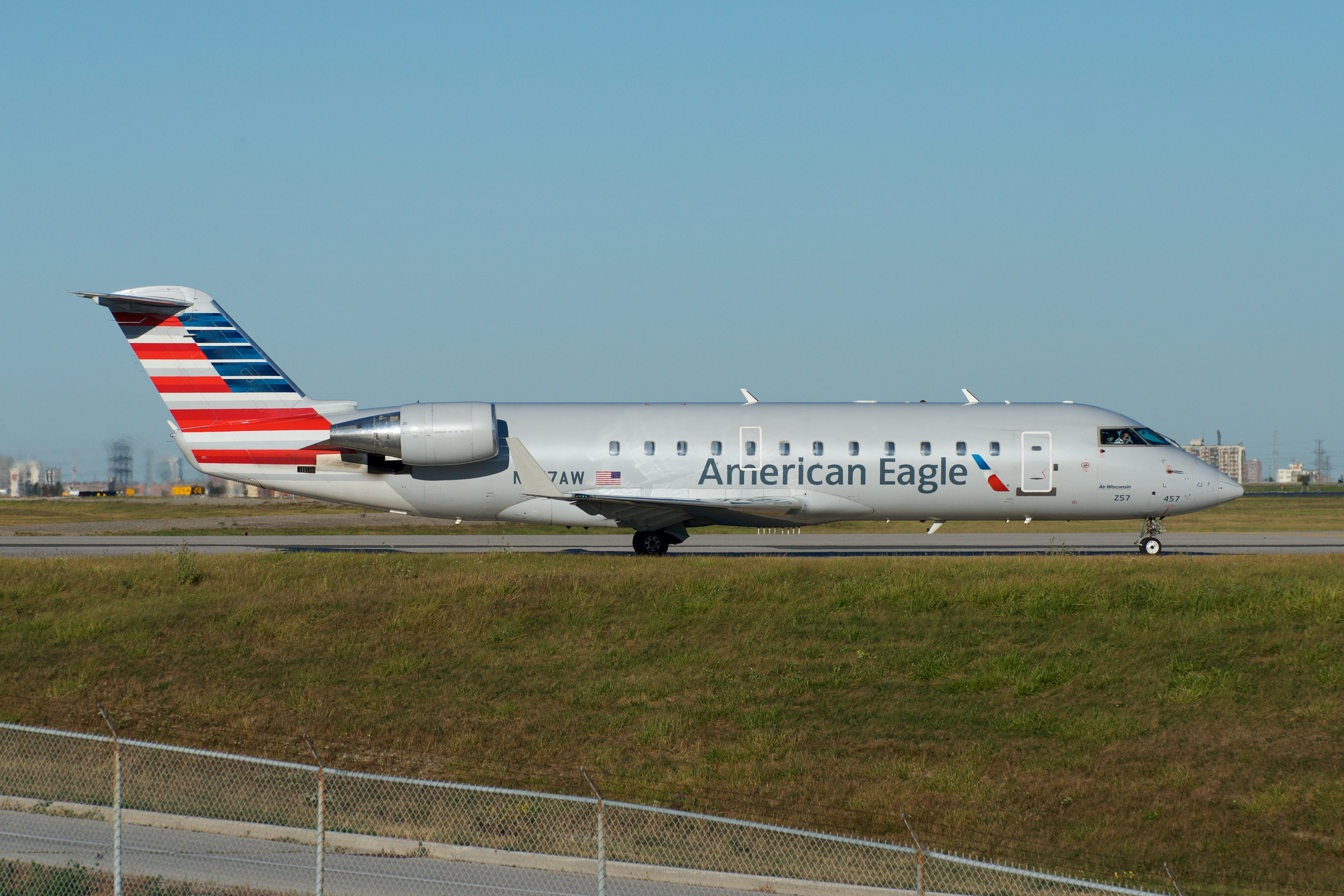
- Bombardier CRJ-200 operated by Air Wisconsin for American Eagle
IATA	ICAO	Call sign
ZW	AWI	WISCONSIN
- Founded: November 18, 1963; 62 years ago
- Commenced operations: August 23, 1965; 61 years ago
- AOC #: A6WA683W
- Hubs: Chicago–O'Hare
- Fleet size: 12 CRJ-200s (30 more in storage at ROW)
- Parent company: CSI aviation
- Traded as: OTCID Basic: HRBR
- Headquarters: Greenville, Wisconsin, U.S.
- Key people: Robert Binns (Former President & Former CEO)
- Employees: over 300 (employees have been recalled)
- Website: www.airwis.com

Air Wisconsin Airlines is a charter airline based at Appleton International Airport in the town of Greenville, Wisconsin near Appleton, Wisconsin. The company began operations in 1965 and became a United Express feeder carrier on behalf of United Airlines in 1985. The partnership with United ended in 2005 at which time the airline became a feeder for US Airways, operating as US Airways Express. When US Airways merged into American Airlines in 2015, Air Wisconsin became an American Eagle affiliate. From March 2018 to April 2023, Air Wisconsin returned to operating as a United Express carrier, with hubs at Chicago–O'Hare International Airport (ORD) and Washington–Dulles. In April 2023, it shifted back once again to operating only for American Eagle. The agreement with American concluded on April 3, 2025, after which the airline has been in transition to only flying charter and Essential Air Service subsidized flights.

== History ==
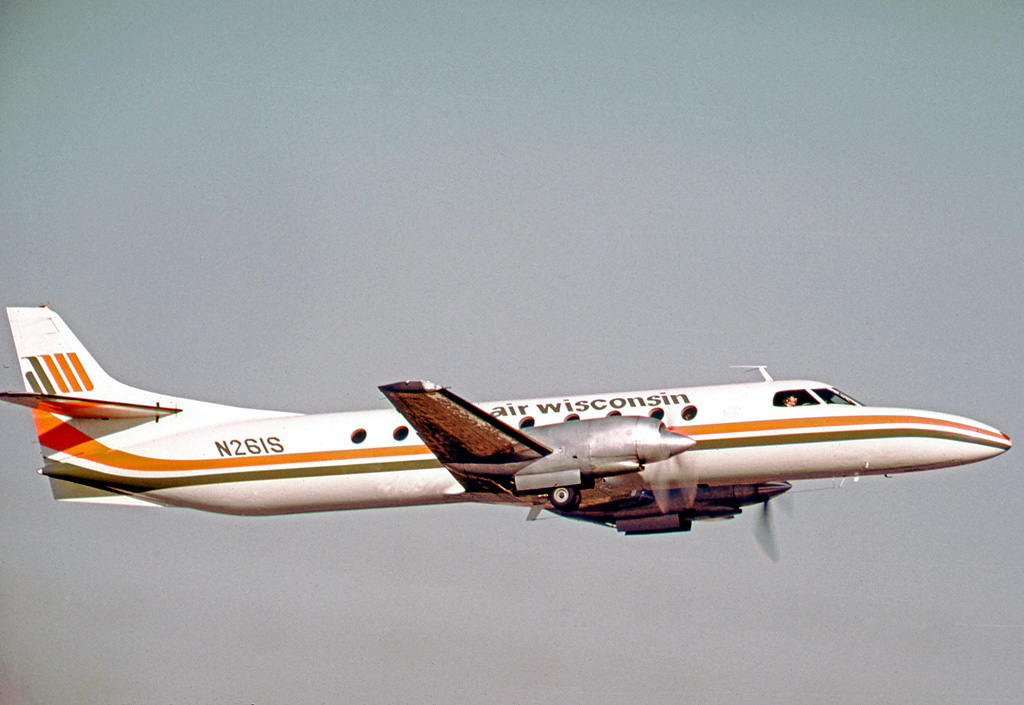
Air Wisconsin Fairchild Metroliner, 1973

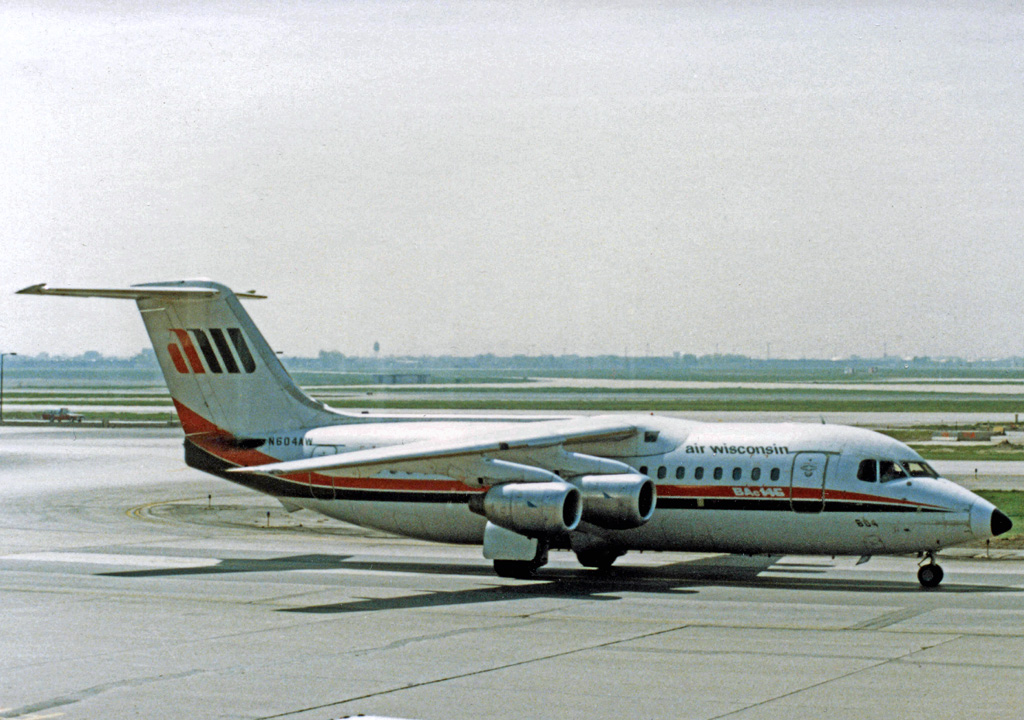
Air Wisconsin BAe 146–200 at Chicago–O'Hare in 1987

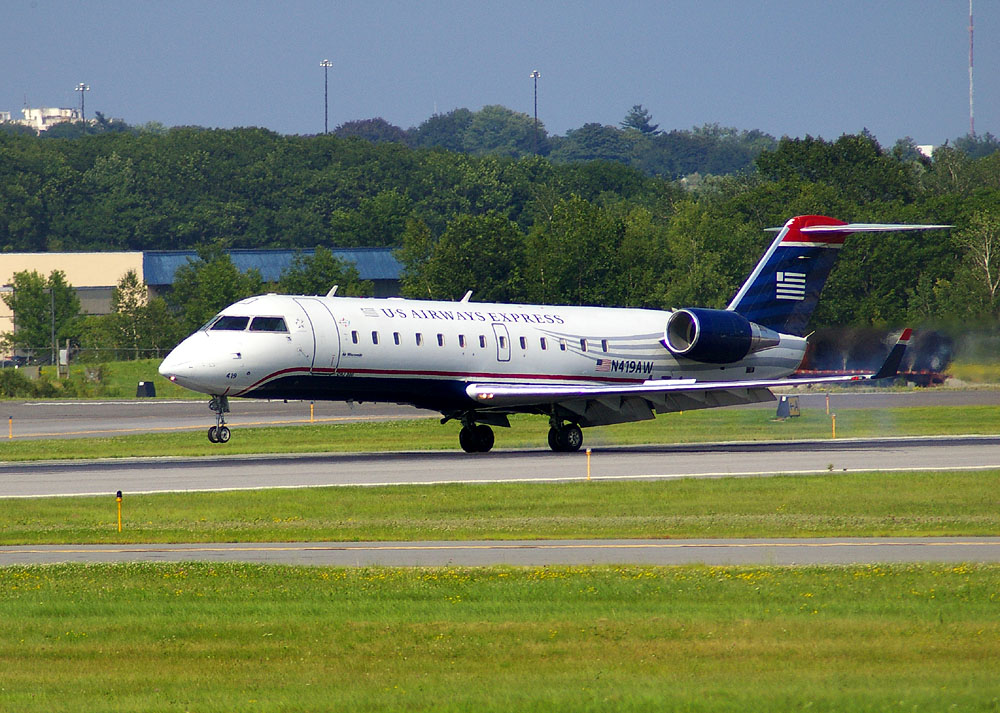
US Airways Express CRJ200 operated by Air Wisconsin at Portland (Maine)

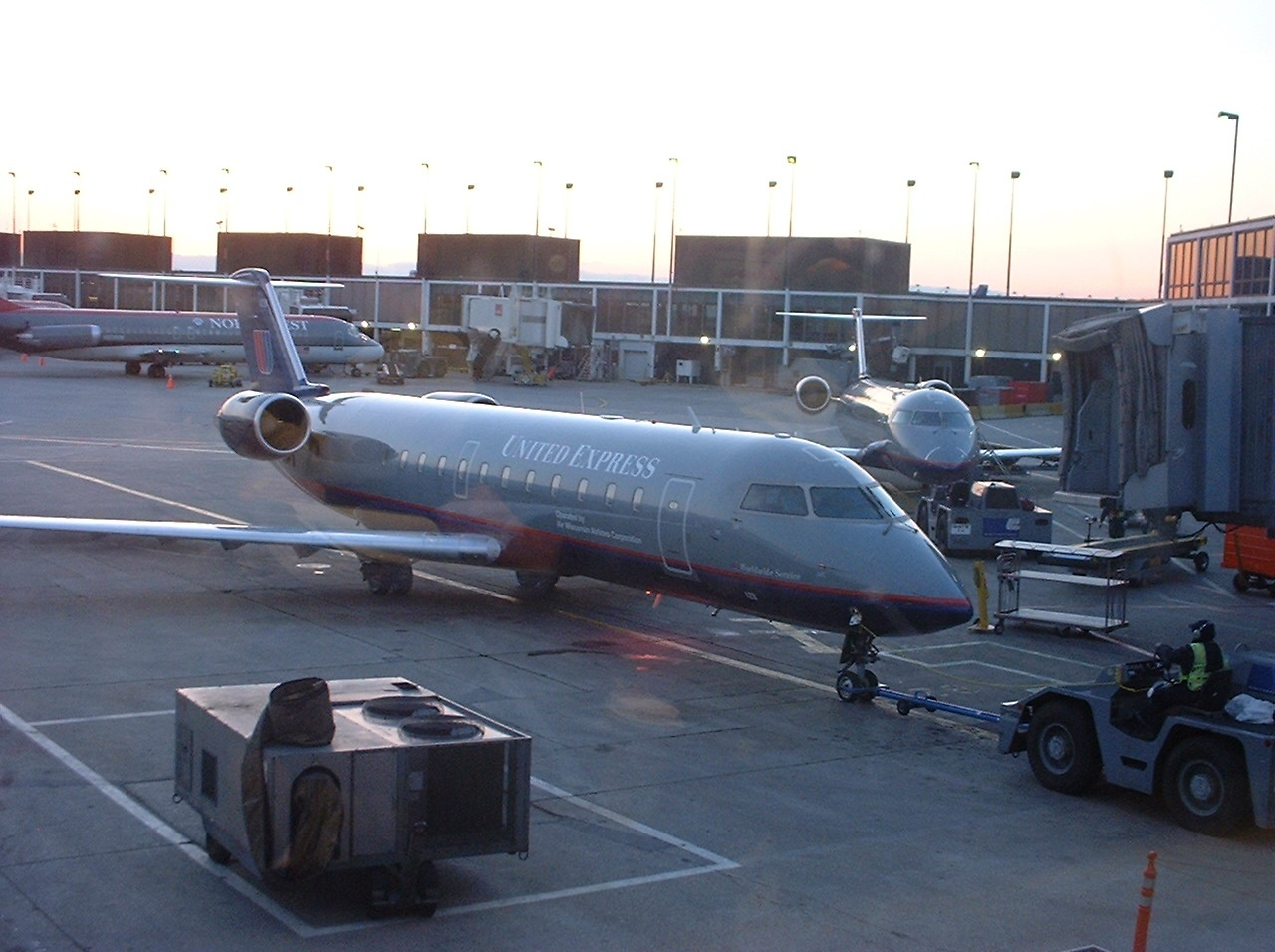
Former United Express CRJ200 operated by Air Wisconsin at Chicago–O'Hare

In 1963, investors from the Fox Cities raised $110,000 to start a new airline. The airline was established as an independent commuter air carrier in 1965 and started operations on August 23, 1965, just one day after the brand new Outagamie County Regional Airport was opened using de Havilland Dove commuter aircraft configured with nine passenger seats. It was founded to connect Appleton with Chicago and initially had 17 employees and two de Havilland Dove aircraft. According to an Air Wisconsin timetable of August 23, 1965, the airline was flying one route between Appleton and Chicago–O'Hare with four round trips on weekdays and two round trips on Saturdays and Sundays operated with the British-manufactured Dove twin prop aircraft.

By the mid 1970s, Air Wisconsin was flying two small commuter turboprop airliner types, the de Havilland Canada DHC-6 and Fairchild Metroliner, and was operating a small hub at Chicago's O'Hare Airport with service primarily to destinations in Indiana, Michigan, and Wisconsin as well as to Minneapolis/Saint Paul from several small cities in Wisconsin.

In September 1978 the airline was certified by the Civil Aeronautics Board (CAB) as a regional air carrier (Air Wisconsin previously had commuter air carrier status with the CAB). In October 1978 it had over $10 million in assets. Joining Air Wisconsin in 1965 as traffic manager and eventually becoming president, Preston H. Wilbourne's leadership oversaw Air Wisconsin grow to an airline serving 29 cities in an eleven state area with 32 aircraft boarding over 10,000 passengers daily. Air Wisconsin gained the nicknames "Air Willy" and "Rag Tag".

By 1985, Air Wisconsin had become a large independent regional air carrier operating BAe 146–200 and British Aircraft Corporation BAC One-Eleven jets as well as de Havilland Canada Dash 7 turboprops with flights as far west as Grand Island, Nebraska, and Minneapolis/Saint Paul, and as far east as Bridgeport and New Haven, Connecticut, with a large connecting hub located at Chicago's O'Hare Airport (ORD). By early 1986, the airline was serving sixteen airports with its British-manufactured jets with flights to Appleton, Bridgeport, Cedar Rapids, Iowa, Chicago–O'Hare, Flint, Michigan, Fort Wayne, Indiana, Grand Island, Green Bay, Wisconsin, Kalamazoo, Michigan, Lincoln, Nebraska, Moline, Illinois/Quad Cities, New Haven, South Bend, Indiana, Toledo, Ohio, Waterloo, Iowa, and Wausau/Stevens Point, Wisconsin, Oshkosh, Wisconsin, with other flights and destinations in its route system being served with the Canadian-manufactured four engine Dash 7 turboprop.

Air Wisconsin pioneered the concept of code sharing on behalf of United Airlines when the carrier began operating as United Express on May 1, 1985. As an independent air carrier prior to its business agreement with United to provide passenger feed, Air Wisconsin rapidly became the nation's largest regional airline in the 1980s. On May 17, 1985, it merged with Mississippi Valley Airlines (MVA) and continued to fly as United Express, operated by Air Wisconsin.

By late 1989 Air Wisconsin was operating United Express code share service from two United hubs: Chicago–O'Hare (ORD) and Washington–Dulles (IAD). According to the Official Airline Guide (OAG) at this time, United Express flights were operated with BAe 146–200 jets and Fokker F27 turboprops nonstop to Chicago–O'Hare from Akron/Canton, Ohio, Appleton, Cedar Rapids, Champaign, Illinois, Fort Wayne, Green Bay, Kalamazoo, La Crosse, Wisconsin, Lansing, Michigan, Lexington, Kentucky, Moline/Quad Cities, Oshkosh, Wisconsin, Peoria, Illinois, Roanoke, Virginia, South Bend, Toledo, and Wausau, and with BAe 146–200 jets and Short 360 turboprops nonstop to Washington Dulles from Charleston, West Virginia, Charlottesville, Virginia, and Richmond, Virginia, as well as Harrisburg, Reading, and State College, Pennsylvania.

In 1990 Air Wisconsin acquired Denver-based Aspen Airways and was itself bought by United Airlines a year later.

During the 1990s, Air Wisconsin operated British Aerospace (BAe) ATP turboprop aircraft as well as BAe 146-100, BAe 146–200, and BAe 146–300 jet aircraft on United Express services. These were all large aircraft types when compared to other regional aircraft in operation at the time. Air Wisconsin was the only U.S. operator of the BAe ATP turboprop and also the BAe 146–300, which is the largest member of the BAe 146 family of jet aircraft. United Airlines sold Air Wisconsin and the BAe 146 fleet to CJT Holdings in 1993. Air Wisconsin was then renamed Air Wisconsin Airlines Corporation (AWAC) as UAL retained the rights to the Air Wisconsin name and logo. During the ski seasons, Air Wisconsin was operating BAe 146 jet shuttle service as United Express on the former Aspen Airways route between Aspen, Colorado, and Denver with at least fourteen daily nonstop flights in each direction.

In February 1998 AWAC acquired the assets of Mountain Air Express including Dornier 328 turboprop aircraft which were used to expand United Express service in the west. In the fall of 2003 AWAC acquired ten Bombardier CRJ jet aircraft from bankrupt Midway Airlines and became a feeder for AirTran Airways under the name AirTran JetConnect, but this relationship was discontinued in July 2004. Towards the end of the contract with United Airlines Air Wisconsin was unable to secure a long-term deal or extension to continue providing regional service for UAL. United failed to renew its contract with AWAC, allowing it to expire in April 2005, and the last flight under the United flag operated on April 16, 2006, using the BAe 146.

During 2005 AWAC invested $175 million U.S. into US Airways for their bankruptcy exit financing in exchange for a long-term contract operating as US Airways Express. In 2005 AWAC began operating all of its CRJ200 regional jets as a US Airways Express carrier with flight crew bases located in Philadelphia, New York LaGuardia, Washington Reagan National, and Norfolk, Virginia. US Airways merged with American Airlines in 2015 and Air Wisconsin operated as an American Eagle regional air carrier via a code sharing agreement with American until March 2018.

On November 20, 2014, it was reported that Air Wisconsin was nearing an agreement with Delta Air Lines to fly as a Delta Connection carrier beginning in January 2015. Under the terms of the deal, 26 CRJ200 aircraft were to be transferred to Air Wisconsin from Endeavor Air. In January 2015, Air Wisconsin said that negotiations had ended and that it did not want to fly under the Delta Connection brand.

In 2016, it was announced that Air Wisconsin would close all of its ground handling operations in all cities served by the air carrier primarily due to the formation of a wholly owned subsidiary of United called United Ground Express. This would leave only three American Eagle ground handling cities served, which the airline deemed uneconomical.

On March 1, 2017, Air Wisconsin announced a new agreement with United Airlines to once again operate under the United Express banner upon the expiration of the airline's agreement with American Eagle in 2018. Additionally, the new agreement with United would provide for the creation of a career pathway program whereby Air Wisconsin pilots would be offered the opportunity to move up to United upon meeting its hiring standards.

In September 2021, the company announced that they had signed a lease for at least 1 Bombardier CRJ200SF (converted cargo aircraft) set to enter service from December 2021. The aircraft was never delivered and the cargo program has most likely been canceled.

On August 22, 2022, Air Wisconsin announced a five-year contract to operate up to 60 CRJ200s for American Eagle, starting in March 2023. These aircraft are based at Chicago-O'Hare, to fill in for the Envoy Air ERJ 145s that will be transferred over to Piedmont Airlines. The airline also plans to utilize some CRJ700s. This ended their partnership with United Airlines.

On January 10, 2025, Air Wisconsin announced it is terminating its CRJ-200 operations for American Airlines to pursue independent operations providing charter and Essential Air Service subsidized flights. It is anticipated that American and Air Wisconsin will continue an interline and codeshare relationship.

On January 31, 2025, Air Wisconsin released a statement that due to their business shift in operations, they would lay off more than 500 workers across Wisconsin. The majority of those workers listed were based in Milwaukee or Appleton, Wisconsin. Additional notices on February 3, 2025 stated that more than 200 employees will also be laid off at both Dayton International Airport and at Chicago O'Hare.

In September 2025, Air Wisconsin gave notice that it will lay off the final 252 employees as sale of the company looms. The notice was filed so potential new owner Premier Shuttle is able to align the workforce with its business plan, as the WARN number may differ from final layoffs in practice. Though it was announced later that the deal did not go through.

In January 2026, Air Wisconsin was acquired by CSI Aviation. Following the acquisition, CSI Aviation has begun operating government-contracted flights with Air Wisconsin. CSI Aviation has spoken of plans to continue the airline's charter flight operations. Additionally, after a period over ten months without wage increases, flight attendants received a raise as well as other employees. The company is also actively recruiting for multiple positions.

== ICE Air ==
On January 9, 2026, Harbor Diversified sold Air Wisconsin's assets in two transactions: CSI Aviation, the broker through which U.S. Immigration and Customs Enforcement (ICE) charters its flights, acquired the airline's operations and 13 CRJ-200 aircraft, and Associated Lease and Finance Group bought another 12 CRJ-200s.

On January 15, 2026, Air Wisconsin began flying domestic transfer ("shuffle") flights for ICE, moving detainees between detention centers and deportation staging facilities; it made about 60 such flights in the rest of January. Its routes centered on Alexandria, Louisiana, and El Paso, Texas, where Air Wisconsin flights departed or arrived at least 32 times in January and early February. In April 2026, after the United States Coast Guard, Bighorn Airways and CSI Aviation's own smaller aircraft stopped flying these routes, Air Wisconsin doubled its ICE flights from March and operated 36% of all domestic transfer flights that month. Its monthly ICE flights rose from 58 in January to 503 in May and reached 679 in September 2026, when Air Wisconsin flew 53% of ICE's domestic transfer flights with the largest fleet in the ICE Air network.

In February 2026, McFleshman's Brewing Co. of Appleton, which had brewed a lager bearing the airline's name under a sponsorship agreement, cut ties with Air Wisconsin after learning that CSI Aviation planned to operate ICE flights with its aircraft.

== Destinations ==
Air Wisconsin operated as American Eagle and served 53 destinations with nearly 350 flights per day, transporting nearly six million passengers on an annual basis.

== Crew domiciles ==
Formerly operating as American Eagle, Air Wisconsin pilots and flight attendants had crew domiciles at the following locations:

- Chicago, Illinois – O'Hare International Airport (ORD)
- Dayton, Ohio – Dayton International Airport (DAY)
- Milwaukee, Wisconsin – Milwaukee Mitchell International Airport (MKE)

== Fleet ==
=== Current fleet ===
Air Wisconsin operates only the Bombardier CRJ200. Following the January 2026 sale, Human Rights First reported its CRJ200s as the largest fleet in the ICE Air network. The aircraft below are listed as ICE Air charter aircraft in the EnforcementAircraft dataset; owners and registration dates are from the Federal Aviation Administration (FAA) registry.

CRJ200s listed as flying ICE Air charters (November 2026)
Registration	Mode S code (hex)	FAA registered owner	Registered
N411ZW	A4DA2B	UMB Bank NA, trustee	May 6, 2026
N413AW	A4DF5A	Air Wisconsin Airlines LLC	June 30, 2020
N415AW	A4E6C8	CSI Aviation Inc.	May 2, 2026
N416AW	A4EA7F	CSI Aviation LLC	May 7, 2026
N420AW	A4FBB4	CSI Aviation Inc.	May 2, 2026
N425AW	A50E47	CSI Aviation Inc.	May 2, 2026
N433AW	A52E58	Air Wisconsin Airlines LLC	July 15, 2019
N435AW	A535C6	CSI Aviation Inc.	May 2, 2026
N438AW	A540EB	CSI Aviation Inc.	May 2, 2026
N442AW	A55220	Air Wisconsin Airlines LLC	April 3, 2003
N444ZW	A55BCD	UMB Bank NA, trustee	May 6, 2026
N454AW	A5810D	Air Wisconsin Airlines LLC	February 13, 2017
N458AW	A58FE9	UMB Bank NA, trustee	May 6, 2026
N468AW	A5B768	Air Wisconsin Airlines LLC	March 24, 2004
N469AW	A5BB1F	UMB Bank NA, trustee	May 6, 2026

The FAA registry lists seven further CRJ200s registered to CSI Aviation that are not listed in the dataset. With the six above, CSI Aviation holds the 13 aircraft it bought in January 2026.

CRJ200s registered to CSI Aviation, not listed as flying ICE Air charters (November 2026)
Registration	Mode S code (hex)	FAA registered owner	Registered
N409AW	A4CE25	CSI Aviation Inc.	May 2, 2026
N439AW	A544A2	CSI Aviation Inc.	May 2, 2026
N455AW	A584C4	CSI Aviation Inc.	March 1, 2026
N460AW	A599B0	CSI Aviation Inc.	March 1, 2026
N464AW	A5A88C	CSI Aviation Inc.	May 2, 2026
N470ZW	A5C36E	CSI Aviation Inc.	March 1, 2026
N471ZW	A5C725	CSI Aviation Inc.	March 1, 2026

=== Other aircraft ===
In January 2026, Associated Lease and Finance Group bought 12 CRJ200s that were not part of CSI Aviation's purchase. Of the airline's other former aircraft, the FAA registry lists, as of November 2026:

- eight registered to UMB Bank NA, trustee, between March and May 2026: N417AW, N428AW, N437AW, N441ZW, N457AW, N459AW, N463AW and N465AW;
- 27 still registered to Air Wisconsin Airlines LLC, none with a registry action since 2023: N405AW, N408AW, N410AW, N412AW, N414ZW, N419AW, N421ZW, N423AW, N424AW, N427ZW, N430AW, N431AW, N432AW, N434AW, N436AW, N440AW, N443AW, N445AW–N451AW, N453AW, N462AW and N466AW;
- five sold to other owners: N426AW, N429AW and N452AW to Spire Aviation II LLC (December 2025), N456ZW to RI Voyager LLC (February 2026) and N467AW to M&D Aviation LLC (February 2026).

N418AW was removed from the US register on July 18, 2023, on export to Bolivia.

In 2016, the airline retired four CRJ200 regional jets that had met their structural time limit and sent them to Tupelo Regional Airport (TUP) in Tupelo, Mississippi.

=== Historical fleet ===
In 2016, the airline retired four CRJ200 regional jets that had met their structural time limit and sent them to Tupelo Regional Airport (TUP) in Tupelo, Mississippi.

The following aircraft types were formerly operated by Air Wisconsin:

==== Jet aircraft ====
- BAe 146-100 (via acquisition of Aspen Airways)
- BAe 146–200
- BAe 146–300 (only U.S. operator of the BAe 146–300)
- BAC One-Eleven

==== Turboprop aircraft ====
- Beechcraft Model 99
- British Aerospace ATP
- de Havilland Canada DHC-6
- de Havilland Canada Dash 7
- de Havilland Canada Dash 8–100
- de Havilland Canada Dash 8–300
- Dornier 328 (via acquisition of Mountain Air Express)
- Fairchild Metroliner
- Fokker F27
- Short 360 (via merger with Mississippi Valley Airlines)
- Short 330 (via merger with Mississippi Valley Airlines)

==== Piston aircraft ====
- de Havilland Dove

=== Aircraft maintenance ===
Air Wisconsin performs CRJ maintenance activities at the following locations:

- Appleton, Wisconsin (Appleton International Airport)
- Milwaukee, Wisconsin (Milwaukee Mitchell International Airport)
- Dayton, Ohio (Dayton International Airport)

Air Wisconsin also contracts aircraft maintenance-heavy checks at a facility in Oklahoma City, Oklahoma (OKC).

Past heavy check maintenance was conducted in Montreal, Canada, and Hot Springs, Arkansas (HOT).

Air Wisconsin's primary aircraft painting is located in Fort Worth, Texas – Meacham International (FTW).

== Incidents and accidents ==
Air Wisconsin incidents and accidents
Flight	Date	Aircraft	Routing	Location	Description	Injuries	Cause
Flight 671	June 29, 1972	de Havilland Canada DHC-6 Twin Otter	Chicago, IL- Sheboygan, WI- Appleton, WI	near Appleton, WI	While approaching Outagamie County Regional Airport (Now Appleton International Airport), Flight 671 was involved in a midair collision over Lake Winnebago with a Convair 580 turboprop flown by North Central Airlines as Flight 290 which was operating a Green Bay-Oshkosh-Milwaukee-Chicago flight; both aircraft crashed into the lake and sank.	13 fatal (8 on Flight 671) (5 on Flight 290)	Pilots of both flights failed to see and avoid the others' aircraft
Flight 965	June 12, 1980	Swearingen Metro	Appleton, WI- Minneapolis, MN- Lincoln, NE	near Valley, NE	The aircraft suffered a failure of both turboprop engines after entering a thunderstorm. The amount of water ingested into the engine caused a power interruption and a loss of control; plane hit the ground nose-down and right wing-down; plane skidded and ended inverted	13 fatal, 2 serious	Improper in-flight decisions by captain, complete failure of 2 engines
Flight 3758	December 16, 2007	Bombardier CRJ-200	Philadelphia, PA- Providence, RI	T. F. Green Airport	Miscommunication between the first officer and captain resulted in the first officer idling the engines on final approach. Soon a 2000 ft rate of descent developed, the captain attempted to salvage the landing and stalled the aircraft. The aircraft touched down at a 9 degree bank, collapsed the landing gear and the aircraft skidded to a halt left of the runway.	0 injuries	The captain's attempt to salvage the landing from an instrument approach which exceeded stabilized approach criteria, resulting in a high sink rate, likely stall, and hard landing which exceeded the structural limitations of the airplane

== See also ==
- Air transportation in the United States
- List of airports in Wisconsin
