= Robert Fornaro =

American airline executive

Robert L. Fornaro
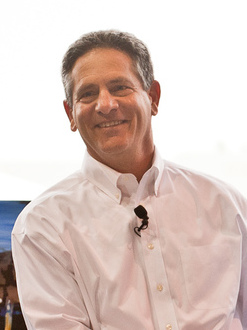
- Fornaro in 2018
- Born: 1953 (age 72–73); Long Island, New York
- Education: Rutgers College (BA)
- Occupation: Former CEO of Spirit Airlines
- Spouse: Karen Fornaro

Robert L. Fornaro (born 1952 or 1953) is an American airline executive. He most recently was the CEO of Spirit Airlines. He also was the chairman, president and chief executive officer of AirTran Holdings Inc. and its subsidiary, AirTran Airways, in Orlando, Florida, until AirTran was acquired by Southwest Airlines in May 2011, when he became a full-time consultant on the acquisition, sitting on the integration board.

== Career ==
After he left Harvard University, Fornaro worked for Trans World Airlines in scheduling and planning. He was senior vice president for marketing and planning at Braniff, Inc, vice president for research at Jesup & Lamont Securities, Inc. and director of future schedule planning for Trans World Airlines. He was then senior vice president for marketing planning at Northwest Airlines from 1988 to 1992, where he managed international alliances and regional airline partner relationships.

From 1992 to 1997, Fornaro was senior vice president for planning at US Airways where he directed the company's route planning, pricing and revenue management and overall corporate strategy. Before joining AirTran Airways, he operated an aviation consulting practice.

Fornaro joined AirTran Airways in March 1999 as president and chief financial officer. He was named chief operating officer and elected to the board of directors in March 2001. He became chief executive officer on November 1, 2007, taking over from Joe Leonard.

When AirTran was acquired by Southwest Airlines in 2011, Fornaro received a payment of $2.9 million. Fornaro acted as a consultant for the integration of the airlines.

In May 2014, Fornaro was elected to the board of directors of Spirit Airlines.

On January 5, 2016, Fornaro was appointed CEO of Spirit Airlines, replacing Ben Baldanza. In December 2017, it was announced that he would step down as CEO in January 2019 and be replaced by CFO Ted Christie.

== Education and personal life ==
Fonaro is originally from Long Island, New York. He attended Rutgers College in New Brunswick, New Jersey, on a lacrosse scholarship and earned a bachelor's degree in economics. He was a lacrosse midfielder. He also received a master's degree in city and regional planning from Harvard. He is a director of the Metro Atlanta Chamber of Commerce and is on the board of the Georgia Aquarium. He and his wife, Karen, whom he married in the 1970s, reside in Orlando and have three adult children, two daughters and a son.
