= AirTran Holdings =

- Company type: Division (NYSE: LUV)
- Traded as: NYSE: AAI
- Industry: Airlines
- Founded: November 17, 1997
- Defunct: May 2, 2011 (acquired by Southwest Airlines)
- Headquarters: Orlando, Florida, USA
- Key people: Robert L. Fornaro (CEO), (Chairman) & (President)
- Services: Air Transportation
- Revenue: ▲US$2.619 Billion (FY 2011)
- Operating income: ▼US$128.2 Million (FY 2011)
- Net income: ▼US$38.54 Million (FY 2011)
- Total assets: ▼US$2.179 Billion (FY 2011)
- Total equity: ▲US$539.3 Million (FY 2011)
- Number of employees: 8,330 (Dec 2010)
- Subsidiaries: List of former subsidiaries
- Website: AirTran.com

AirTran Holdings (NYSE: AAI) was a Nevada corporation, based in Orlando, Florida, United States, that operated as an airline holding company. Its primary asset was AirTran Airways until Southwest Airlines acquired AirTran on May 2, 2011.

== History ==
After the large amount of negative publicity surrounding the Flight 592 disaster, ValuJet Airlines suffered serious financial problems. On July 10, 1997, ValuJet announced it would merge with the much smaller Airways Corporation, the owner of Orlando, Florida based AirTran Airways. In November 1997, AirTran Holdings announced it would move its headquarters to Airways' existing headquarters in Orlando from Atlanta; on November 17, 1997, Airways Corporation and ValuJet completed their merger and the name ValuJet was dropped.

On January 11, 1999, Joseph Leonard was elected as the chairman, president and chief executive officer of the company.

On August 15, 2001, AirTran stock began trading on the New York Stock Exchange.

=== Proposed AirTran Holding acquisition of Midwest Air Group ===
In December 2006, AirTran Holdings made public that in December 2005 it had approached the board of directors of Midwest Air Group—owner of Midwest Airlines and Skyway Airlines which operates as Midwest Connect—and had asked the board negotiate a sale of the company. That AirTran offer in 2005 was rebuffed by Midwest's board, which also rebuffed a second offer in late 2006. In December 2006, AirTran disclosed the rejection of both offers in hopes of bringing shareholder pressure on Midwest's board to reconsider, which the board recommended that shareholders reject.

On December 13, 2006, AirTran announced that it had made an offer to acquire Midwest Airlines, another operator of the Boeing 717. The offer has since been rejected by the Midwest board. On January 11, 2007, AirTran sweetened its offer for Midwest to $13.25 a share from $11.25 a share, valued at US$290 million, or a 24% premium over Midwest's trading price at the time, and AirTran took its renewed bid directly to Midwest shareholders, bypassing Midwest's board of directors; with an offer that expires on April 11, 2007. On April 2, 2007 AirTran raised its bid to $15 a share, in what CEO Joe Leonard called AirTran's final bid.

In response to AirTran's overtures, Midwest Air Group has stated publicly that it believes that it can maximize shareholder value as a stand-alone company. Midwest Air Group has said that the latest AirTran proposal rejected by its board of directors significantly undervalued Midwest and did not reflect the long-term opportunity inherent in its strategic growth plan. The company also has reiterated that its strategic business plan will offer superior value to shareholders by capitalizing on current industry conditions while remaining true to Midwest's commitment to customer service excellence.

On January 11, 2007, AirTran Holdings increased its bid for Midwest to $345 million in cash and stock, an 18% increase from their previous offer.

On April 2, 2007, AirTran again raised its bid for Midwest to $389 million in cash and stock ($9 in cash and .5842 shares of AirTran stock totaling $15 a share). CEO Joe Leonard stated that this would be AirTran's final bid.

In May 2007, an independent securities expert William McGinnis, CFA, published an analysis of board of directors responsibilities related to hostile takeover offers. He utilized the AirTran offers for Midwest Airlines as the basis for this case study which is available here.

AirTran was successful in having its slate of 3 board members elected to the Midwest Air Group's board of directors in the election on June 14, 2007 at the Midwest annual meeting.

On August 12, 2007, it was announced that AirTran had lost the bid for Midwest. A private equity group, headed by TPG Capital and including Northwest Airlines, had purchased Midwest and will turn the airline into a privately funded company.

On August 14, 2007, it was announced that AirTran had renewed their bid for Midwest at a price slightly above that of the TPG Capital offer, in theory at the request of Midwest shareholders. Pequot Capital Management, which owns 8.8% of Midwest, had been unhappy with the TPG Capital offer, as they felt that AirTran's cash and stock offer would result in greater gains because they felt AirTran's stock would rise in value once the acquisition of Midwest was completed. An executive at another unnamed investment group also expressed similar misgivings about the TPG Capital offer. TPG Capital's offer had been $16/share in cash, where AirTran's latest offer is $10 cash plus 0.6056 share of AirTran stock for each share of Midwest, which at the close of trading on August 13 made the value of AirTran's new offer approximately $16.25/share in cash and stock.

However, Midwest announced TPG would increase its offer to $17 per share and a definitive agreement had been reached on August 16, 2007.

=== Acquisition by Southwest Airlines ===
On September 27, 2010, Southwest Airlines announced it would acquire AirTran Holdings, along with its subsidiary AirTran Airways. The companies operated separately for a period of time until the absorption of the owned and leased aircraft within AirTran's fleet was completed. On May 2, 2011, AirTran Holdings was purchased by Southwest Airlines. As a result, AirTran Airways and AirTran Holdings both became fully owned subsidiaries of Southwest Airlines.

== Former subsidiaries ==
- AirTran Airways
- Galena Corp - The servicing/support company of the Airline that was created on March 24, 1999.
