= Boeing 717 =

Small single-aisle airliner

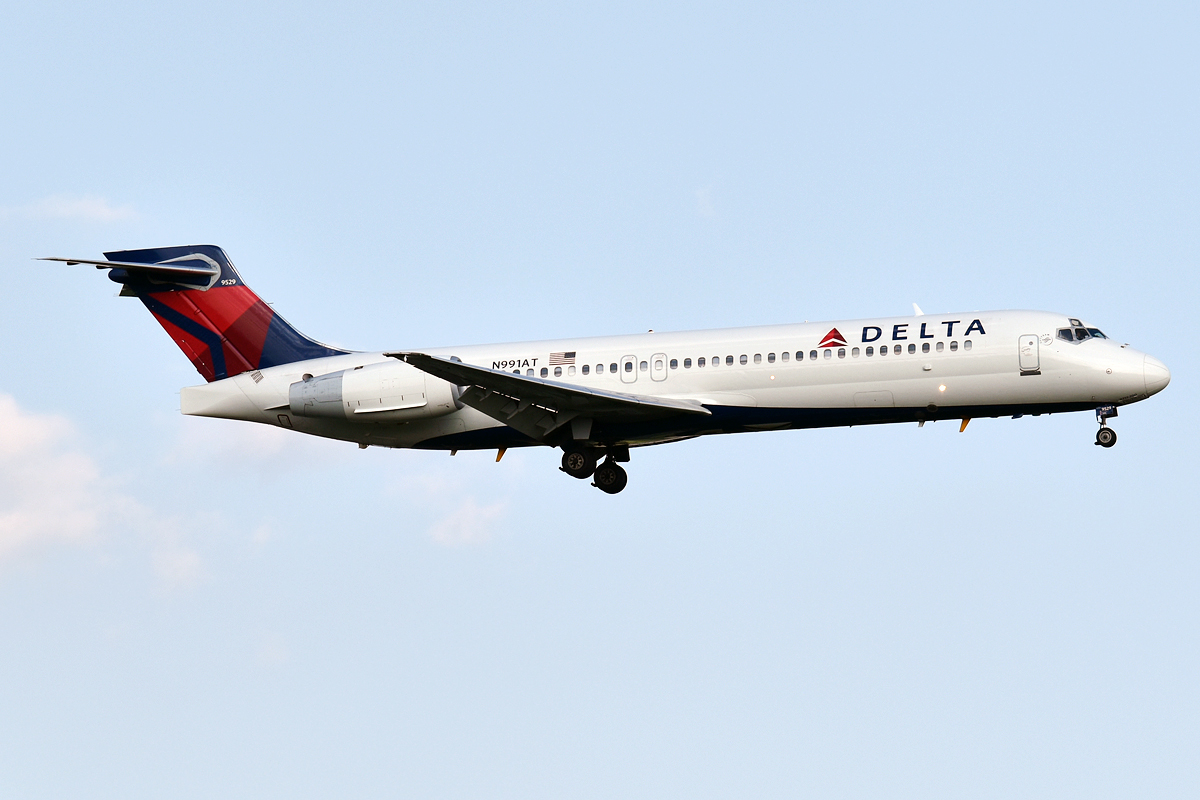
- A Boeing 717 of Delta Air Lines, its largest operator

General information
- Type: Narrow-body jet airliner
- National origin: United States
- Manufacturer: Boeing Commercial Airplanes
- Designer: McDonnell Douglas
- Status: In service
- Primary users: Delta Air Lines Hawaiian Airlines; QantasLink (historical); AirTran Airways (historical)
- Number built: 156

History
- Manufactured: 1998–2006
- Introduction date: October 12, 1999, with AirTran Airways
- First flight: September 2, 1998
- Developed from: McDonnell Douglas DC-9

The Boeing 717 is an American, five-abreast, narrow-body airliner produced by Boeing Commercial Airplanes. The twin-engined airliner was developed for the 100-seat market and originally marketed by McDonnell Douglas in the early 1990s as the McDonnell Douglas MD-95 until the company merged with Boeing in August 1997. It was a shortened derivative of McDonnell Douglas’ successful airliner, the MD-80, and part of the company's broader DC-9 family. Capable of seating up to 134 passengers, the 717 has a design range of 2,060 nautical miles (3,820 km; 2,370 mi). It is powered by two Rolls-Royce BR715 turbofan engines mounted at the rear of the fuselage.

The first order for the airliner was placed with McDonnell Douglas in October 1995 by ValuJet Airlines (later AirTran Airways). With the 1997 merger taking place prior to production, the airliner entered service in 1999 as the Boeing 717. Production of the type ceased in May 2006 after 155 were delivered, with 99 examples remaining in service as of November 2024. The type has not been involved in a hull loss or fatal incident.

== Development ==
=== Background ===
Douglas Aircraft launched the DC-9, a short-range companion to its larger, four-engined DC-8, in 1963. The DC-9 was an all-new design, using two rear fuselage-mounted Pratt & Whitney JT8D turbofan engines, a small, efficient wing, and a T-tail. The DC-9's maiden flight was in 1965 and entered airline service later that year. When production ended in 1982, a total of 976 DC-9s had been produced.

The McDonnell Douglas MD-80 series, the second generation of the DC-9, began airline service in 1980. It was a lengthened DC-9-50 with a higher maximum take-off weight (MTOW) and higher fuel capacity, as well as next-generation Pratt and Whitney JT8D-200 series engines and an improved wing design. In all, 1,191 MD-80s were delivered from 1980 to 1999.

The McDonnell Douglas MD-90 was developed from the MD-80 series. It was launched in 1989 and first flew in 1993. The MD-90 was longer and featured a glass cockpit (electronic instrumentation) and more powerful, quieter, fuel-efficient IAE V2525-D5 engines, with the option of upgrading to IAE V2528 engines. In total, 116 MD-90 airliners were delivered.

=== MD-95 ===
The MD-95 traces its history back to 1983 when McDonnell Douglas outlined a study named the DC-9-90. During the early 1980s, as production of the DC-9 family moved away from the smaller Series 30 towards the larger Super 80 (later redesignated MD-80) variants, McDonnell Douglas proposed a smaller version of the DC-9 to fill the gap left by the DC-9-30. Dubbed the DC-9-90, it was revealed in February 1983 and was to be some 25 ft 4 in (7.72 m) shorter than the DC-9-81, giving it an overall length of 122 ft 6 in (37.34 m). The aircraft was proposed with a 17,000 lbf (76 kN) thrust version of the JT8D-200 series engine, although the CFM International CFM56-3 was also considered. Seating up to 117 passengers, the DC-9-90 was to be equipped with the DC-9's wing with 2 ft (0.61 m) tip extensions, rather than the more heavily modified increased area of the MD-80. The aircraft had a design range of 1,430 nmi (2,648 km; 1,646 mi), with an option to increase to 2,060 nmi (3,815 km; 2,371 mi), and a gross weight of 112,000 lb (51,000 kg).

The DC-9-90 was designed to meet the needs of the newly deregulated American airline industry. However, its development was postponed by the recession of the early 1980s. When McDonnell Douglas did develop a smaller version of the MD-80, it simply shrunk the aircraft to create the MD-87, rather than offer a lower thrust, lighter aircraft that was more comparable to the DC-9-30. With its relatively high MTOW and powerful engines, the MD-87 essentially became a special mission aircraft and could not compete with the all-new 100-seaters then being developed. Although an excellent aircraft for specialized roles, the MD-87 often was not sold on its own. Relying on its commonality factor, sales were generally limited to existing MD-80 operators.

In 1991, McDonnell Douglas revealed that it was again considering developing a specialized 100-seat version of the MD-80, initially named the MD-87-105 (105 seats). It was to be some 8 ft (2.4 m) shorter than the MD-87, powered with engines in the 16,000–17,000 lbf (71–76 kN) thrust class. McDonnell Douglas, Pratt & Whitney, and the China National Aero-Technology Import Export Agency signed a memorandum of understanding to develop a 105-seat version of the MD-80. At the 1991 Paris Airshow, McDonnell Douglas announced the development of a 105-seat aircraft, designated MD-95. The new name was selected to reflect the anticipated year deliveries would begin. McDonnell Douglas first offered the MD-95 for sale in 1994.

In early 1994, the MD-95 re-emerged as similar to the DC-9-30, its specified weight, dimensions, and fuel capacity being almost identical. Major changes included a fuselage "shrink" back to 119 ft 4 in (36.37 m) length (same as the DC-9-30), and the reversion to the original DC-9 wingspan of 93 ft 5 in (28.47 m). At this time, McDonnell Douglas said that it expected the MD-95 to become a family of aircraft with the capability of increased range and seating capacity. The MD-95 was developed to satisfy the market need to replace early DC-9s, then approaching 30 years old. The MD-95 was a complete overhaul, going back to the original DC-9-30 design and applying new engines, cockpit, and other, more modern systems.

In March 1995, longtime McDonnell Douglas customer Scandinavian Airlines System chose the Boeing 737-600 for its 100-seater over the MD-95. In October 1995, U.S. new entrant and low-cost carrier ValuJet signed an order for 50 MD-95s, plus 50 options. McDonnell Douglas president Harry Stonecipher felt that launching MD-95 production on the basis of this single order held little risk, stating that further orders would "take a while longer". The ValuJet order was the only order received for some two years.

=== Engines ===
As first proposed, the MD-95 was to be powered by a 16,500 lbf (73 kN) thrust derivative of the JT8D-200 series with the Rolls-Royce Tay 670 also considered as an alternative. This was confirmed in January 1992, when Rolls-Royce and McDonnell Douglas signed a memorandum of understanding concerning the Tay-powered MD-95. McDonnell Douglas said that the MD-95 project would cost only a minimal amount to develop, as it was a direct offshoot of the IAE-powered MD-90.

During 1993, McDonnell Douglas seemed to be favoring a life-extension program of the DC-9-30, under the program name DC-9X, to continue its presence in the 100-120 seat market, rather than concentrating on the new-build MD-95. In its evaluation of the engine upgrades available for the DC-9X, McDonnell Douglas found the BMW Rolls-Royce BR700 engine to be the ideal candidate, and on February 23, 1994, the BR700 was selected as the sole powerplant for the airliner.

=== Production site ===
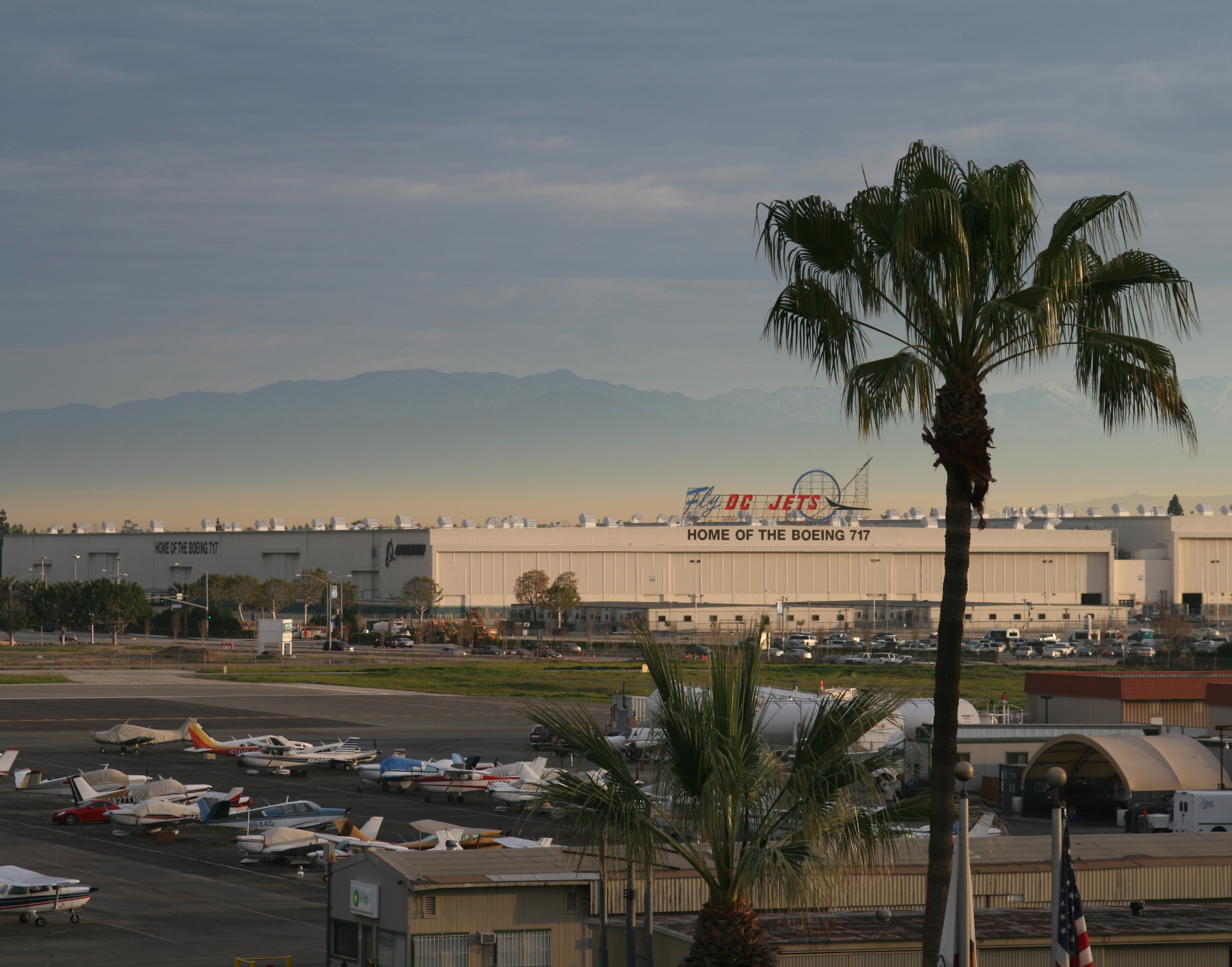
The Boeing 717 was assembled at the company's facility in Long Beach, California.

McDonnell Douglas was planning for MD-95 final assembly to be undertaken in China, as an offshoot of the Trunkliner program, for which McDonnell Douglas had been negotiating to have up to 150 MD-90s built in China. The MD-90 Trunkliner deal was finalized in June 1992, but the contract was for a total of 40 aircraft, including 20 MD-80Ts and 20 -90Ts. The MD-80 has been license built in Shanghai since the 1980s. However, in early 1993, MDC said that it was considering sites outside China, and was later seeking alternative locations for the assembly line. In 1994, McDonnell Douglas sought global partners to share development costs. It also began a search for a low-cost final-assembly site. Halla Group in South Korea was selected to make the wings; Alenia of Italy was to make the entire fuselage, Aerospace Industrial Development Corp. of Taiwan was to make the tail, ShinMaywa of Japan was to make the horizontal stabilizer, and a manufacturing division of Korean Air Lines was to make the nose and cockpit.

On November 8, 1994, McDonnell Douglas announced that final assembly would be taken away from the longtime Douglas plant at Long Beach Airport, California. Instead, it selected a modifications and maintenance operation, Dalfort Aviation in Dallas, Texas, to assemble the MD-95. In early 1995, management and unions in Long Beach reached an agreement to hold down wage costs for the life of the MD-95 program and McDonnell Douglas canceled the preliminary agreement with Dalfort.

=== Rebranding and marketing ===
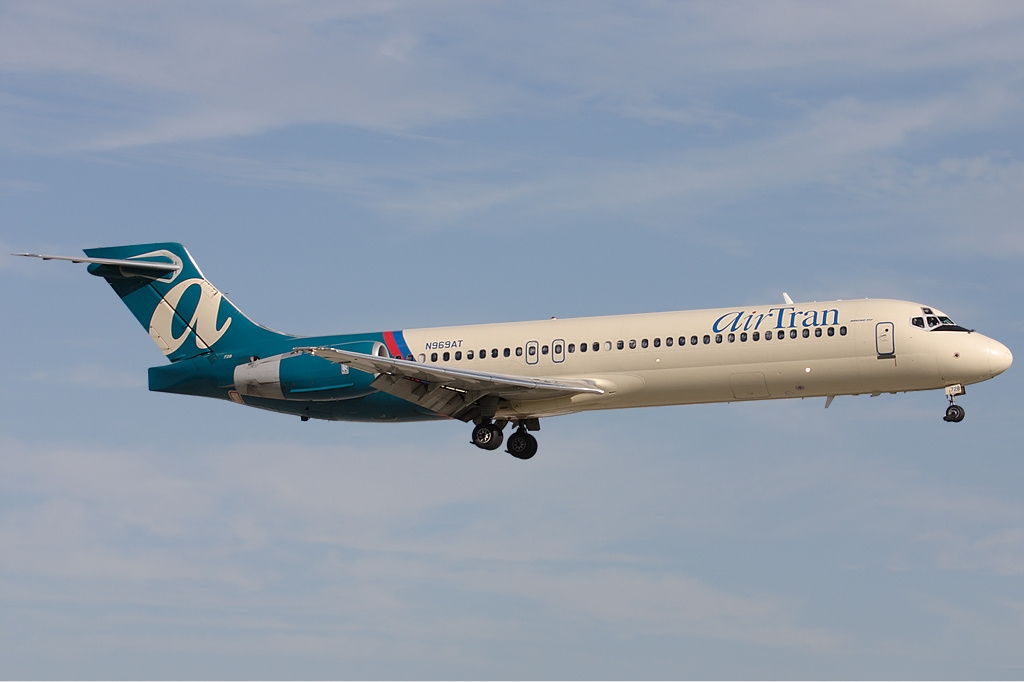
The first and last 717s were delivered to AirTran Airways, which merged with Southwest in 2014.

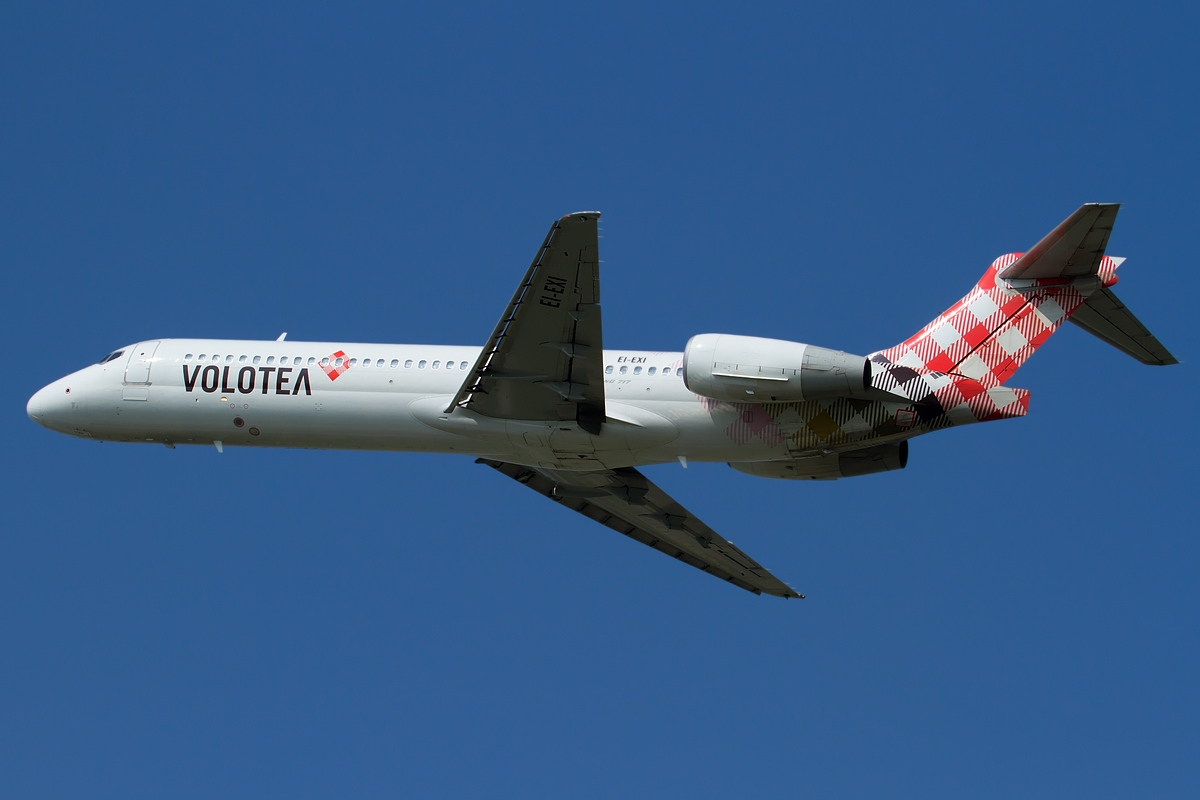
Volotea was the last European operator to retire the 717 in 2021.

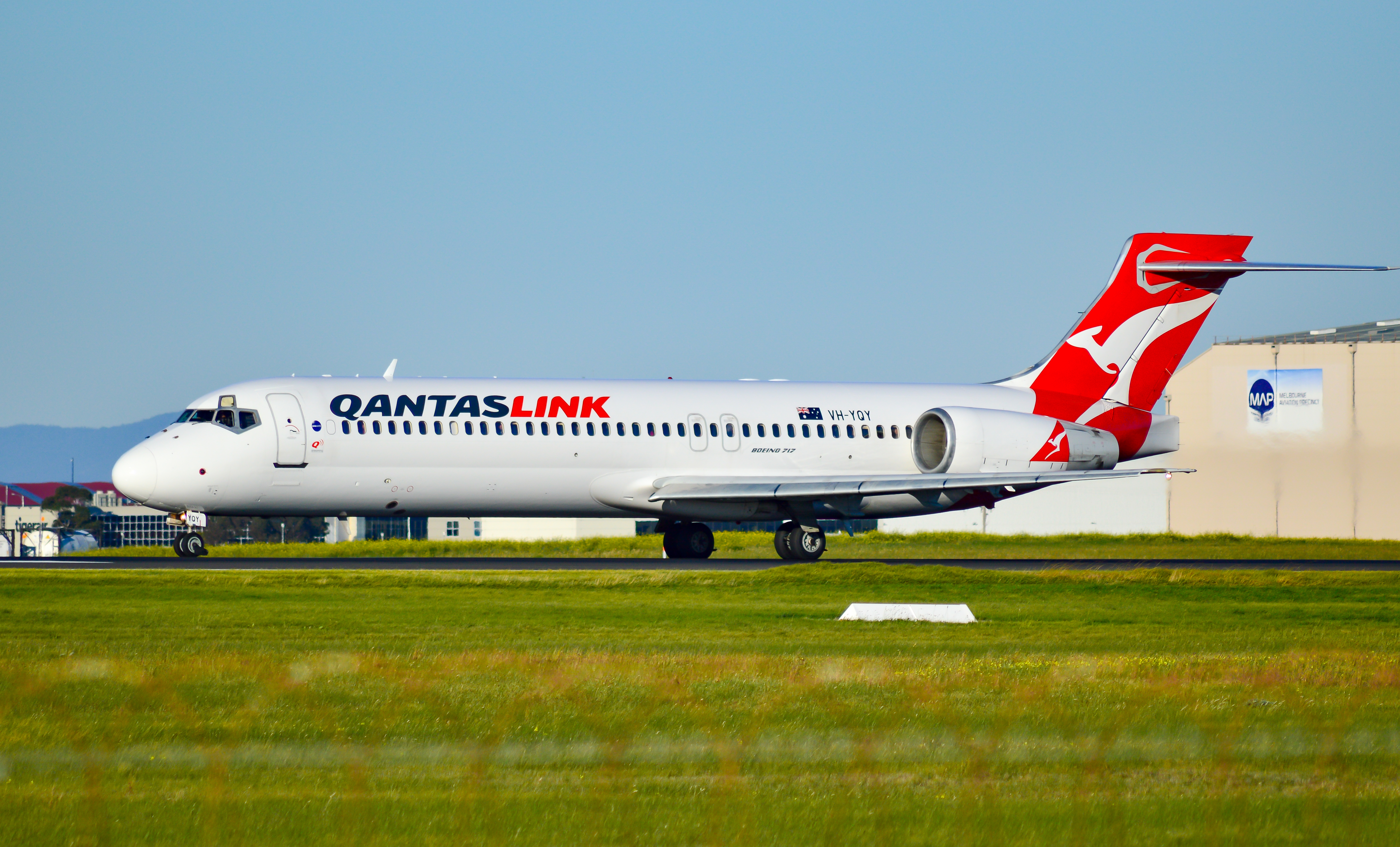
QantasLink was the last 717 operator outside of the United States with the last retired in 2024

After McDonnell Douglas was acquired by Boeing in August 1997, most industry observers expected that Boeing would cancel development of the MD-95. However, Boeing decided to go forward with the design under a new name, Boeing 717. While it appeared that Boeing had skipped the 717 model designation when the 720 and the 727 followed the 707, the 717 name was the company's model number for the C-135 Stratolifter military transport and KC-135 Stratotanker tanker aircraft; 717 had also been used to promote an early design of the 720 to airlines before it was modified to meet market demands. A Boeing historian notes that the Air Force tanker was designated "717-100" and the commercial airliner designated "717-200". The lack of a widespread use of the 717 name left it available for rebranding the MD-95.

At first, Boeing had no more success selling the 717 than McDonnell Douglas. Even the original order for 50 was no certainty in the chaotic postderegulation U.S. airline market. Assembly started on the first 717 in May 1997. The aircraft had its roll-out ceremony on June 10, 1998. The 717's first flight took place on September 2, 1998. Following flight testing, the airliner was awarded a type certification on September 1, 1999. Its first delivery was in September 1999 to AirTran Airways, which Valujet was now called. Commercial service began the following month. Trans World Airlines (TWA) ordered 50 717s in 1998 with an option for 50 additional aircraft.

Boeing's decision to go ahead with the 717 slowly began to pay off. The small Australian regional airline Impulse took a long-term lease on five 717s in early 2000 to begin an expansion into mainline routes. The ambitious move could not be sustained in competition with the majors, and Impulse sold out to Qantas in May 2001.

The new Rolls-Royce BR715 engine design is relatively easy to maintain. Many 717 operators, such as QantasLink, became converts to the plane; QantasLink bought more 717s to replace its BAe 146 fleet, and other orders came from Hawaiian Airlines and Midwest Airlines.

Boeing actively marketed the 717 to a number of large airlines, including Northwest Airlines, which already operated a large fleet of DC-9 aircraft, and Lufthansa. Boeing also studied a stretched, higher-capacity version of the 717, to have been called 717-300, but decided against proceeding with the new model, fearing that it would encroach on the company's 737-700 model. Production of the original 717 continued. Boeing continued to believe that the 100-passenger market would be lucrative enough to support both the 717 and the 737-600, the smallest of the Next-Generation 737 series. While the aircraft were similar in overall size, the 737-600 was better suited to long-distance routes, while the lighter 717 was more efficient on shorter, regional routes.

=== Assembly line and end of production ===
In 2001, Boeing began implementing a moving assembly line for production of the 717 and 737. The moving line greatly reduced production time, which led to lower production costs. Following the slump in airline traffic caused by an economic downturn subsequent to the terrorist attacks on September 11, 2001, Boeing announced a review of the type's future. After much deliberation, it decided to continue with production. Despite the lack of orders, Boeing had confidence in the 717's fundamental suitability to the 100-seat market and in the long-term size of that market. After 19 worldwide 717 sales in 2000, and just six in 2001, Boeing took 32 orders for the 717 in 2002, despite the severe industry downturn. The 100th 717 was delivered to AirTran Airways on June 18, 2002.

Increased competition from regional jets manufactured by Bombardier and Embraer took a heavy toll on sales during the airline slump after 2001. American Airlines acquired TWA and initially planned to continue the 717 order. American Airlines canceled TWA's order for Airbus A318s, but eventually also canceled the Boeing 717s that had not yet been delivered. The beginning of the end came in December 2003, when Boeing failed to reach a US$2.7 billion contract from Air Canada, a long-term DC-9 customer, which chose the Embraer E-Jets and Bombardier CRJ200 over the 717. On January 14, 2005, citing slow sales, Boeing announced that it planned to end production of the 717 after it had met all of its outstanding orders.

The 156th and final 717 rolled off the assembly line in April 2006 for AirTran Airways, which was the 717's launch customer, as well as its final customer. The final two Boeing 717s were delivered to customers Midwest Airlines and AirTran Airways on May 23, 2006. The 717 was the last commercial airplane produced at Boeing's Long Beach facility in Southern California.

=== Retirement ===
The first Boeing 717 aircraft built, registered as N717XA, was scrapped in 2005. TWA sold its aircraft to American Airlines after TWA went bankrupt in December 2001. American Airlines retired its 717s in 2003 and sold them to AirTran Airways, QantasLink, and Bangkok Airways. Impulse Airlines sold its 717s to QantasLink in 2004 after the airline ceased operations. Germanwings retired its 717s in 2005 only one year after receiving them. Jetstar retired its 717s in 2007 and sold them to QantasLink. Bangkok Airways, Midwest Airlines, and Olympic Airlines retired their 717s in 2009. Quantum Air retired its 717s after ceasing operations in January 2010. MexicanaClick went bankrupt in August 2010 and retired its 717s. Spanair retired its 717s in 2011. AirTran sold its 717s to Delta Air Lines after the company merged with Southwest in 2014 with the plane registered as N717JL making AirTran's final flight from Atlanta to Tampa in December 2014. Turkmenistan Airlines retired its last 717 in July 2018 and was the last Asian operator of the 717. Volotea retired its last 717 in January 2021 and was the last European operator of the 717. QantasLink initially retired its last 717 in October 2024 with the aircraft registered as VH-YQS making its final flight from Sydney to Canberra. However, the aircraft registered VH-YQW returned to service in November 2024 and made its final flight in December 2024 from Canberra to Brisbane as QF6216 to become a training aid at Aviation Australia, marking the end of 717 operators outside of the U.S.

The FAA issued an airworthiness directive in October 2024 after multiple cracks were discovered in the wing of a 717, including "one approximately 7 inches in length that is not capable of sustaining a limit load event". The FAA warned, "[I]f not addressed, [the cracks] could lead to reduced structural integrity of the airplane and loss of control of the airplane, which could result in a catastrophic event." The directive required inspections of all 717s, and corrective actions if issues were discovered.

As of 2025, Delta Air Lines and Hawaiian Airlines still operate their 717s, although Delta announced in 2020 that it would retire its fleet within five years. By 2026, Delta had pushed its plans to retire the 717 to 2030, though the airline had already retired six aircraft by June of that year. Hawaiian Airlines CEO Peter Ingram mentioned in 2024 that "the 717 still has enough life left" and that no firm replacement was selected yet, with complete retirement of the fleet several years away. Alaska Airlines — which had meanwhile acquired Hawaiian Airlines — announced in July 2026 that it would replace Hawaiian's aging 717 fleet with 737-800s beginning in 2028.

=== Program timeline ===
- Announced: June 16, 1991, at the Paris Air Show as MD-95 program by McDonnell Douglas
- Approval to offer: July 22, 1994, McDonnell Douglas received board approval to offer the aircraft.
- First order: October 10, 1995, from ValuJet (later to become AirTran Airways) for 50 firm and 50 options for MD-95s
- Roll out: June 10, 1998, at Long Beach, California
- First flight: September 2, 1998
- Certification: FAA: September 1, 1999; EASA (JAA): September 16, 1999
- Entry into service: October 12, 1999, with AirTran Airways on Atlanta-Washington, D.C. (Dulles) route
- Last delivery: May 23, 2006, to AirTran Airways.

== Design ==
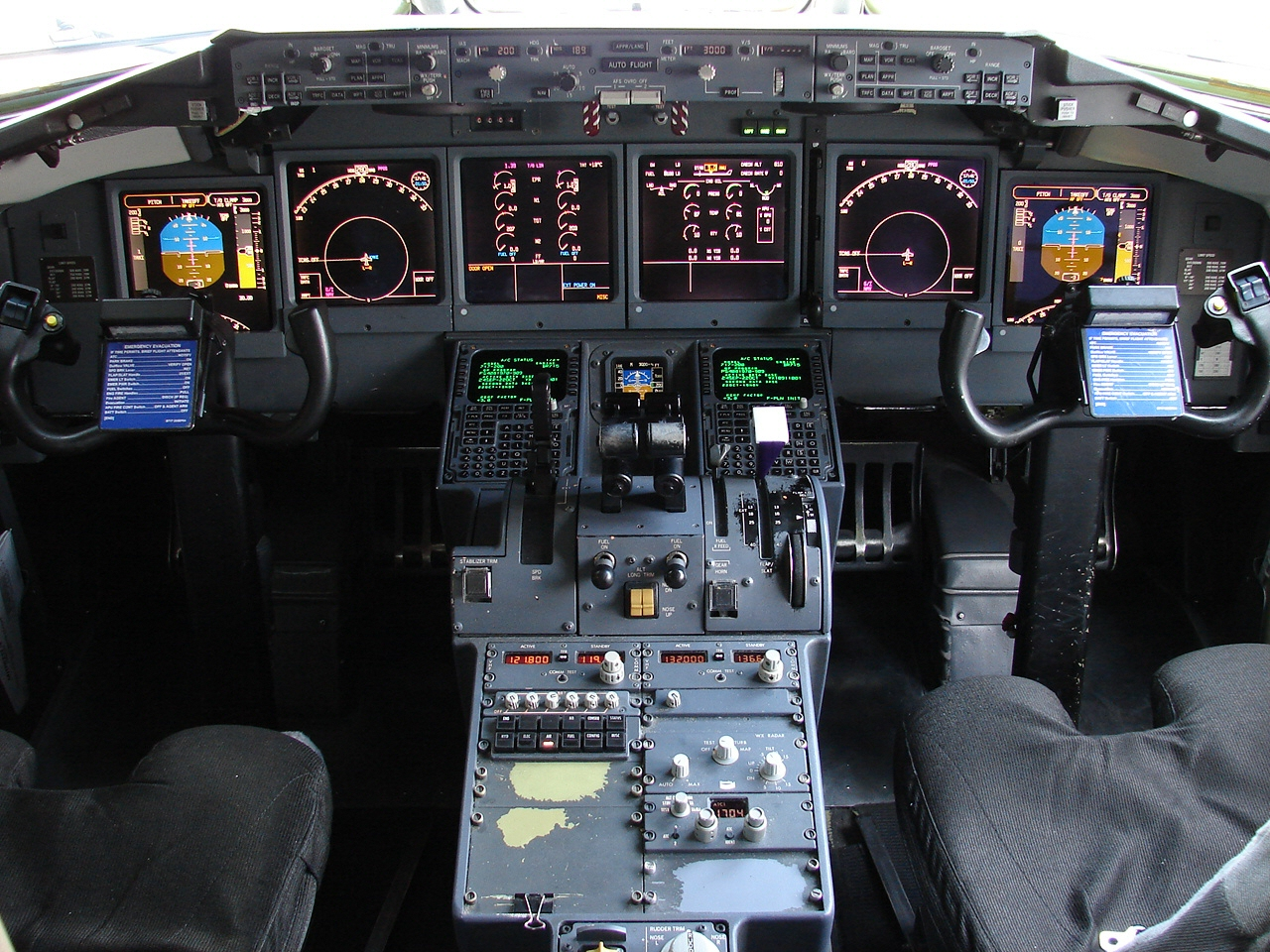
Two-crew cockpit with six displays

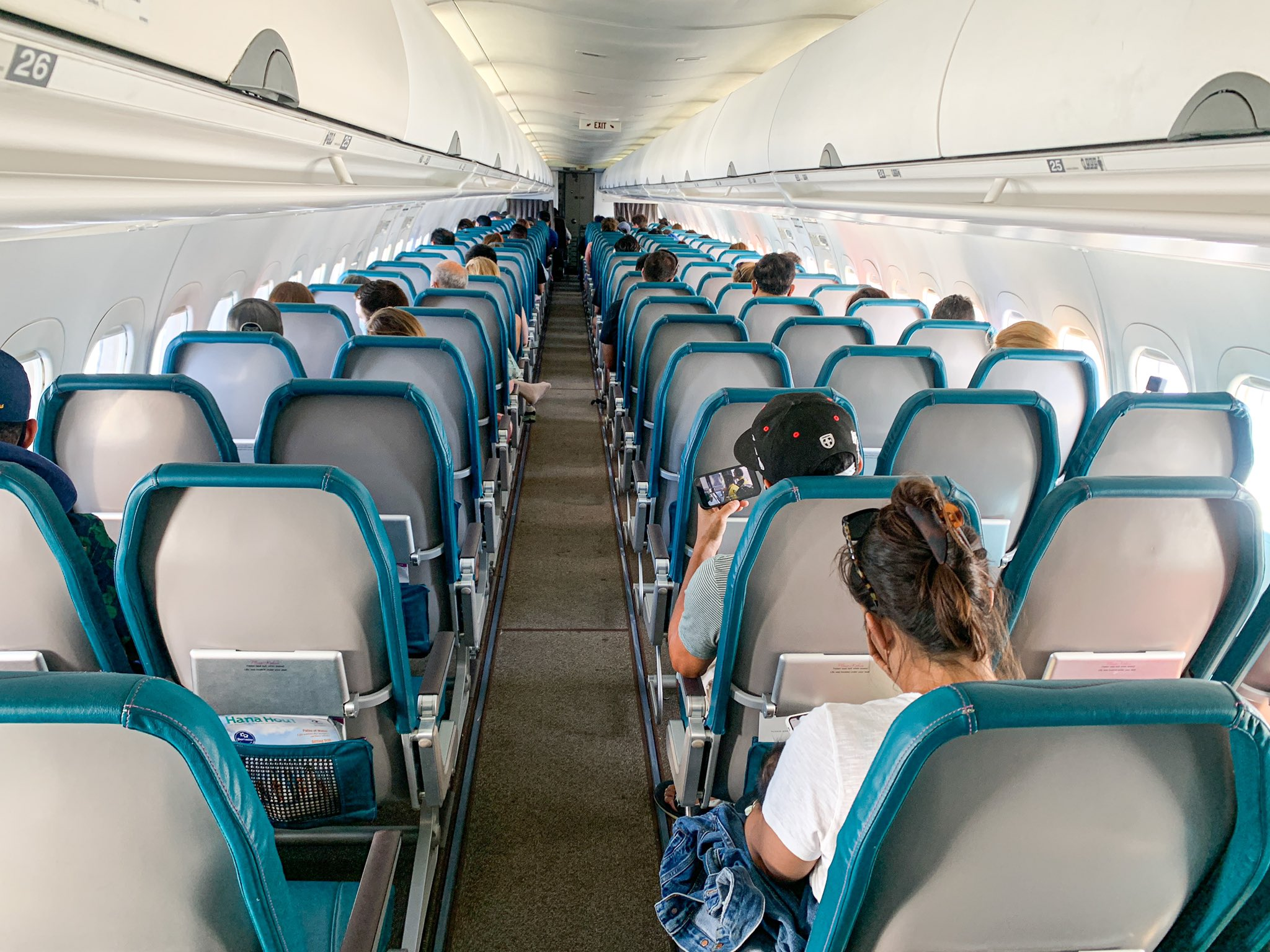
The 717 retains the five-abreast seating from the McDonnell Douglas DC-9, seen here inside a Hawaiian Airlines aircraft.

The 717 features a two-crew glass cockpit that incorporates six interchangeable liquid-crystal-display units and advanced Honeywell VIA 2000 computers. The cockpit design is called Advanced Common Flightdeck and is shared with the MD-10 and similar to the MD-11. Flight deck features include an electronic instrument system, a dual flight management system, a central fault display system, and global positioning system. Category IIIb automatic landing capability for bad-weather operations and future air navigation systems are available. The 717 shares the same type rating as the DC-9, such that the FAA approved transition courses for DC-9 and analog MD-80 pilots could be completed in 11 days.

In conjunction with Parker Hannifin, MPC Products of Skokie, Illinois, designed a fly-by-wire technology mechanical control suite for the 717 flight deck. The modules replaced much cumbersome rigging that had occurred in previous DC-9/MD-80 aircraft. The Rolls-Royce BR715 engines are completely controlled by an electronic engine system (Full Authority Digital Engine Control) developed by BAE Systems, offering improved controllability and optimization. The engine claimed significantly lower fuel consumption compared to others then available with the equivalent amount of thrust.

Like its DC-9/MD-80/MD-90 predecessors, the 717 has a 2+3 seating arrangement in the main economy class, providing only one middle seat per row, whereas other single-aisle twin jets, such as the Boeing 737 family and the Airbus A320 family, often have 3+3 arrangement with two middle seats per row. Unlike its predecessors, McDonnell Douglas decided not to offer the MD-95/717 with the boarding flexibility of aft airstairs, with the goal of maximizing fuel efficiency through the reduction and simplification of as much auxiliary equipment as possible.

== Variants ==
717-200
Production variant powered by either two Rolls-Royce BR715A1-30 or BR715C1-30 engines with 134 passenger seat, 155 built.
717 Business Express
Proposed corporate version of 717-200, unveiled at the EBACE Convention in Geneva, Switzerland in May 2003. Configurable for 40 to 80 passengers in first and/or business class interior (typically, 60 passengers with seat pitch of 52 in (130 cm). Maximum range in HGW configuration with auxiliary fuel and 60 passengers was 3,140 nmi (5,820 km; 3,610 mi). The version complements BBJ family.
717-100 (-100X)
Proposed 86-seat version, formerly MD-95-20; four frames (6 ft 3 in (1.91 m)) shorter. Renamed 717-100X; wind tunnel tests began in early 2000; revised mid-2000 to eight-frame (12 ft 8 in (3.86 m)) shrink. Launch decision was deferred in December 2000 and again thereafter to an undisclosed date. Shelved by mid-2003.
717-100X Lite
Proposed 75-seat version, powered by Rolls-Royce Deutschland BR710 turbofans; later abandoned.
717-300X
Proposed stretched version, formerly MD-95-50; studies suggest typical two-class seating for 130 passengers, with overall length increased to 138 ft 4 in (42.16 m) by addition of nine frames (five forward and four aft of wing); higher MTOW and space-limited payloads weights; additional service door aft of wing; and 21,000 lbf (93 kN) BR715C1-30 engines. AirTran expressed interest in converting some -200 options to this model. Was under consideration late 2003 by Star Alliance Group (Air Canada, Austrian Airlines, Lufthansa and SAS); interest was reported from Delta, Iberia and Northwest Airlines.

== Operators ==
As of November 2024, 99 Boeing 717s are in service with Delta Air Lines (80) and Hawaiian Airlines (19) down from 148 aircraft in 2018.

Delta Air Lines is the largest operator of the 717, flying over 70% of all in-service jets as of 2024. In 2013, Delta began leasing the entire fleet of 88 jets previously operated by AirTran Airways from Southwest Airlines, which had purchased AirTran, but wanted to preserve its all-Boeing 737 fleet rather than taking on another class of aircraft. For Delta, used Boeing 717s and MD-90s allowed them to retire their DC-9s, while also being cheaper to acquire than buying brand-new jets from Airbus or Boeing. Unlike other mainline U.S. legacy carriers, Delta has decided that its best path to profitability is a strategy that uses older aircraft, and Delta has created a very extensive maintenance, repair, and overhaul organization, called TechOps, to support them.

In 2015, Blue1 announced it would sell its 717 fleet, with five jets going to Delta and four going to the then-third-largest operator of the type, Volotea, a Spanish low-cost carrier. In January 2021, Volotea then retired the last of its 19 Boeing 717s. It was the last remaining European operator of the type.

=== Orders and deliveries ===
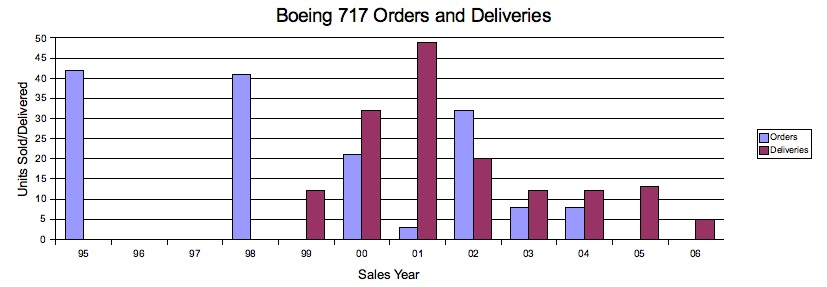

Orders and deliveries
	Total	2006	2005	2004	2003	2002	2001	2000	1999	1998	1997	1996	1995
Orders	155	–	–	8	8	32	3	21	–	41	–	–	42
Deliveries	155	5	13	12	12	20	49	32	12	–	–	–	–

== Accidents and incidents ==
As of March 2025, the Boeing 717 has been involved in six aviation accidents and incidents, but with no hull-losses and no fatalities. The major incidents included one on-ground collision while taxiing, an emergency landing where the nose landing gear did not extend, and one attempted hijacking.

== Specifications (Boeing 717-200, basic model) ==
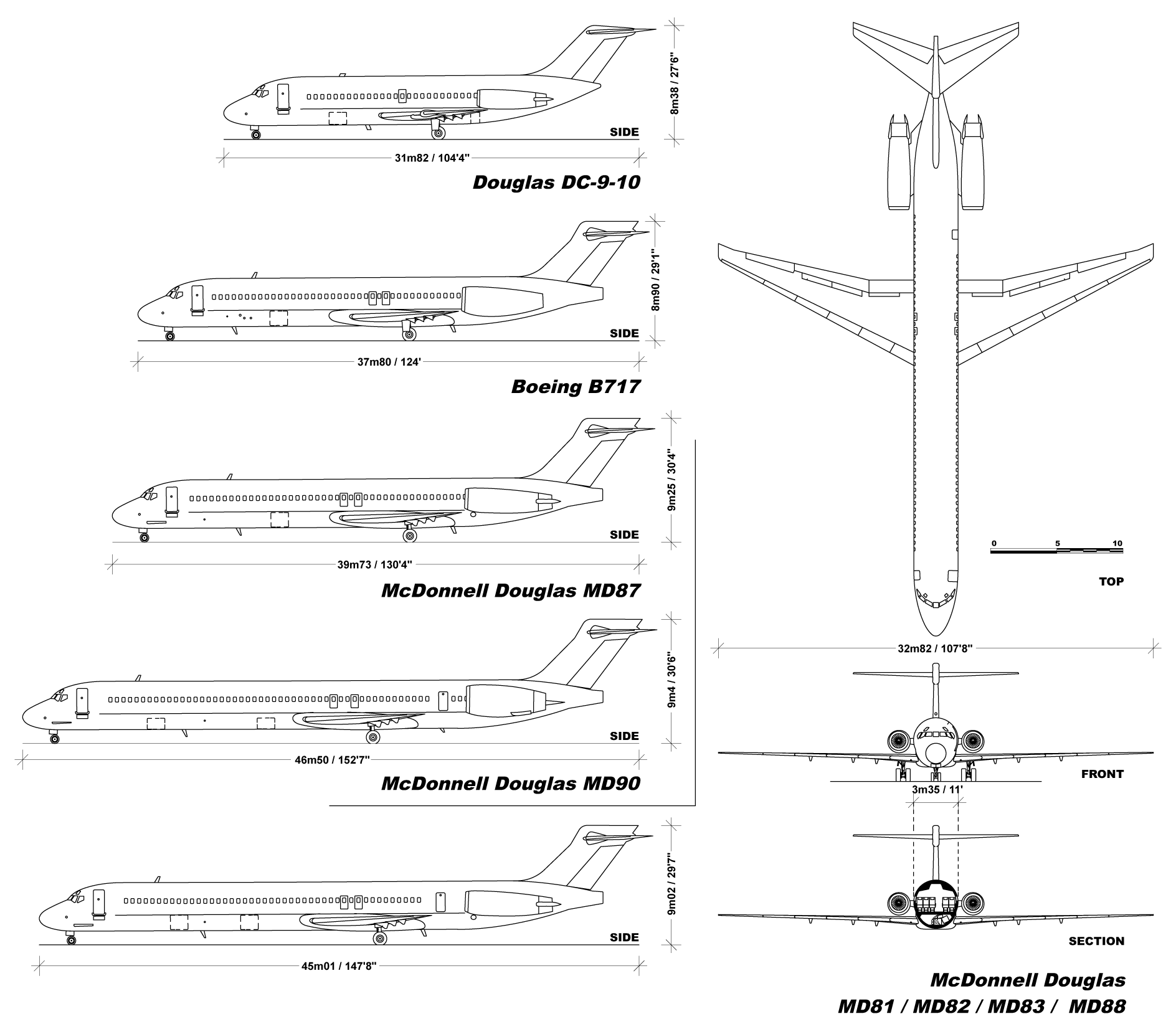
Comparison of Douglas DC-9, Boeing 717, McDonnell Douglas MD-90 and McDonnell Douglas MD-80 series aircraft

Data from

General characteristics

- Crew: 2
- Capacity: 106 passengers in two classes or 117 in one class, and 935 cu ft (26.5 m^{3}) of cargo
- Length: 124 ft 0 in (37.80 m)
- Wingspan: 93 ft 4 in (28.45 m)
- Height: 29 ft 8 in (9.04 m)
- Empty weight: 67,500 lb (30,617 kg)
- Max takeoff weight: 110,000 lb (49,895 kg)
- Fuel capacity: 3,673 US gal (3,058 imp gal; 13,900 L)
- Powerplant: 2 × Rolls-Royce BR715-A1-30 turbofan engine, 18,920 lbf (84.2 kN) thrust each

Performance

- Maximum speed: 566 mph (911 km/h, 492 kn) at 26,000 ft
- Maximum speed: Mach 0.82
- Cruise speed: 504 mph (811 km/h, 438 kn)
- Range: 1,644 mi (2,645 km, 1,430 nmi)
- Service ceiling: 37,000 ft (11,000 m)

== See also ==
Related development

- McDonnell Douglas DC-9
- McDonnell Douglas MD-80
- McDonnell Douglas MD-90
- Comac C909

Aircraft of comparable role, configuration, and era

- Airbus A318
- Avro RJ
- Boeing 737-600
- Fokker 100
- Embraer ERJ family
- Tupolev Tu-134
- Yakovlev Yak-42

Related lists

- List of jet airliners
