= AirTran Airways =

Low-cost airline of the United States (1993–2014)

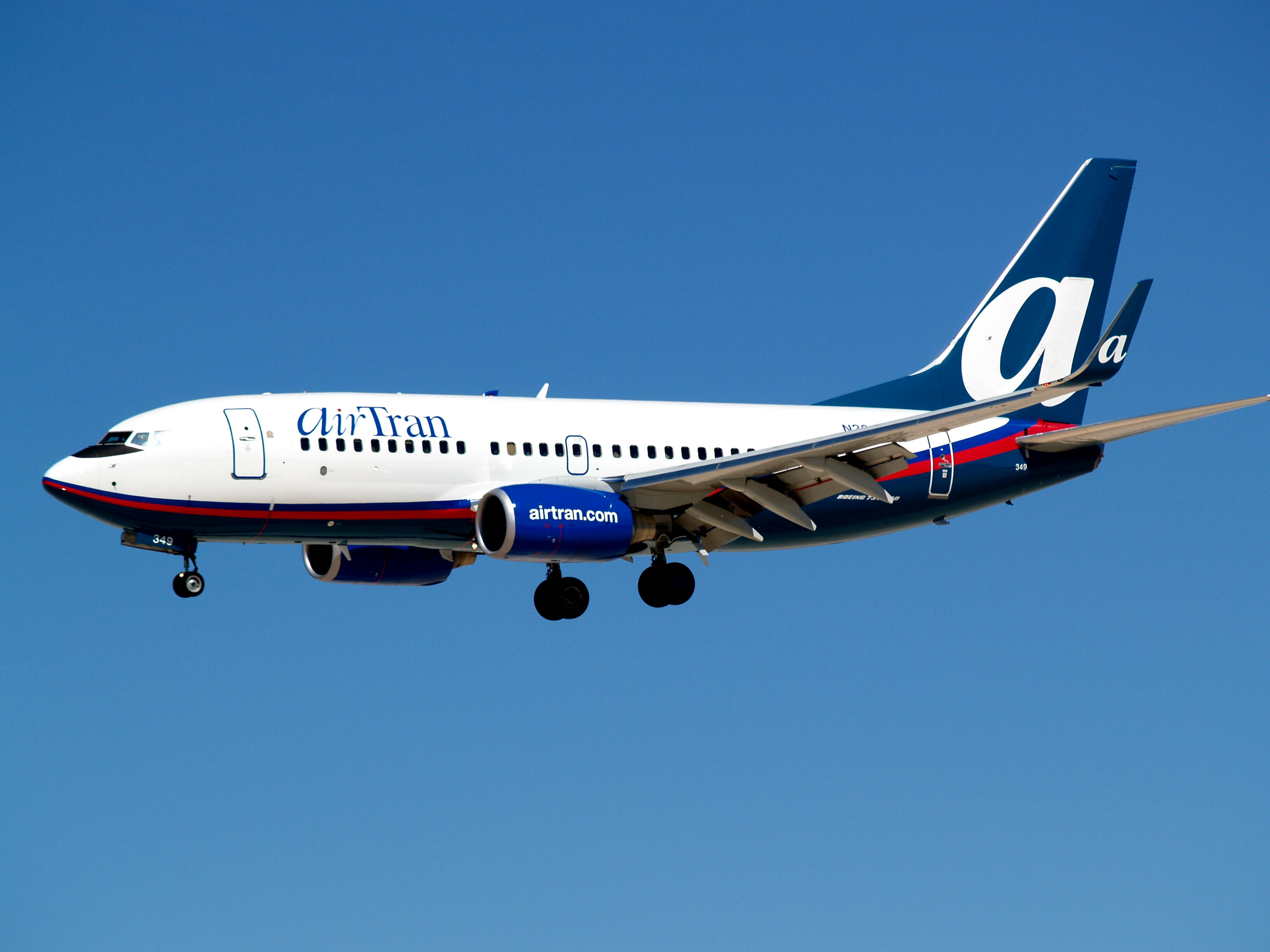
- AirTran Airways 737-700
IATA	ICAO	Call sign
FL	TRS	CITRUS
- Founded: 1993 (as Conquest Sun Airlines)
- Ceased operations: December 28, 2014 (integrated into Southwest Airlines)
- Operating bases: Atlanta; Baltimore; Milwaukee; Orlando
- Frequent-flyer program: A+ Rewards
- Subsidiaries: AirTran JetConnect (2002–2004)
- Parent company: AirTran Corporation (1994–1995); Airways Corporation (1995–1997); AirTran Holdings (1997–2011); Southwest Airlines (2011–2014)
- Headquarters: Orlando, Florida, United States
- Key people: Gary C. Kelly; Bob Jordan; Bob Fornaro

AirTran Airways was a low-cost airline in the United States headquartered in Orlando, Florida.

AirTran Airways was established in 1993 as Conquest Sun Airlines by the management of two small airlines, Destination Sun Airways and Conquest Airlines, with Conquest Airlines co-founder Victor Rivas being heavily involved in the establishment of Conquest Sun. The airline was purchased by the AirTran Corporation in 1994 and was renamed AirTran Airways. The airline was later spun off under the new Airways Corporation holding company by the AirTran Corporation.

The airline and the Airways Corporation holding company was purchased in 1997 by the ValuJet holding company, which owned the struggling ValuJet Airlines. The ValuJet holding company became known as AirTran Holdings and merged ValuJet Airlines into AirTran Airways. ValuJet Airlines was renamed "AirTran Airlines" before it was merged into AirTran Airways.

AirTran Airways and parent AirTran Holdings were acquired by Southwest Airlines on May 2, 2011, and gradually integrated, with AirTran's final revenue flight operating on December 28, 2014.

AirTran operated nearly 700 daily flights, primarily in the eastern and midwestern United States, with its principal hub at Hartsfield-Jackson Atlanta International Airport, where it operated nearly 200 daily departures. AirTran's fleet consisted of Boeing 717-200 aircraft, of which it was the world's largest operator, and Boeing 737-700 aircraft.

== History ==
=== Establishment & early years ===
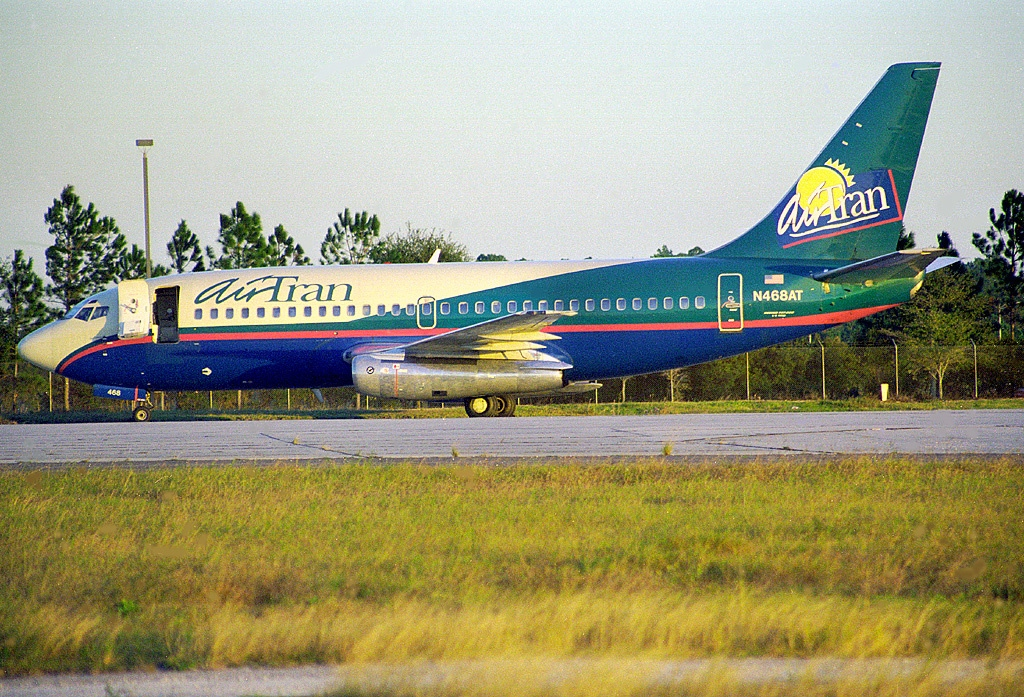
An AirTran Boeing 737-200 in the original livery at Orlando International Airport

AirTran Airways was founded in 1993 as Conquest Sun Airlines and began operations as a start up Boeing 737-200 operator with service to and from Orlando.

AirTran Airways was established by both the management of Destination Sun Airways and the management of regional airline Conquest Airlines. The establishment of Destination Sun Airways is unclear. It is claimed that Destination Sun was established in 1991 by former Northeastern International Airways CEO Guy Lindley and that the airline was formerly known as SunExpress and based in Fort Lauderdale, Florida. Another source claimed that Destination Sun was established in 1990 by a bunch of pilots that are presumably ex-Eastern Air Lines pilots since it was claimed later on by the AirTran management that the establishment of AirTran involved former Eastern Air Lines employees. Meanwhile, Conquest Airlines was founded by Rafael Rivas and Victor Rivas in April 1988 in Texas. Victor Rivas, co-founder of Conquest Airlines, was also heavily involved in the establishment of Conquest Sun Airlines.

In 1994, the airline was purchased by the AirTran Corporation, which was the holding company of the Minneapolis-based Mesaba Airlines, an operating carrier for Northwest Airlines's Northwest Airlink that had hubs in Minneapolis and Detroit. After the purchase, the airline was renamed from Conquest Sun Airlines to AirTran Airways to reflect the name of the holding company. The airline moved its headquarters to Orlando and grew to 11 Boeing 737 aircraft, serving 24 cities in the Eastern and Midwestern United States, providing low-fare leisure travel to Orlando.

In 1995, AirTran Corporation created a new subsidiary called Airways Corporation and placed AirTran Airways under the new subsidiary; AirTran Corporation then spun off the new Airways Corporation as an independent holding company which includes AirTran Airways. After the spin off, AirTran Corporation was renamed Mesaba Holdings after its subsidiary Mesaba Airlines to distance itself from AirTran Airways. AirTran Corporation/Mesaba Holdings was finally renamed MAIR Holdings, which was finally dissolved in July 2012.

=== Merger with ValuJet ===
==== The process ====
On July 10, 1997, ValuJet, Inc., the parent company of the struggling ValuJet Airlines, entered into an agreement to acquire AirTran Airways and its parent Airways Corporation. After the losses of both ValuJet Flight 597 and ValuJet Flight 592, ValuJet suffered due to the perception of a lax safety culture, putting its business in jeopardy.

ValuJet purchased Airways Corporation on November 17, 1997. On that date, AirTran Airways and its parent Airways Corporation became subsidiaries of ValuJet. The ValuJet holding company changed its name to AirTran Holdings, Inc. and renamed ValuJet Airlines to AirTran Airlines. AirTran Holdings then operated two airlines with the AirTran name: AirTran Airways and AirTran Airlines (formerly ValuJet Airlines). AirTran Holdings retained ValuJet's stock price history. The AirTran name was chosen by the merged airline's management in hopes of distancing itself from the troubled ValuJet past. AirTran Holdings moved its headquarters to the AirTran Airways headquarters in Orlando on January 28, 1998, while ValuJet's Atlanta hub remained the hub for the combined AirTran Airways/Airlines operation.

In April 1998, AirTran Holdings transferred all of AirTran Airlines' fleet and operations to AirTran Airways and canceled AirTran Airlines' FAA certificate. AirTran Airways now became the only airline operator for AirTran Holdings and AirTran Airlines became an inactive subsidiary of AirTran Holdings. In August 1999, AirTran Airlines was merged into AirTran Airways, legally ending the ValuJet legacy.

==== Criticism ====
Even though AirTran Airways was the surviving airline with its absorption of the former ValuJet Airlines which ended its operations as AirTran Airlines, ValuJet Airlines was the nominal corporate survivor of the merger. ValuJet's management team ran the merged airline, and all SEC filings prior to 1997 were under ValuJet, not AirTran. Adding to the confusion, AirTran management did not put an effort into explaining the correct history of AirTran thoroughly.

The AirTran airline operation received criticism for the name change with Time magazine writing, "In a corporate disappearing act, the troubled airline bought a smaller rival and adopted its name, becoming AirTran Airways." The Los Angeles Times wrote in the Summer of 1997, "After more than a year of reminding too many people of a disaster rather than low fares, ValuJet on Thursday said it would take a new name. ValuJet is buying a much smaller airline, AirTran Airways, from Airways Corp. for $66.3 million worth of stock and taking its name."

In an article in The Atlantic entitled "The Lessons of ValuJet 592," William Langewiesche presents a case in which the May 11, 1996 crash in the Florida Everglades as an example of a system accident, in which the complexity of the overall operation was the major contributing factor. Taking a contrary position, Brian Stimpson argues in the Manitoba Professional Engineer that there are other examples of studied complex operations which have been routinely performed safely for many years, with such examples including large aircraft carriers and the Diablo Canyon Nuclear Power Station in California.

AirTran made almost no mention of its ValuJet past. However, on the tenth anniversary of the Flight 592 crash, AirTran made no major corporate announcements out of respect for the victims' families.

=== Turnaround ===
In January 1999, a new management team led by Joe Leonard, a veteran of Eastern Air Lines, and Robert L. Fornaro, of US Airways, took the reins at the airline. The two recruited a new senior management team, including Stephen J. Kolski, Operations, Kevin P. Healy, Planning, and Loral Blinde, Human Resources. The immediate goals were to stabilize the balance sheet and prepare to refinance debt due in early 2000, fix the operations, increase and establish revenue streams and prepare for delivery and operation of the Boeing 717. AirTran was the launch customer and ultimately the largest operator of this brand new aircraft. At the same time, Leonard was determined to not only lead the turn around of the carrier, but establish a culture of trust and entrepreneurship at AirTran.

=== 2000s ===
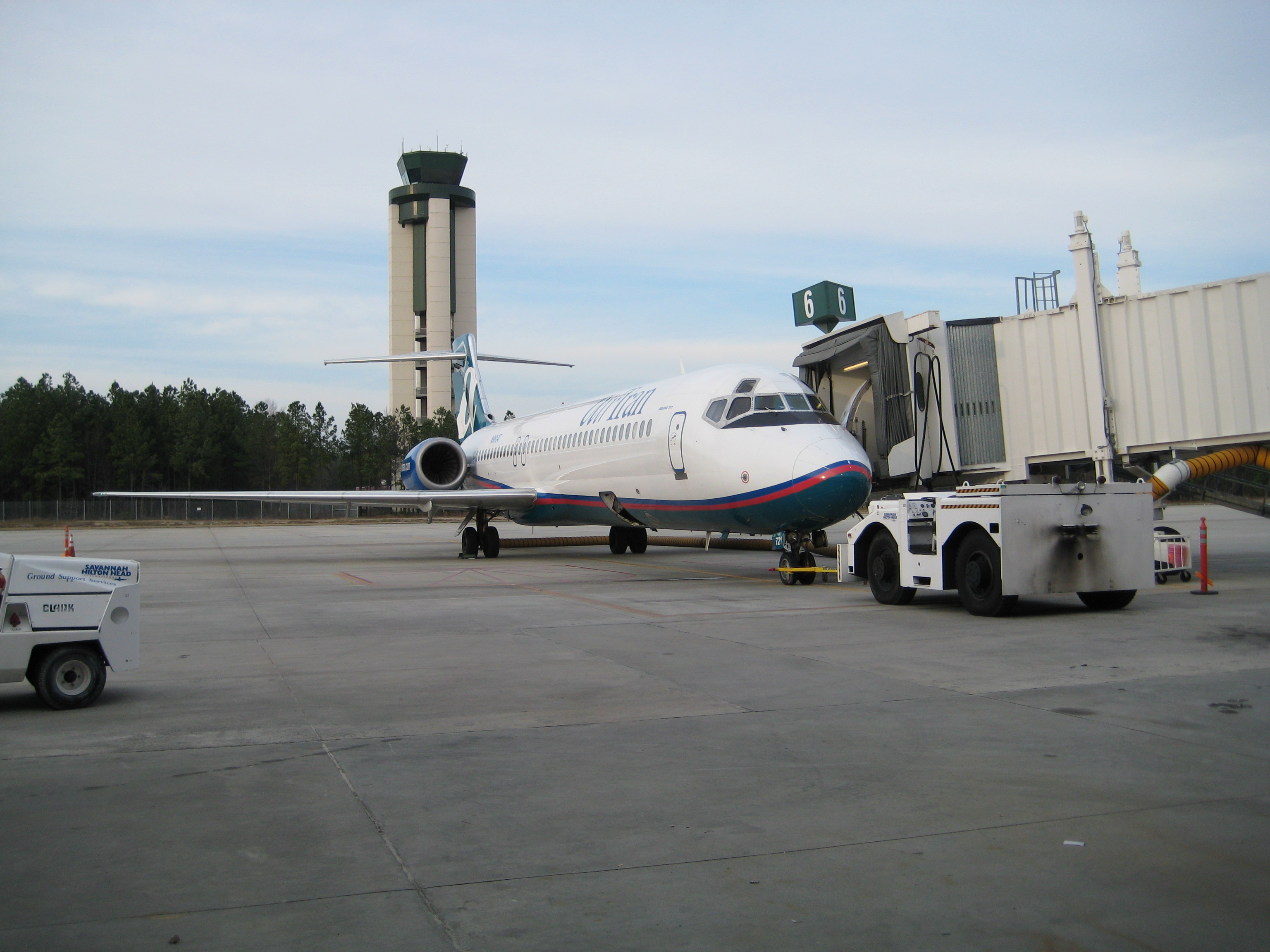
AirTran received the last Boeing 717 built in 2006

In 1999, AirTran reported a $30 million operating profit.

On August 15, 2001, the company's stock began trading under the ticker symbol AAI on the New York Stock Exchange.

In 2002, AirTran created a regional brand, AirTran JetConnect, operated by Air Wisconsin.

In 2003, following an order for 100 Boeing 737-700 aircraft, AirTran began service to Washington, D.C.'s Reagan National Airport and to San Francisco.

On January 5, 2004, AirTran's last McDonnell Douglas DC-9-30 was retired, leaving it with a fleet of more than 70 Boeing 717-200s. Shortly after, the first Boeing 737-700 entered AirTran's fleet in June 2004.

In August 2004, AirTran JetConnect (operated by Air Wisconsin) ceased all operations.

On May 23, 2006, AirTran accepted one of the last two Boeing 717s delivered in a ceremony with Midwest Airlines, who accepted the other 717. Boeing closed the 717 line due to poor sales.

In November 2007, Robert L. Fornaro took over as CEO, as well as president. Joe Leonard remained chairman of the Board of Directors until June 2008. Upon his retirement, Fornaro then became chairman making him chairman, president and CEO.

In 2009, AirTran was the first major airline to have 100% of its fleet outfitted with Gogo Inflight Internet, although other airlines had begun adding Internet before AirTran.

By 2009, AirTran underwent major expansion in smaller cities such as Yeager Airport (Charleston, W.V.); Asheville Regional Airport, N.C.; and Harrisburg International Airport, Pa.

==== Failed acquisitions ====
In 2004, AirTran sought a major expansion at Chicago-Midway Airport by buying the leases of ATA Airlines' 14 gates. Southwest Airlines made a higher bid for the gates, and AirTran lost the deal.

In December 2006, Air Tran Holdings announced that it had been trying to acquire Midwest Air Group. On August 12, 2007, AirTran announced its attempt to purchase Midwest Airlines had expired, while TPG Capital, in partnership with Northwest Airlines, had entered into an agreement to purchase Midwest Airlines for an amount larger than the AirTran Airways' proposal. However, on August 14, 2007, AirTran increased its offer to the equivalent of $16.25 a share, slightly more than the $16 a share from TPG Capital investors group. However, Midwest announced TPG would increase its offer to $17 per share and a definitive agreement had been reached late on August 16, 2007.

On September 21, 2007, AirTran pilots, represented by the National Pilots Association, rejected the carrier's contract proposal. Two weeks earlier, the pilots voted to dump the union president and vice president. On April 10, 2009, 87% of the pilots at AirTran voted to merge the National Pilots Association with the world's largest pilot union, Air Line Pilots Association (ALPA).

=== 2010s ===
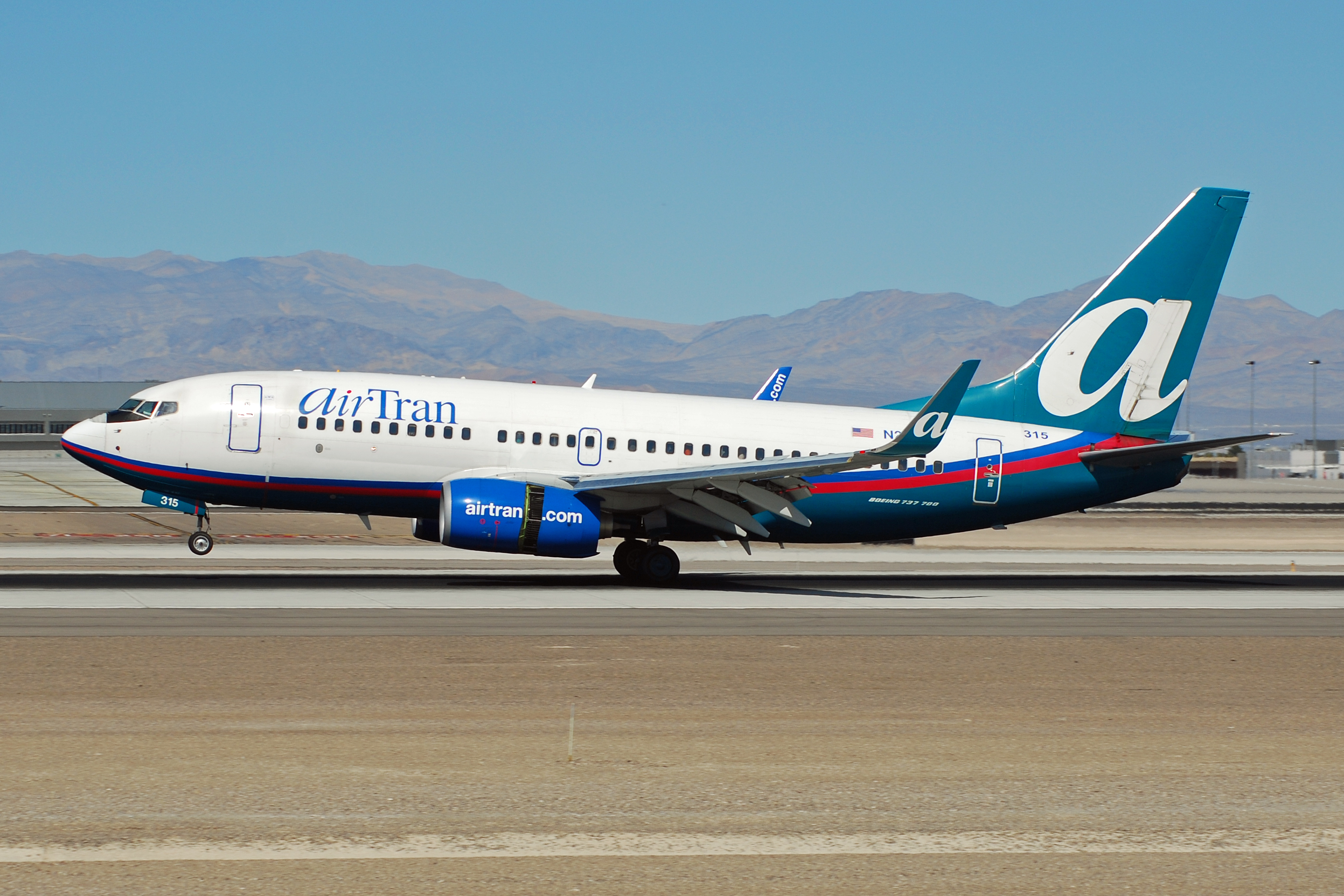
An AirTran 737-700 which the airline continued to receive until the acquisition by Southwest

On April 6, 2010, AirTran Airways opened their second crew base, at General Mitchell International Airport in Milwaukee, the same day they officially announced Milwaukee as their second hub.

On July 27, 2010, AirTran Airways hosted the grand opening of their new System Operations Control (SOC) Center at Orlando International Airport. This 16,000-square-foot (1,500 m^{2}), $6.9 million, state-of-the-art command center served as the 24-hour nerve center for the entire airline with over 700 flights per day. The company employed more than 1,000 crew members in central Florida at several facilities, including their corporate headquarters, the SOC, and a maintenance facility in addition to passengers operations at the airport. After considering putting the SOC Center in Atlanta, where AirTran has their largest hub, the decision was made to expand the facility in Orlando adjacent to AirTran's headquarters.

In October 2010, a new crew base opened at Orlando International Airport in Orlando, Florida. The base initially employed 100 pilots, including a chief pilot.

In April 2011, AirTran had the best safety record among U.S. carriers as measured by the number of incidents such as bird strikes. AirTran was first with only 0.0000196 incidents per flight, Southwest second with 0.0000203, and US Airways third with 0.0000203 incidents per flight. Bill Voss, who was then head of the Flight Safety Foundation, said "the safety record in the U.S. is so good that it's very difficult to find enough accidents or incidents to draw much of a conclusion about who's safest."

Prior to the winding down of the airline, AirTran grew to serve more than 70 cities coast-to-coast as well as in the Caribbean and Mexico. It had over 700 daily flights and 8,500 crew members, and served nearly 25 million passengers per year.

==== Buyout and wind-down ====
On September 27, 2010, Southwest Airlines announced they would acquire AirTran Airways and parent AirTran Holdings for a total cost of $1.4 billion. The acquisition gave Southwest a significant presence at many of AirTran's hubs, such as Atlanta (then the largest U.S. city without Southwest service) and Milwaukee as well as expanded service in Baltimore and Orlando. With the acquisition, Southwest added international service to several leisure destinations such as Cancún, Montego Bay, and Aruba. Southwest integrated AirTran's fleet of Boeing 737-700 series aircraft into Southwest Airlines brand and livery, and the Boeing 717-200 fleet was then leased out to Delta Air Lines starting in mid-2013. The airlines planned to have the acquisition completed and finalized within two years, with the two carriers operating as separate airlines in the interim. The deal closed on May 2, 2011, and a single operating certificate for the combined carrier was achieved on March 1, 2012. Total integration of all employee groups between the two carriers was completed in 2015.

On February 14, 2013, Southwest Airlines announced that they had begun codesharing with AirTran. They took the first step on January 25, 2013 by launching shared itineraries in five markets. Southwest continued launching shared itineraries with 39 more markets beginning February 25, 2013. By April 2013, shared itineraries were scheduled to be available in all Southwest and AirTran cities (both domestic and international).

Southwest announced that the integration would be completed on December 28, 2014, with AirTran Airways Flight 1 as the final scheduled departure for the airline, flying with a Boeing 717-200 (N717JL) from Atlanta's Hartsfield-Jackson Atlanta International Airport (ATL) to Tampa International Airport (TPA). The flight used the callsign "Critter" as a nod to ValuJet. This route and flight number had been ValuJet's first flight.

== Corporate affairs ==
Prior to its acquisition, AirTran's corporate headquarters were located in Orlando, Florida. Prior to 1994, the headquarters were in Minneapolis, Minnesota.

=== Employee relations ===
AirTran adopted an approach to employee recruitment similar to Southwest Airlines, with an emphasis on functional skills and relational competence. The airline had clear job specialization with the expectation of flexibility between jobs as required by day-to-day operational circumstances. AirTran's training approach involved drawing the link between individual job performance, the airline's overall financial performance and the importance of achieving high levels of customer service and efficiency.

== Destinations ==
When the acquisition by Southwest was announced, AirTran served 69 destinations throughout the United States, Puerto Rico and abroad.

=== Top served cities ===
AirTran Airways top served cities (As of March 2013)
City	Daily departures	Number of gates	Cities served nonstop	Service began
Atlanta	171	31	43	1993
Orlando	56	8	23	1993
Baltimore	47	7	15	2001
Milwaukee	30	8	6	2002
Indianapolis	20	4	14	2005
Fort Myers	19	3	13	1997
Tampa	17	3	12	1993
Fort Lauderdale	15	3	7	1993
Washington–National	11	3	3	2003
Pittsburgh	12	2	5	2000
Akron/Canton	10	4	6	1996

== Fleet ==
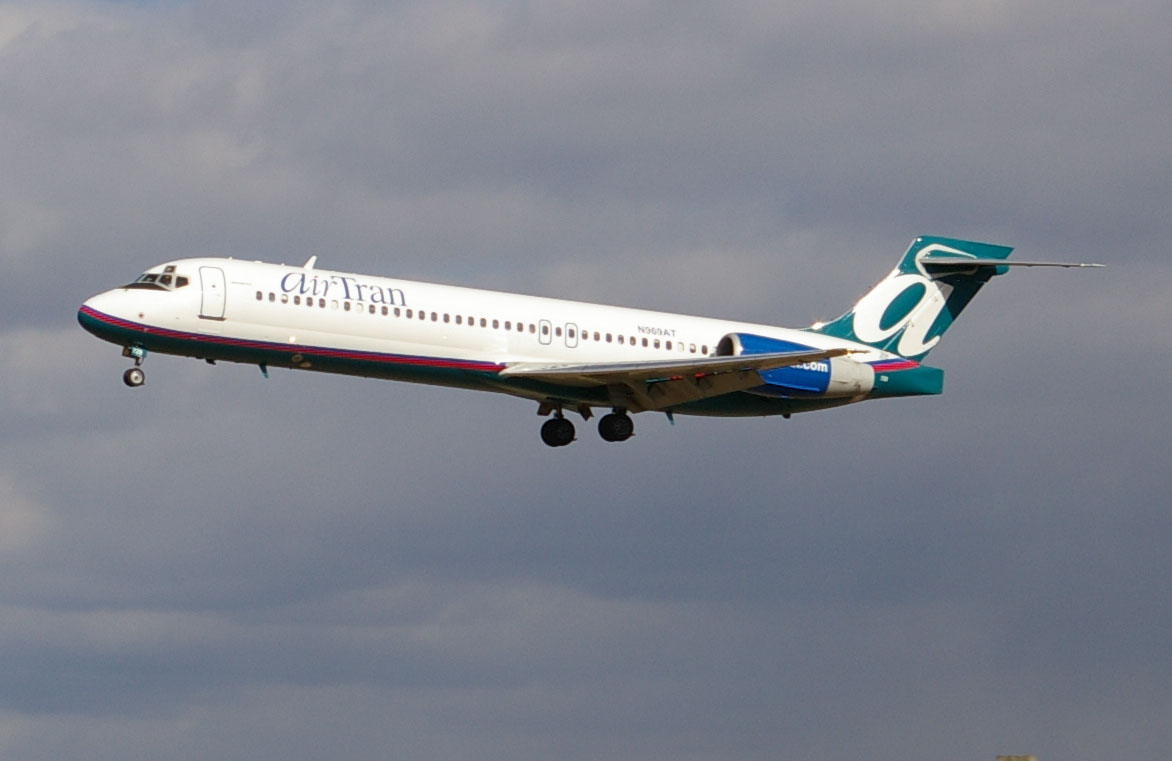
AirTran Airways 717-200

Prior to being acquired by Southwest, the AirTran fleet maxed at the following aircraft:

Aircraft	In service	Passengers			Notes
Aircraft	In service	J	Y	Total	Notes
Boeing 717-200	88	12	105	117	Launch customer. Southwest leased all aircraft to Delta Air Lines.
Boeing 737-700	52	12	125	137	All were transferred to Southwest Airlines.
Total	140				

In addition, AirTran's 717 fleet included the first and last 717 ever built.

=== Retired fleet ===
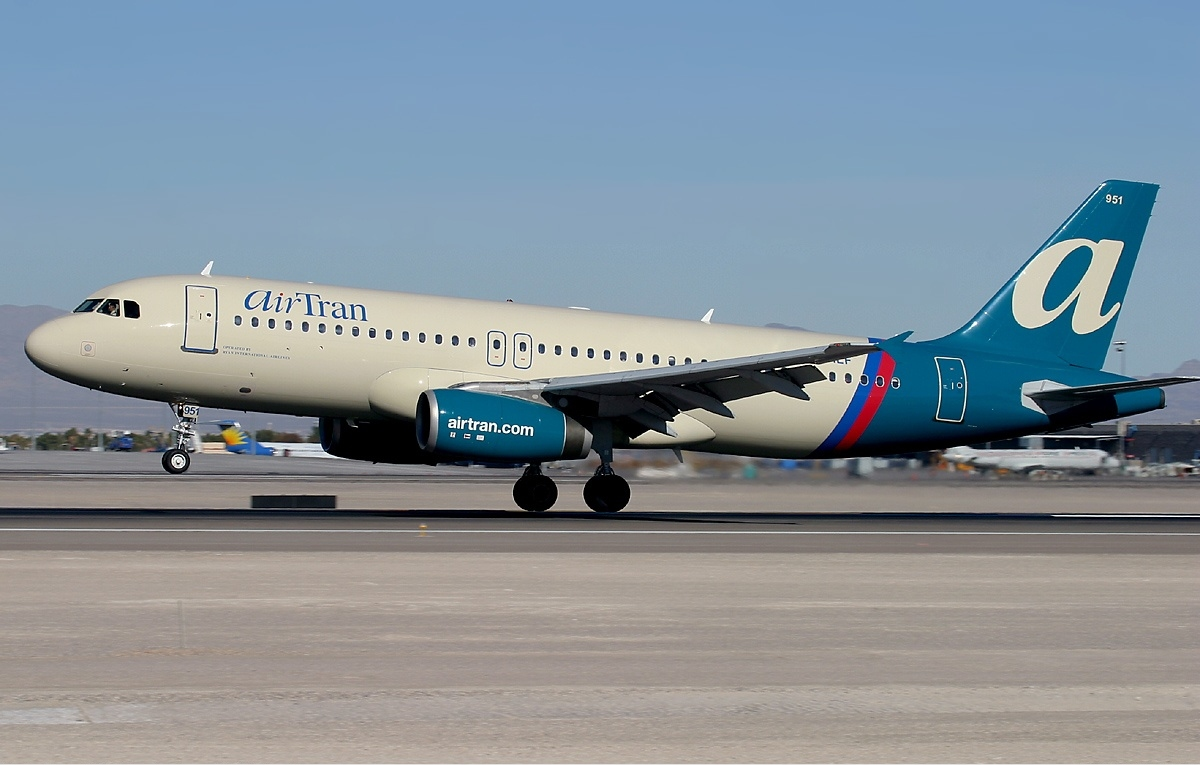
Ryan International Airlines operated Airbus A320 jets for AirTran on new flights to the U.S. west coast prior to AirTran receiving new 737-700 aircraft

- Airbus A320-200 (operated by Ryan International Airlines for new U.S. west coast service prior to new 737-700 deliveries)
- Boeing 737-200
- Bombardier CRJ200 (AirTran JetConnect service operated by Air Wisconsin and SkyWest via respective code share agreements)
- McDonnell Douglas DC-9-30 (former ValuJet Airlines aircraft)

== Cabin ==
AirTran Airways operated a two-class configuration featuring Business Class and Economy Class. Business class included rows 1–3 and economy began with row 10; rows 4–9 were skipped for numbering purposes and 13 was skipped due to superstition.

== Livery ==
AirTran's livery was primarily white, with teal on the ventral side. The sections were divided by parallel red and pink stripes, which ran horizontal at the front and started to curve upward at the wings until they reached the top side of the plane at the back of the vertical stabilizer. The nacelles were royal blue, with "airtran.com" written in white Helvetica font. The logo version of "AirTran" was written toward the front on either side in teal above the passenger windows and the vertical stabilizer was teal with a prominent white cursive "A," just like the beginning of the logo.

AirTran Airways also created several special livery aircraft. They included an aircraft featuring Elton John and Danica Patrick. AirTran also partnered with the Orlando/Orange County CVB to create a Boeing 717 aircraft emblazoned with a "Say YES to Orlando" logo on each side and a second Boeing 717 saying "Orlando Makes Me Smile," which celebrated AirTran Airways' partnership with the OOCVB to promote travel to the city. The airline also had an aircraft paying tribute to the Wizarding World of Harry Potter at Universal Orlando.

Several aircraft featured sports-related liveries. The teams represented were the Atlanta Falcons, Baltimore Ravens, Indianapolis Colts, Orlando Magic, and Milwaukee Brewers.

On February 12, 2010, AirTran Airways celebrated Little Debbie's 50th anniversary by launching a one-of-a-kind, custom-designed Boeing 717, dubbed Little Debbie 1.

== Incidents and accidents ==
ValuJet and AirTran Incidents and Accidents
Flight	Date	Aircraft	Location	Description	Injuries		
Flight	Date	Aircraft	Location	Description	Fatal	Serious	Minor
AirTran Airways 426	May 7, 1998	Douglas DC-9-32	Calhoun, GA	Flight crew failed to maintain adequate separation from hazardous meteorological conditions. The investigation revealed that the captain had been involved in two other air carrier incidents involving adverse weather conditions. It also revealed that the airline lacked adequate training and guidance regarding hazardous weather interpretation and avoidance, as well as adequate procedures to notify flight attendants about potential turbulence. A flight attendant and a passenger were seriously injured during a turbulence encounter.		2	
AirTran Airways 867	November 1, 1998	Boeing 737-200	Atlanta, GA	Lost control and skidded off of the runway while landing, with main landing gear in a drainage ditch and its empennage extending over the taxiway. The nose gear was folded back into the electrical/electronic compartment and turned 90 degrees from its normal, extended position. The cause was an improperly repaired hydraulic line leak.			13
AirTran Airways 913	August 8, 2000	Douglas DC-9-32	Greensboro, NC	The flight crew executed an emergency landing at Greensboro. Shortly after takeoff, the flight crew declared an emergency due to an in-flight fire and smoke in the cockpit. An emergency evacuation was performed. Of the 58 passengers and 5 crewmembers on board, 5 passengers and 3 crewmembers received minor injuries from smoke inhalation. Five passengers and one ground crewmember received minor injuries during the evacuation. The airplane sustained substantial fire, heat, and smoke damage and was written off. The flight was operating to Atlanta.			13
AirTran Airways 956	November 29, 2000	Douglas DC-9-32	Atlanta, GA	The flight crew executed an emergency landing in Atlanta. Shortly after takeoff, the flight crew observed that several circuit breakers had tripped and several annunciator panel lights had illuminated. After the landing, one of the flight attendants reported to the flight crew that smoke could be seen emanating from the left sidewall in the forward cabin; air traffic control personnel also notified the flight crew that smoke was coming from the airplane. The flight crew then initiated an emergency evacuation on one of the taxiways. Of the 2 flight crewmembers, 3 flight attendants, and 92 passengers on board, 13 passengers received minor injuries. The airplane sustained substantial damage and was written off. The flight was operating to Akron, OH.			13
AirTran Airways 67	January 20, 2002	Douglas DC-9-32	Washington D.C.	The aircraft had started its engines prior to pushback due to an inoperative APU. Due to ice on the ramp, the aircraft lurched forward, impacting the pushback tug. Investigators determined that the pushback tug operator lacked guidance on icy ramps. The aircraft sustained substantial damage, but it was repaired and returned to service.			
AirTran Airways 356	March 26, 2003	Boeing 717	New York City, NY	On approach to LaGuardia Airport, the aircraft's left power control distribution power unit (PCDU) failed. The pilots also reported smelling smoke in the cockpit and cabin. The flight crew executed an emergency landing and initiated an emergency evacuation on a taxiway. Of the 2 flight crew members, 3 flight attendants, and 78 passengers on board, one passenger received serious injuries and 22 passengers sustained minor injuries during the evacuation. The aircraft sustained minor damage. The flight had originated in Atlanta.		1	22
AirTran Airways 527	November 10, 2006	Boeing 717	Memphis, TN	The flight crew taxied the aircraft into a grass median and the nose landing gear impacted a concrete drainage ditch. The nose landing gear assembly collapsed and the forward pressure bulkhead was punctured. According to the Airport Safety and Certification Division, FAA Southern Region, all of the taxiway signs and taxiway lights were lit and working properly at the time of the accident. The cause was the captain's inadequate visual look out during taxi.			

== See also ==
- List of defunct airlines of the United States
