= List of TWA destinations =

This is a list of destinations served by Trans World Airlines (TWA) at the time of its closure. It was taken over by American Airlines in 2001. Destinations served by Trans World Express and Trans World Connection (as American Eagle) do not appear here.

== List ==
=== Africa ===
- Egypt
  - Cairo - Cairo International Airport

=== Americas ===
==== Caribbean ====
- Antigua and Barbuda
  - St. John's - V.C. Bird International Airport
- Aruba
  - Oranjestad - Queen Beatrix International Airport
- Bahamas
  - Freeport - Grand Bahama International Airport
  - Nassau - Nassau International Airport
- Dominican Republic
  - Puerto Plata - Gregorio Luperón International Airport
  - Punta Cana - Punta Cana International Airport
  - Santo Domingo - Las Américas International Airport
- Jamaica
  - Montego Bay - Sangster International Airport
- Netherlands Antilles (now Sint Maarten)
  - Philipsburg - Princess Juliana International Airport Seasonal
- Puerto Rico
  - San Juan - Luis Muñoz Marín International Airport Hub
- Trinidad and Tobago
  - Port of Spain - Piarco International Airport
- Turks and Caicos Islands
  - Providenciales - Providenciales International Airport
  - St. Lucia-Hewannora

==== North America ====
- Canada
  - Toronto - Toronto Pearson International Airport
  - Vancouver - Vancouver International Airport
- Mexico
  - Cancún - Cancún International Airport
- United States
  - Alaska
    - Anchorage - Ted Stevens International Airport
  - Arizona
    - Phoenix - Sky Harbor International Airport
  - Arkansas
    - Little Rock - Little Rock National Airport
  - California
    - Los Angeles - Los Angeles International Airport Hub
    - Ontario - LA/Ontario International Airport
    - Sacramento - Sacramento International Airport
    - San Diego - San Diego International Airport
    - San Francisco - San Francisco International Airport
    - San Jose - San Jose International Airport
    - Santa Ana/Orange County - John Wayne Airport
  - Colorado
    - Colorado Springs - Colorado Springs Airport
    - Denver - Denver International Airport
    - Hayden/Steamboat Springs - Yampa Valley Airport Seasonal
  - Connecticut
    - Hartford - Bradley International Airport
  - Florida
    - Fort Lauderdale - Fort Lauderdale–Hollywood International Airport
    - Fort Myers - Southwest Florida Regional Airport
    - Jacksonville - Jacksonville International Airport
    - Miami - Miami International Airport
    - Orlando - Orlando International Airport
    - Tampa - Tampa International Airport
  - Georgia
    - Atlanta - William B. Hartsfield International Airport
  - Hawaii
    - Honolulu - Honolulu International Airport
    - Kona - Kona International Airport
    - Maui - Kahului International Airport
  - Illinois
    - Chicago - O'Hare International Airport
    - Moline - Quad City International Airport
  - Indiana
    - Indianapolis - Indianapolis International Airport
  - Iowa
    - Cedar Rapids - The Eastern Iowa Airport
    - Des Moines - Des Moines International Airport
  - Kansas
    - Wichita - Wichita Mid–Continent Airport
  - Kentucky
    - Louisville - Louisville International Airport
  - Louisiana
    - New Orleans - Louis Armstrong International Airport
  - Maine
    - Portland - Portland International Jetport
  - Maryland
    - Baltimore - Baltimore/Washington International Airport
  - Massachusetts
    - Boston - Logan International Airport
  - Michigan
    - Detroit - Detroit Metropolitan Airport
  - Minnesota
    - Minneapolis/St. Paul - Minneapolis–Saint Paul International Airport
  - Missouri
    - Kansas City - Kansas City International Airport
    - Springfield/Branson - Springfield–Branson National Airport
    - St. Louis - Lambert–St. Louis International Airport Hub
  - Nebraska
    - Lincoln - Lincoln Airport
    - Omaha - Eppley Airfield
  - Nevada
    - Las Vegas - McCarran International Airport
  - New Mexico
    - Albuquerque - Albuquerque International Sunport
  - New Jersey
    - Newark - Newark Liberty International Airport
  - New York
    - New York City
      - John F. Kennedy International Airport Hub
      - LaGuardia Airport
  - North Carolina
    - Charlotte - Charlotte Douglas International Airport
    - Raleigh/Durham - Raleigh–Durham International Airport
  - Ohio
    - Cleveland - Hopkins International Airport
    - Columbus - Port Columbus International Airport
    - Dayton - Dayton International Airport
  - Oklahoma
    - Oklahoma City - Will Rogers World Airport
    - Tulsa - Tulsa International Airport
  - Oregon
    - Portland - Portland International Airport
  - Pennsylvania
    - Philadelphia - Philadelphia International Airport
    - Pittsburgh - Pittsburgh International Airport
  - South Dakota
    - Sioux Falls - Sioux Falls Regional Airport
  - Tennessee
    - Nashville - Nashville International Airport
  - Texas
    - Austin - Austin–Bergstrom International Airport
    - Dallas/Fort Worth - Dallas/Fort Worth International Airport
    - El Paso/Ciudad Juárez/Las Cruces - El Paso International Airport
    - Houston - George Bush Intercontinental Airport
    - McAllen - McAllen International Airport
    - San Antonio - San Antonio International Airport
  - Utah
    - Salt Lake City - Salt Lake City International Airport
  - Virginia
    - Norfolk/Virginia Beach/Williamsburg - Norfolk International Airport
    - Richmond - Richmond International Airport
  - Washington, D.C.
    - Washington Dulles International Airport
    - Ronald Reagan Washington National Airport
  - Washington
    - Seattle - Seattle–Tacoma International Airport
  - Wisconsin
    - Milwaukee - General Mitchell International Airport

=== Asia ===
==== Northeast Asia ====
- Hong Kong
  - Hong Kong - Chek Lap Kok International Airport
- Japan
  - Tokyo
    - Tokyo International Airport
    - Narita International Airport
  - Osaka - Kansai International Airport
  - Okinawa - Naha Airport
- Taiwan
  - Taipei - Chiang Kai-Shek International Airport

==== Southeast Asia ====
- Philippines
  - Manila - Ninoy Aquino International Airport
- Thailand
  - Bangkok - Don Mueang International Airport

==== South Asia ====
- India
  - Mumbai - Chhatrapati Shivaji Maharaj International Airport
- Sri Lanka
  - Colombo - Bandaranaike International Airport

==== West Asia ====
- Israel
  - Tel Aviv - Ben Gurion Airport
- Kuwait
  - Kuwait City - Kuwait international Airport

=== Europe ===
==== Central Europe ====
- Austria
  - Vienna - Vienna International Airport
- Germany
  - Berlin
    - Berlin Schönefeld Airport
    - Berlin Tegel Airport
    - Berlin Tempelhof Airport
  - Frankfurt - Frankfurt Airport
  - Hamburg - Hamburg Airport
  - Munich - Munich Airport
  - Stuttgart - Stuttgart Airport
- Switzerland
  - Geneva - Geneva Airport
  - Zürich - Zürich Airport

==== Northern Europe ====
- Denmark
  - Copenhagen - Copenhagen Airport
- Finland
  - Helsinki - Helsinki Airport
- Norway
  - Oslo - Oslo Gardermoen Airport
- Sweden
  - Stockholm - Stockholm Arlanda Airport

==== Southern Europe ====
- Italy
  - Milan - Milan Malpensa Airport
  - Rome - Leonardo da Vinci–Fiumicino Airport
- Portugal
  - Lisbon - Lisbon Portela Airport
  - Santa Maria Island - Santa Maria Airport
  - Terceira - Lajes Airport
- Spain
  - Barcelona - Josep Tarradellas Barcelona–El Prat Airport
  - Madrid - Adolfo Suárez Madrid–Barajas Airport
  - Málaga - Málaga Airport

==== Southeastern Europe ====
- Greece
  - Athens - Ellinikon International Airport
- Turkey
  - Istanbul - Istanbul Atatürk Airport

==== Western Europe ====
- Belgium
  - Brussels - Brussels Airport
- France
  - Nice - Nice Côte d'Azur Airport
  - Paris - Charles de Gaulle Airport
- Ireland
  - Dublin - Dublin Airport
  - Shannon - Shannon Airport
- Netherlands
  - Amsterdam - Amsterdam Airport Schiphol
- United Kingdom
  - London
    - Gatwick Airport
    - Heathrow Airport

== Terminated destinations before closure ==
=== Africa ===
==== East Africa ====
- Kenya
  - Nairobi - Jomo Kenyatta International Airport
- Tanzania
  - Dar es Salaam - Julius Nyerere International Airport
- Uganda
  - Entebbe - Entebbe International Airport

==== North Africa ====
- Algeria
  - Algiers - Houari Boumediene Airport
- Libya
  - Tripoli - Tripoli International Airport
- Morocco
  - Casablanca - Mohammed V International Airport
- Tunisia
  - Tunis - Tunis–Carthage International Airport

=== Americas ===
==== Caribbean ====
- Bermuda
  - St. David's - L.F. Wade International Airport
- Puerto Rico
  - Aguadilla - Rafael Hernández Airport

==== North America ====
- Canada
  - Toronto - Toronto Island Airport (service transferred to Trans World Express)
- Mexico
  - Cozumel - Cozumel International Airport Seasonal
  - Ixtapa - Ixtapa-Zihuatanejo International Airport Seasonal
  - Mexico City - Mexico City International Airport
  - Puerto Vallarta - Licenciado Gustavo Díaz Ordaz International Airport Seasonal
- United States
  - Arizona
    - Grand Canyon - Grand Canyon Airport
    - Kingman - Kingman Airport (closed)
    - Prescott - Ernest A. Love Field
    - Tucson - Tucson International Airport
    - Winslow - Winslow–Lindbergh Regional Airport
  - California
    - Burbank - Hollywood Burbank Airport
    - Fresno - Fresno Yosemite International Airport
    - Long Beach - Long Beach Airport
    - Los Angeles - Grand Central Airport (closed 1959)
    - Oakland - Oakland International Airport
    - Palm Springs - Palm Springs International Airport
    - San Francisco - San Francisco Bay Airdrome (closed 1941)
  - Colorado
    - Denver - Stapleton International Airport (closed 1995)
    - Pueblo - Pueblo Memorial Airport
  - Delaware
    - Wilmington - Wilmington Airport
  - Florida
    - Sarasota - Sarasota–Bradenton International Airport
    - West Palm Beach - Palm Beach International Airport
  - Illinois
    - Champaign - University of Illinois Willard Airport
    - Chicago - Midway International Airport
    - Peoria - General Wayne A. Downing Peoria International Airport (transferred to Trans World Express)
    - Quincy - Quincy Regional Airport
    - Rockford - Chicago Rockford International Airport
  - Indiana
    - Fort Wayne - Fort Wayne International Airport
    - Richmond - Richmond Municipal Airport
    - South Bend - South Bend International Airport
    - Terre Haute - Terre Haute Regional Airport
  - Iowa
    - Sioux City - Sioux Gateway Airport (transferred to Trans World Express)
    - Waterloo - Waterloo Regional Airport (transferred to Trans World Express)
  - Kansas
    - Topeka - Topeka Regional Airport
  - Kentucky
    - Cincinnati - Cincinnati-Northern Kentucky International Airport (transferred to Trans World Express)
    - Lexington - Blue Grass Airport
  - Louisiana
    - Shreveport - Shreveport Regional Airport (transferred to Trans World Express)
  - Maine
    - Portland - Portland International Jetport
  - Massachusetts
    - Worcester - Worcester Regional Airport
  - Minnesota
    - Rochester - Rochester International Airport (transferred to Trans World Express)
  - Mississippi
    - Jackson - Jackson-Evers International Airport
  - Nevada
    - Boulder City - Boulder City Airport
    - Reno - Reno–Tahoe International Airport
  - New Jersey
    - Camden County - Camden Central Airport (closed 1957)
  - New Mexico
    - Santa Fe - Santa Fe Municipal Airport
  - New York
    - Albany - Albany International Airport
    - Binghamton - Greater Binghamton Airport
    - Buffalo - Buffalo-Lancaster Regional Airport
    - Syracuse - Syracuse Hancock International Airport (At the time of TWA's closure in 2001, Trans World Connection operated the route.)
  - North Carolina
    - Greensboro - Piedmont Triad International Airport
  - Ohio
    - Mansfield - Mansfield Lahm Regional Airport
    - Marion - Marion Municipal Airport
    - Springfield - Springfield-Beckley Municipal Airport
    - Toledo - Toledo Express Airport
    - Zanesville - Zanesville Municipal Airport
  - Pennsylvania
    - Allentown - Lehigh Valley International Airport
    - Harrisburg - Harrisburg International Airport
    - Johnstown - Johnstown–Cambria County Airport
    - Lancaster - Lancaster Airport
    - Reading - Reading Regional Airport
    - Wilkes-Barre - Wilkes-Barre/Scranton International Airport
    - Williamsport - Williamsport Regional Airport
  - Rhode Island
    - Providence - Providence Airport
  - Tennessee
    - Knoxville - McGhee Tyson Airport
    - Memphis - Memphis International Airport (transferred to Trans World Express)
  - Texas
    - Amarillo - Rick Husband Amarillo International Airport
    - El Paso - El Paso International Airport
    - Houston - William P. Hobby Airport (served till October 25, 1998)
  - West Virginia
    - Wheeling - Wheeling Ohio County Airport
  - Wisconsin
    - Madison - Dane County Regional Airport (transferred to Trans World Express)

=== Asia ===
==== Southeast Asia ====
- Hong Kong
  - Hong Kong - Kai Tak Airport
- Japan
  - Osaka - Itami Airport
- Indonesia
  - Denpasar - Ngurah Rai International Airport

==== West Asia ====
- Bahrain
  - Manama - Bahrain International Airport
- Iraq
  - Basra - Basra International Airport
- Saudi Arabia
  - Dhahran - Dhahran International Airport
  - Riyadh - King Khaled International Airport

=== Oceania ===
- Guam
  - Agana - Antonio B. Won Pat International Airport
