= Regional airline =

Classification of scheduled air carrier

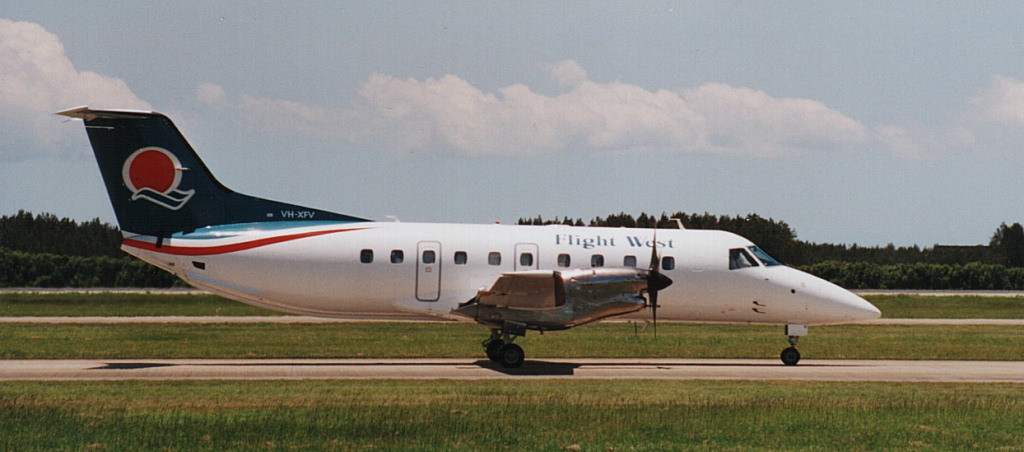
Flight West was a regional airline operating in Australia in the 1990s

A regional airline is a general classification of airline which typically operates scheduled passenger air service, using regional aircraft, between communities lacking sufficient demand or infrastructure to attract mainline flights. In North America, most regional airlines are classified as "fee-for-departure" carriers, operating their revenue flights as codeshare services contracted by one or more major airline partners. A number of regional airlines, particularly during the 1960s and 1970s, were classified as commuter airlines in the Official Airline Guide (OAG).

== History ==
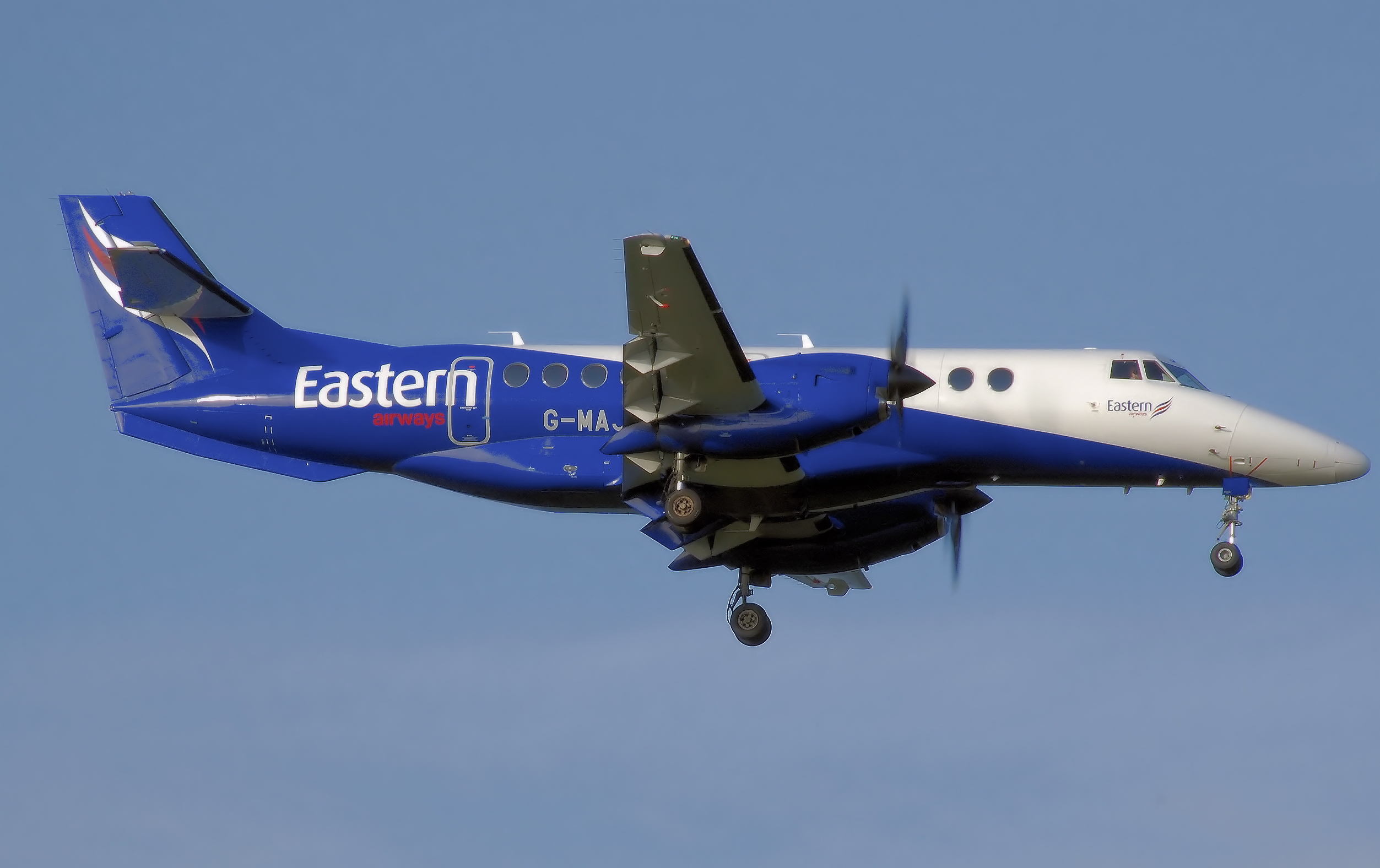
British Aerospace Jetstream 41 of the former UK regional airline Eastern Airways

=== Background ===
Decades before the advent of jet airliners and high-speed, long-range air service, commercial aviation was structured similarly to rail transport networks. In this era, technological limitations on air navigation and propeller-driven aircraft performance imposed strict constraints on the potential length of each flight; some routes covered less than 100 miles (160 km).

As such, airlines structured their services along point-to-point routes with many stops between the originating and terminating air terminals. This system of air transportation effectively forced most airlines to be "regional" in nature, but the lack of distinction among carriers soon began to change with the 1929 launch of Transcontinental Air Transport (T-A-T) in the United States. T-A-T's transcontinental "Lindbergh Line" became America's first contiguous coast-to-coast air service, and it ushered in a new era of major airlines expanding to operate networks with large footprints. The development of long-range aircraft operated by flag carriers like British Overseas Airways Corporation and Trans-Canada Airlines further normalized the capability of "far and wide" air travel among the traveling public.

=== Shifting definition ===
"Regional airline" is a flexible term whose meaning has changed substantially over time. What it means today is different than how it has been used in the past. For instance, in the United States, around 1960, the term “regional carrier” denoted the smaller eight of the 12 largest carriers, then known as trunk carriers (or trunk airlines or simply trunks). At the time the four biggest airlines in the United States were known as the Big Four, comprising American, United, TWA and Eastern Air Lines. The other eight trunk carriers were Braniff, Capital, Continental, Delta, National, Northeast, Northwest and Western. Since, at the time, none of these eight had a network approaching the scale of the Big Four, they were known as the regional carriers. This was despite the existence, at the time, of 13 smaller United States scheduled carriers known as local service carriers whose service was arguably far more regional than the “regional” trunks.

So when reading historical sources, it is important to understand that the term "regional airline" has migrated greatly over time. Sometimes the term has been stretched beyond the point of utility. For instance, in a 1983 article about PBA, Provincetown-Boston Airlines, both Air New England and Air Florida are described as regional airlines. At the time, Air New England was a recently failed turboprop operator in the northeast US, while Air Florida was a jet carrier flying from Florida to the northeast, to Latin America and Europe. The two airlines had little in common.

=== Early growth ===
As flag carriers grew to fill the demand of long-range passenger traffic, new and small airlines found niches flying between short and underserved routes to and from major airports and more rural destinations. Through the 1960s and 1970s, war surplus designs (notably, the Douglas DC-3) were replaced by higher-performance turboprop or jet-powered designs like the Fokker F27 Friendship and BAC One-Eleven. This extended the range of the regionals dramatically, causing a wave of consolidations between the now overlapping airlines.

In the United States, regional airlines were an important building block of today's passenger air system. The U.S. Government encouraged the forming of regional airlines to provide services from smaller communities to larger towns, where air passengers could connect to a larger network.

The original regional airlines (then known as "Local service carriers") sanctioned by the Civil Aeronautics Board from 1943 to 1950 include:

- Allegheny Airlines
- Arizona Airways
- Bonanza Air Lines
- Central Airlines
- Challenger Airlines
- Empire Air Lines
- Florida Airways
- Lake Central Airlines
- Mid-West Airlines
- Mohawk Airlines
- Monarch Air Lines (merged with Arizona and Challenger to create Frontier in 1950)
- North Central Airlines
- Ozark Airlines
- Parks Air Lines
- Piedmont Airlines
- Pioneer Air Lines
- Southern Airways
- Southwest Airways (renamed Pacific Air Lines in 1958)
- Trans-Texas Airways
- West Coast Airlines
- Wiggins Airways

A history and study of regional airlines was published by the Smithsonian Institution Press in 1994 under the title Commuter Airlines of the United States, by R.E.G. Davies and I. E. Quastler.

=== Deregulation era ===
Since the Airline Deregulation Act of 1978, the US federal government has continued support of the regional airline sector to ensure many of the smaller and more isolated rural communities remain connected to air services. This is encouraged with the Essential Air Service program that subsidizes airline service to smaller U.S. communities and suburban centers, aiming to maintain year-round service.

Although regional airlines in the United States are often viewed as small, not particularly lucrative "no name" subsidiaries of the mainline airlines, in terms of revenue, many would be designated major airline carrier status based on the only actual definition of "major airline," in the United States, the definition from the U.S. Department of Transportation. This definition is based solely on annual revenue and not on any other criterion such as average aircraft seating capacity, pilot pay, or number of aircraft in the fleet. It is common in the U.S. to incorrectly associate aircraft size with the Department of Transportation's designation of major, national, and regional airline. The only corollary is the Regional Airline Association, an industry trade group, defines "regional airlines" generally as "...operat(ing) short and medium haul scheduled airline service connecting smaller communities with larger cities and connecting hubs. The airlines' fleet primarily consists of 19 to 68 seat turboprops and 30 to 100 seat regional jets." To be clear there is no distinction in the Department of Transportation definition of major, national and regional airlines by aircraft size. The definition is based on revenue. The clash of definitions has led to confusion in the media and the public.

=== 1990s–2000s ===
Beginning around 1985, a number of trends have become apparent. Regional aircraft are getting larger, faster, and are flying longer ranges. Additionally, the vast majority of regionals within the United States with more than ten aircraft within their fleet, have lost their individual identities and now serve only as feeders, to Alaska Airlines, American Airlines, Delta Air Lines, or United Airlines major hubs. Regional aircraft in the US have been getting slightly more comfortable with the addition of better ergonomically designed aircraft cabins, and the addition of varying travel classes aboard these aircraft. From small, less than 50-seat "single-class cabin" turboprop, to turbofan regional jet equipment, present day regional airlines provide aircraft such as the higher capacity CRJ700, CRJ900, CRJ1000 series of aircraft and the somewhat larger fuselage Embraer E-Jets. Some of these newer aircraft are capable of flying longer distances with comfort levels that rival and surpass the regional airline equipment of the past.

In the early 1990s, much more advanced turboprop-powered, fuel efficient, and passenger friendly DC-3 type replacement projects such as the 19 passenger Embraer/FMA CBA 123 Vector and the 34 seat Dornier 328 were undertaken, but met little financial success, partly due to economic downturn in the airline industry resulting from the outbreak of hostilities when Iraq invaded Kuwait. Many of the regional airlines operating turboprop equipment such as Delta's regional sister Comair airlines in the United States set the course for bypassing entirely the regional turboprops as they became the first to transition to an all-jet regional jet fleet. To a lesser extent in Europe and the United Kingdom this transition, to notably the Embraer or Canadair designs, was well advanced by the late 1990s. This evolution towards jet equipment, brought the independent regional airlines into direct competition with the major airlines, forcing additional consolidation.

To improve on their market penetration, larger airline holding companies rely on operators of smaller aircraft to provide service or added frequency service to some airports. Such airlines, often operating in code-share arrangements with mainline airlines, often completely repaint their aircraft fleet in the mainline airline's sub-brand livery. For example, United Express regional airline partner CommutAir branded its entire fleet as United Express. On the other hand, regional airline Gulfstream International Airlines did not brand their aircraft. When Colgan Air was still operating, they branded a handful of aircraft as Colgan Air, but most were branded as Continental Connection, US Airways Express or United Express, with whom it had contractual agreements.

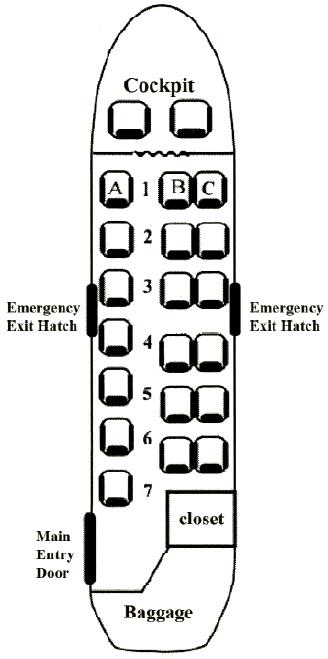
Typical seat map of a smaller regional airliner as is often flown by the regional airlines. The smallest aircraft flown under such brands and regional airlines may or may not have lavatories.

== Business model ==
21st century regional airlines are commonly organized in one of two ways.

=== Independent model ===
Operating as an independent airline under their own brand, mostly providing service to small and isolated towns, for whom the airline is the only reasonable link to a larger town. Examples of this are PenAir, which links the remote Aleutian Islands to Anchorage, Alaska, and Mokulele Airlines, which operates in the Hawaiian islands.

=== Fee-for-departure (contract) model ===
As an affiliated airline, contracting with a major airline, operating under their brand name (for example, Endeavor Air operates flights under the Delta Connection brand name for Delta Air Lines), and filling two roles: delivering passengers to the major airline's hubs from surrounding towns, and increasing frequency of service on mainline routes during times when demand does not warrant use of large aircraft, known as commuter flights.

One of the first independently owned and managed airlines in the world that rebranded its aircraft to match a larger airline's brand was Air Alpes of France. During 1974, Air Alpes painted its newly delivered short range regional jets in the livery of Air France.

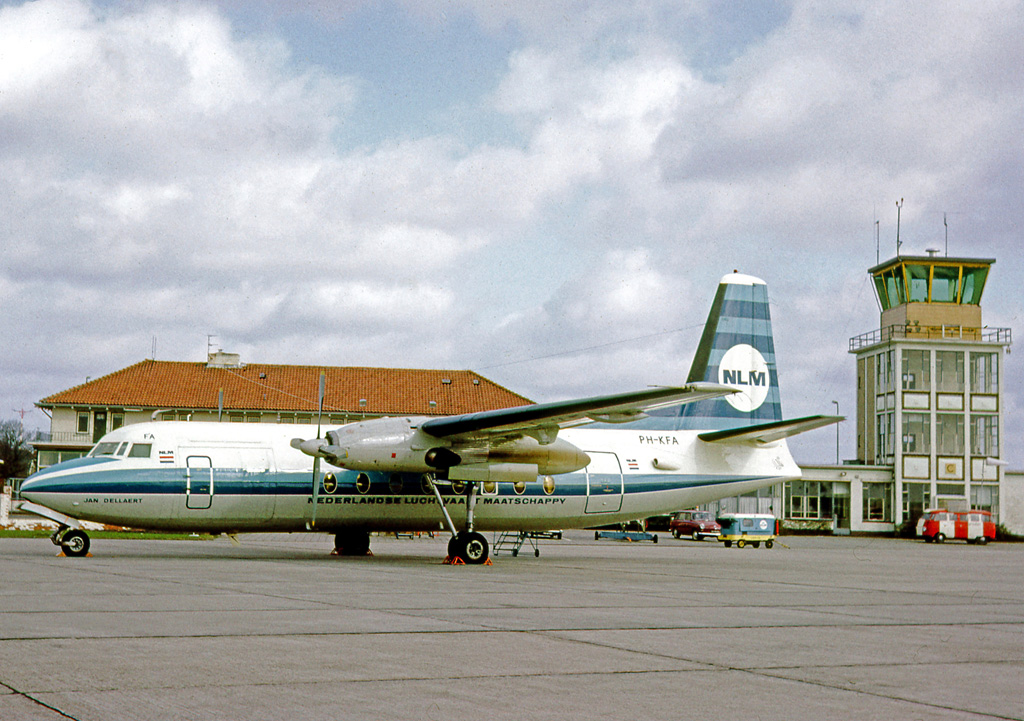
NLM Fokker F.27 Friendship wearing the basic mainline livery of KLM Airlines however wearing the initial titles of NLM at Groningen in 1967. NLM was a KLM subsidiary and later became KLM Cityhopper

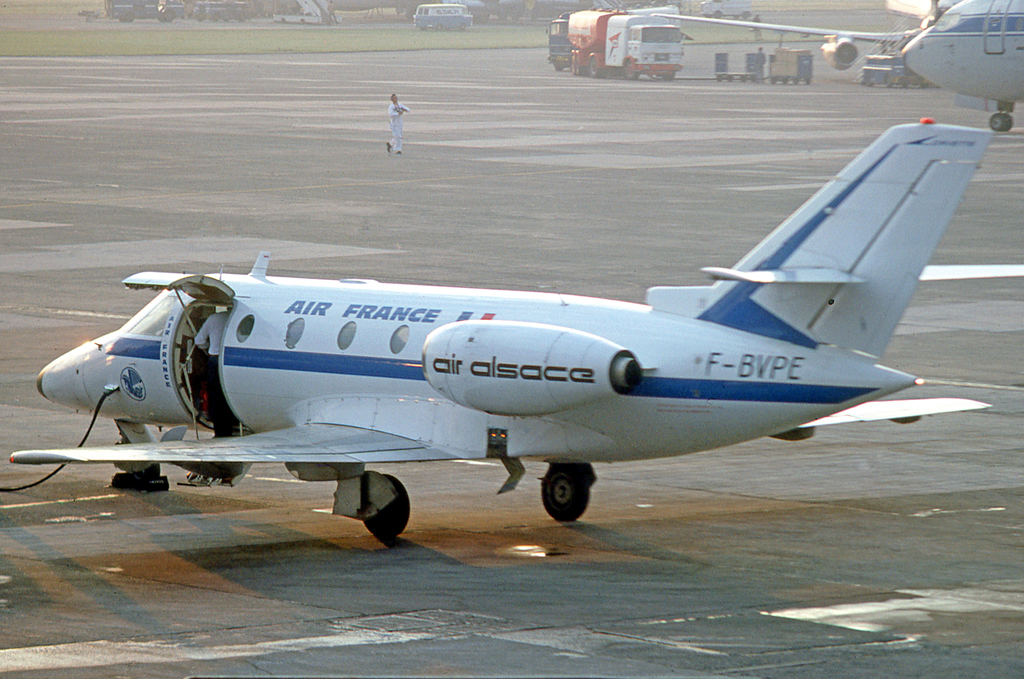
An Aerospatiale Corvette of Air Alsace at Brussels Airport in 1977. Much like Air Alpes, these aircraft fed regional and higher yielding traffic to Air France and were also one of the first companies to adopt the now common practice of taking on the branding of the larger airline, namely Air France; who they operated in association with

NLM's KLM style branding does however pre-date the Air France efforts though by a number of years.

The success of the "rebranding" or "pseudo branding" of a much smaller airline into the name recognition of a much larger one soon became clear as passenger numbers soared at Air Alpes, and it was soon decided to paint other aircraft such as the Fokker F-27 into full Air France colours as well.

Sub-branding is mostly consistent throughout the airline industry of the United States, with all the regional airlines, mainline airlines, and the regional airline holding companies, as well as the mainline airlines holding companies participating.

== Industry ==
=== Labor relations ===
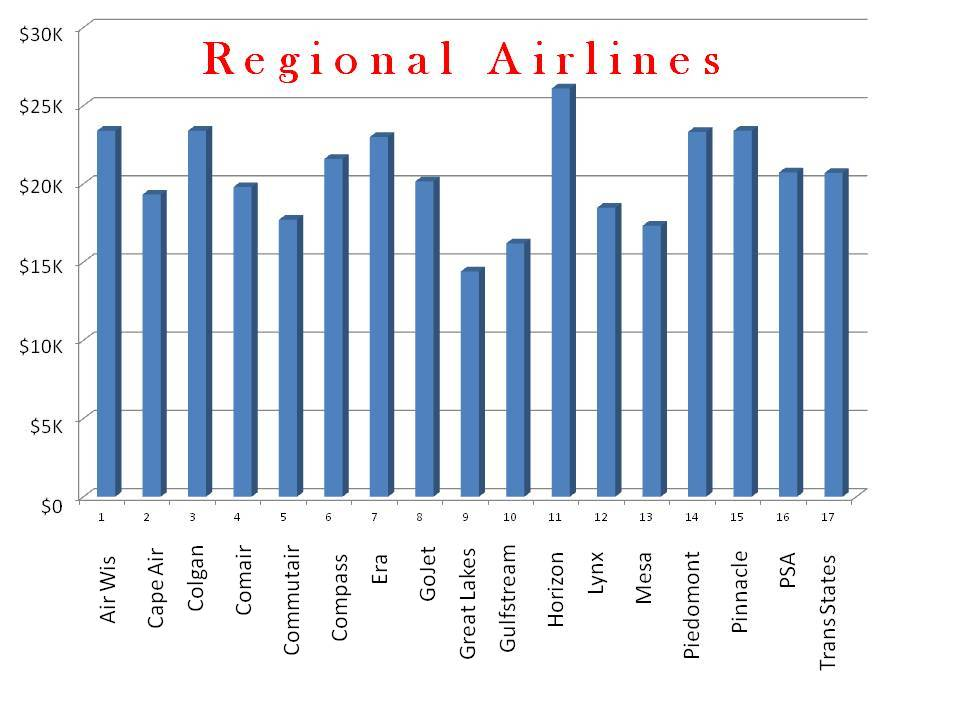
First year regional pilot pay as of August 2011

On February 12, 2010, a year after the crash of Colgan Air Flight 3407, Frontline premiered its WGA Award-winning exposé on the industry entitled "Flying Cheap". In the program, reporter Miles O'Brien questioned how the impact of low salaries are having on pilot psyches and how safe this could be for the flying public. When asked to respond to the question, Roger Cohen, president of the Regional Airline Association, told Frontline that, "...there are many other people who earn less money than that and work more days in these communities that can afford it and do it and do it responsibly."

=== Future ===
The Small Aircraft Transportation System outlined a new vision for regional mobility, based on services built out of small general aviation aircraft and VLJs (very light jets) with advanced automation. This vision failed to materialize due to its primary focus on rural mobility and a lack of clear and viable business case.

With the introduction of air taxi services and very light jets, city pair links to smaller communities lacking regional connections could become more common. This opportunities could become commercially viable with advanced air mobility and the introduction of electric aircraft.

In some parts of the world, regional airlines face competition from high-speed rail and also coach (bus) services with airlines sometimes replacing feeder services through air rail alliances and contracts with bus companies (e.g., Landline between Philadelphia International Airport and Atlantic City International Airport).

== Current regional airline brands ==
- Aer Lingus Regional
- Aeromexico Connect
- Air Canada Express
- Air Europa Express
- Air France Hop
- Alaska Horizon
- Alaska SkyWest
- Alliance Air
- American Eagle
- ANA Wings
- Azul Conecta
- BA CityFlyer
- Cayman Airways Express
- Delta Connection
- Fiji Link
- Iberia Regional
- J-Air
- KLM Cityhopper
- Lufthansa City Airlines
- Moçambique Expresso
- PAL Express
- RusLine
- QantasLink
- Star Air (India)
- TAP Express
- Tunisair Express
- United Express
- Virgin Australia Regional Airlines
- WestJet Encore
- Bangkok Airways
- Vietravel Airlines
- China Express Airlines
- Royal Air Maroc Express

== Current regional airlines ==
=== North America ===
In North America, regional airlines are operated primarily to bring passengers to the major hubs, where they will connect for longer-distance flights on the national airlines also known as flagship carriers. The smallest regional carriers have become known as feeder airlines. The separate corporate structure allows the company to operate under different pay schedules, typically paying much less than their mainline owners.

Many large North American airlines, have established operational relationships with one or more regional airline companies. Their aircraft often use the aircraft livery for the company they are operating flights for. These airlines can be subsidiaries of the major airline or fly under a code sharing agreement or operating through capacity purchase agreements, with the mainline parent company financing the aircraft for the regional airline, and then placing the aircraft with the regional for very little cost. An example would be Envoy Air, which is fully owned by American Airlines Group and does business as American Eagle.

Many of these large regional airlines have joined the lobbying group Regional Airline Association. This association lobbies purely for the financial interest of the corporate bodies it constitutes, not the employees of those airlines.

==== Canada ====
In Canada there are a number of regional airlines. Some of them focus on Canadian Arctic and First Nations communities, while others operate regional flights on behalf of a larger carrier, similar to their American counterparts. Some of these airlines and brands include:

- Air Canada Express operated by Jazz
- Air Creebec
- Air Tindi
- Bearskin Airlines
- Canadian North
- Pacific Coastal Airlines
- Pascan Aviation
- Perimeter Aviation
- Wasaya Airways
- WestJet Encore (operating for WestJet)

==== United States ====
The trend of branding regional airlines to match the mainline airlines, has led to just three major sub-brands in the United States: American Eagle, Delta Connection and United Express. They are the post-deregulation survivors of the multiple bankruptcies and mergers of the major, legacy, mainline airlines.

These regional brands are a form of a virtual airline, with the regional airline paid to staff, operate and maintain aircraft used on flights that are scheduled, marketed and sold by a partner mainline airline. This practice allows the mainline carrier to use outsourced labor at smaller stations, to reduce costs. In 2011, 61% of all advertised flights for American, Delta, United and US Airways were operated by their regional brands. This figure was only 40% in 2000.

===== Regional airlines =====
The formerly small regional airlines have grown substantially, through mergers or by the use of a holding company, as pioneered by AMR Corporation in 1982. AMR created the AMR Eagle Holding Corporation which unified its wholly owned American Eagle Airlines and Executive Airlines under one division, but still maintained the regional airlines' operating certificates and personnel separate from each other and American Airlines.

The most significant regional airlines in the United States, are:

Mainline carrier-owned

- Alaska Air Group
  - Horizon Air
- American Airlines Group
  - Envoy Air
  - Piedmont Airlines
  - PSA Airlines
- Delta Air Lines
  - Endeavor Air

Independent contractors

- Air Wisconsin (American Airlines contract ended April 3, 2025)
- CommuteAir
- GoJet Airlines
- Mesa Airlines
- Republic Airways
- SkyWest Airlines

===== Smaller commuter airlines =====
The evolution and chronological history of the commuter side of the regional airline industry can be defined by a number of dates prior to the end of the era of airline regulation by the Civil Aeronautics Board of the United States. Among these significant dates are:

1967 – CAB makes exemption for airlines, starting with the local service carrier Allegheny Airlines; to suspend operating a route with large aircraft due to a lack of passenger traffic to do so profitably, provided the airline operating the CAB awarded route substitutes its operation with other equipment and maintains responsibility the route is served. As such this "exemption" allowed the development of the Allegheny Commuter System and the subcontracting of Henson Airlines to fulfill Allegheny's CAB route award obligations.
1969 and before – aircraft falling below the weight of 12,500 pounds (5.7 t) were considered small aircraft and thus, not subject to the certification requirements of the CAB.
1969 and after – the CAB officially defined airlines with aircraft of no more than 12,500 pounds (5.7 t) of maximum gross weight as commuter airlines
1972 – relaxations of the CAB regulations permitted commuter aircraft to carry 30 passengers and a payload of 7,500 pounds (3.4 t).
1977 – Official list of U.S. Commuter Airlines in the year prior to airline deregulation
1978 – during the sunset of the CAB regulation the size of commuters were permitted to grow to 60 passengers and 18,000 pounds (8.2 t) of freight.
1978 and onwards the airline industry was officially deregulated by the Airline Deregulation Act of 1978
1981 – the United States governmental lobbying body of this industry, known as the Commuter Airline Association, changes its name to the Regional Airline Association.

List of Commuter Airlines in 1977 Prior to Airline Deregulation:

- Air Carolina
- Air Midwest
- Air New England
- Air Wisconsin
- Alaska Aeronautical
- Altair Airlines
- Antilles Air Boats
- Atlantic City Airlines
- Bar Harbor Airlines
- Cascade Airways
- Cochise Airlines
- Cumberland Airlines
- Execuair Airlines
- Florida Airlines
- Golden West Airlines
- Metro Airlines
- Midstate Airlines
- New England Airlines
- Pilgrim Airlines
- Puerto Rico International Airlines
- Rio Airways
- Rocky Mountain Airways
- Royal Hawaiian Airways
- Scenic Airlines
- Seaplane Shuttle
- Sky West Aviation
- SMB Stagelines
- Swift Aire Lines
- Suburban Airlines
- Transport Catalina Airlines
- Tyee Airlines
- Zia Airlines

Some of the lesser known smaller brands used by the regional airlines and their parent companies were:

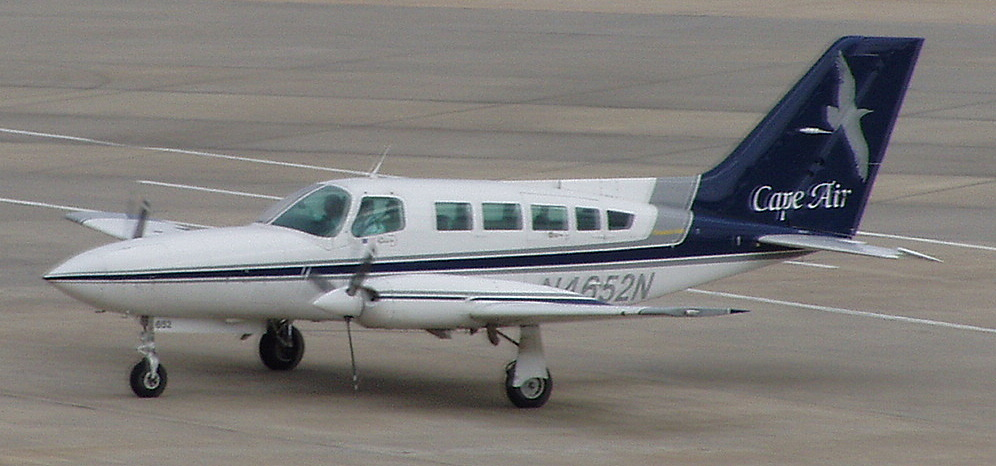
Cessna 402C of Hyannis Air Service – Cape Air

- PWExpress, a regional airline brand of the regional airline named Pacific Wings, IATA code (LW) which is owned by Pacific Air Holdings company
- New Mexico Airlines, a regional airline brand of Pacific Wings, which is owned by Pacific Air Holdings company
- Nantucket Airlines, a brand operated by regional airline Cape Air which is wholly owned by the regional airline holding company Hyannis Air Service.
- Ravn Connect, a commuter /air taxi brand operated by the regional airlines owned by the HoTH parent company in association with Corvus Airlines which operates under the Ravn Alaska marketing brand and is also owned by HoTH.

=== Europe ===
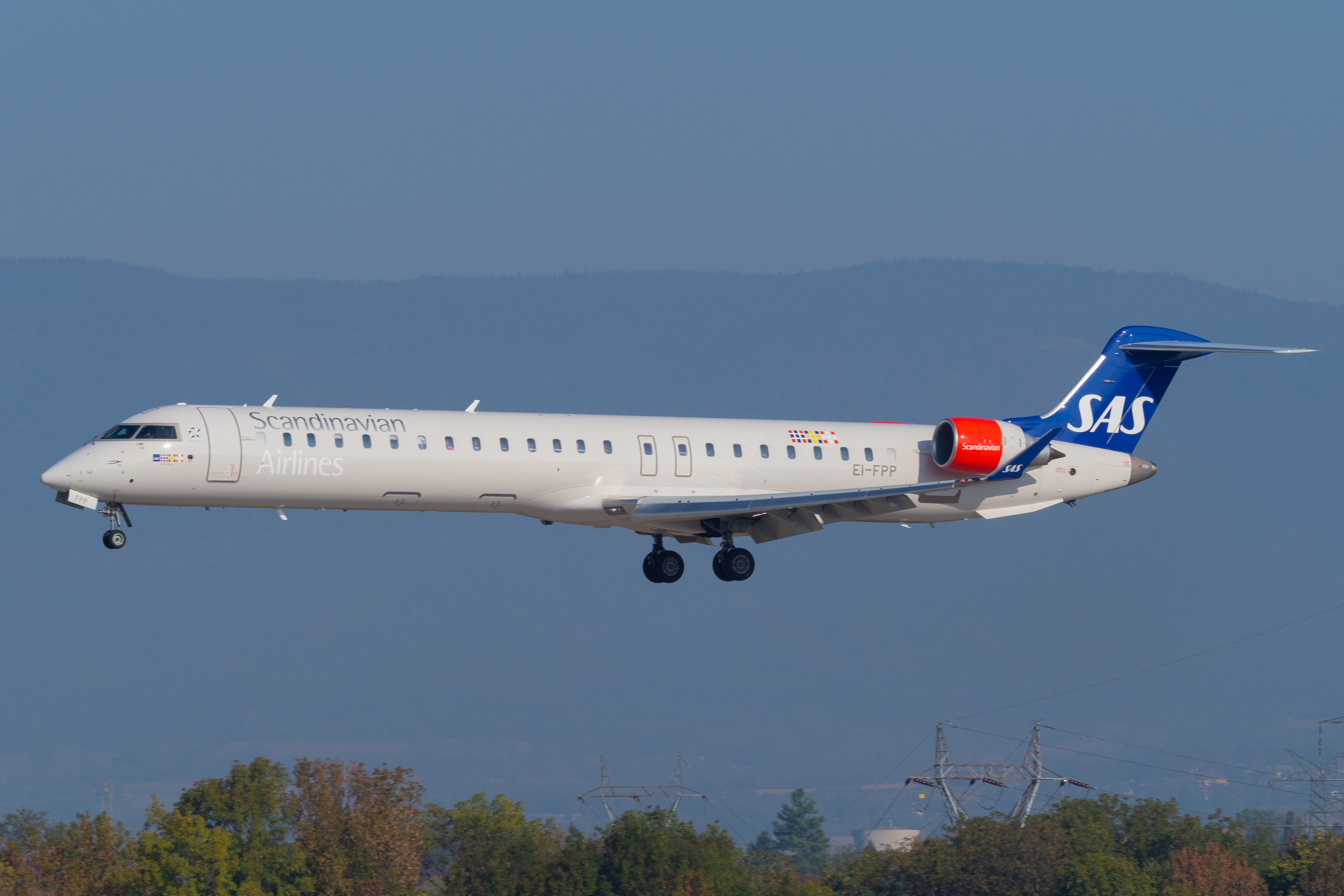
CityJet is a European regional airline operating wet leased aircraft for of larger airlines. Like this CRJ900 operated for Scandinavian Airlines.

European regional airlines serve the intra-continental sector in Europe. They connect cities to major airports and to other cities, avoiding the need for passengers to make transfers.

For example, BA CityFlyer a regional subsidiary of British Airways uses the basic Chatham Dockyard Union Flag livery of its parent company and flies between domestic and European cities.

Some of Europe's regional airlines are subsidiaries of national air carriers, though there remains a strong entrepreneurial sector of independents. They are based on business models ranging from the traditional full service airline to low cost carriers. Innovations include one where the passenger is required to join a membership club before being allowed to fly.

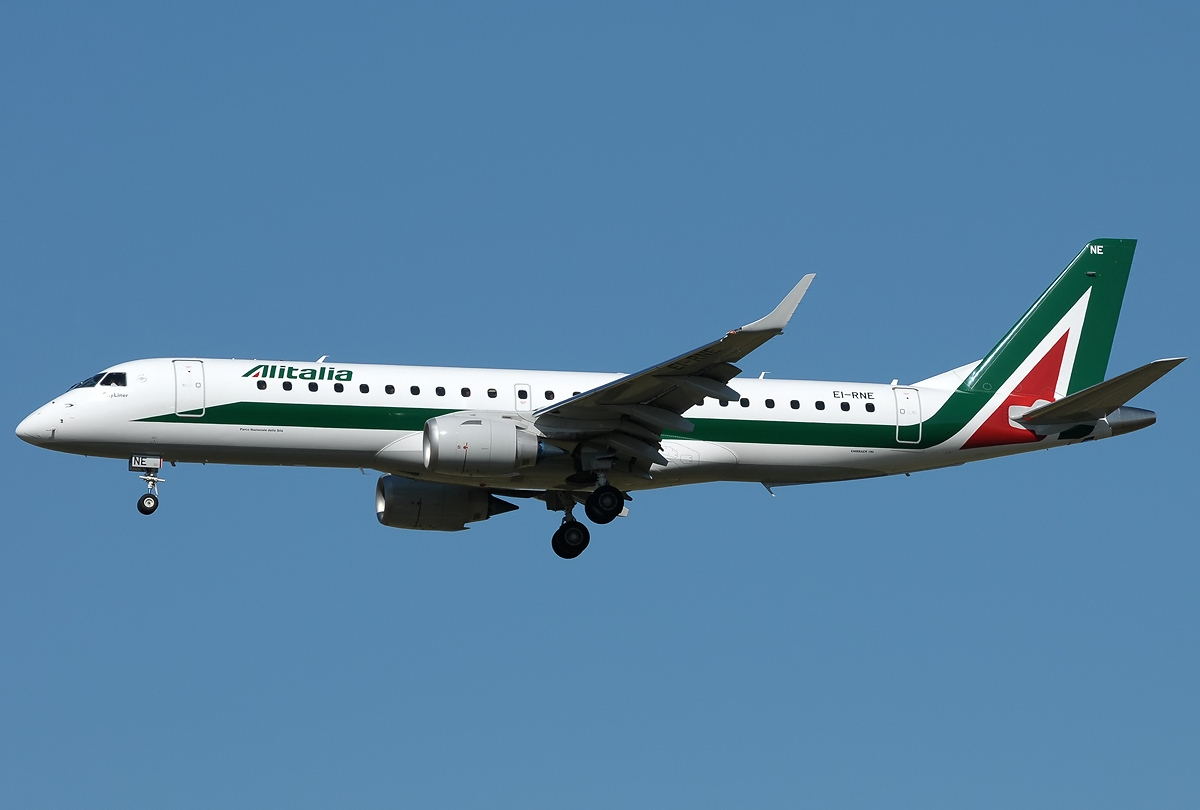
An Embraer E195 of Alitalia CityLiner.

Some examples of European regional airlines include:

- Air Dolomiti
- Air France Hop
- Air Nostrum
- Alitalia CityLiner
- Aurigny
- BA CityFlyer
- Blue Islands
- CityJet
- Eastern Airways
- KLM Cityhopper
- Loganair
- Lufthansa CityLine
- TAP Express
- Twin Jet

=== Asia ===
India

India has many regional carriers operating currently. Some of these operate under the government's UDAN (Regional Connectivity Scheme).

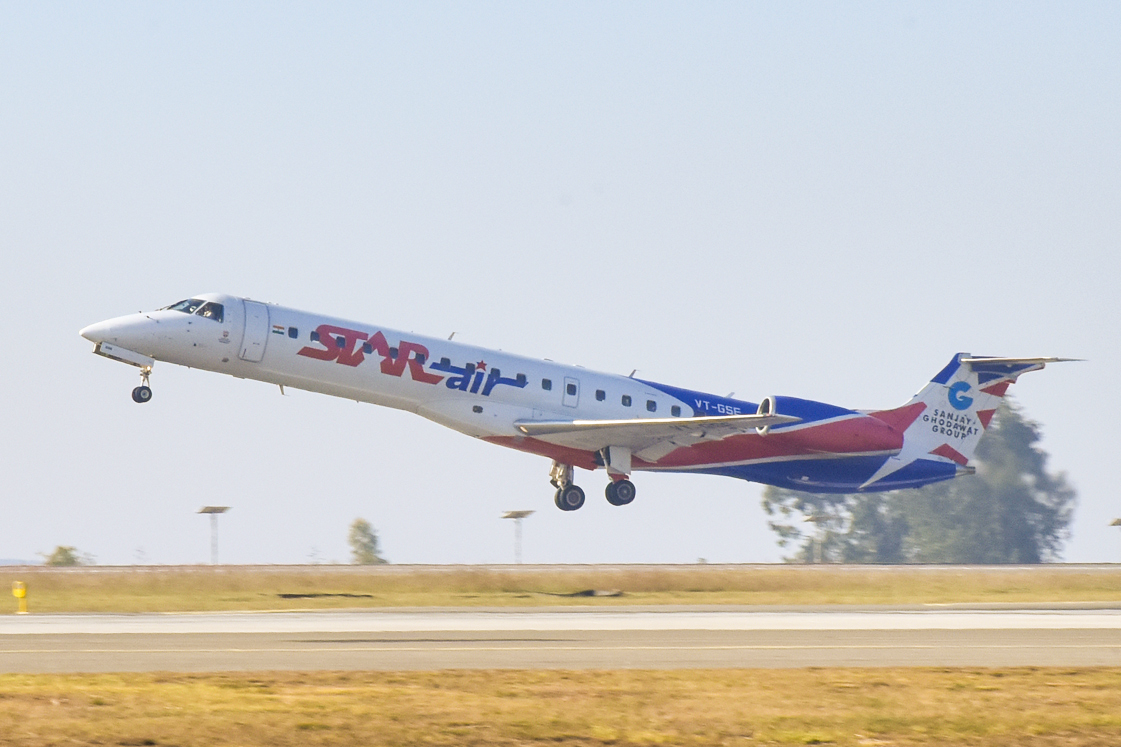
Star Air ERJ-145LR departing Kempegowda International Airport

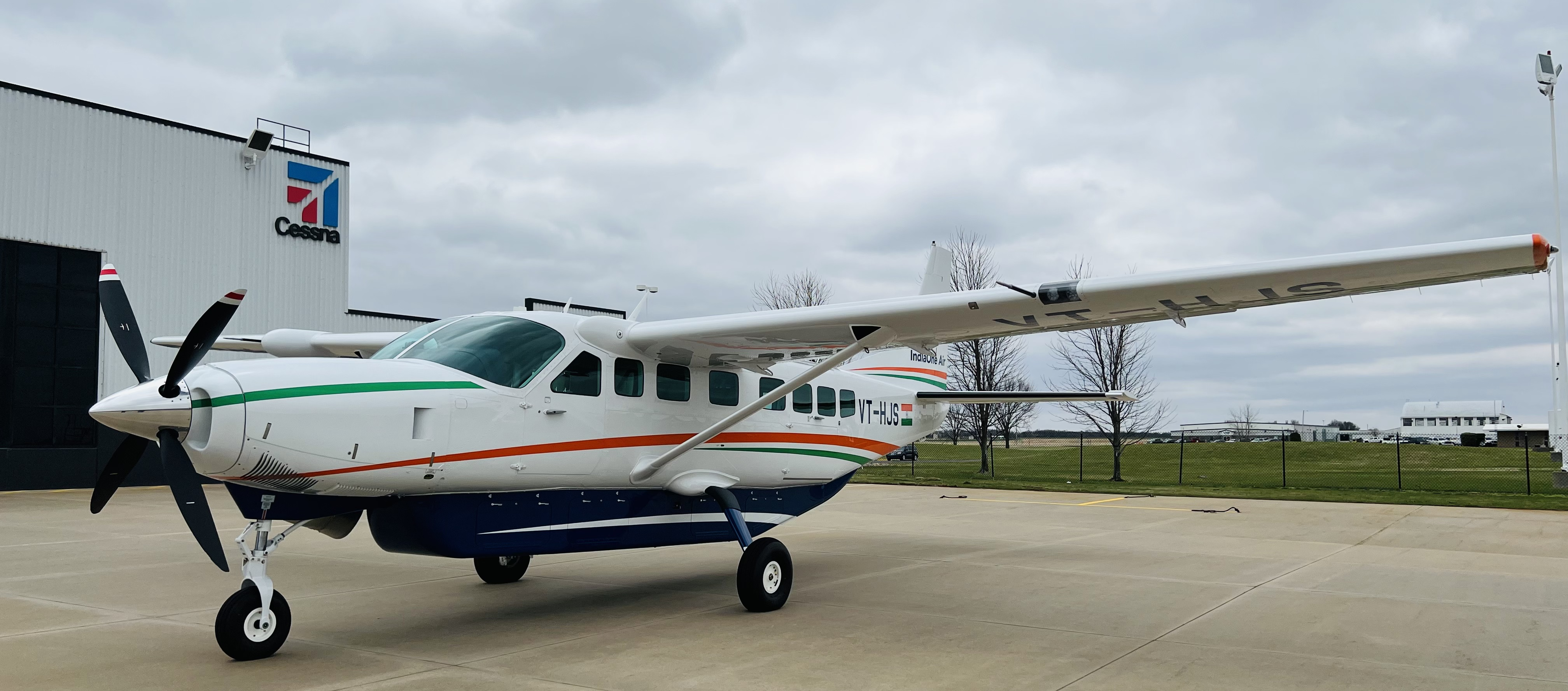
IndiaOne Air aircraft at Textron Aviation facility in Independence.

- Alliance Air, a former subsidiary of India's former state-owned flag carrier, Air India.

Note:- Alliance Air is still a state-owned airline, whereas Air India is private.

- Star Air
- FlyBig
- IndiaOne Air

Malaysia

AirBorneo, formerly MASWings, operates subsidized Rural Air Services to remote communities across East Malaysia under a Public Service Obligation (PSO) framework, continuing services previously provided by MASwings. Originally a subsidiary of Malaysian Airlines (MAS), the airline is now fully owned by the Government of Sarawak.

Thailand

- Bangkok Airways has won World's Best Regional Airline from Skytrax three years in a row in 2015, 2016 and 2017
- Thai Smile

Japan

Japanese regional airlines operate flights between regional cities and major metropolitan areas, as well as between regional cities. Some specialise in serving remote island destinations. While certain regional airlines are subsidiaries of major carriers such as Japan Airlines and All Nippon Airways, others operate independently.

- All Nippon Airways affiliates
  - ANA Wings
- Japan Airlines affiliates
  - J-Air
  - Japan Air Commuter
  - Japan Transocean Air
  - Ryukyu Air Commuter
  - Hokkaido Air System
- Fuji Dream Airlines

Singapore

SilkAir, originally founded in 1989 as Tradewinds, operated as the regional wing of Singapore Airlines. Singapore Airlines' fleet consisted entirely of large twin-aisle aircraft, while SilkAir operated single-aisle aircraft. SilkAir was merged back into Singapore Airlines in 2021.

=== Australia ===
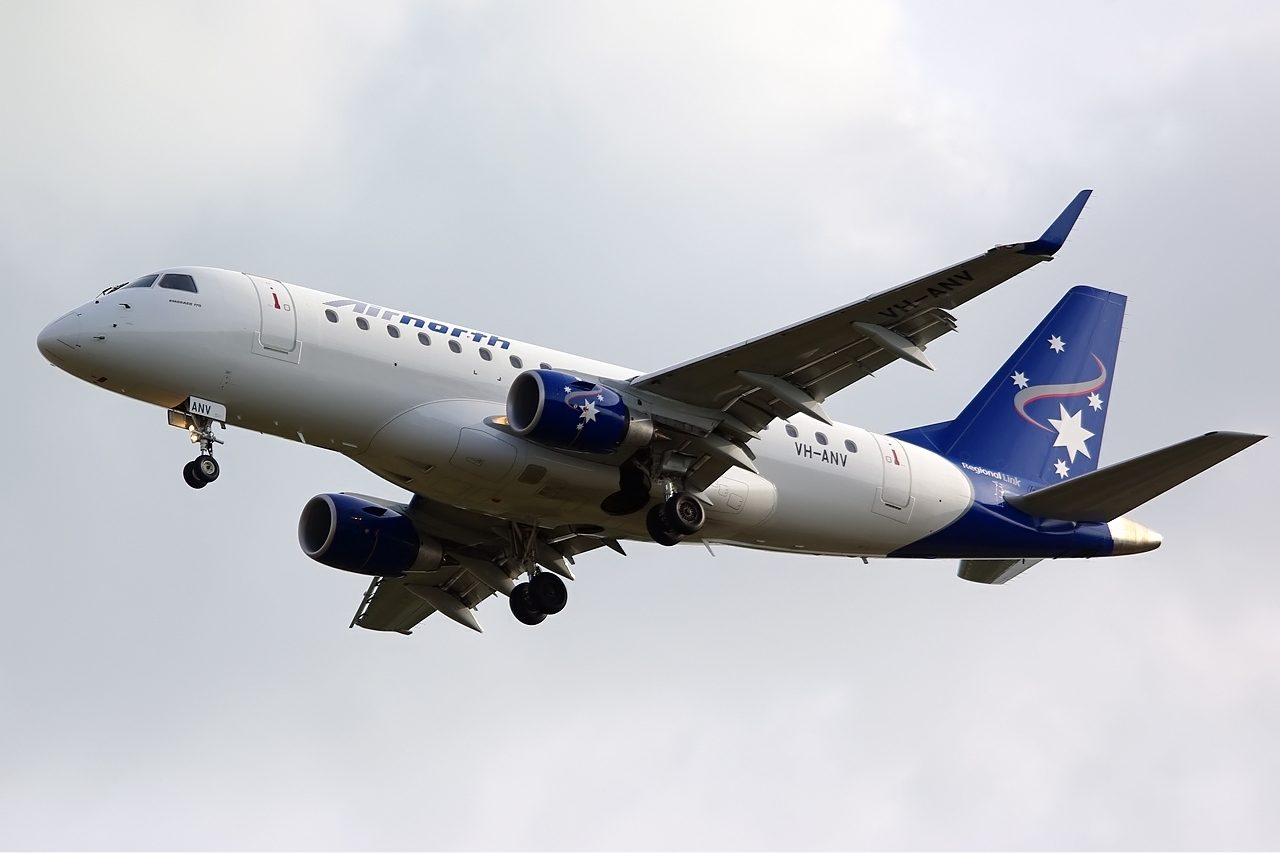
Embraer 170-100LR of Airnorth at Darwin Airport in 2010

Australia has an association for regional airline, the Regional Aviation of Australia. More than 2 million passengers and 23 million kg of cargo are involved each year.

- Airnorth
- Alliance Airlines
- FlyPelican
- Fly Tiwi
- King Island Airlines
- Par Avion
- QantasLink, the regional arm of Qantas
- Rex Airlines, the largest regional airline outside of Qantas, servicing routes in several states and territories.
- Sharp Airlines
- Skytrans Airlines
- Virgin Australia Regional Airlines

== Former regional airlines ==
Post airline deregulation, airlines sought added market share and to do this they sought partnerships with regional and small airlines to feed traffic into the airline hub.

Initially these tie ups tended to use small 15 -19 seat aircraft, which did not have a reputation of passenger comfort, or safe reliable operations, by small often under capitalized tiny airline operators.

To create a common tie and what appeared to be seamless to the air traveler, major carriers marketed in advertising and soon had much smaller airlines paint their small and what was often described as puddle-jumper aircraft, in the image and branding colors of the much larger mainline partner. This was to give the appearance of reliability. Over time these regional aircraft grew in size as airline hubs expanded and competition dwindled among the major carriers.

Below is a list of many of the regional brands that evolved when regional airlines were advertised to look like the major airlines.

=== Marketing brands with regional-type aircraft ===
The following is a list of former regional marketing brands operated by lesser known airlines, serving airline hub regional routes on behalf of mainline, legacy, major, or large discount carriers in the United States:

- Air Florida Commuter
- AirTran JetConnect
- Allegheny Commuter
- Aloha Island Air
- America West Express
- American Inter-Island
- AmericanConnection
- ATA Connection
- Braniff Express
- Continental Connection
- Continental Express
- Eastern Atlantis Express
- Eastern Express ops by (AJC) (AMD) (PBA) (PRE)
- Eastern Metro Express
- Frontier Commuter (Combs Airways – ITR Airlines)
- Frontier Express
- Frontier JetExpress
- Grand Connection (Alpha Air)
- MarkAir Express
- Midway Connection
- Midwest Connect
- New York Air Connection
- Northwest Airlink
- Ozark Midwest
- Pan Am Express (an airline formerly known as Ransome Airlines, acquired by Pan Am in 1987)
- Piedmont Commuter
- Reno Air Express
- Republic Express ops by (9E) (XJ) (MQ)
- Trans World Express
- TranStar Sky Link
- TW Express (TWE)
- TWA Connection
- US Airways Express, being replaced by American Eagle as US Airways merges with American Airlines
- Western Express (OO)

=== Marketing brands with mainline branding / mainline-type aircraft but operated by regional airlines ===
The following is a list of former marketing brands operated by smaller airlines, but using larger traditionally non-regional-type equipment such as the Boeing 727, Douglas DC9, Fokker F28, Embraer 190 E-jets, or BAE 146, serving airline hub regional routes on behalf of mainline, legacy, major, or large discount carriers, in the United States:

- Continental Airlines operated by Royale Airlines
- Continental Jet Express
- Continental's Houston Proud Express
- Frontier Airlines operated by Lynx Aviation
- Frontier Airlines operated by Republic Airlines
- Northwest Jet AirLink
- Midwest (ops by Republic Airlines even after Midwest Airlines is shuttered)
- Pan Am Clipper Connection (Boston-Maine Airways, a true regional airline within the Pan Am Systems airline and transportation conglomerate, tried to run a fully certificated mainline airline as nothing more than a distinct internal marketing brand of a regional airline.)
- Pan Am Express (1981–1991, consisting of several airlines contracted to operate regional flights on behalf of Pan Am)

== See also ==
- List of commercial short-haul civilian passenger "regional" airliners
- List of commercial short-haul civilian passenger "regional jet" airliners
