= Chicago Air =

American regional airline carrier

IATA	ICAO	Call sign
CH	CHGO	WildOnion
- Founded: 1985; 41 years ago
- Ceased operations: 1986; 40 years ago
- Hubs: Chicago Midway International Airport
- Frequent-flyer program: Midway Airlines
- Fleet size: 6
- Destinations: 10
- Headquarters: Chicago, Illinois
- Key people: Neal F. Meehan (CEO); J. Scott Christian (Exec. VP); Roy Spencer (VP, Flight Ops); Ed Kelleher (VP, Finance); Bruce Marcus (VP, Customer Service); Dave Rescino (Senior Dir., Accounting); Kathy Henkel (Director, Inflight Service)

Chicago Air was a regional airline carrier that operated in 1986 and exchanged passengers with all-jet Midway Airlines at Chicago Midway International Airport.

== History ==
The carrier operated revenue service from May to November, 1986 between Chicago and Madison, Green Bay, LaCrosse, Eau Claire, and Wausau, Wisconsin; Traverse City, Michigan; and, Peoria, Springfield and Quad Cities, Illinois. It operated six Fokker F27 turboprop aircraft, and the call sign was "Wild Onion" in reference to the Chippewa Indian derivation of the name "Chicago." The Fokker aircraft were subleased from Midstate Airlines of Stevens Point, Wisconsin, which also performed contract maintenance work on the aircraft at their Central Wisconsin Airport facility.

Chicago Air had been working closely for two years with Saab Aircraft of Linköping, Sweden to acquire initially 10 Saab SF-340 turboprop commuter aircraft, which would have begun delivery in 1987 enabling expansion of services to Des Moines, Cedar Rapids, and Waterloo, Iowa; South Bend, Ft. Wayne, Lafayette, and Evansville, Indiana; and Kalamazoo and Grand Rapids, Michigan. Chicago Air held a further option for 16 of the SF-340 aircraft, which would have enabled the carrier to expand services to additional markets in Michigan, Ohio, Missouri and Minnesota.

In addition to its low-fare cachet and connections at convenient Midway Airport, Chicago Air introduced several important service improvements to the regional airline industry, including quality complimentary meal service, premium regional beers, wine and cocktails, national and regional newspapers, and many other innovative ground and in-flight seating and amenities.

The introduction of non-refundable fares by all competitive carriers and dramatically increased competitive advertising and promotions during the 1986 summer season made the Chicago Air venture a short-lived enterprise. Midstate Airlines announced a takeover in October 1986. Chicago Air ceased service in November 1986, when Midstate Airlines discontinued the subleasing agreement with Chicago Air for Fokker F27 aircraft, as well as use of the maintenance facilities. Soon after, Midway Airlines launched the successful regional "Midway Connection" service operated by Fischer Brothers Aviation with the smaller Dornier 228.

The airline was led by Neal F. Meehan (President), former president of Continental Express Airlines and of New York Air; and by J. Scott Christian (Executive V.P.), a former senior manager at Continental Airlines; Booz Allen Hamilton; and New York Air. Meehan and Christian together controlled 50 percent of the carrier's voting stock, with the remaining shares held mostly by a small group of Chicago area investors.

== See also ==
- List of defunct airlines of the United States
