= Ransome Airlines =

American regional airline

IATA	ICAO	Call sign
AL(1970-1982) RZ(1982-1987) PL(1987-1991) RZ(1991-1995)	RAN(1982-1987) PNO(1987-1991) RBD(1991-1995)	ALLEGHENY(1970-1982) RANSOME(1982-1987) PAN EXPRESS(1987-1991) RED BIRD(1991-1995)
- Founded: 1967; 59 years ago
- Ceased operations: 1995; 31 years ago
- Operating bases: Northeast Philadelphia Airport
- Hubs: Berlin-Tegel (1987-1991, as Pan Am Express); New York-JFK (1987-1995, as Pan Am Express and Trans World Express); Miami International (1990-1991, as Pan Am Express); Pittsburgh International (1970-1982, as Allegheny Commuter)
- Parent company: Pan Am (1987–1991); TWA (1991–1995)
- Headquarters: Philadelphia, Pennsylvania
- Key people: J. Dawson Ransome (founder)

Ransome Airlines was a regional airline in the United States, headquartered at Northeast Philadelphia Airport in Philadelphia, Pennsylvania. Founded in 1967, it operated feeder flights on behalf of different mainline carriers via specific airline brands for most of its existence: as Allegheny Commuter (1970–1982), Delta Connection (1984–1987), Pan Am Express (1987–1991) and finally Trans World Express (1991–1995).

== History ==
=== Independent company ===
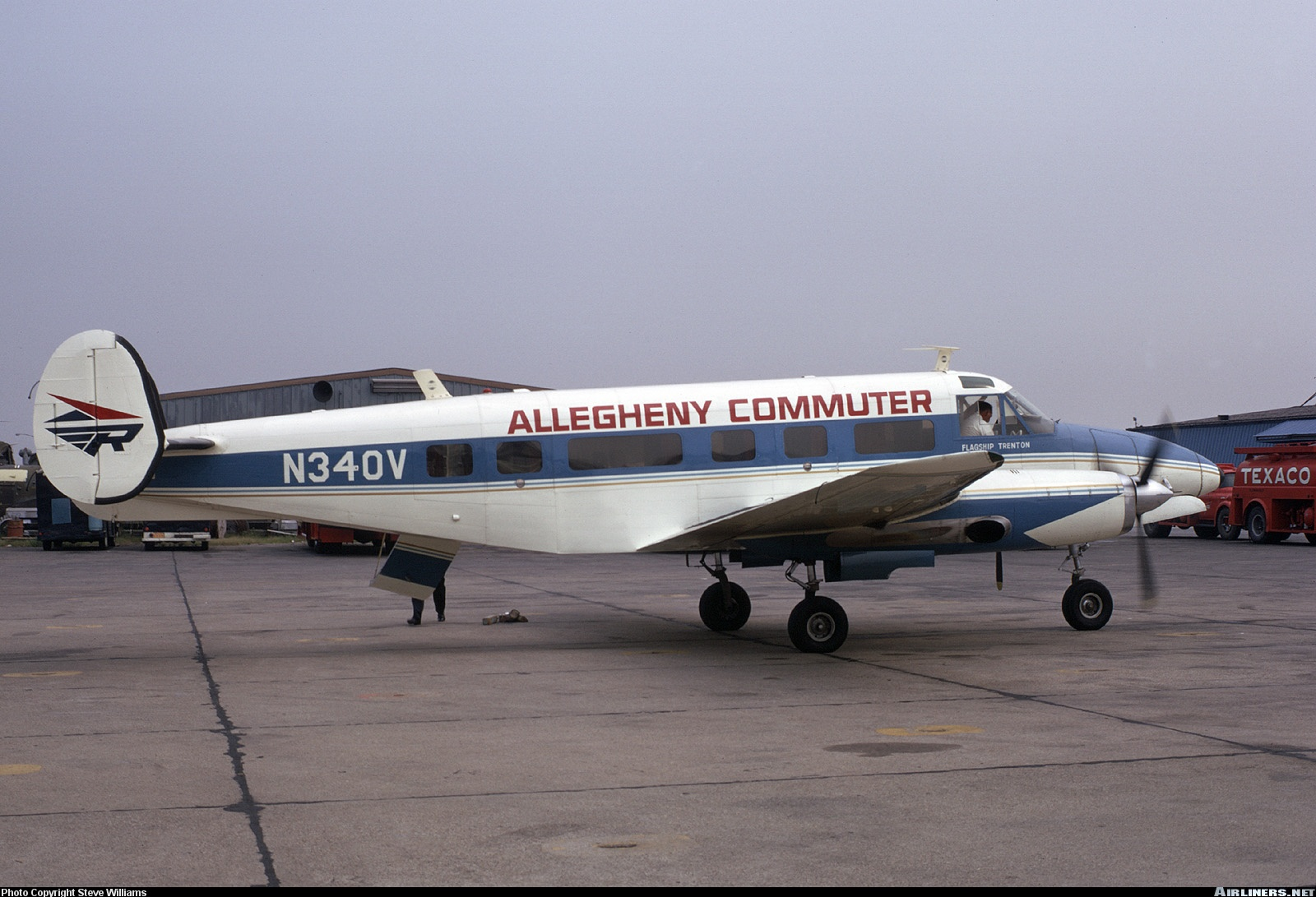
Beechcraft 18 (Volpar Turboliner I) in Allegheny Commuter colors.

The company was founded by J. Dawson Ransome in 1967, with the launch of revenue flights in March of that year. The initial network spanned along the East Coast from Philadelphia to Norfolk, and the fleet was composed of Volpar (Beechcraft) Model 18 11-seat airliners.

In August 1970, Ransome Airlines started one of its first branding partnerships with Allegheny Airlines, which would last until June 1, 1982. During that period, Ransome was branding its flights as Allegheny Commuter, feeding into Allegheny's hub at Pittsburgh International Airport, though the point-to-point network in the north-eastern United States was also kept. This airline co-operation is seen as one of the earliest examples for a codeshare agreement (Henson Airlines had been the first carrier to operate as "Allegheny Commuter" in 1967). Following the Airline Deregulation Act, Allegheny Airlines was renamed USAir in 1979. The Allegheny Commuter name was kept for some years, though, so that Ransome Airlines never operated as USAir Express.

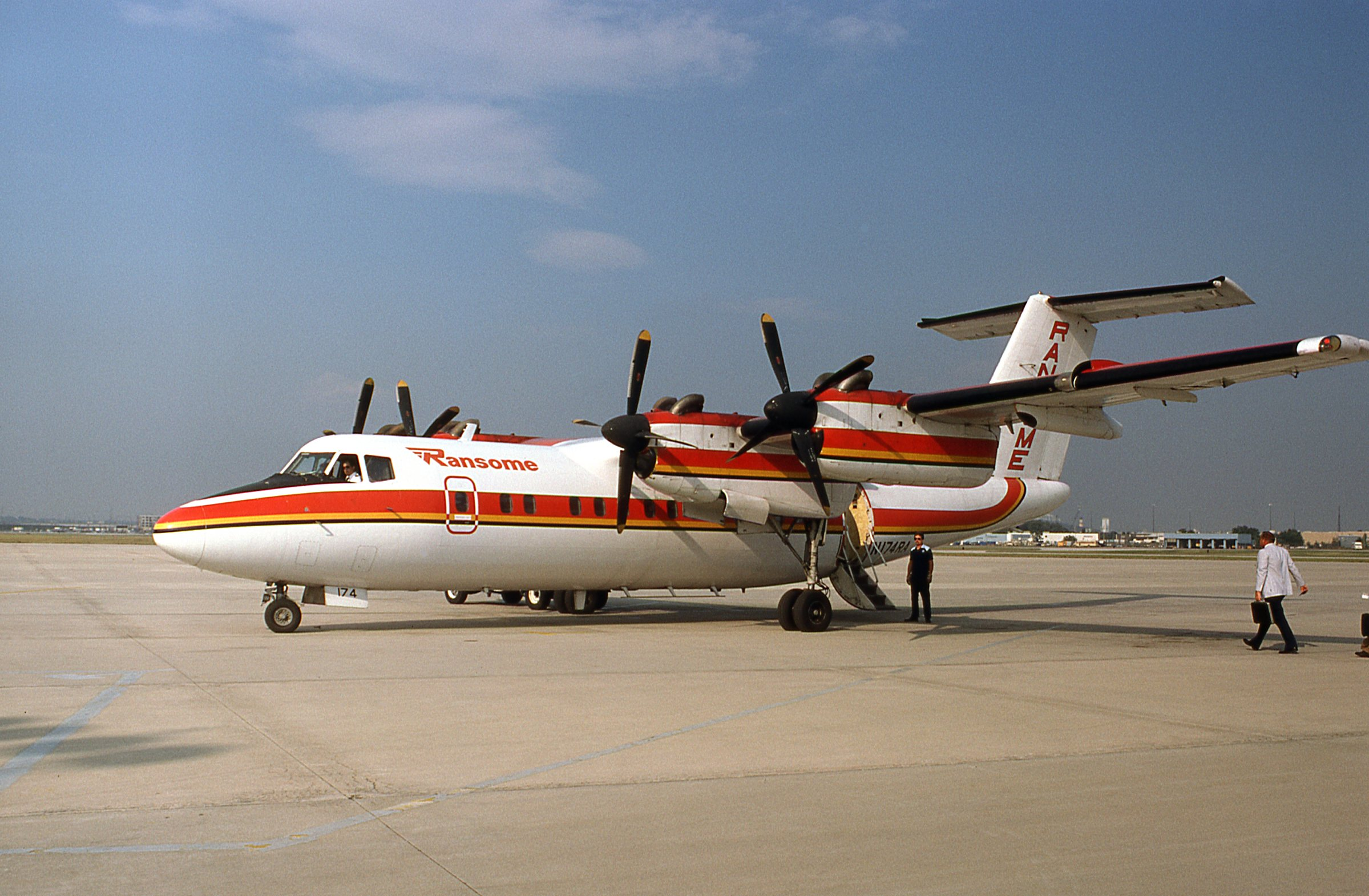
A DHC-7 at Philadelphia International Airport in 1984.

Between 1982 and 1984, Ransome returned to operating its point-to-point route network under its own brand name, which then spanned from Boston to Washington, D.C. In May 1984, Ransome entered into a partnership with Delta Air Lines, allowing its passengers to connect to/from Delta flights at Logan International Airport (Boston), Washington Dulles International Airport, Philadelphia International Airport and Newark International Airport, among others, marketing these flights as Delta Connection.

=== Pan Am subsidiary and sale to TWA ===
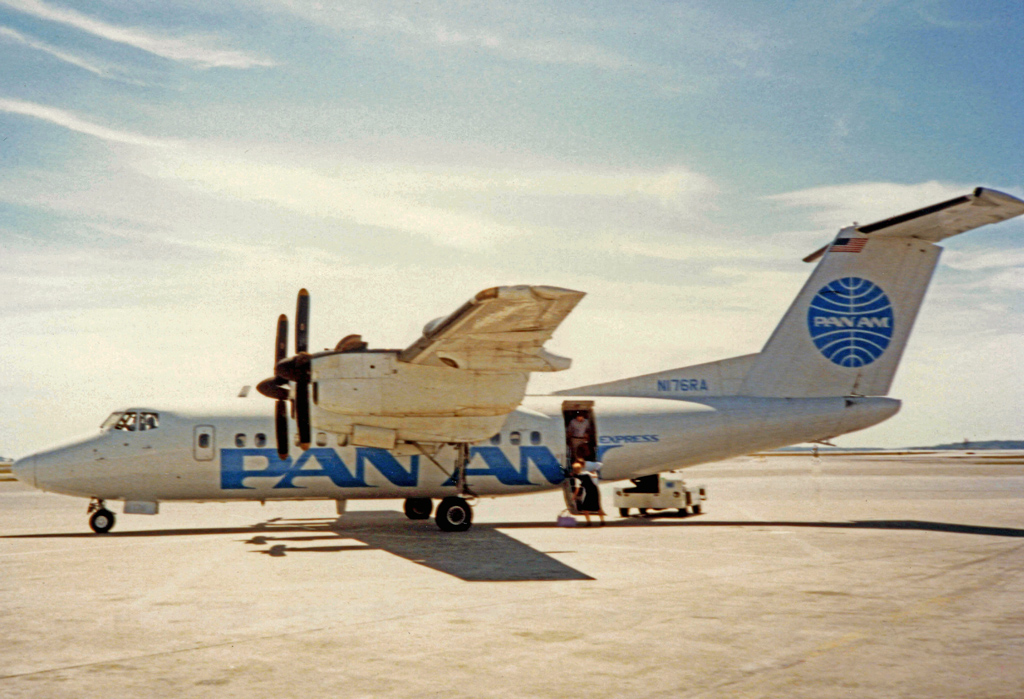
A Pan Am Express Dash 7 at Logan International Airport (1987).

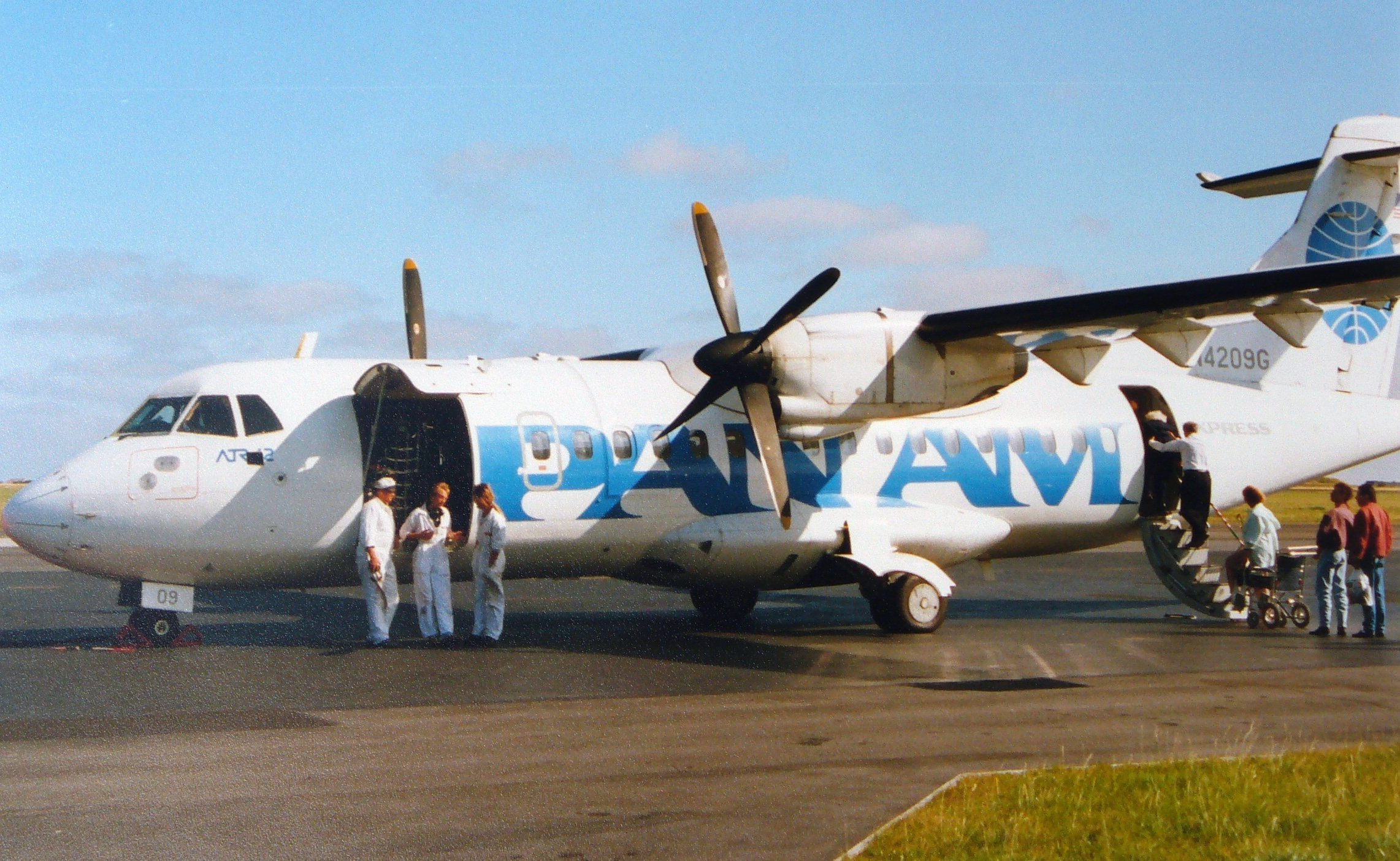
A Pan Am Express ATR 42 at Sylt Airport, Germany (1991).

In 1986, Pan American World Airways announced its intention to buy Ransome Airlines, in order to use the carrier (with the tentative Ransome Express branding) as feeder for its Worldport hub at John F. Kennedy International Airport.

Pan Am also recognized the ground breaking work done by Hank Ransome with regards to operating into Washington National Airport by utilizing the DHC-7s unique capabilities. The DHC-7 was the only transport category aircraft to be able to operate and conduct STOL (Short Takeoff and Land) operations into Washington National's airport because of the way the airport's runways all cross at the center like an asterisk. Until Hank Ransom's efforts were approved, only one runway was capable of being utilized at a time.

When the FAA approved Ransom's plan, the DHC-7 was able to conduct Day and Night VFR "STUB" operations by landing on one of the crossing runways, proving to the FAA that the airplane was capable of landing and holding short of the active runway. The DHC-7 was also able to demonstrate that it was capable of making a VFR approach to the stub runway, losing one engine and then turning sharply away and exiting the area with only 3 engines operating, and never violating the active runway's protected airspace.

The DHC-7 would, normally, land and hold short until crossing permission was received by ground control. This unique "STUB" operation was a valuable addition to Pan Am's route structure as it did not require a landing slot from ATC due to the aircraft's ability to operate on non-active crossing runways. When the acquisition was finalized in June 1987, Ransome was renamed Pan Am Express, though, operating a fleet of newly delivered ATR42s, as well Ransome's older Dash 7s. Henceforth, the airline codes PA and PXX were used.

To meet the demands of Pan Am, the structure of the route network (which had not seen any major modifications during the time as Ransome Airlines) saw a number of profound changes. In November 1987, an initial number of two ATRs was used to open up a regional network at Tegel Airport in West Berlin, competing with Berlin European UK (which had been set up in 1986). Pan Am maintained a hub there because, due to the special status of the city, only airlines from the United States, the United Kingdom or France were entitled to serve the airport. By 1990, Pan Am Express operated scheduled flights to 12 destinations in northern and central Europe from Tegel; New York (from JFK and LaGuardia) was linked to 14 airports in the northeastern United States and Canada. Also, feeder flights into Miami International Airport (during 1990 and 1991, focusing on the Bahamas) and Los Angeles International Airport were maintained. Throughout its history, the maintenance base at Northeast Philadelphia Airport was kept, though.

Following the demise of Pan American World Airways, Pan Am Express with its then 870 employees was purchased by Trans World Airlines for $28 million on 4 December 1991 and renamed Trans World Express (TWE), adopting RBD as new airline code. The European and Miami centered networks were subsequently discontinued, with John F. Kennedy International Airport becoming the sole hub for TWE. From there, 20 destinations throughout the northeastern US were served by 1993. By then, the airline had gotten rid of its Dash 7s, with the ATR 42 remaining the only aircraft type in the fleet.

Due to a lack of profitability, TWA decided to shut down Trans World Express on 6 November 1995, which resulted in the loss of 300 jobs at Northeast Philadelphia Airport, where the company had been headquartered and kept its maintenance base for the nearly four decades of its existence. The route network at JFK Airport was taken over by Trans States Airlines, with the majority of TWE's fleet of then 11 ATR 42s being acquired by Mahalo Air.

== Destinations ==
During the late 1960s, before having gone into cooperations with larger carriers, Ransome Airlines operated domestic scheduled flights to the following destinations:

City	State	Airport(s)
Baltimore	Maryland	Friendship International Airport
Atlantic City	New Jersey	Atlantic City Airport
Trenton	New Jersey	Mercer County Airport
Philadelphia	Pennsylvania	Northeast Philadelphia Airport (base); Philadelphia International Airport
Norfolk	Virginia	Newport News/Williamsburg International Airport
Richmond	Virginia	Byrd Field
Washington, D.C.		Washington National Airport

For the destinations served as Allegheny Commuter between 1970 and 1982, refer to Allegheny Commuter. When that cooperation ended, Ransome Airline once again maintained a regional network under its own name, which lasted until 1985:

Location	State	Airport(s)
Hartford	Connecticut	Bradley International Airport
Baltimore	Maryland	Friendship International Airport
Boston	Massachusetts	Logan International Airport
Worcester	Massachusetts	Worcester Regional Airport
Newark	New Jersey	Newark International Airport
Trenton	New Jersey	Mercer County Airport
Long Island	New York	Long Island MacArthur Airport
New York City	New York	John F. Kennedy International Airport; LaGuardia Airport
Philadelphia	Pennsylvania	Philadelphia International Airport
Providence	Rhode Island	T. F. Green Airport
Washington, D.C.		Dulles International Airport; Washington National Airport
New Haven	Connecticut	Tweed New Haven Airport
Groton/New London	Connecticut	Groton Airport

For information about the destinations served as Delta Connection (1984–1987), Pan Am Express (1987–1991) and Trans World Express (1991–1995), refer to the respective articles.

== Fleet ==
Over the years, Ransome Airlines operated the following aircraft types:

Aircraft	Introduced	Retired
ATR 42	1987	1995
Convair CV-580		
Jetstream 31	1990	1995
de Havilland Canada Dash 7		1995
Mohawk 298		
Volpar (Beechcraft) Model 18	1969	

== See also ==
- List of defunct airlines of the United States
