= Waterloo Regional Airport =

Airport in Iowa, United States

Waterloo Regional Airport (Livingston Betsworth Field)
- IATA: ALO; ICAO: KALO; FAA LID: ALO

Summary
- Airport type: Public
- Operator: City of Waterloo
- Serves: Waterloo, Iowa
- Elevation AMSL: 873 ft (266 m)
- Coordinates: 42°33′25″N 092°24′01″W
- Website: www.FlyALO.com

Maps
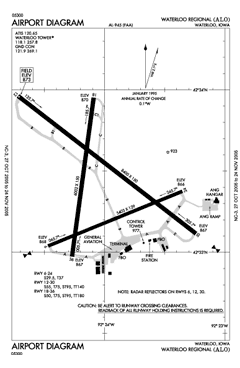
- FAA airport diagram
- Interactive map of Waterloo Regional Airport (Livingston Betsworth Field)

Runways
Direction	Length		Surface
Direction	ft	m	Surface
12/30	8,399	2,560	Asphalt
18/36	6,003	1,830	Asphalt

Statistics (2023)
- Aircraft operations (year ending 9/30/2023): 23,815
- Based aircraft: 81
- Source: Federal Aviation Administration

Waterloo Regional Airport (IATA: ALO, ICAO: KALO, FAA LID: ALO)(Livingston Betsworth Field) is four miles (6 km) northwest of Waterloo, in Black Hawk County, Iowa. It is used for general aviation and sees one airline.

== Overview ==
The airport has two gates and one jet bridge. Delta Air Lines (which had merged with Northwest Airlines) was the airport's only carrier for several years with flights to its hub at Minneapolis/Saint Paul, MN (MSP). In late 2011 Delta Air Lines said they would end service to Waterloo and immediately submitted an Essential Air Service (EAS) proposal to continue flying to Waterloo with government subsidies. As part of the EAS process, the U.S. Department of Transportation (DOT) opened up the airport to a bidding process with other carriers. American Airlines submitted a proposal to start service between Waterloo and Chicago's O'Hare International Airport operated by their regional carrier, American Eagle, via a code sharing agreement. American sent representatives to Waterloo to present to the Chamber of Commerce and a straw poll of area businesses showed local companies favored service to Chicago over Minneapolis. American said they plan to only need the EAS subsidy for two years, when they believe that service will be self-sustaining. The Waterloo city council sent a recommendation to the DOT that American be awarded the contract and on December 8 DOT awarded American Eagle the contract. The regional airline affiliate of American Airlines initially operated flights twice daily. American Eagle previously served Waterloo with ATR-42 and Saab 340 turboprop flights to Chicago during the 1990s.

== Past airline service ==
Airline service to Waterloo began in 1948, on Mid-Continent Airlines Douglas DC-3s. In 1966 Mid-Continent successor Braniff International flew BAC One-Elevens and Convair 440s to Kansas City, Minneapolis/St. Paul and St. Louis; Braniff left Waterloo the next year.

Ozark Air Lines arrived in 1955; its DC-3s flew Chicago Midway Airport - Dubuque - Waterloo - Mason City - Fort Dodge - Sioux City. By 1960 Ozark was flying Fairchild F-27s to Waterloo. Ozark Douglas DC-9-10s arrived in 1966. (Runway 12/30 had been extended from 5400 to 6500 feet around that time). In 1967 Ozark DC-9s flew nonstop to Chicago O'Hare Airport and direct to Denver via Sioux City; other flights were Fairchild F-27s, Fairchild Hiller FH-227s and Martin 4-0-4s. The April 1970 Ozark timetable lists nonstop DC-9s to Washington D.C. Dulles Airport continuing to New York LaGuardia Airport (LGA); by 1971 Ozark's direct DC-9 to Washington and New York stopped in Peoria. Besides DC-9-10s, Ozark also served Waterloo during the 1970s with McDonnell Douglas DC-9-30s and Fairchild Hiller FH-227s. In the 1975 Official Airline Guide Ozark was the only airline at Waterloo, with nonstops from Cedar Rapids, Chicago O'Hare International Airport, Des Moines, Dubuque, Mason City, Moline, Omaha, Rochester, MN, and Sioux City, a total of eighteen weekday flights, nine DC-9s and nine FH-227s. In 1976 Ozark was operating nonstop as well as direct, one stop DC-9s to Denver and one-stop DC-9s to Minneapolis/St. Paul; and direct and nonstop to Chicago O'Hare with up to seven flights a day in addition to direct flights to Omaha, St. Louis and other cities. By 1982 Ozark flights at Waterloo were all DC-9s, including direct flights to Fort Lauderdale, Fort Myers and Miami in Florida via St. Louis. Ozark successor Trans World Airlines flew DC-9s to its St. Louis hub; TWA ended mainline Waterloo service by early 1988, replaced with Trans World Express.

In 1985 Aspen Airways Convair 580s flew to Denver via Sioux City. In 1986 Air Wisconsin was independently flying BAe 146-200s and de Havilland Canada DHC-7 Dash 7s to Chicago O'Hare International Airport via Cedar Rapids or Dubuque, IA.

Several major airline regional affiliates served Waterloo during the 1980s and 1990s via code sharing flights including American Eagle, United Express, Northwest Airlink, Trans World Express, Midway Connection, and Air Midwest with the latter operating as Eastern Express on behalf of Eastern Airlines and also as Trans World Express. Besides Aspen Airways, several regional and commuter airlines independently served the airport in the past as well with turboprop service including Great Lakes Aviation, Midstate Airlines and Mississippi Valley Airlines (MVA). In 1989 turboprops flew nonstop to Chicago O'Hare Airport, Chicago Midway Airport, St. Louis, Kansas City and Minneapolis/St. Paul and to several other cities. Types operated to the airport over the years included the ATR-42, Beechcraft 99, Beechcraft 1900C, BAe Jetstream 31, Convair 580, Embraer EMB-110 Bandeirante, Embraer EMB-120 Brasilia, Saab 340 and Swearingen Metroliner. In 2007 Northwest Airlink was the only airline at Waterloo with nonstop flights to the Northwest Airlines hub in Minneapolis/St. Paul on Canadair CRJ200s and Saab 340s.

Under its founding manager, Walter Betsworth, Waterloo Municipal Airport expanded from a WWII training airstrip to a flourishing regional airport. After Betsworth's death in 1979 the airport was named The Livingston Betsworth Field, honoring Walter Betsworth and noted Iowa flying ace Jonathan Livingston. Competition from nearby airports, especially The Eastern Iowa Airport in Cedar Rapids eventually forced most airlines to drop Waterloo. Prior to its merger with Delta Air Lines, Northwest Airlink was operating the only jet service from Waterloo with a Canadair CRJ200 until Delta took over this service to Minneapolis/Saint Paul, a former Northwest hub. Delta then discontinued its Waterloo service.

== Current airline service ==
As of late 2023, Waterloo Regional Airport is being served by American Airline's subsidiary American Eagle under contract with Air Wisconsin. The only commercial aircraft with scheduled service are Air Wisconsin's Bombardier CRJ-200 regional jets, which fly twice daily (morning and evening) except for Saturdays (once at midday) between Waterloo Regional (KALO) and Chicago O'Hare Int'l (KORD).

When the original American Eagle flights began between Waterloo and Chicago, they were served by Envoy Air's Embraer ERJ-145 aircraft. The ERJ-145 service began on April 3rd, 2012 and terminated sometime in early to mid 2023 (presumably around May 1st).

Other commercial aircraft operations include chartered flights for companies and sports teams. Common chartered aircraft include Airbus A320's and Boeing 737's. The largest aircraft to operate into the field in 2023 was an Eastern Airlines Boeing 767-300, which was charted by Whitworth University out of Spokane, WA to play an NCAA Division III football playoff game against Wartburg College in Waverly, IA.

== Facilities ==
The airport covers 2,583 acres (1,045 ha) and has two asphalt runways: 12/30 is 8,399 x 150 feet (2,560 x 46 m) and 18/36 is 6,003 x 150 feet (1,830 x 46 m).

In the year ending September 30, 2023, the airport had 23,815 aircraft operations, average 65 per day: 86% general aviation, 9% air taxi 5% military, and <1% airline. In September 2023, 81 aircraft were based at this airport: 55 single-engine, 9 multi-engine, 4 jet, 5 helicopter, and 8 military.

== Airline and destination ==
Scheduled passenger service:

Airlines	Destinations
American Eagle	Chicago–O'Hare

Destinations map
Destination from Waterloo Regional Airport
Red = Year-round destination
Green = Seasonal destination
Blue = Future destination

== See also ==
- List of airports in Iowa
- Metropolitan Transit Authority of Black Hawk County

== Other sources ==
- Essential Air Service documents (Docket DOT-OST-2011-0132) from the U.S. Department of Transportation:
  - Order 2011-12-2 (December 8, 2011): selected American Eagle Airlines, a regional affiliate of American Airlines, to provide 13 nonstop round trips per week to each community, Sioux City and Waterloo, from Chicago O’Hare International Airport (ORD). Rate effective for a two-year period beginning when it inaugurated EAS at both communities through the end of the 24th month thereafter. The carrier inaugurated service at both communities on April 3, 2012, thus making the expiration date April 30, 2014. American Eagle was selected to provide service at Sioux City with 50-seat aircraft and 44-seat aircraft at Waterloo, with annual subsidy rates of $1,512,799 and $1,541,824, respectively.
  - Order 2014-3-14 (March 28, 2014): selecting American Airlines to provide Essential Air Service (EAS) at Sioux City and Waterloo, Iowa, for annual subsidies of $611,334 and $945,546, respectively. EAS to be Provided to Waterloo, Iowa - Effective Period: May 1, 2014, through April 30, 2016. Service: Thirteen (13) nonstop round trips per week to Chicago (ORD). Aircraft Type: Regional Jets, 44-50 seats.
