= Berlin European UK =

Regional UK airline based at Berlin-Tegel Airport

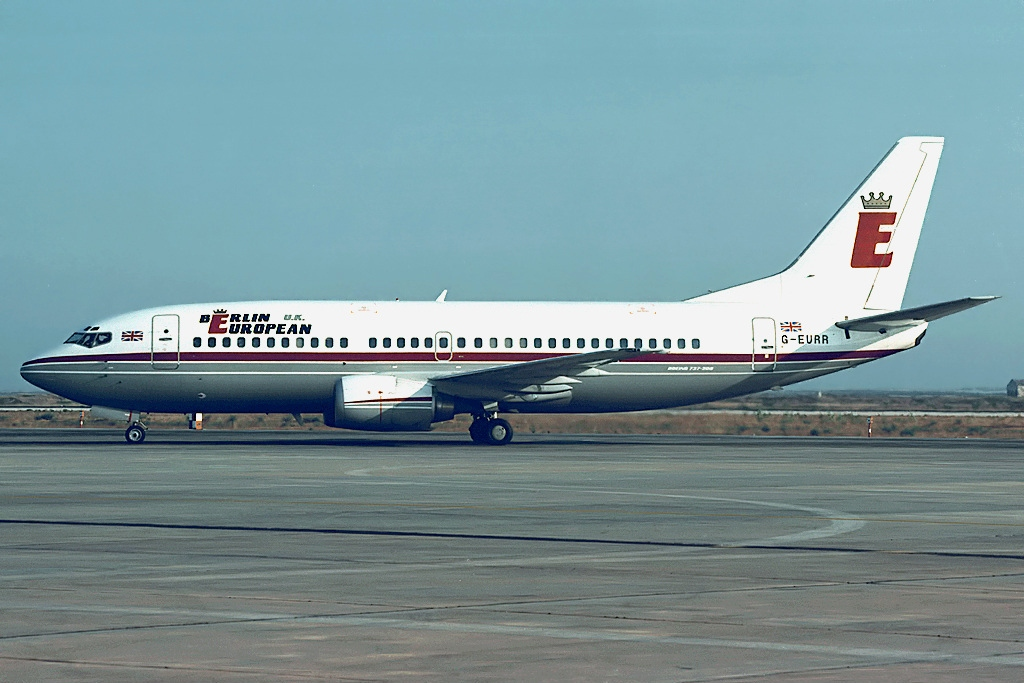
- Boeing 737-300
IATA	ICAO	Call sign
WZ (former)	—	—
- Founded: 1986
- Commenced operations: 1987
- Ceased operations: 1991 (merged operations into Germania)
- Operating bases: Berlin Tegel airport
- Hubs: Berlin Tegel airport
- Key people: Richard "Dick" Twomey General Manager

Berlin European UK is a defunct regional UK airline based at Tegel Airport in what used to be West Berlin in the days prior to Germany's reunification.

== History ==
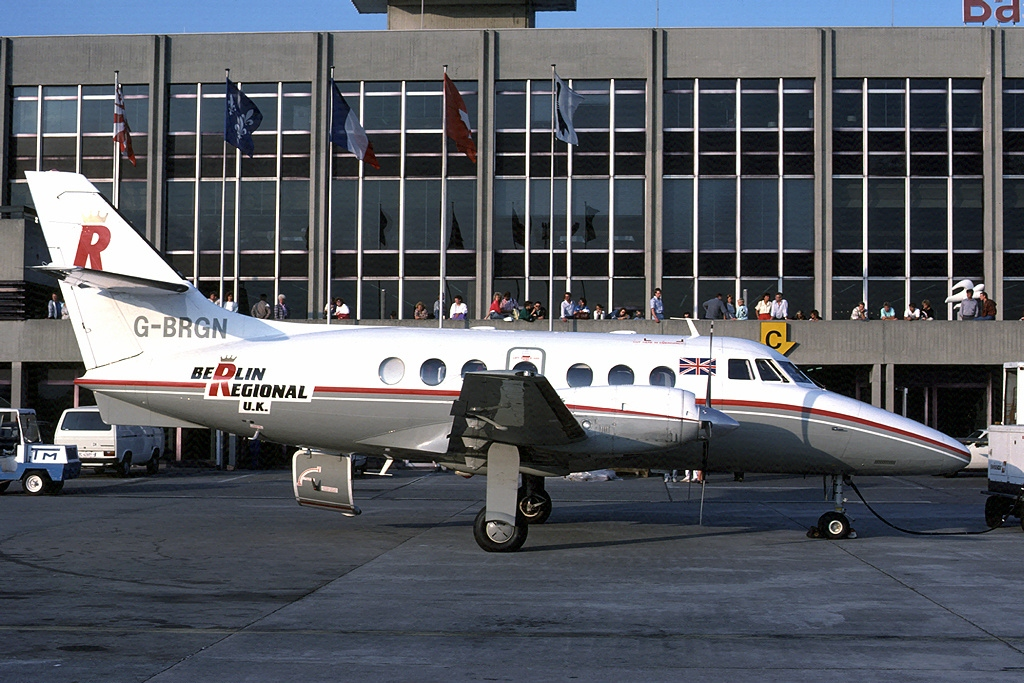
BAe Jetstream 31

Captain Richard "Dick" Twomey, a former British Airways pilot and general manager in Berlin, was the founder and majority owner of Berlin Regional UK, Berlin European's original name.

Preparations for Berlin Regional's launch were complete in December 1985, following which the airline was legally constituted in 1986.

The initial fleet comprised two BAe Jetstream 31 commuter turboprop planes. These featured a reduced seat capacity of 16 (rather than the more usual 19). While Berlin Regional employed its own maintenance engineers at Tegel Airport for routine maintenance tasks, East Midlands Airport-based maintenance engineering contractor Field Aviation performed heavy maintenance on Berlin Regional's Jetstreams.

Both the UK Civil Aviation Authority (CAA) and West Berlin's Allied Air Attachés had licensed Berlin Regional to operate year-round, daily scheduled services from Berlin Tegel to Basel, Brussels, Copenhagen, Friedrichshafen, Geneva and Kiel. None of these destinations was served from any West Berlin airport on a regular, scheduled basis at the time of Berlin Regional's application for traffic rights to the relevant authorities.

In April 1987 Berlin Regional inaugurated its first two scheduled routes from Berlin Tegel to Copenhagen and Geneva. Basel and Friedrichshafen joined Berlin Regional's scheduled route network in June. Services to Brussels never got off the ground, as a result of US major TWA's subsequent decision to enter the Tegel–Brussels market with a much bigger Boeing 727-100 from July 1987. Poor loads to Basel and Geneva forced Berlin Regional to combine these services. When Pan Am Express launched a competing Tegel–Basel route in November 1987, Berlin Regional dropped Basel from its schedule. Like Brussels, Kiel was never served, as a result of Pan Am Express's decision to serve this destination from Tegel itself. Ultimately, Copenhagen and Friedrichshafen were Berlin Regional's only surviving scheduled destinations.

=== Rebranding and new equipment ===
On 4 May 1988 Capt. Twomey held a press conference in Berlin during which he announced a new strategy for his airline. This strategy envisaged the adoption of a new name for the airline as well as the replacement of the regional turboprop fleet with "mainline" jet equipment, thereby enabling the company to exit the overcrowded, cut-throat regional scheduled market from Berlin and to apply for scheduled licences to serve higher margin trunk routes, as well as to enter the lucrative inclusive tour (IT) charter market under contract to the city's leading package tour operators. As a result, Berlin Regional UK would become Berlin European UK and lease a new Boeing 737-300. However, an unsuccessful application for a scheduled route licence to serve the prestigious Berlin–Frankfurt route with up to four daily flights in each direction resulted in Berlin European subleasing this aircraft to fellow UK independent (Note: independent from government-owned corporations) Monarch Airlines from October 1988. Berlin European arranged for the aircraft, which had already been painted in Berlin European's livery, to be directly transferred from the manufacturer's Seattle plant in the US to Monarch's Luton base in the UK. All remaining Berlin European scheduled services ceased at the end of the 1989/90 winter timetable period.

Following the cessation of scheduled operations, the air carrier leased another new 737-300 for sole use on charter flights to the Mediterranean and the Canary Islands from its Tegel base. This aircraft was contracted to Germany's biggest tour operator TUI and to Berliner Flugring, at the time Berlin's leading package tour operator, from the beginning of the 1990 summer season.

With the reunification of the two Germanies which took place that year, German airlines took over the scheduled and charter operations which had previously been undertaken, under the terms of the post-World War II Potsdam Agreement, by the British, American and French airline operators. Capt Twomey reluctantly decided to sell Berlin European's airport slots and other effects to Germania, with effect from 1 April 1991. On that day Berlin European's Air Operator Certificate expired and the transfer of its ownership to Germania became effective.

== Fleet ==
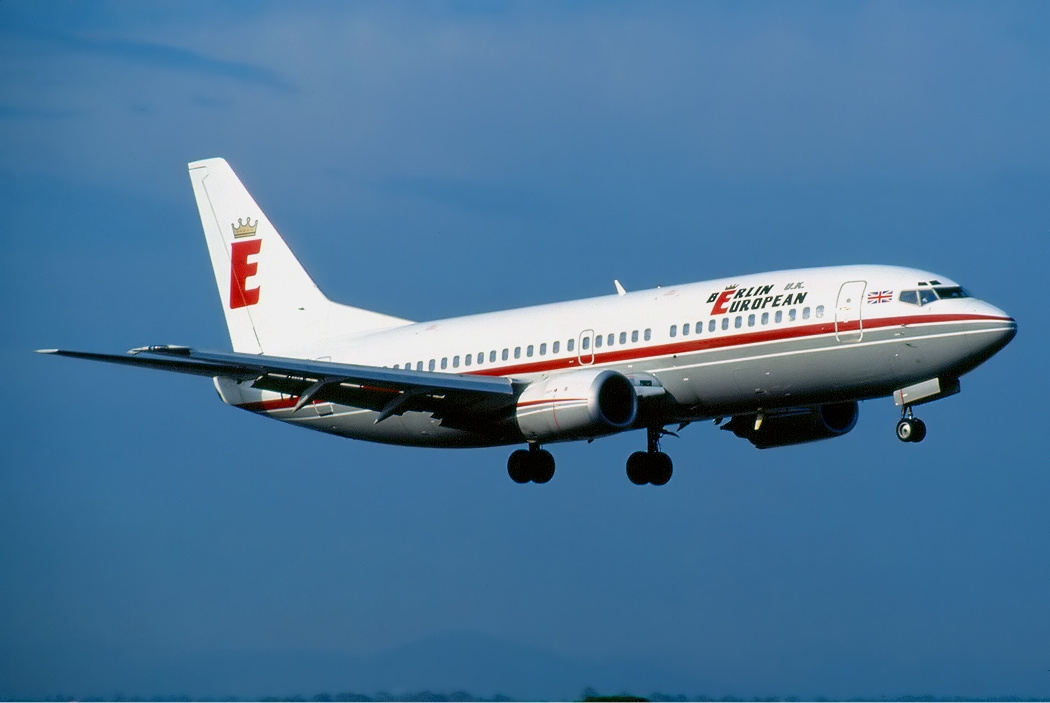
A Berlin European 737-300

Berlin Regional UK /Berlin European UK operated the following aircraft types:

- 2 x BAe Jetstream 31
- 2 x Boeing 737-300

== See also ==
- List of defunct airlines of the United Kingdom
