= Marion Municipal Airport (Ohio) =

Public use airport in Marion, Ohio

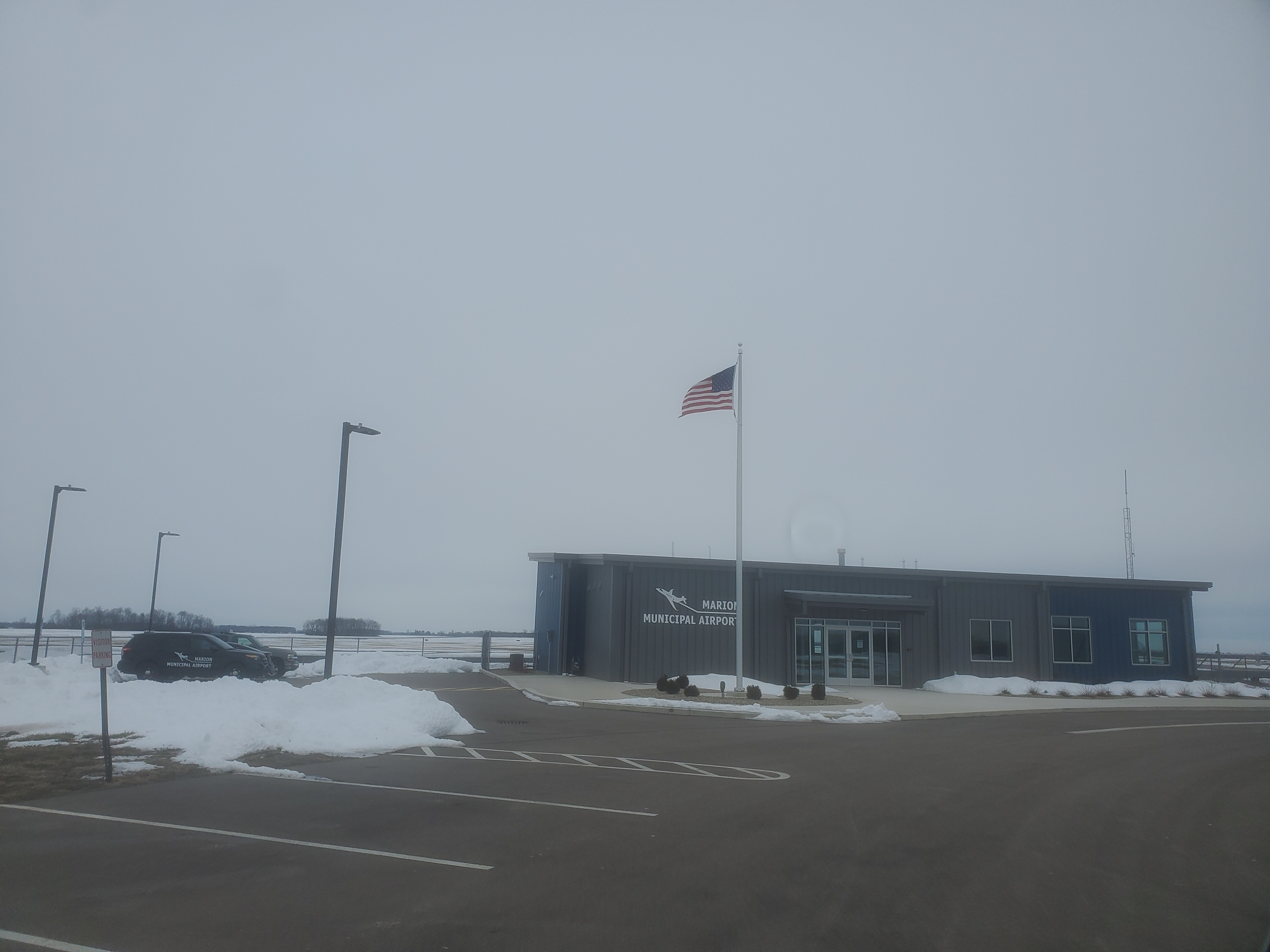
- IATA: MNN; ICAO: KMNN; FAA LID: MNN

Summary
- Airport type: Public
- Owner: City of Marion
- Serves: Marion, Ohio
- Location: Marion County, Ohio
- Time zone: UTC−05:00 (-5)
  - Summer (DST): UTC−04:00 (-4)
- Elevation AMSL: 993 ft (303 m)
- Coordinates: 40°36′58″N 083°03′48″W

Map
- Location within Ohio Location within the United States

Runways
Direction	Length		Surface
Direction	ft	m	Surface
7/25	5,000	1,524	Asphalt
13/31	3,498	1,066	Asphalt

Statistics (2009)
- Aircraft operations: 35,770
- Based aircraft: 48
- Source: Federal Aviation Administration

Marion Municipal Airport (IATA: MNN, ICAO: KMNN, FAA LID: MNN) is three miles northeast of Marion, in Marion County, Ohio. The FAA's National Plan of Integrated Airport Systems for 2011–2015 categorized it as a general aviation facility. The airport opened in 1950 and has two asphalt runways.

== History ==
Planning for the Marion Municipal Airport began in 1943. It was argued a new airport was needed as the existing one was hemmed in by roads, rail lines and the Little Scioto River. Groundbreaking was held on 14 October 1948. The airport was opened on 1 September 1950 when the first two airline flights landed at the airport. At the time it had a 3,500 ft (1,100 m) northwest-southeast runway, a 4,300 ft (1,300 m) northeast-southwest runway and a 1,800 ft (550 m) north-south taxiway connecting the two.

A crash 70 miles in October 1950 away was blamed on the airport beacon not being turned on. However, it was only one month after the airport had opened and the beacon could not be operated since the CAA had not inspected the lighting systems at the airport yet. By mid November 1952, three companies based aircraft at the airport. The 640-acre (260 ha) airport was dedicated on 16 August 1953.

The airport saw commercial airline service by TWA, from 1950 through 1953 and by Lake Central Airlines from 1953 through 1961. The airport then saw service from small commuter airlines during the 1960s.

Construction of a 10,000-square-foot (930 m^{2}) hangar north of the terminal was proposed in mid 1968.

A runway extension and parallel taxiway were nearly complete by late November 1984.

A new airport manager took over in November 1990. An industrial park was proposed to the north of the airport in 1991.

Marion city council authorized the purchase of 186 acres (75 ha) for a runway extension in mid March 2007.

A new terminal was unveiled at the airport's 70th anniversary in September 2020.

The airport has been home to the Central Ohio Soaring Association since 1959. The group provides training in gliders as well as gatherings and activities for current pilots.

== Facilities and aircraft ==
Marion Municipal Airport covers 658 acres (266 ha) at an elevation of 993 feet (303 m). It has two asphalt runways: runway 7/25 measures 5,000 by 100 feet (1,524 x 30 m) and is paved with asphalt; runway 13/31 measures 3,498 by 100 feet (1,066 x 30 m) and is also paved with asphalt.

The airport has two fixed-base operators that offer fuel as well as services such as general maintenance, catering, hangaring, courtesy transportation, crew lounges, snooze rooms, and more. A new terminal opened at the airport in 2020.

In 2021, the airport received funds to upgrade facilities such as runways, taxiways, a terminal, connections to transit, and roadway projects.

For the 12 month period ending September 17, 2020, the airport had 35,770 aircraft operations, an average of 98 per day: 98% general aviation, 1% air taxi, and <1% military. 48 aircraft were then based at the airport: 18 single-engine and 3 multi-engine airplanes as well as 27 gliders.

== Accidents and incidents ==
- On 10 December 1968, a small plane crashed while attempting to land at the airport, killing the pilot and seriously injuring a passenger.
- On May 4, 1997, a Marsh-Turner BG-12A glider struck terrain after departure from the Marion Municipal Airport. The tow pilot state that, at approximately 1,000 foot above ground, the glider pilot asked to slow down due to turbulence. A minute later, the glider pilot went out of position, including making vertical position changes, and went off tow. The glider subsequently descended at a high rate of speed with pitch oscillations before crashing. The probable cause of the accident was found to be the disconnection of the elevator control rod, which resulted in the loss of elevator control.
- On August 23, 2003, a Cessna A185F Skywagon was substantially damaged while landing at Marion Municipal Airport. Shortly after touchdown, the airplane began to swerve left, and the pilot heard a scraping sound. The right main landing gear collapsed, the right wing contacted the runway, and the airplane came to rest on the runway. The probable cause of the accident was found to be fatigue and corrosion of the right main landing gear attachment, which resulted in a gear collapse while landing.
- On August 23, 2003, a homebuilt Sorrell Hiperbipe aircraft crashed following a loss of engine power while departing Marion Municipal Airport. The power loss began gradually between 250 and 400 feet above the ground, and the aircraft could not maintain altitude. The pilot attempted an emergency landing, and both onboard escaped successfully. The probable cause of the accident was found to be the pilot's improper decision to install an inadequate air filter, which subsequently failed and resulted in a power loss.
- On April 2, 2005, a Cessna 182 Skylane impacted terrain during an instrument approach to the Marion Municipal Airport following an encounter with in-flight icing. The pilot reported airframe icing while enroute to the Mansfield Lahm Regional Airport and decided to divert to Marion. While on approach, the airplane began descending at a rate that the pilot could not arrest, and it impacted the ground in a wings level attitude 250 short of the runway. During the impact, the nose wheel dug into the ground, and the airplane nosed over, coming to rest inverted. The probable cause of the accident was found to be the pilot's inadequate in-flight planning/decision which resulted in an encounter with icing conditions and the accretion of ice on the airframe. Also causal was the pilot's improper setting of the flaps in icing conditions, which resulted in a stall/mush.
- On August 5, 2017, a Grob G102 Astir glider crashed after releasing from its tow plane at the Marion Municipal Airport. The pilot stated that he made a mistake during his before takeoff checks and forgot to latch the glider's canopy. After climbing a "few hundred feet," the canopy came open. While the pilot was trying to close the canopy, he lost sight of the Cessna 150 tow airplane, so he released the tow line and made a turn to the right. He attempted to land in a bean field, but the glider struck a tree and impacted the field. A witness who observed the glider during the accident flight reported that the glider's wing spoilers were extended during the flight, thus preventing both the glider and its tow plane from climbing normally. The witness reported that the glider detached from the ground a couple hundred feet above the ground and attempted to turn with the spoilers still extended before clipping its wing on a tree and crashing. The probable cause of the accident was found to be the pilot’s failure to follow the before takeoff checklist, which resulted in an improper takeoff configuration and subsequent uncontrolled descent into terrain during a departure climb.
- On October 31, 2023, a Piper Cherokee Six crashed in a bean field near the airport.

== See also ==
- List of airports in Ohio
