= Alpha Air =

American regional airline

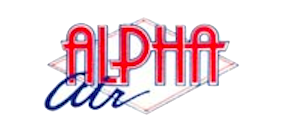
IATA	ICAO	Call sign
7V	ALH	ALPHA AIR
- Founded: 1976; 50 years ago
- Ceased operations: 1995; 31 years ago
- Fleet size: 2 (1995)
- Headquarters: Los Angeles

Alpha Air is a defunct regional airline based in Los Angeles.

== History ==
Alpha Air was founded in 1984 with base Van Nuys Airport and operated flights between Bishop and Mammoth Lakes from Los Angeles with a Cessna 402. Alpha Air was the first scheduled airline to fly to Bishop which previously had no scheduled airline service. In 1985 Alpha Air moved its hub to LAX to serve the more demand of passengers. The airline then added routes to Lake Havasu City, Laughlin/Bullhead City and Oakland.

The airline continued to serve this route network until 1987 when the airline attempted to buy the operating certificate of bankrupt Royal West Airlines. The airline failed to purchase the certificate and in late 1987 the airline added routes to San Jose and Inyokern. In 1988 Alpha Air added "tourist" services to the Grand Canyon from LAX. The airline then leased two Beechcraft 1900C commuter propjets, and they were delivered on the second March 1990. The airline utilized the Beechcraft aircraft on local services from LAX to Santa Catalina Islands and Big Bear Lake.

In 1991 the airline began a codeshare with luxury carrier, MGM Grand Air and formed Grand Connection utilizing a leased de Havilland Canada DHC-6 Twin Otter commuter turboprop aircraft. Grand Connection began to operate services between Los Angeles (LAX) and Orange County (SNA). This service was aimed at business clients in the Orange County area. By the end of the year the contract between MGM Grand Air and Alpha Air was terminated.

The airline continued to expand its services and in 1992 added Burbank, Orange County and South Lake Tahoe to the network. In 1993 after repeated negotiations, the airline became a full TWExpress carrier and continued to operate their network under the TWA brand via a code sharing agreement with Trans World Airlines. By 1994 the route network consisted of Burbank, Los Angeles and Orange County to both Mammoth Lakes and South Lake Tahoe, as well as a single flight to the Grand Canyon. The airline suffered during TWA's first bankruptcy in 1992 and during the TWA bankruptcy in 1995 the airline itself filed for bankruptcy in September and had all of its aircraft repossessed.

== Destinations ==
This is a list of Alpha Air's destinations throughout its existence:

=== Alpha Air Proper ===
- Los Angeles (LAX) - Hub
- Bishop (BIH)
- Mammoth Lakes (MMH)
- Lake Havasu City (HII)
- Laughlin/Bullhead City (IFP)
- Oakland (OAK)
- San Jose (SJC)
- Inyokern (IYK)
- Santa Catalina Islands (AVX)
- Big Bear Lake (RBF)
- Orange County (SNA)
- Burbank (BUR)
- South Lake Tahoe (TVL)
- Grand Canyon (GCN)

=== As TWExpress ===
- Los Angeles (LAX) - Hub
- Burbank (BUR)
- Orange County (SNA)
- Mammoth Lakes (MMH)
- South Lake Tahoe (TVL)

== Fleet ==
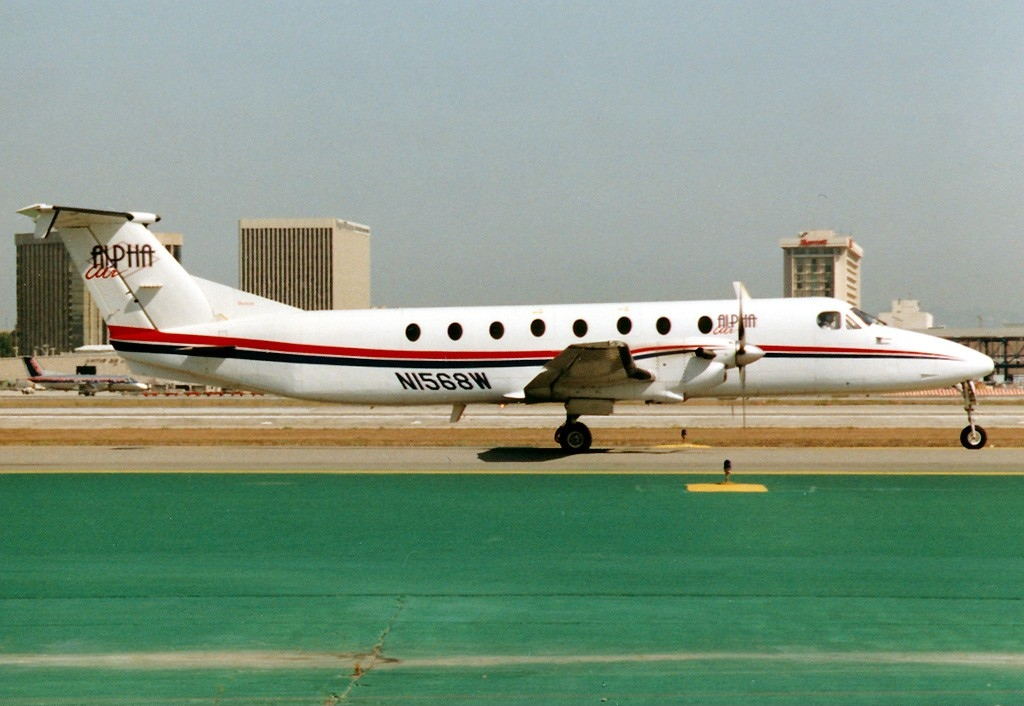
An Alpha Air Beech 1900C at LAX

The fleet of Alpha Air consisted of:

- 3 Beechcraft 1900Cs
- 1 Cessna 402
- 1 de Havilland Twin Otter (as Grand Connection)

== See also ==
- List of Defunct Airlines of the United States
