= Trans World Express =

Regional airline of the United States (1993–1995)

Trans World Express (TWE) was the fully owned and certified regional carrier for Trans World Airlines (TWA) and an airline trademark name for TWA's corporation.

- Trans World Express - The formerly independent regional airline known as Ransome Airlines previously owned by Pan Am (PA) before its purchase by the Trans World Corporation for TWA.
- TWE - the outsourced carriers flying as Trans World Express:
  - Air Midwest
  - Alpha Air
  - Trans States Airlines
  - Metro Air Northeast

When American Airlines bought TWA, the regional airlines functioning under the Trans World Express "banner" became affiliated with American Airlines under the name and new banner air carrier branding AmericanConnection. Trans World Express service at that time was being provided by Trans States Airlines, Chautauqua Airlines, and Corporate Airlines (later RegionsAir).

== History ==
Until November 6, 1995, TWE, Inc., a wholly owned subsidiary of TWA, operated flights under the Trans World Express banner. This fully certificated airline, previously named and certificated as Ransome Airlines - Pan Am Express, was headquartered at Philadelphia Northeast Airport far from TWA's (John F. Kennedy International Airport and (STL) St Louis hubs.

After that date, November 6, 1995, TWA outsourced all TWE operations to third-party "banner" airlines. Other airlines previously operating under the name and TWE "banner" included Resort Air and Metro Air Northeast.

Most flights were from the Eastern Seaboard to New York's John F. Kennedy International Airport or from the South and Midwest to Lambert-Saint Louis International Airport.

In 1993, Alpha Air was operating Trans World Express service with Beechcraft 1900C turboprops from a hub at Los Angeles International Airport (LAX) with service to Burbank (BUR), Grand Canyon (GCN), Lake Tahoe (TVL), Mammoth Lakes (MMH), Palm Springs (PSP), Phoenix (PHX) and Santa Ana/Orange County Airport (SNA, now John Wayne Airport).

== Fleet ==
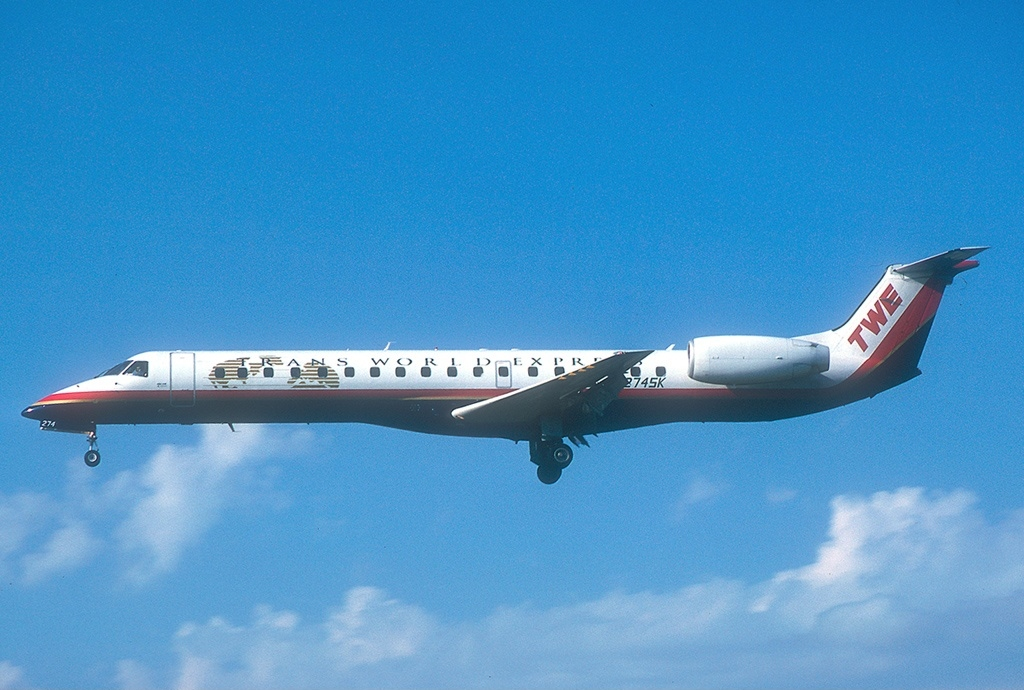
Trans World Express Embraer ERJ-145

The following aircraft were contracted and operating in the TWExpress system at the time of TWA's merger with American Airlines and the TWExpress brand was discontinued:

- Embraer ERJ-145
- ATR-72
- ATR-42
- Jetstream 41
- Jetstream 31/32

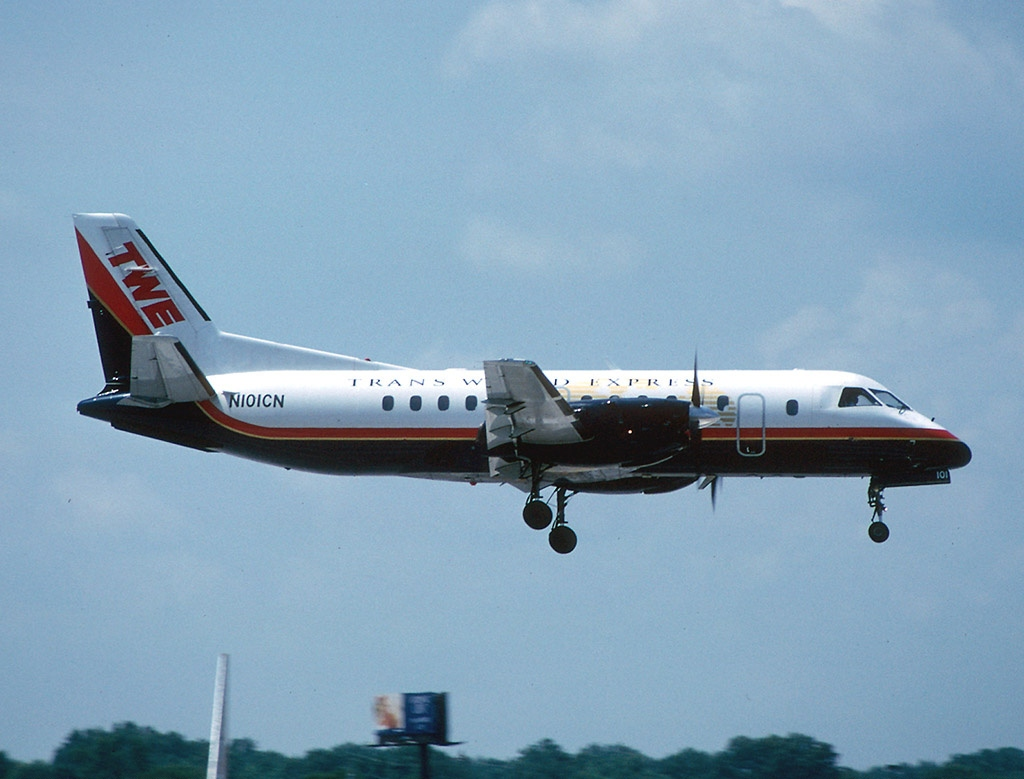
Trans World Express Saab 340

Other aircraft that appeared in TWE colors included:

- Beechcraft 1900C
- Saab 340
- de Havilland Canada DHC-7 Dash 7
- de Havilland Canada DHC-6 Twin Otter
- Fairchild Metro II/III
- CASA C-212 Aviocar
- EMB-120 Brasilia

== Destinations at closure ==
Trans World Express, via flights operated by Trans States Airlines, Corporate Airlines and Chautauqua Airlines, was serving the following destinations when the Trans World Express code share service was halted:

=== Canada ===
Ontario

- Toronto (Lester B. Pearson International Airport)

=== United States ===
Arkansas

- Bentonville/Fayetteville (Northwest Arkansas Regional Airport)

Illinois

- Bloomington/Normal (Central Illinois Regional Airport)
- Champaign/Urbana (University of Illinois Willard Airport)
- Decatur (Decatur Airport)
- Marion (Williamson County Regional Airport)
- Moline (Quad City International Airport)
- Peoria (Greater Peoria Regional Airport)
- Quincy (Quincy Regional Airport)
- Springfield (Abraham Lincoln Capital Airport)

Indiana

- Evansville (Evansville Regional Airport)
- Fort Wayne (Fort Wayne International Airport)
- Indianapolis (Indianapolis International Airport)
- South Bend (South Bend Regional Airport)

Iowa

- Burlington (Southeast Iowa Regional Airport)
- Cedar Rapids (The Eastern Iowa Airport)
- Sioux City (Sioux Gateway Airport)
- Waterloo (Waterloo Regional Airport)

Kentucky

- Cincinnati, Ohio area (Cincinnati-Northern Kentucky International Airport)
- Lexington (Blue Grass Regional Airport)
- Owensboro (Owensboro-Daviess County Regional Airport)
- Paducah (Barkley Regional Airport)

Louisiana

- Shreveport (Shreveport Regional Airport)

Michigan

- Grand Rapids (Gerald R. Ford International Airport)

Minnesota

- Rochester (Rochester International Airport)

Mississippi

- Jackson (Jackson-Evers International Airport)

Missouri

- Cape Girardeau (Cape Girardeau Regional Airport)
- Columbia (Columbia Regional Airport)
- Fort Leonard Wood (Waynesville Regional Airport at Forney Field)
- Joplin (Joplin Regional Airport)
- Kirksville (Kirksville Regional Airport)
- Springfield/Branson (Springfield-Branson National Airport)
- St. Louis (Lambert-St. Louis International Airport) Hub

Nebraska

- Lincoln (Lincoln Airport)

Ohio (for Cincinnati, see Kentucky)

- Dayton (Dayton International Airport)

South Carolina

- Charleston (Charleston International Airport)
- Greenville-Spartanburg (Greenville-Spartanburg International Airport)

Tennessee

- Jackson (McKellar-Sipes Regional Airport)
- Knoxville (McGhee Tyson Airport)
- Memphis (Memphis International Airport)
- Nashville (Nashville International Airport)

Wisconsin

- Madison (Dane County Regional Airport)

== Previous destinations ==
United States

Alabama

- Birmingham (Birmingham International Airport)

Arizona

- Grand Canyon (Grand Canyon National Park Airport)
- Phoenix (Phoenix Sky Harbor International Airport)

Arkansas

- Fort Smith (Fort Smith Regional Airport)
- Harrison (Boone County Regional Airport)
- Little Rock (Clinton National Airport)

California

- Burbank (now Hollywood-Burbank Airport)
- Inyokern (Inyokern Airport)
- Lake Tahoe (Lake Tahoe Airport)
- Los Angeles (Los Angeles International Airport) - Hub (at the time of the acquisition of Trans World Airlines by American Airlines in 2001, both TWA and Trans World Connection operated by American Eagle were serving Los Angeles. Alpha Air earlier served LAX as Trans World Express.)
- Mammoth Lakes (Mammoth Yosemite Airport)
- Oxnard (Oxnard Airport)
- Palm Springs (Palm Springs International Airport) (At the time of TWA's end in 2001 Trans World Connection served Palm Springs)
- Palmdale (LA/Palmdale Regional Airport)
- Santa Ana/Orange County Airport (now John Wayne Airport) (at the time of TWA's end in 2001 both the mainline airline and Trans World Connection operated by American Eagle served Orange County. Alpha Air earlier served Orange County Airport as Trans World Express.)

Connecticut

- Hartford (Bradley International Airport) (At the time of TWA's end in 2001 both the mainline airline and Trans World Connection served Hartford)

Illinois

- Chicago (Midway Airport) (At the time of TWA's end in 2001 the mainline airline served nearby O'Hare International Airport in Chicago)

Kentucky

- Louisville (Standiford Field) (At the time of TWA's end in 2001 the mainline airline served Louisville)

Maine

- Portland (Portland International Jetport)

Maryland

- Baltimore (Baltimore-Washington International Airport) (At the time of TWA's end in 2001 both the mainline airline and Trans World Connection served Baltimore)

Massachusetts

- Boston (Logan International Airport) (At the time of TWA's end in 2001 both the mainline airline and Trans World Connection served Boston)

Missouri

- Lake of the Ozarks (Lee C. Fine Memorial Airport)

New Hampshire

- Manchester (Manchester-Boston Regional Airport)

New York

- Albany (Albany International Airport) (At the time of TWA's end in 2001 Trans World Connection served Albany)
- Binghamton (Greater Binghamton Airport)
- Buffalo (Buffalo Niagara International Airport) (At the time of TWA's end in 2001 Trans World Connection served Buffalo)
- Ithaca (Ithaca Tompkins Regional Airport)
- New York City (At the time of TWA's end in 2001 both the mainline airline and Trans World Connection served New York City)
  - John F. Kennedy International Airport - Hub
  - LaGuardia Airport - Hub
- Newburgh (Stewart International Airport)
- Rochester (Greater Rochester International Airport) (At the time of TWA's end in 2001 Trans World Connection served Rochester)
- Syracuse (Syracuse Hancock International Airport) (At the time of TWA's end in 2001 Trans World Connection served Syracuse)

Pennsylvania

- Harrisburg (Harrisburg International Airport)
- Pittsburgh (Pittsburgh International Airport) (At the time of TWA's end in 2001 both the mainline airline and Trans World Connection served Pittsburgh)
- Wilkes-Barre/Scranton (Wilkes-Barre/Scranton International Airport)

Rhode Island

- Providence (T. F. Green Airport) (At the time of TWA's end in 2001 Trans World Connection served Providence)

Virginia

- Norfolk/Virginia Beach/Williamsburg (Norfolk International Airport) (At the time of TWA's end in 2001 the mainline airline served Norfolk)
- Richmond (Richmond International Airport) (At the time of TWA's end in 2001 the mainline airline served Richmond)
- Washington, DC area (At the time of TWA's end in 2001 both the mainline airline and Trans World Connection served Washington, DC)

== See also ==
- List of defunct airlines of the United States
