= Midstate Airlines =

IATA	ICAO	Call sign
IU	MIS	MIDSTATE
- Founded: 1964; 62 years ago
- Ceased operations: 1989; 37 years ago
- Hubs: Marshfield, Central Wisconsin Airport
- Fleet size: 27
- Destinations: 17
- Headquarters: Stevens Point, Wisconsin
- Key people: Roy P. Shwery (President), Bryce Appleton (CEO 1983–1993)

Midstate Airlines (also known as Mid-State Airlines and Midstate Air Commuter (MAC)) was an airline with its headquarters in Stevens Point, Wisconsin, United States.

== History ==
It was founded by Roy P. Shwery in 1964 and provided air service out of Marshfield, Wisconsin (home to Marshfield Clinic), and Central Wisconsin Airport (CWA). The airline originally operated a fleet of Beechcraft Model 18 aircraft, and later, four Beech 99s. The airline originally flew from Marshfield, to Wisconsin Rapids, to Milwaukee, and on to Chicago. (Central Wisconsin Airport serves the communities of Stevens Point, Wausau, Marshfield, and Wisconsin Rapids, Wisconsin, and the smaller suburbs—Mosinee, Plover, and Rosholt—with long runways that accommodated large jet aircraft.)

By the early 1970s, Midstate also was serving Hayward and Ashland, Wisconsin from the Central Wisconsin Airport and Ashland from the Minneapolis - St. Paul International Airport. One of its most fondly-remembered features was the 6:00 PM "Champagne Flight" out of O'Hare, destined for Ashland via Milwaukee, the CWA, and Hayward. Shortly after takeoff from Milwaukee, the passengers were invited to open a cooler put on board in Milwaukee and prepared by Midstate's President's wife. Typically, in the cooler were soft drinks, beers, Wisconsin cheese, chips, and champagne. This icebreaker generated an informality and good feeling for passengers.

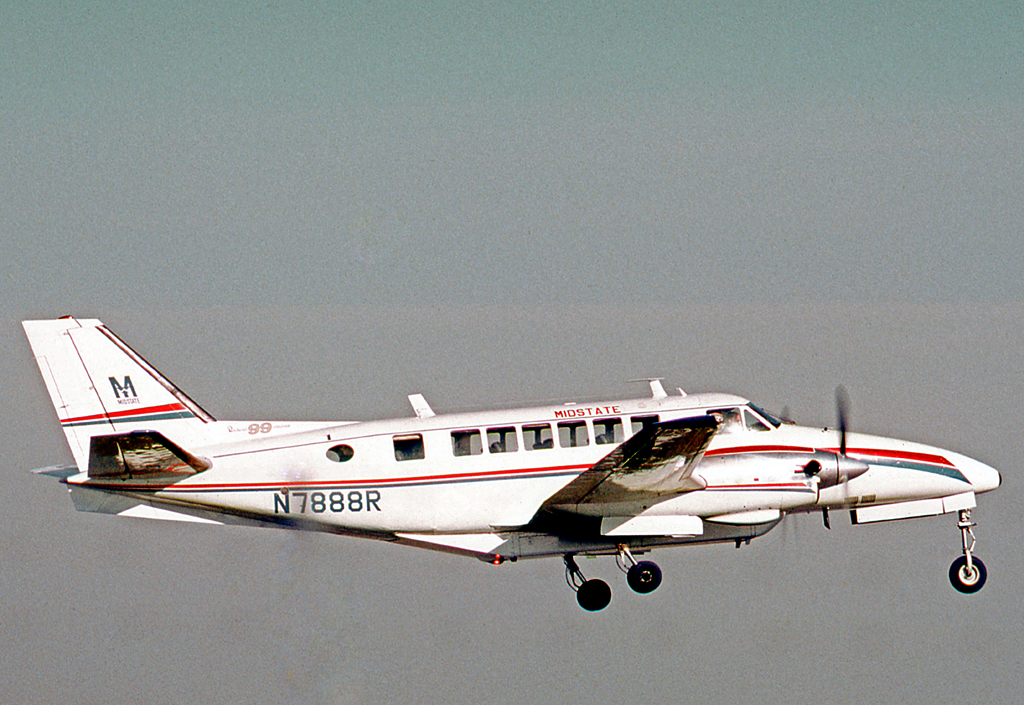
Beech 99 twin turboprop 17-passenger aircraft of Midstate Airlines landing at Chicago O'Hare in December 1973

In 1977 Midstate switched to 19-passenger Swearingen Metroliners.

On January 15, 1979, a Metroliner landed in Wisconsin Rapids, hydroplaned, swerved, and collided with a snowbank, resulting in 11 injuries (two pilots, nine passengers). Damage to the aircraft was substantial.

In its heyday, Midstate operated a fleet of 19 Metroliners and added six Fokker F27 50-passenger turboprop aircraft in 1984 (which required a flight attendant and a certificate modification under FAA part 121 rules), and flew to 15 cities in Wisconsin, Minnesota, Iowa, Missouri, Indiana, Michigan, Ohio, and Chicago O'Hare airport.

The airline was purchased from Shwery by Sentry Insurance of Stevens Point, and subsequently resold to CEO and investor Bryce Appleton in 1986.

In 1986, Midstate subleased Fokker F27 aircraft to Chicago Air, a start-up carrier operated a regional service out of Chicago Midway International Airport. Midstate provided maintenance services to Chicago Air out of Central Wisconsin. However, Chicago Air went into bankruptcy the same year, and Appleton purchased what remained of the Midstate's assets from Sentry Insurance. The Chicago O'Hare takeoff and landing slots were sold off and Appleton continued to operate the Swearingen Metroliners, establishing a hub in Milwaukee. However, the airline continued to cut back service, providing charter, ceasing operations in 1989.

== Historical fleet ==
Midstate Airlines previously operated the following aircraft:

- ? Beechcraft 18
- 4 Beechcraft 99
- 7 Fokker F27 Friendship
- 19 Swearingen SA227-AC Metro III

== See also ==
- List of defunct airlines of the United States
