= Trans World Connection =

Regional airline of the United States (1999–2001)

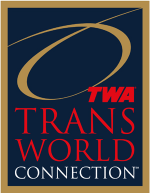
Trans World Connection logo

Trans World Connection (TWC) was an affiliated brand name with Trans World Airlines (TWA) beginning in September 1999. Other regional and commuter airlines operated code sharing service for TWA as Trans World Express.

The brand ended in December 2001, after American Airlines acquired the assets of TWA.

The brand name was used for American Eagle Airlines service from Los Angeles International Airport in Los Angeles, California and with Trans States Airlines at John F. Kennedy International Airport in New York City, New York.

Gulfstream International Airlines operated flights under the Trans World Connection name beginning in October, 1999.

== Destinations ==
=== Destinations at closure ===
All were operated by AmericanConnection.

Canada

- Quebec
  - Montreal (Dorval International Airport)

United States

- California
  - Bakersfield (Meadows Field Airport)
  - Fresno (Fresno Yosemite International Airport)
  - Los Angeles (Los Angeles International Airport) Hub
  - Monterey (Monterey Peninsula Airport)
  - Palm Springs (Palm Springs International Airport)
  - San Diego (San Diego International Airport)
  - San Luis Obispo (San Luis Obispo County Regional Airport)
  - Santa Barbara (Santa Barbara Airport)
- Connecticut
  - Hartford (Bradley International Airport)
- Maryland
  - Baltimore (Baltimore-Washington International Airport)
- Massachusetts
  - Boston (Logan International Airport)
  - Worcester (Worcester Regional Airport)
- New York
  - Albany (Albany International Airport)
  - Buffalo (Buffalo Niagara International Airport)
  - New York City (John F. Kennedy International Airport Hub
  - Rochester (Greater Rochester International Airport)
  - Syracuse (Syracuse Hancock International Airport)
- North Carolina
  - Raleigh-Durham (Raleigh-Durham International Airport)
- Pennsylvania
  - Pittsburgh (Pittsburgh International Airport)
- Rhode Island
  - Providence (T. F. Green Airport)
- Virginia
  - Washington, D.C. area (Ronald Reagan Washington National Airport)

=== Destinations before closure ===
All routes below were operated by Gulfstream.

United States territories

- Puerto Rico
  - San Juan (Luis Muñoz Marín International Airport) (Hub)
- U.S. Virgin Islands
  - St. Thomas (Cyril E. King Airport)
  - Saint Croix (Henry E. Rohlsen International Airport)

Netherlands Antilles

- Saint Martin (Princess Juliana International Airport)

Saint Kitts and Nevis

- Saint Kitts (Robert L. Bradshaw International Airport)

British Virgin Islands

- Tortola (Terrance B. Lettsome International Airport)
- Virgin Gorda (Virgin Gorda Airport)

== See also ==
- Trans World Express
- List of defunct airlines of the United States
