= Muskegon County Airport =

Airport in Michigan, US

- IATA: MKG; ICAO: KMKG; FAA LID: MKG

Summary
- Airport type: Public
- Owner/Operator: Muskegon County
- Serves: Muskegon, Michigan; USA
- Location: Norton Shores, Michigan
- Elevation AMSL: 628 ft (191 m)
- Coordinates: 43°10′04″N 086°14′08″W
- Website: flymkg.com

Map
- Location of airport in Michigan MKG (the United States)

Runways
Direction	Length		Surface
Direction	ft	m	Surface
6/24	6,501	1,982	Asphalt
14/32	6,100	1,859	Asphalt

Statistics (2022)
- Total passengers: 10,728 ▲5.40%
- Aircraft operations: 25,802 ▲7.90%
- Based aircraft: 84 ▲5%
- Sources: FAA, Michigan DOT

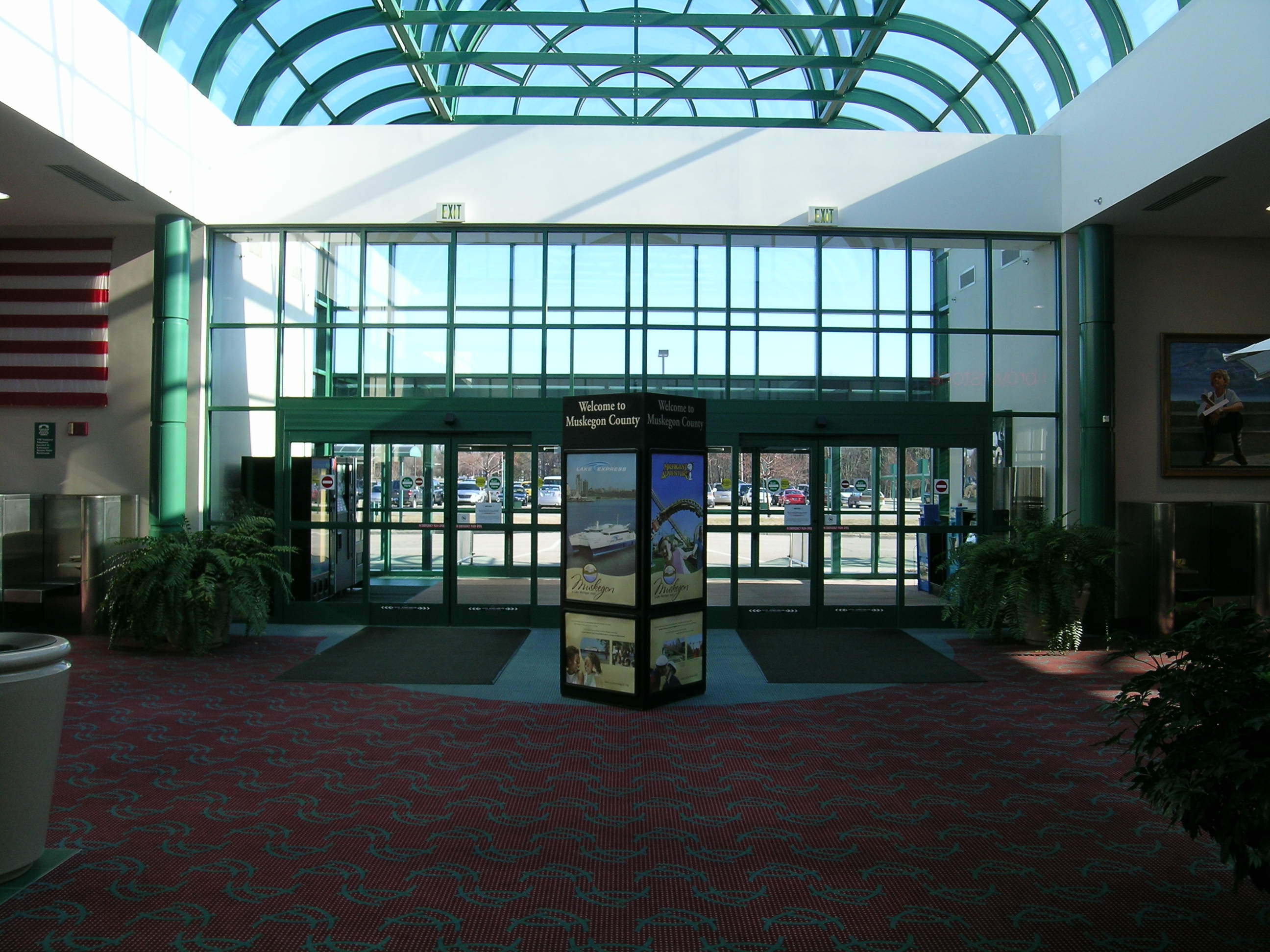
Terminal building interior

Muskegon County Airport (IATA: MKG, ICAO: KMKG, FAA LID: MKG) is a county-owned, public-use airport in Norton Shores, Michigan. The airport is located four nautical miles (5 mi, 7 km) south of the central business district of Muskegon, Michigan. It is mostly used for general aviation but also offers scheduled passenger service by Denver Air Connection flying primarily Embraer ERJ-145 regional jets to Chicago-O'Hare, subsidized by the Essential Air Service program.

As per the Federal Aviation Administration, this airport had 30,051 passenger boardings (enplanements) in calendar year 2008, 15,886 in 2009, and 13,088 in 2010. It is included in the Federal Aviation Administration (FAA) National Plan of Integrated Airport Systems for 2017–2021, in which it is categorized as a non-hub primary commercial service facility.

== History ==
In 1927, the Greater Muskegon Chamber of Commerce began a campaign to establish the Muskegon County Airport. The Muskegon County Board of Commissioners approved the construction of the airport's first terminal in 1931. The Works Progress Administration (WPA) project cost the county $12,000.

Capital Airlines was serving Muskegon by 1949 with nonstop Douglas DC-3 flights to Chicago, Milwaukee and Grand Rapids, Michigan, with direct, no-change-of-plane DC-3 service to Detroit, Lansing and Flint, Michigan. By the spring of 1961, Capital was serving the airport with Vickers Viscount turboprop aircraft with nonstop and direct one stop flights to Chicago O'Hare Airport as well as nonstop flights to Milwaukee with direct, no change of plane Viscount flights from both New York Newark Airport and Washington, D.C. National Airport via Detroit. At this same time, Capital was also operating Douglas DC-4 propliner service on an eastbound routing of Chicago O'Hare - Muskegon - Lansing - Detroit - Cleveland - Pittsburgh - Baltimore - Washington D.C. National Airport and a westbound routing of Washington D.C National Airport - Baltimore - Pittsburgh - Cleveland - Detroit - Grand Rapids - Muskegon - Chicago O'Hare.

North Central Airlines was serving Muskegon by 1962 with Douglas DC-3 aircraft operated on nonstop flights to Milwaukee and Green Bay, Wisconsin, in addition to direct, no change plane flights to Detroit Willow Run Airport via stops in Grand Rapids, Michigan, and Lansing. The airport even had international service of a sort at this time as North Central was operating a daily southbound DC-3 flight from Port Arthur, Ontario/Fort William, Ontario (now Thunder Bay) in Canada with stops being made in Houghton, Michigan, Iron Mountain, Michigan, and Green Bay en route to Muskegon with this flight then continuing on to Grand Rapids, Lansing and Detroit.

Capital Airlines was then acquired and merged into United Airlines which in 1963 was continuing to serve Muskegon. According to the August 1963 United system timetable, the airline was serving the airport with Vickers Viscount turboprops as well as Douglas DC-6B prop aircraft with Viscount service including a westbound flight operating a routing of Washington D.C. National Airport - Detroit Willow Run Airport - Lansing - Grand Rapids - Muskegon - Chicago O'Hare Airport and an eastbound Viscount flight operating a routing of Chicago O'Hare - Muskegon - Saginaw, MI - Flint - Detroit Willow Run Airport - Cleveland - Pittsburgh. United Douglas DC-6B service at this time in 1963 included a westbound flight operating a routing of Detroit Willow Run - Flint - Saginaw - Muskegon - Chicago O'Hare - Moline, IL - Cedar Rapids - Des Moines - Omaha and an eastbound flight operating a routing of Cedar Rapids - Chicago O'Hare - Muskegon - Saginaw - Flint - Detroit Willow Run - Akron, OH - Youngstown, OH - Pittsburgh.

By 1969, United Airlines was operating all of its flights into Muskegon with Boeing 737-200 jets with three daily nonstops to Chicago O'Hare with one of these flights providing direct, no change of plane service to Omaha and Lincoln, Nebraska, with another 737 flight operating direct one stop service from Cleveland via Flint. Also in 1969, North Central Airlines was operating eight daily Convair 580 turboprop flights from the airport with nonstop service to Grand Rapids, Lansing and Milwaukee as well as direct one stop service to Chicago O'Hare and also direct one or two stop service to Detroit.

According to the Official Airline Guide (OAG), United was continuing to serve the airport in 1975 with three daily flights operated with Boeing 737-200 jets with one service operating an eastbound routing of Chicago O'Hare Airport - Muskegon - Flint, MI - Cleveland - Baltimore with another service operating a westbound routing of Boston - Cleveland - Flint - Muskegon - Chicago O'Hare Airport with a third flight operating an additional nonstop service to Chicago O'Hare. Another airline operating jet service into the airport in 1975 was North Central operating McDonnell Douglas DC-9-30 service with one daily flight operated on an eastbound routing of Chicago O'Hare Airport - Milwaukee - Muskegon - Lansing - Detroit - Cleveland although most of the service operated by North Central from the airport at this time was flown with Convair 580 turboprops with four daily direct one stop flights to Chicago O'Hare via Milwaukee, three daily direct one stop flights to Detroit via Lansing and two daily direct flights to Cleveland via stops in Lansing and Detroit. According to the OAG, United was still operating its mainline 737 jet service from Chicago (ORD) at the end of 1979 with only one daily nonstop flight; however, United then ceased serving Muskegon shortly thereafter.

In the spring of 1981, Midstate Airlines, an independent commuter air carrier, was operating seven nonstop flights every weekday to Chicago O'Hare from Muskegon flown with Fairchild Swearingen Metroliner commuter propjets. By early 1985, three independent airlines were flying nonstop service from Chicago O'Hare to the airport including Air Wisconsin operating four flights every weekday with de Havilland Canada DHC-7 Dash 7 turboprops, Midstate Airlines operating six flights every weekday with Fairchild Swearingen Metroliners and Simmons Airlines operating four flights every weekday with NAMC YS-11 and Short 360 turboprops for a combined total of fourteen flights from O'Hare every weekday. At this same time in 1985, Air Wisconsin was operating nonstop DHC-7 Dash 7 service from Battle Creek, Michigan, while Midstate was operating nonstop Metroliner service from Milwaukee and Traverse City with Simmons Airlines operating nonstop and direct Embraer EMB-110 Bandeirante turboprop flights from Detroit as well as nonstop NAMC YS-11 and Short 360 service from Traverse City in addition to nonstop Embraer EMB-110 or Short 360 flights from Flint, Grand Rapids and Jackson, Michigan. According to the OAG, these four air carriers were operating a combined total of 35 flights every weekday into the airport at this time in 1985. The June 1, 1999 OAG lists four nonstop flights to Chicago O'Hare operated every weekday by Great Lakes Airlines flying as United Express via a code sharing agreement on behalf of United with Beechcraft 1900 and Embraer EMB-120 Brasilia commuter propjets as well as five nonstop flights to Detroit every weekday operated by Mesaba Airlines with Saab 340 turboprops as Northwest Airlink code sharing service on behalf of Northwest Airlines and also three nonstop flights every weekday to Milwaukee operated by Skyway Airlines with Beechcraft 1900s flying Midwest Express Connection service on behalf of Midwest Express. Airline service to Chicago then ended in 2002.

North Central Airlines subsequently merged with Southern Airways to form Republic Airlines which in 1979 was continuing to serve the airport with McDonnell Douglas DC-9-30 jets as well as Douglas DC-9-10 jets and McDonnell Douglas DC-9-50 jets in addition to Convair 580 turboprops with direct, no change of plane DC-9-30 service from Atlanta, direct one stop DC-9 and Convair 580 service from Chicago O'Hare via Milwaukee, and direct one stop DC-9 and Convair 580 service from Detroit via either Grand Rapids, Michigan, or Lansing. Republic continued to serve Muskegon during the early 1980s with its flights in 1981 including direct, no change of plane DC-9 jet service to Baltimore, Miami, Nashville and Orlando as well as direct, no change of plane DC-9 jet service from Memphis, Montreal and New Orleans in addition to direct one stop DC-9 jet flights to Chicago O'Hare via Milwaukee plus nonstop and one stop DC-9 jets to Detroit. However, Republic was no longer serving the airport by the spring of 1984.

According to the OAG, four airlines were serving Muskegon in late 1989 including American Eagle operating five daily nonstops from Chicago O'Hare with Short 360 turboprops on behalf of American Airlines via a code sharing agreement, Midwest Express Connection operated by Skyway Airlines with service on behalf of Midwest Express (which subsequently changed its name to Midwest Airlines) with four nonstops every weekday from Milwaukee flown with Beechcraft 1900 commuter propjets, Midway Connection operating on behalf of Midway Airlines (1976–1991) with five nonstops every weekday from Chicago Midway Airport flown with Dornier 228 commuter turboprops, and Northwest Airlink operated by Mesaba Airlines on behalf of Northwest Airlines via a code sharing agreement with three nonstops every weekday from Detroit flown with Fairchild Swearingen Metroliner commuter turboprops. By the spring of 1995, three airlines were serving the airport including American Eagle operating four daily nonstops from Chicago O'Hare with Saab 340 turboprops, Midwest Express Connection flying Beechcraft 1900s with three nonstops operated every weekday from Milwaukee plus one nonstop flown every weekday from both Flint and Lansing, and Northwest Airlink operated by Mesaba Airlines with five nonstops every weekday from Detroit flown with Metroliners. In 2005, Northwest Airlink operated by Mesaba was operating three daily nonstop flights to Detroit with Saab 340s while Midwest Connect (which was formerly Midwest Express Connection) operated by Skyway Airlines was flying four nonstops every weekday to Milwaukee with Beechcraft 1900s.

Muskegon County Airport was the recipient of both the 2007-2008 and 2008-2009 Balchen/Post Awards for outstanding achievement in snow and ice control in the small commercial service airport category.

Midwest Connect, operating code sharing service on behalf of Midwest Airlines, discontinued service to Milwaukee (MKE), effective September 2008. Also in September, the airport was awarded a $650,000 federal Small Community Air Service grant to restore nonstop flights to Chicago O'Hare International Airport. On July 15, 2009, Mesaba Airlines petitioned the DOT for federal Essential Air Service (EAS) subsidies to continue operating scheduled passenger service into Muskegon as well as seven other communities. Per DOT procedure, bids were opened for proposals for passenger service to these cities by all interested air carriers. For Muskegon, SkyWest Airlines submitted a bid to provide service to Chicago which required less than half the annual subsidy that Mesaba had proposed in order to continue its service to Detroit. SkyWest was selected in November 2009, and began service on February 12, 2010, replacing Mesaba. SkyWest initially operated under a two-year contract for the service and was operating flights to Chicago O'Hare with Canadair CRJ200 regional jets operating as United Express on behalf of United Airlines via a code sharing agreement; however, SkyWest then ended all United Express service to Muskegon.

The airport hosted an air show called the Muskegon Air Fair until 2006. Due to budget deficits, the air fair was placed on hiatus for the summer of 2007, but had been reinstated during Muskegon's Summer Celebration. However, as of 2011, the air show was then indefinitely canceled due to additional financial losses. In 2023, a new air show, Wings Over Muskegon, was presented by Yankee Air Museum and hosted by the airport. It was significantly smaller than previous shows.

Delta Connection, operated by Mesaba Airlines with code sharing service on behalf of Delta Air Lines, flew nonstop to Detroit until United Express began flights to Chicago with passenger counts to Detroit then decreasing resulting in Delta Connection ceasing all service to Muskegon.

In March of 2022, SkyWest announced that it would soon be ending service to Muskegon. On October 1, 2022, Southern Airways Express announced service between Muskegon and Chicago O'Hare. Southern Airlines was operating the Cessna 208 Caravan turboprop on this route and proposed offering more flights out of Muskegon; however, this airline no longer serves the airport.

On October 1, 2024, Muskegon County Airport announced that Denver Air Connection would be taking over the Essential Air Service (EAS) contract to Muskegon effective November 1, 2024. Denver Air Connection announced it would operate 24 weekly departures to and from Chicago O'Hare (ORD) with Embraer ERJ-145 regional jet aircraft.

In 2026, Denver Air Connection opened a maintenance base in Muskegon to cover a number of midwest operations.

== Facilities and aircraft ==
The airport covers 1,200 acres (486 ha) at an elevation of 629 feet (192 m). It has two asphalt runways: 6/24 is 6,501 by 150 feet (1,982 x 46 m) and 14/32 is 6,100 by 150 feet (1,859 x 46 m).

In 2021 the airport had 23,000 aircraft operations, average 63 per day: 84% general aviation, 14% scheduled commercial, 1% military and <1% air taxi. 81 aircraft were then based at the airport: 57 single-engine and 16 multi-engine, 5 jet, 2 helicopters, and 1% military.

The airport has a fixed-base operator (FBO), Executive Air Transport, which provides fuel and other pilot services. Car rental agencies are available. The Muskegon Area Transit System (MATS) route Harvey is the bus service.

== Airlines and destinations ==
Denver Air Connection is the only airline serving the airport at the present time with nonstop Embraer ERJ-145 regional jet service to Chicago O'Hare Airport (ORD). It has interline relationships with American Airlines, Delta Air Lines and United Airlines.

Airlines	Destinations
Denver Air Connection	Chicago–O'Hare; Seasonal: Orlando/Sanford (begins January 7, 2027)

=== Statistics ===
Top domestic destinations (January 2025 – December 2025)
Rank	Airport	Passengers	Airline
1	Chicago–O'Hare International (ORD)	6,920	Denver Air Connection

== Accidents and incidents ==
- On June 30, 1981, a Cessna 401 crashed while on its initial climbout from Muskegon. The probable cause was found to be a powerplant failure during climb for unknown reasons. The pilot's improper emergency procedures contributed to the accident.
- On July 24, 2010, a Beechcraft A24R Sierra lost engine power and impacted terrain after departing from Muskegon. The pilot, who was seriously injured in the crash, reported his fuel system checks and engine run-up were normal. The aircraft started losing power about 200 feet above the ground, and the pilot decided not to return to the airport due to his low altitude. The cause of the loss of engine power was undetermined.

== Photo gallery ==
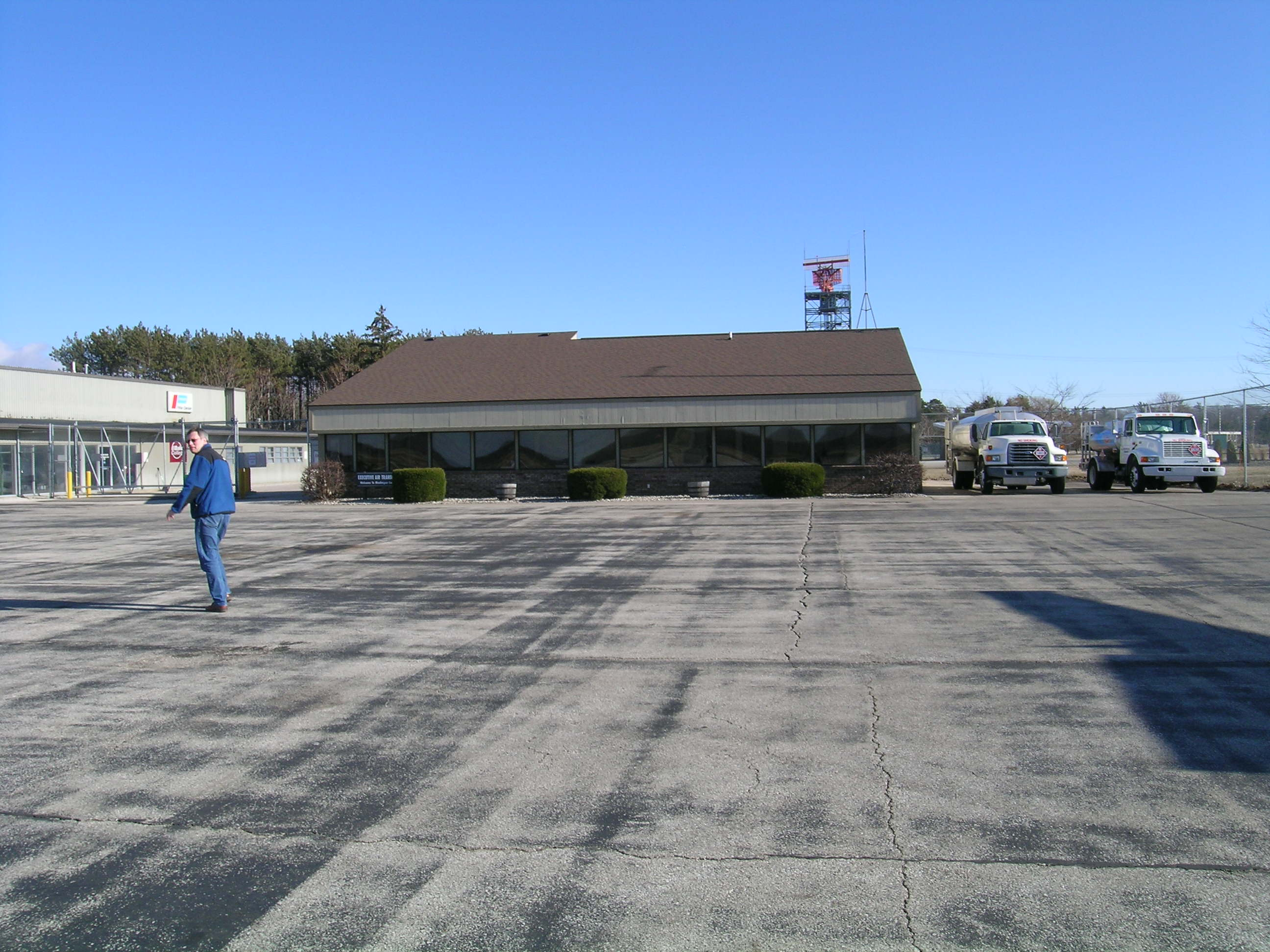
Executive Air ramp

FAA airport diagram

== See also ==
- List of airports in Michigan

== Other sources ==
- Essential Air Service documents (Docket DOT-OST-2009-0160) from the U.S. Department of Transportation:
  - Ninety-day notice (July 15, 2009): from Mesaba Aviation, Inc. of its intent to discontinue unsubsidized scheduled air service at the following communities, effective October 12, 2009: Paducah, KY; Alpena, MI; Muskegon, MI; Hancock, MI; Sault Ste. Marie, MI; International Falls, MN; Tupelo, MS and Eau Claire, WI.
- Essential Air Service documents (Docket OST-2009-0301) from the U.S. Department of Transportation:
  - Memorandum (November 19, 2009): closing out docket DOT-2009-0160 and opening up eight new dockets for the various communities (Alpena, MI; Eau Claire, WI; Hancock/Houghton, MI; International Falls, MN; Muskegon, MI; Paducah, KY; Sault Ste. Marie, MI; Tupelo, MS).
  - Order 2009-10-8 (October 16, 2009): selecting SkyWest Airlines, Inc., d/b/a United Express, to provide subsidized essential air service (EAS) at Hancock/Houghton and Muskegon, Michigan, Paducah, Kentucky, and Eau Claire, Wisconsin.
  - Order 2012-1-24 (January 26, 2012): tentatively re-selecting SkyWest Airlines, Inc. to provide Essential Air Service (EAS) with subsidy rates as follows: Eau Claire, Wisconsin, $1,733,576; Hancock/Houghton, Michigan, $934,156; Muskegon, Michigan, $1,576,067; and Paducah, Kentucky, $1,710,775.
  - Order 2012-2-2 (February 1, 2012): makes final the selection of SkyWest Airlines, Inc., to provide Essential Air Service at Eau Claire, Wisconsin; Hancock/Houghton, Michigan; and Paducah, Kentucky (at Muskegon, the selection of SkyWest was not finalized at this time).
  - Order 2012-2-11 (February 15, 2012): makes final the selection of SkyWest Airlines, Inc., to provide Essential Air Service at Muskegon, Michigan.
  - Order 2013-10-8 (October 21, 2013): reselecting Delta Air Lines, Inc., to provide Essential Air Service (EAS) at Pellston and Sault Ste. Marie, Michigan; and SkyWest Airlines, at Paducah, Kentucky; Hancock/Houghton, and Muskegon, Michigan; and Eau Claire, Wisconsin. The Order also tentatively reselects American Airlines, at Watertown, New York. Muskegon, Michigan: Docket 2009-0301; effective Period: January 1, 2014, through January 31, 2016; Service: Fourteen (14) nonstop round trips per week to Chicago O'Hare (ORD); Aircraft Type: CRJ-200; Annual Subsidy: $1,389,952.
