= Skyway Airlines =

American airline services company (1994–2008)

IATA	ICAO	Call sign
AL	SYX	SKYWAY-EX
- Founded: 1994; 32 years ago
- Ceased operations: April 2008; 17 years ago
- Hubs: General Mitchell International Airport
- Frequent-flyer program: Midwest Miles
- Fleet size: 16
- Destinations: 19
- Parent company: TPG Capital / Midwest Air Group
- Headquarters: Oak Creek, Wisconsin
- Key people: Leo Malloy — President
- Website: midwestairlines.com (defunct)

Skyway Airlines was an American ramp and aircraft ground handling services and catering company based in Oak Creek, Wisconsin. Until April 5, 2008, it operated as a regional airline and banner carrier exclusively for Midwest Express Airlines (which subsequently changed its name to Midwest Airlines) under the business name Midwest Connect (previously Midwest Express Connection), feeding Midwest's hub at General Mitchell International Airport with twelve 32-seat Fairchild Dornier 328JET regional jet aircraft, and four 19-seat Beechcraft 1900 commuter turboprops. Skyway Airlines, along with its parent corporation, Midwest Air Group, has since ceased operations.

== History ==
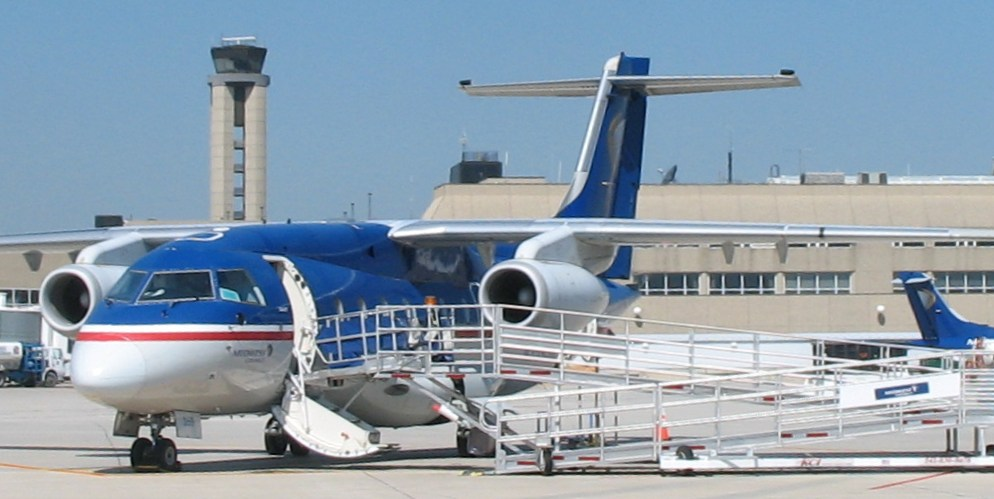
A Skyway Airlines Fairchild Dornier 328JET painted in the colors of Midwest Connect at General Mitchell International Airport in Milwaukee, WI. SkyWest Airlines aircraft operated under contract to Midwest.

Skyway Airlines, operating as the Midwest Express Connection, began flight operations on April 17, 1989.

Skyway began operations as a division of Phoenix, Arizona-based Mesa Air Group. Mesa's Skyway Airlines division operated Beechcraft 1900C 19-passenger airliners, providing regional airline feed to Midwest Express Airlines in Milwaukee, Wisconsin and Rockford, Illinois.

In 1994, Midwest Express established Astral Aviation, Inc., as a wholly owned subsidiary to take over the operation of Skyway Airlines. The Beech 1900C aircraft were replaced with 15 brand-new Beech 1900D aircraft. The first flight took place from Milwaukee to Flint, Michigan, on February 15, 1994. Skyway grew to connect Milwaukee with communities in Wisconsin, Michigan, Illinois, Iowa, Indiana, Ohio, Nebraska, Missouri, Arkansas, Tennessee, Kentucky, and Toronto, Ontario, Canada.

In 1999, Skyway became the world launch customer for the Fairchild Dornier 328JET aircraft, a 32-seat jet. It ultimately acquired 12 328JETs. The 328JETs allowed Skyway to provide new service to cities as far as Hartford, New York City, Washington, D.C., and Raleigh-Durham, and to provide more comfortable passenger accommodations on routes previously served by the Beechcraft 1900. Skyway planned to transition to an all-jet fleet by obtaining additional 328JET aircraft, purchasing German manufacturer Fairchild Dornier's planned 44-seat version, known as the 428JET, and phasing out the Beechcraft 1900.

While the September 11 attacks severely impacted all U.S. airlines, other events brought about the end of Skyway Airlines. Skyway's plans to continue modernizing its fleet with additional Dornier aircraft unwound when Dornier failed, and parent company Midwest Air Group's financial problems caused it to end Skyway's flight operations.

In 2002, Dornier, an aviation pioneer dating back to the 1930s, became insolvent. Production of the 328JET stopped. This interrupted Skyway's plans to further expand its jet fleet and replace the Beechcraft 1900. AvCraft Aviation, a Virginia-based parts supplier for the 328 turboprop and the 328JET, purchased the production rights for the 328JET from Fairchild Dornier's receivers, and planned to re-establish production of the type. Then AvCraft went bankrupt. This made further growth of the 328JET fleet effectively impossible.

The other regional jets built by Canadair and Embraer had substantial order backlogs, and the training, maintenance and inventory costs of running a small airline with three different aircraft types made another jet purchase financially impractical. Without having an available replacement aircraft, Skyway began to draw down its Beechcraft 1900 fleet, planning to eventually eliminate that fleet.

In March 2003, Midwest Express Airlines reincorporated and changed its name to Midwest Airlines. Astral Aviation, Inc., d/b/a Skyway Airlines also reincorporated and changed its name, to Skyway Airlines, Inc., d/b/a Midwest Connect. New logos were designed for both airlines' aircraft and uniforms, and the connection between Midwest Airlines and Midwest Connect was made more obvious for marketing purposes.

In 2006, Midwest Airlines announced that it would obtain additional regional feed from SkyWest Airlines, an independently owned airline based in St. George, Utah which operated Canadair regional jets. The SkyWest aircraft would also bear the name "Midwest Connect." Midwest announced that it would operate the SkyWest and Skyway operations side by side.

In 2006 and 2007, Midwest Air Group also fought off a hostile takeover attempt by rival airline AirTran Airways. Midwest Air Group's leadership persuaded Northwest Airlines and private equity firm TPG Capital to enter the bidding as a white knight. Northwest and TPG purchased Midwest Air Group, with 47% and 53% ownership stakes, respectively.

Following the Northwest Airlines/TPG purchase, Midwest announced on January 16, 2008, that it would terminate all Skyway Airlines flight operations and transfer the remaining Midwest Connect flying to SkyWest. Midwest also discussed a potential contract with Great Lakes Airlines to provide code-share feed to the Essential Air Service cities they would serve from Milwaukee. The Skyway subsidiary would remain as a ramp services and catering company for Midwest Airlines and for certain (SkyWest) Midwest Connect operations.

Skyway's last day of flight operations was April 5, 2008. On the last day of flight operations, Skyway Airlines operated 12 328JETs and 4 Beechcraft 1900D aircraft. The last 328JET flight operated from Indianapolis to Milwaukee. The last Beech flight operated a round-robin from Milwaukee to Muskegon and Manistee, Michigan, and back to Milwaukee.

Midwest, already in a financially weakened condition following the September 11, 2001 attacks and the aforementioned takeover battle, suffered another severe financial blow as a result of the 2008 fuel price spike. Midwest's fleet of MD-80 airliners had been well suited to its markets and Midwest's high-service business model during the 1990s, but by 2008 it was no longer fuel efficient as compared with newer aircraft designs. Midwest terminated the leases on those aircraft and returned them to their lessors. Shortly thereafter, as the result of a failed lease renegotiation with Boeing, Midwest also lost the leases on 16 of its 25 newer Boeing 717 aircraft, leaving the airline with only 9 of the 38 aircraft with which it had started the year.

On September 3, 2008, Skyway's parent Midwest Airlines announced an agreement to transfer most of its mainline flight operations to another independent regional airline, Republic Airways. Republic agreed to operate 12 76-seat Embraer 170 jets under the Midwest Connect name and provide Midwest $20 million in financing. As a result, Midwest furloughed 269 of its 399 pilots and total employee cuts for the year were approximately 1,850.

On February 2, 2009, Midwest Air Group CEO Tim Hoeksema announced in an internal corporate memorandum that all remaining Skyway functions will be assumed by Midwest Airlines, and that Skyway will cease to exist as a separate entity. No end date for Skyway operations had been announced. It remains unclear if Skyway had been fully integrated into Midwest prior to Republic Airways' acquisition of Midwest from TPG.

== Destinations ==
At the end of flight operations, Skyway Airlines flew to 19 destinations in Canada and the United States. The airline's hub was at Milwaukee's General Mitchell International Airport. Most destinations were taken over by SkyWest on April 6, 2008. The remaining few (part of the Essential Air Service program) saw a termination of service.

Historically, approximately 60 markets were served at one time by Skyway Airlines. Most destinations were served nonstop from Milwaukee; however, some point-to-point services were also operated. Many of these were served in the era when Mesa Airlines operated Skyway, choosing to focus resources outside of the Midwest Express hub in Milwaukee.

Markets denoted with * were served by Skyway at or shortly before shutdown.

Markets denoted with + were served exclusively in the early 1990s by Mesa Airlines operating as Skyway.

Arkansas

- Little Rock (to Kansas City)

Connecticut

- Hartford*

Illinois

Bloomington (to Detroit+)

Chicago Midway (to Milwaukee and Louisville+)

Moline (to Milwaukee and Kansas City)

Peoria (to Detroit+)

Rockford (to Milwaukee, Detroit, and St Louis]

Indiana

Anderson (to Flint+)

Fort Wayne

Indianapolis*

Kokomo (to Flint+)

South Bend (to Milwaukee and Dayton)

Iowa

Cedar Rapids (to Milwaukee* and Omaha+)

Des Moines*

Kentucky

Louisville* (to Milwaukee* and Chicago Midway+)

Maryland

Baltimore (to Milwaukee and Columbus+)

Michigan

Detroit City Airport (to Milwaukee+ and Cleveland Burke Lakefront Airport+)

Detroit Metro Airport (to Bloomington+, Peoria+ and Rockford+)

Escanaba*

Flint* (to Milwaukee*, Rochester+, Kokomo+ and Anderson+)

Grand Rapids* (to Milwaukee*, Toronto, Columbus, Dayton, New York LaGuardia, and Washington Reagan National)

Ironwood* (to Milwaukee* via Rhinelander)

Iron Mountain*

Kalamazoo

Lansing

Manistee*

Marquette*

Muskegon*

Saginaw

Traverse City

Minnesota

Duluth*

Minneapolis*

Missouri

Kansas City (to Little Rock, Moline and Omaha)

St Louis* (to Milwaukee* and Rockford)

Nebraska

Omaha* (to Milwaukee*, Kansas City and Cedar Rapids+)

New Jersey

Newark

New York

Buffalo (to Columbus+)

New York LaGuardia (to Grand Rapids)

Rochester (to Columbus+ and Flint+)

North Carolina

Raleigh/Durham

Ohio

Cincinnati

Cleveland Burke Lakefront Airport (to Detroit City Airport+)

Cleveland Hopkins Airport*

Columbus* (to Milwaukee*, Grand Rapids, Baltimore+, Buffalo+, and Rochester+)

Dayton* (to Milwaukee*, Grand Rapids, Nashville and South Bend)

Ontario, Canada

- Toronto* (to Milwaukee* and Grand Rapids)

Pennsylvania

- Philadelphia
- Pittsburgh*

Tennessee

- Nashville* (to Milwaukee* and Dayton)

Virginia / District of Columbia

- Washington Dulles
- Washington Reagan National Airport (to Grand Rapids)

Wisconsin

Appleton*

Eau Claire (to Milwaukee+ via Wausau/Central Wisconsin Airport)

Green Bay*

La Crosse

Madison*

Milwaukee*

Oshkosh+

Rhinelander*

Wausau/Central Wisconsin Airport*

Some markets listed also were served by Midwest Express / Midwest Airlines mainline service.

Most non-Milwaukee markets did not last more than 6–18 months.

== Fleet ==
As of April 5, 2008, the Skyway Airlines fleet included 16 aircraft:

Skyway Airlines Fleet
Aircraft	Total	Passengers (Economy)	Routes	Notes
Beechcraft 1900	4	19	Commuter	All operated as Midwest Connect
Fairchild Dornier 328JET	12	32	Regional	All operated as Midwest Connect

- All Skyway/Midwest Connect aircraft featured leather seating with the Fairchild Dornier 328JET aircraft featuring freshly baked cookies as well on select routes.

== See also ==
- List of defunct airlines of the United States
