= John Ruan =

John Ruan may refer to:

- John Ruan (businessman) (1914–2010), founder of Ruan Companies and contributor to the World Food Prize
- John Ruan (politician) (1813–1892), member of the Wisconsin State Assembly
