= Timothy E. Hoeksema =

Timothy E. Hoeksema (born January 25, 1947) was the chairman of Midwest Air Group who transformed the air fleet of the Kimberly Clark paper mill company into Midwest Airlines. He retired in July 2009 after the company was sold to Republic Airways Holdings after running into financial trouble.

Hoeksema was a flight instructor at the University of Illinois at Urbana-Champaign in 1968. Hoeksema joined Kimberly-Clark in 1969 serving as first officer of the company's air fleet—the same year that Kimberly-Clark started its K-C Aviation subsidiary. He graduated summa cum laude from Western Michigan University in 1972 with a Bachelor of Science in aviation engineering technology.

In 1974, he became chief pilot for Kimberly-Clark. In 1977, after receiving a master's degree in business administration while on a Kimberly-Clark scholarship to the University of Chicago Executive Program, he was named director of air transportation for the company and president of K-C Aviation.

In 1984, he was responsible for transforming K-C Aviation into a commercial company Midwest Express which started out with two DC-9 planes.

In 1988, he was named head of Kimberly Clark's transportation sector.

In 1995, the airline's parent Midwest Airgroup was listed on the American Stock Exchange.

In 2007-2008, he fought a takeover attempt by AirTran Airlines in the "Save the Cookie" campaign (a take off on the company's signature service of providing on board baked chocolate chip cookies to its passengers) before ultimately agreeing to a private takeover from a consortium led by TPG Capital with a minority investment by Northwest Airlines. He remained the chief executive of the airline under its new owners. TPG bought the company for $452 million in 2008 and sold it in July 2009.

He is also a director at the Marcus Corporation and is on the board of trustees of the Medical College of Wisconsin.
