= Luke Scanlan =

American politician

Luke Scanlan (October 16, 1841 – April 5, 1915) was an American farmer and politician.

Born near Lockport, Illinois, Scanlan moved with his parents to Milwaukee County, Wisconsin Territory in 1842 and settled on a farm in the Town of Oak Creek. During the American Civil War, Scanlan served in the 12th Wisconsin Volunteer Infantry Regiment. Scanlan served as chairman of the Town of Oak Creek Board and on the Milwaukee County Board of Supervisors. In 1913, Scanlan served in the Wisconsin State Assembly and was a Democrat. Because of ill health, Scanlan did not run for re-election to the Wisconsin State Assembly. Scanlan died of cancer at his home in Oak Creek, Wisconsin.
