= Midwest Connect =

American commercial airline (1994–2010)

- Founded: 1994; 32 years ago Kearney, Nebraska
- Ceased operations: November 2010; 15 years ago (merged with Frontier Airlines)
- Hubs: Milwaukee
- Frequent-flyer program: Midwest Miles
- Fleet size: 13
- Destinations: 17
- Parent company: Republic Airways Holdings
- Headquarters: Oak Creek, Wisconsin
- Key people: Leo Malloy - President
- Website: midwestairlines.com (defunct)

Midwest Connect (formerly Midwest Express Connection) was the brand name for the regional airline service of Midwest Airlines, rather than a certificated airline carrier. Skyway Airlines was the sole operator of Midwest Connect since its inception in 1989, until SkyWest Airlines began additional Midwest Connect service on April 1, 2007. SkyWest took over all Midwest Connect operations following Skyway's shutdown of operations on April 5, 2008. In October 2008, Republic Airways also began operating for Midwest Connect. On November 3, 2009, the Embraer 170 and Embraer 190 operated by Republic Airways were rebranded as Midwest Airlines operated by Republic Airways. Later, during Midwest's merger with Frontier Airlines under the ownership of Republic, Chautauqua Airlines operated as Midwest Connect.

== Destinations ==
On January 16, 2008, Midwest Airlines announced that it would transition the operation of all Midwest Connect flights from Skyway Airlines to SkyWest Airlines. Skyway's last day of operations was April 5, 2008. Skyway Airlines continued in an airport services role, providing Ramp and Dining Services operations for Midwest Airlines and Midwest Connect, and Customer Service operations in Midwest Connect field stations.

== Fleet ==
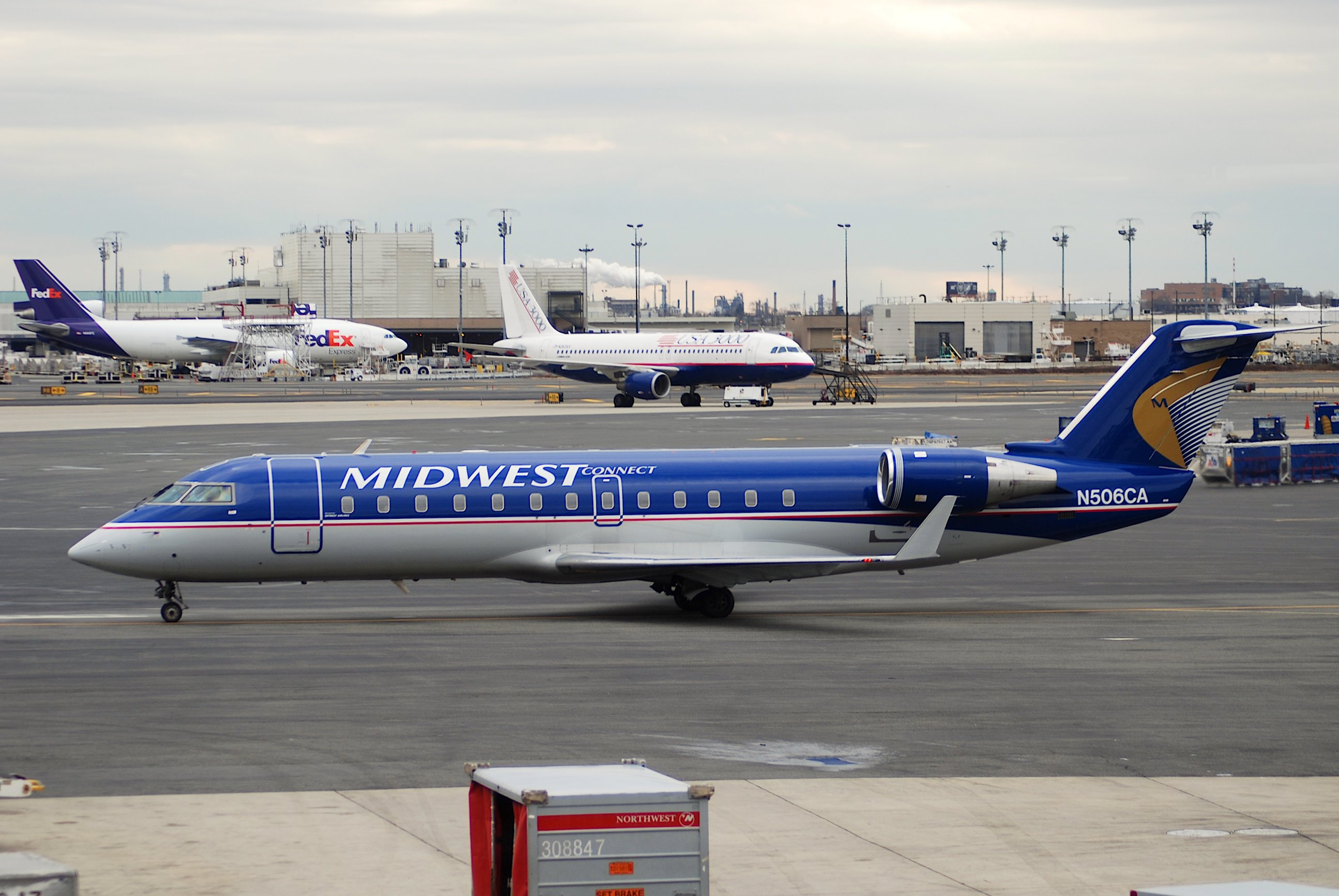
A Midwest Connect CRJ200 in the final livery

As of August 2009, the Midwest Connect fleet included 12 aircraft:

Fleet currently branded as Midwest Connect
Aircraft	In service	Passengers			Routes	Notes
Aircraft	In service	F	Y	Total	Routes	Notes
Embraer ERJ-135	6	—	37	37	Domestic	Operated by Chautauqua Airlines
Embraer ERJ-145	7	—	50	50	Domestic	Operated by Chautauqua Airlines

- All Midwest Connect aircraft feature leather seating, and jet aircraft feature freshly baked cookies on select routes.

== Retired fleet ==
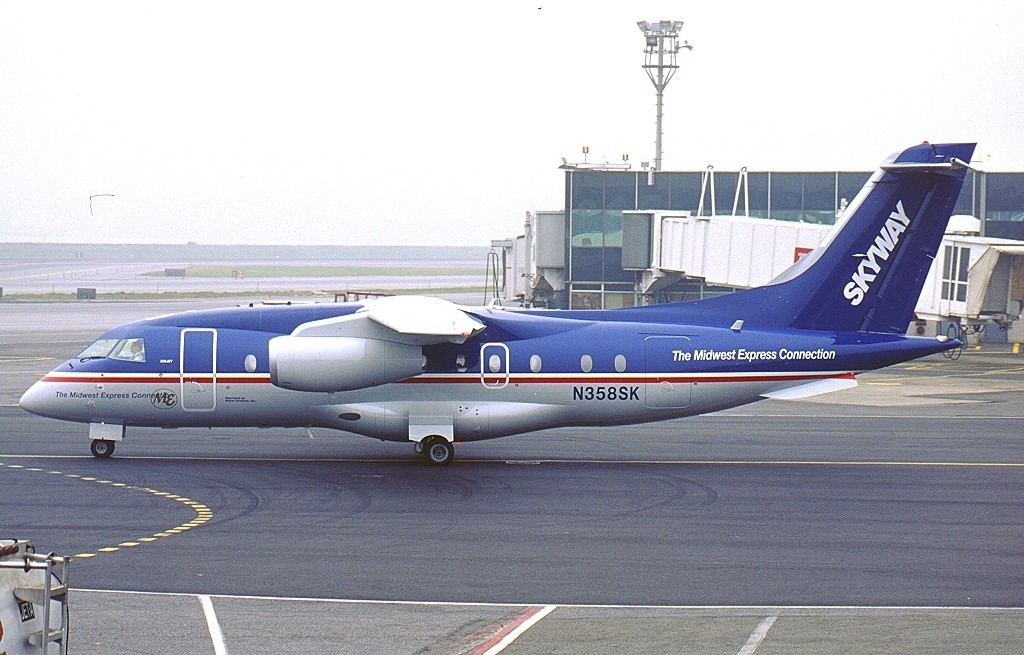
A Midwest Connect Fairchild Dornier 328JET in the old Skyway livery

Aircraft	Total	Passengers (Economy)	Routes	Operator
Beechcraft 1900	4	19	Commuter	Skyway Airlines
Fairchild Dornier 328JET	12	32	Commuter	Skyway Airlines
Canadair Regional Jet 200	12	50	Commuter	SkyWest Airlines

== See also ==
- List of defunct airlines of the United States
