= Midwest Express Airlines Flight 105 =

1985 aviation accident in Wisconsin

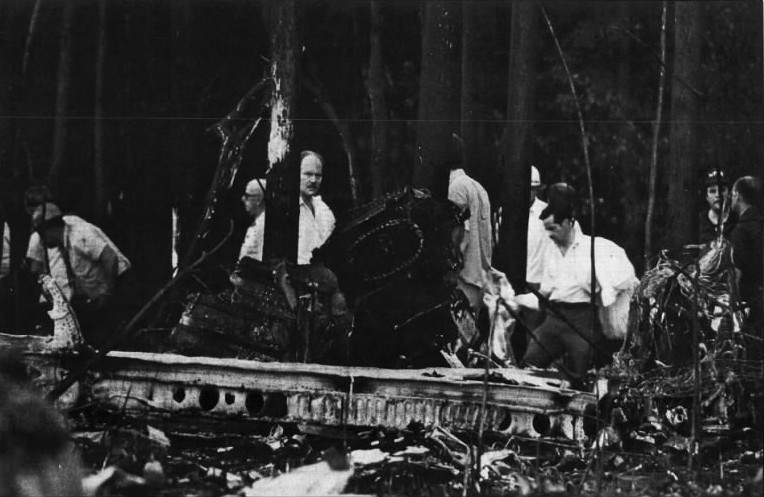
- Wreckage of the aircraft

Accident
- Date: September 6, 1985
- Summary: Uncontained engine failure on takeoff leading to pilot error and loss of control
- Site: Near General Mitchell International Airport, Oak Creek, Wisconsin, United States; 42°55′38″N 87°54′06″W

Aircraft
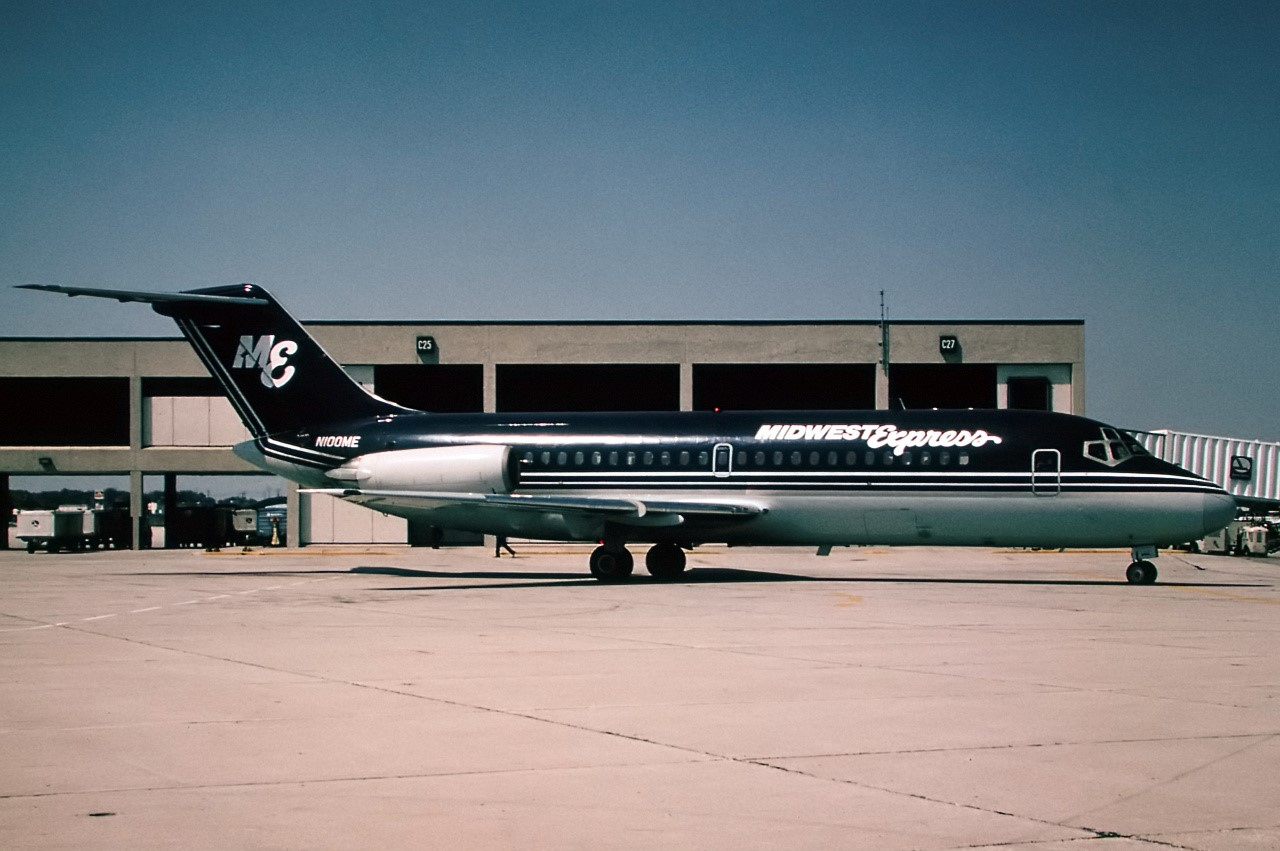
- N100ME, the aircraft involved in the accident, seen in May 1985 in a prior livery
- Aircraft type: McDonnell Douglas DC-9-14
- Operator: Midwest Express Airlines
- IATA flight No.: YX105
- ICAO flight No.: MEP105
- Call sign: MIDEX 105
- Registration: N100ME
- Flight origin: Dane County Regional Airport, Madison, Wisconsin, United States
- Stopover: General Mitchell International Airport, Milwaukee, Wisconsin, United States
- Destination: Hartsfield–Jackson Atlanta International Airport, Atlanta, Georgia, United States
- Occupants: 31
- Passengers: 27
- Crew: 4
- Fatalities: 31
- Survivors: 0

Midwest Express Airlines Flight 105 was a scheduled domestic passenger flight that crashed into an open field in Oak Creek, Wisconsin shortly after taking off from General Mitchell International Airport on September 6, 1985. The airplane, a McDonnell Douglas DC-9, was carrying 31 passengers and crew. None of them survived the crash.

Multiple eyewitnesses reported that the plane was on fire shortly after it took off from the airport. The fire was caused due to a failure on the right engine where one of its removable sleeve spacers detached. The removable sleeve spacer suffered metal fatigue that caused the engine to explode.

The National Transportation Safety Board (NTSB), the investigation team who was responsible for the investigation of the crash, concluded that despite the plane suffering engine failure, it was still controllable, and instead the response of the crew to the failure was the main cause of the accident. The crew failed to properly control the plane during the emergency. Breakdown of the crew's coordination, and poor FAA oversight also contributed to the crash.

== Aircraft ==
On September 6, 1985, Flight 105 was a Midwest Express Airlines flight scheduled to be operated using a McDonnell Douglas DC-9-14 twin-engine, single-aisle jet airliner (registration N100ME). The DC-9 was manufactured in 1968. The aircraft had accrued a total of 31,892 operating hours and 48,903 cycles at the time of the accident.

== Passengers and crew ==
Flight 105 departed Milwaukee carrying 27 passengers and four crew members. Most of the passengers were businessmen.

Instead of a captain and first officer, Flight 105 was crewed by two captains.

The first captain of the flight was 31-year old Danny Watkin Martin. Martin was employed by Midwest Express in 1984 as a first officer. He was promoted to captain in 1985 and had accumulated a total of 5,100 flight hours, including 1,100 hours on the DC-9 (600 flight hours as a first officer on the DC-9, and 500 hours as a captain). Before he was an employee of Midwest, he was a corporate pilot of a Beechcraft 90 King Air.

The second captain (though acting as a first officer) was 37-year old William Roger "Bill" Weiss. Weiss was employed by Midwest Express in 1984 and later received his DC-9 type rating. At the time, he had accrued 5,197 total flight hours, including 1,640 hours on the DC-9 (500 hours as a first officer of the DC-9 and 1,140 hours as a captain). He was a former employee of KC Aviation, the parent company of Midwest Express. Weiss was also a former US Air Force pilot, flying an F-4.

== Flight ==
At 15:20, Flight 105, carrying 27 passengers and four crew members, departed from Mitchell's Runway 19R en route to its destination of Hartsfield–Jackson Atlanta International Airport, Atlanta, Georgia. The plane had previously been operated as Flight 206, with the same flight crew, on its previous leg from Madison.

At 15:21, with Flight 105 just 700 ft (210 m) above the ground and climbing, the right engine exploded, causing Flight 105 to sway several times. Captain Martin immediately asked, "What the hell was that?", to which First Officer Weiss did not respond. Immediately after, ATC instructed Flight 105 to turn left towards heading 175. At this stage, the air traffic controller noticed smoke and flames were emanating from the right engine, with parts of the plane falling to the ground, but did not inform the crew about this. In the cockpit, Captain Martin then asked, "What do we got here Bill?", still with no response from Weiss. Instead, Weiss replied to ATC, advising them that Flight 105 was in an emergency. This would be the only communication from Flight 105 during the crisis.

As this was going on, the plane continued climbing with a high angle of attack, which caused the airspeed to decrease significantly. It began to roll to the right, and then stalled, and abruptly continued rolling to an angle of 90 degrees. The left engine suffered an unknown failure, possibly due to it ingesting parts of the right engine. In its final moments, the plane was reported to have barrel-rolled at least once (likely closer to 2 full rotations), while the CVR recorded the lead flight attendant ordering passengers to get their heads down. At 15.21 and 41 seconds, Flight 105 crashed into an open field in a wildlife preserve several hundred meters from runway 19R. The aircraft was completely destroyed by the impact and post-crash fire.

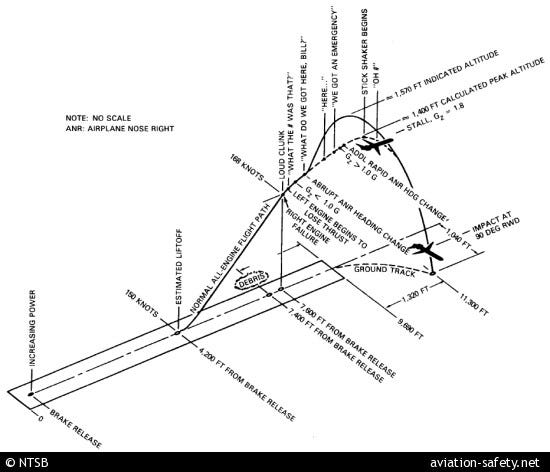
An illustration of flight 105 from the NTSB report, showing the flight path

== CVR Transcript ==
Transcript of Midwest Express flight 105's CVR (Times are expressed in CST)
* = Unintelligible word; () = Questionable text; (()) = Commentary; — = Break in continuity; Shading = Radio communication
smallpx
Time	Source	Content
15:19:15	MEP105 (to MKE tower)	Milwaukee, Midex one-oh-five is ready on nine right
15:19:19	MKE tower (to MEP105)	Midex one-oh-five Milwaukee Tower taxi into position and hold nineteen right, traffic landing two-five-right
15:19:23	MEP105 (to MKE tower)	Position and hold nineteen right, one-oh-five
15:19:27	Captain	Before takeoff checklist
15:19:31	First Officer	Flight Attendant two bells
15:19:31	((Sound of two bells))	
15:19:33	First officer	Transponder on, flaps twenty
15:19:33	Captain	Twenty's checked
15:19:33	First Officer	Annunciation
15:19:36	Captain	Checked
15:19:36	First Officer	Ignition
15:19:36	Captain	(It's Checked)
15:19:36	First Officer	Before takeoff checklist complete
15:19:54	Captain	Corporate jet almost looks like a fighter, doesn't it
15:19:54	First Officer	Yeah
15:20:29	MKE tower (to MEP105)	Midex one-oh-five cleared for takeoff
15:20:30.4	((Sound similar to parking brake release))	
15:20:31	MEP105 (to MKE tower)	Midex one-oh-five
15:20:32.3	Captain	Here we go
15:20:43	((Sound of increasing engine noises))	
15:20:52	Captain	Spooling up
15:20:52	First Officer	* comin' up
15:20:55.7	First Officer	Power normal
15:21:02.4	First Officer	One Hundred
15:21:07.3	First Officer	Vee one
15:21:08.0	First Officer	Rotate
15:21:09.7	((Sound of thump))	
15:21:13.9	First Officer	Positive rate
15:21:14.2	Captain	Gear up
15:21:14.4	((Sound of Gear handle being re-positioned))	
15:21:16	((Sound of Gear door closing))	
15:21:22.3	((Sound of normal spoiler handle mechanism recycling))	
15:21:26.4	((Sound of loud clunk))	
15:21:26.7	((Sound of engine spooling down))	
15:21:27.6	Captain	What the fuck was that?
15:21:29.0	MKE tower (to MEP105)	Midex one-oh-five turn left heading one-seven-five
15:21:29.5	Captain	What do we got here bill?
15:21:33	Captain	Here--
15:21:34.0	MEP105 (to MKE tower)	Midex one-oh-five Roger, Uh we've got a(n) emergency here.
15:21:36.0	((Sound of Stick shaker starts and continues until end of recording))	
15:21:38	Captain	Oh shit!
15:21:38.0	MKE Tower (to MEP105)	Midex one-oh-five Roger
15:21:38.8	((Sound of power interruption to the CVR for 0.1 second))	
15:21:39	Lead Flight attendant	* heads down
15:21:40	Lead Flight attendant	Heads down
15:21:40.8	United 472 (to MKE tower)	Milwaukee tower--
15:21:41	Lead Flight attendant	Heads down
15:21:41.7	Whoo- ((Sound of beginning of first "Whoop" of the Ground Proximity warning system ))	
15:21:41.9		End of recording

== Investigation ==
The NTSB was under intense pressure by the public to determine the cause of the crash, as 1985 was proving a bad year for aviation. Indeed, the Midwest Express crash was, globally, the eighth major aircraft accident to occur that year, as well as the third in the U.S. alone.

Roughly 100 eyewitnesses stated that they saw flames and smoke from the right engine shortly after the explosion and that some parts of the plane detached and fell to the ground. They also stated that loud bangs were continuously heard during the accident. Shortly afterwards, the crew lost control of the plane and the plane crashed into the field. Investigators then constructed several possible scenarios as to what might have caused the plane to lose control.

=== Possible control failure due to turbine explosion ===
Investigators immediately examined the fragments of the engine. They stated that the explosion might have been powerful enough to propel fragments of the turbine with sufficient speed to penetrate the plane and damage the flight controls, which could explain why the plane suddenly pitched up and barrel-rolled immediately after the explosion. Five years before the crash of Flight 105, in Poland an Ilyushin Il-62 crashed into a moat after its number 2 engine exploded and damaged the plane's elevator and aileron. Immediately after the explosion, the plane nosedived to the ground.

The explosion was caused by a detached removable sleeve spacer inside the right engine. The detachment was caused by metal fatigue. Examination of the turbine fragments and their distribution during the explosion led to the conclusion that the ejection of the fragments didn't contribute to the crash, as the velocity of the fragments was substantially absorbed and decreased by the engine cowling. The NTSB noted that several parts of the engine could not be found; they concluded that, based on their calculation and distribution of the fragments on the ground, the unidentified parts were reduced to tiny, harmless bits.

The NTSB also stated that, although the explosion caused serious damage to the engine cowling, the cowlings were all latched. None blew outwards, which would have caused a massive drag force on the plane. This, in turn, could have affected the controllability of the plane. Small portions of the cowling did blow outwards, but the NTSB concluded that these parts caused very little drag force.

The NTSB later concluded that even if any turbine parts were ejected and somehow able to penetrate the plane, the impact would be small and no controls would be affected.

=== Pilot error ===
In the initial seconds after the explosion, Flight 105 swayed to the right and left. In response, Captain Martin used the rudder to counteract the plane's movements. The investigation concluded that the plane was easily controllable, and that it could have been stabilized without the rudder inputs. However, Martin then made a pitch input, raising the aircraft's nose. This served to significantly reduce the DC-9's speed, making a stall more likely. Martin also began banking the plane to the right, the opposite side to the failed engine, which sent Flight 105 into a rapid, rolling dive.

The investigators believe that Martin wrongly perceived the nature of the emergency. The right engine's explosion caused an immediate loss of engine thrust, leading the speed of the aircraft to decrease. This rapid deceleration may have caused Martin to think that the plane was pitching down, and so tried to counter it by pitching up. In reality, Flight 105 was not pitching down; rather, it continued climbing with wings level, and was initially in no danger of stalling. The investigators suggested that Martin may have experienced a somatogravic illusion, a form of spatial disorientation, at the outset of the emergency, and so lost full awareness of what the plane was doing.

Animation of an accelerated stall

The NTSB noted that Flight 105 banked so far to the right that the plane entered a state that investigators refer to as an "accelerated stall".

=== Cockpit breakdown ===
Seconds after the failure of the right engine, Captain Martin correctly applied right rudder to level the plane. However, as he seems to have been uncertain about the exact situation Flight 105 was in, he asked First Officer Weiss what was going on. The NTSB suggested that, as Weiss was senior to and had more experience than Martin, the captain may have thought that Weiss might be more knowledgeable than him in identifying the nature of the emergency. However, both pilots were still fairly inexperienced on the DC-9, having just over one thousand hours each on the type.

As per their training, first officers are expected to work with their captains to handle emergencies together. However, Weiss did not respond to any of Martin's questions, leaving Martin to, effectively, deal with the crisis alone. Based on the evidence from the CVR, investigators believe that Weiss actually heard Martin's queries, but, for unknown reasons, ignored them. He was not incapacitated, as he responded to ATC's call while Martin was asking him what the problem was. Weiss's failure to respond may have further confused Captain Martin as to the exact state of the aircraft, leading to the captain quickly becoming overwhelmed and unable to diagnose the situation correctly.

Exactly why Weiss didn't answer Martin could never be fully determined. Investigators suggested that Weiss may have been equally confused by the information on his instruments, and so could not answer effectively. It is also possible (if not likely) that Weiss had been influenced by an unwritten policy at Midwest Express, known as the "silent cockpit" rule. Under this policy, Midwest Express pilots were expected to keep their focus on the takeoff after 100 knots (190 km/h), making no unnecessary callouts, or even discussing the nature of an emergency, until they had reached an altitude of 800 ft (240 m). The emergency on board Flight 105 that day started at roughly 700 ft (210 m), meaning that the "silent cockpit" rule was still in effect. Investigators stated that the pilots should have begun talking to each other immediately after the explosion, since a low altitude emergency was extremely dangerous. If Weiss was indeed following the "silent cockpit" rule, it meant that the crew's ability to work together effectively had been compromised from the outset. According to investigators, the "silent cockpit" rule conflicted with FAA regulations, and so should never have been approved in the first place.

Regardless of the reason, the NTSB argued that Weiss should have assisted Martin in responding to and diagnosing the problem that had occurred on board Flight 105, as:

"The redundancy provided by the First Officer is one of the basic tenets of Cockpit Resource Management."

The NTSB concluded that this breakdown in crew communication and coordination was one of the primary causes of the accident.

=== Inadequate FAA oversight ===
The lack of experience of an FAA Principal Operations Inspector (POI) may have caused the silent cockpit philosophy to be approved by the FAA without proper examination. The philosophy was contrary to the approved practice by the FAA. If she had had more experience, she might have recognized that the concept had flaws, and that the airline was already teaching the concept to their employees.

The NTSB believed that the POI who worked with Midwest Express did not perform her duties at an adequate level. As per the final report:

"The safety board believes that the FAA oversight of Midwest Express procedures and training during certification and ongoing day-to-day activity in the carrier's first 2 years of operation was less than optimum and probably suffered as a direct result of the inexperience of the POI. The POI testified that she devoted only 20 percent of her worktime to Midwest Express, her only FAR 121 scheduled passenger airline, and that she was still obligated to perform routine general aviation rules. The Board noted that the POI had no previous FAR 121 air carrier experience, that she was not rated in a turbojet of the category and class used by the airline, and that she had not rated received any formal training in the DC-9 airplane used by the certificate holder for which she was responsible. In fact, she had no turbojet pilot experience. Neither did the POI have available for consultation or assistance air carrier inspectors assigned to other offices to fulfill her responsibilities. Apparently, she had become so dependent on other inspectors in surveilling Midwest Express that her own role was reduced primarily to administrative matters. The absence of first-hand knowledge of the carrier and her lack of experience in turbojet air carrier operations severely handicapped her ability to perform the quality of surveillance required to detect shortcomings of FAR 121 airline operation. The Safety Board believes that the experience level of the POI was inappropriate for her assignment as the POI of a new air carrier operating turbojet equipment. She even testified that she was not totally comfortable with the arrangement."

== In popular culture/memorial ==
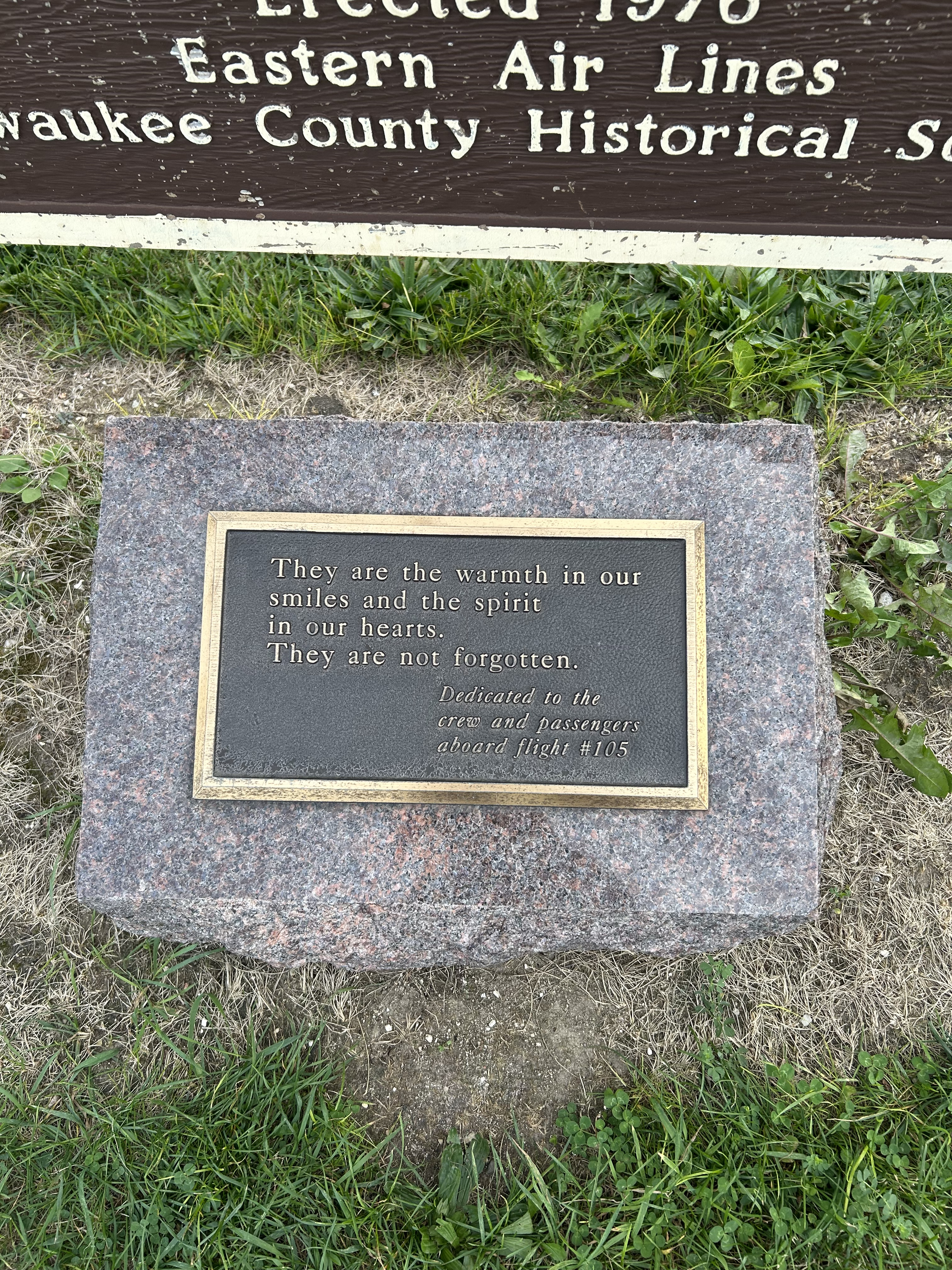
The memorial located at Milwaukee Mitchel Airport

The accident was featured in season 25, episode 7 of the Canadian documentary series Mayday, titled "Deadly Climb".

On the 35th anniversary, a concrete slab with a gold plaque was placed in a small park near the end of runway 19R, the same runway the flight took off from. The plaque reads: "They are the warmth in our smiles and the spirit in our hearts. They are not forgotten. Dedicated to the crew and passengers aboard flight #105."

== See also ==
- Aviation safety
