= Midwest Air Group =

Airline holding company in the United States

Midwest Air Group, Inc. (formerly listed AMEX:MEH) is an American airline holding company based in Oak Creek, Wisconsin which owned Midwest Airlines which previously operated as Midwest Express Airlines. It was ultimately controlled by parent company, TPG Capital Texas Pacific Group. Delta with the merger of Northwest Airlines Inc,. now owns 47% of the reformulated company's stock in a "silent partnership," which has now evolved into a full codeshare partnership between the two airlines.

== History ==
The company began as Midwest Express Holdings, Inc. On April 17, 1989, The Midwest Express Connection was created and based in Milwaukee. The aircraft operated by Mesa Air Group.

In 1994, Astral Aviation later named Skyway Airlines, Inc., was formed to own and operate The Midwest Express Connection turboprop aircraft feeding passengers to the larger aircraft operated by Midwest Express.

An initial public offering IPO in September 1995 took the company public.

In March 2003, the company changed the names of its operational airlines with The Midwest Express Connection becoming Midwest Connect and Midwest Express becoming Midwest Airlines.

In January 2004 the company changed its name to Midwest Air Group, Inc, which was subsequently acquired by TPG Capital on January 31, 2008. Since this acquisition has been made, it was announced TPG Capital Midwest Air Group will discontinue Skyway Airlines operations, but continue on with Skyway Airlines, Inc. as an aircraft Aircraft ground handling ground handling company. TPG Capital subsidiary Midwest Air group Inc. will eliminate "380 jobs from its subsidiary Skyway Airlines as it moves to outsource all of its regional airline|regional flights."

On June 23, 2009 Republic Airways Holdings announced it would acquire Midwest Air Group and Midwest Airlines from TPG Capital, only one day after Republic had announced its acquisition of Frontier Airlines Holdings the parent company of Frontier Airlines. Midwest Airlines is now a wholly owned subsidiary of Republic Airways Holdings.

Midwest Airlines filed a petition for Chapter 11, Title 11, United States Code|Chapter 11 bankruptcy on February 25, 2016.

== Fleet ==
Most of the fleet of Boeing 717s have been returned to lessors, and most flights have been outsourced to Republic Airways Holdings. Republic Airways Holdings used Embraer 190 E-jets in the full aircraft livery and branding of Midwest Airlines, although the Embraer 190's were crewed entirely by employees of Republic Airways Holdings subsidiary Republic Airlines.
