= John Ruan (politician) =

American politician

Member of the Wisconsin State Assembly
- In office 1860; 1855

Personal details
- Born: 1813 County Mayo, Ireland
- Died: May 14, 1892 (aged 78–79)
- Party: Democratic
- Spouse: Catherine Clark

John Ruan (1813 – May 14, 1892) was an Irish-American pioneer and politician who served as a member of the Wisconsin State Assembly in 1855 and 1860.

== Early life ==
Ruan was born in County Mayo, Ireland in 1813.

== Career ==
Along with his wife, Catherine Clark, he emigrated to the United States in 1834, landing in New York City. After living there for two years, he moved to Illinois in 1836. There, he worked as a foreman, helping to build the Illinois and Michigan Canal.

Ruan visited Milwaukee, Wisconsin in 1839, staying with the family of Matthew Keenan. His visit to the city persuaded him to purchase 160 acres (0.65 km^{2}) of land in Milwaukee County in May 1841. Once in the county, he became involved in civic life. Ruan served in the Wisconsin State Assembly in 1855 and 1860; served one year as a supervisor of Oak Creek, Wisconsin in the 1870s.

Ruan’s son James was elected as County Superintendent of Schools for Milwaukee County in 1880.

John Ruan is buried at Calvary Catholic Cemetery in Milwaukee, WI.

== Personal life ==
Ruan was a Democrat and a practicing Roman Catholic.

== Notes ==
This article incorporates text from the 1909 edition of Memoirs of Milwaukee County, by Jerome Anthony Watrous which is in the public domain in the United States.
