= Midwest Airlines =

Airline of the United States (1984–2010)

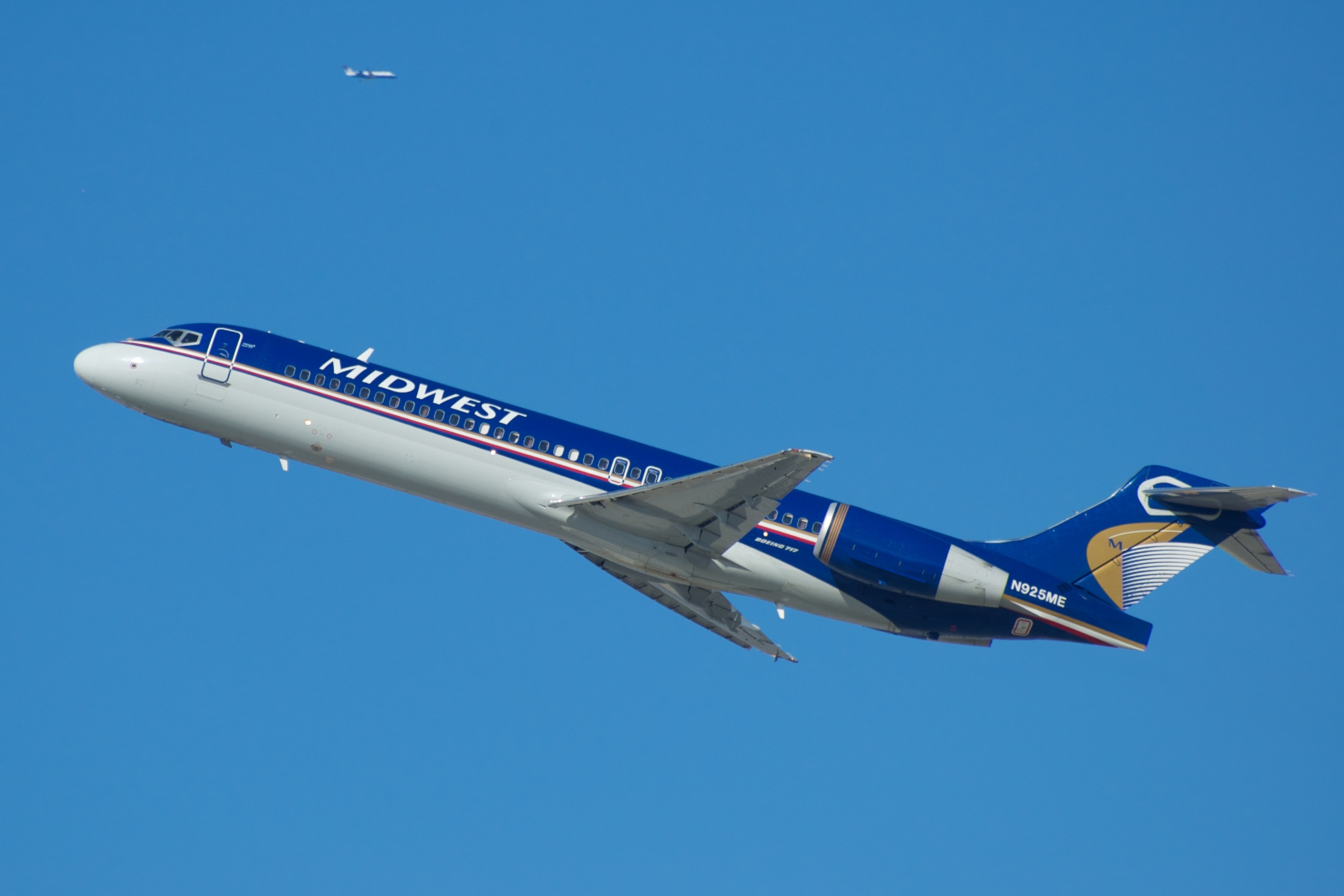
IATA	ICAO	Call sign
YX	MEP	MIDEX
- Founded: 1948 (as K-C Aviation); Neenah, Wisconsin
- Commenced operations: 1984 (as Midwest Express Airlines); 2002 (as Midwest Airlines)
- Ceased operations: November 2010 (merged into Frontier Airlines)
- Hubs: Milwaukee
- Focus cities: Kansas City; Omaha
- Frequent-flyer program: Midwest Miles
- Parent company: Midwest Air Group; Republic Airways Holdings; Kimberly-Clark
- Headquarters: Oak Creek, Wisconsin, U.S.
- Key people: Bryan Bedford; Timothy E. Hoeksema

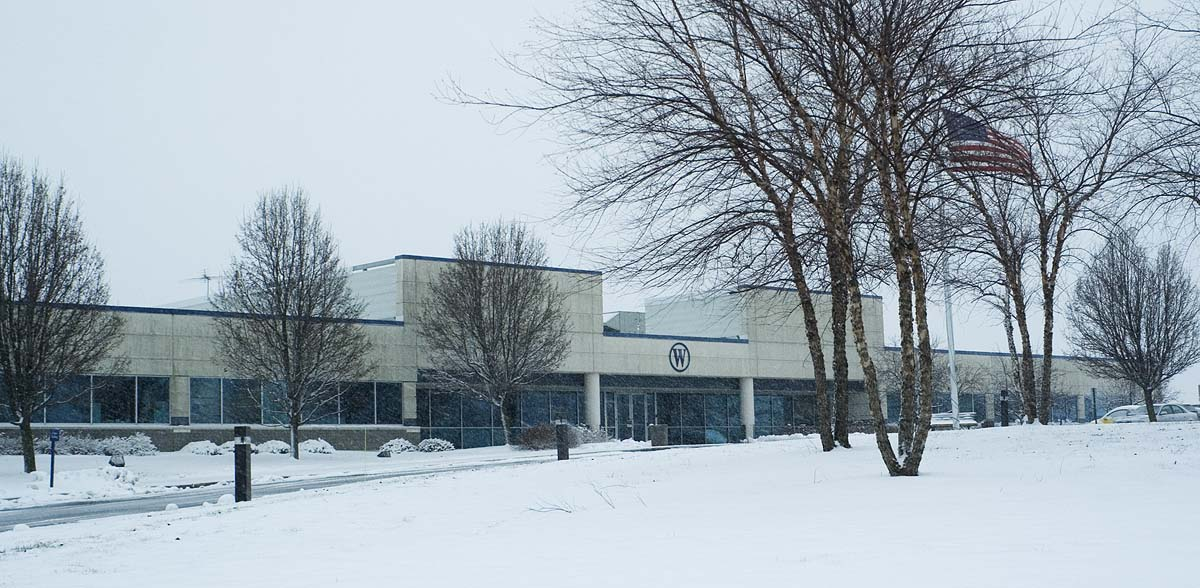
Headquarters

Midwest Airlines (formerly Midwest Express Airlines) was an airline in the United States headquartered in Oak Creek, Wisconsin, that operated from Milwaukee Mitchell International Airport between 1984 and 2010. For a short time, it also operated as a brand of Republic Airways Holdings.

Operations as an independent airline ceased in November 2010, upon its merger with Frontier Airlines.

== History ==
=== K-C Aviation ===
Midwest Airlines began in 1948, when Kimberly-Clark began providing air transportation for company executives and engineers between the company's Neenah, Wisconsin headquarters and its mills. Operating out of the nearby Appleton International Airport, early employee shuttle destinations included Chicago O'Hare, Memphis, and Atlanta's Fulton County Airport.

In 1969, K-C Aviation was born from this, and was dedicated to the maintenance of corporate aircraft. K-C Aviation was sold in 1998 to Gulfstream Aerospace for $250 million; included were its operations in Appleton, Dallas, and Westfield, Massachusetts.

=== Midwest Express Airlines ===
After the Airline Deregulation Act of 1978, Kimberly-Clark and K-C Aviation decided to form a regularly scheduled passenger airline, and Midwest Express Airlines began operations on June 11, 1984. At the time the airline had two Douglas DC-9-10 twin-engine jets and 83 employees. Early plans for the airline called for it to serve Appleton, Chicago, and Atlanta. Kimberly-Clark then opted against this plan with regard to the Atlanta service after local resistance over the carrier's desire to serve Atlanta's Fulton County Airport, which is a general aviation airport located on the city's west side. From 1983 to 1985, the airline also operated a single Convair 580 twin-turboprop aircraft provided by Kimberly-Clark's corporate aviation department on corporate shuttle flights for Kimberly-Clark.

The airline slowly grew, adding additional DC-9 aircraft to its fleet, including larger McDonnell Douglas DC-9-30 jets, with a total of 24 by the end of 1996. Eventually, Midwest Express Airlines served most major Midwestern and East Coast destinations. Its longtime slogan, "The Best Care in the Air", represented its inflight product. For many years, all flights featured 2-by-2 leather seating (in aircraft usually fitted with 3-2 seating), ample legroom, complimentary gourmet meals, and warm chocolate chip cookies. This made the airline popular with business travelers. In addition, Midwest Express operated a sizable executive charter operation with a specially configured DC-9.

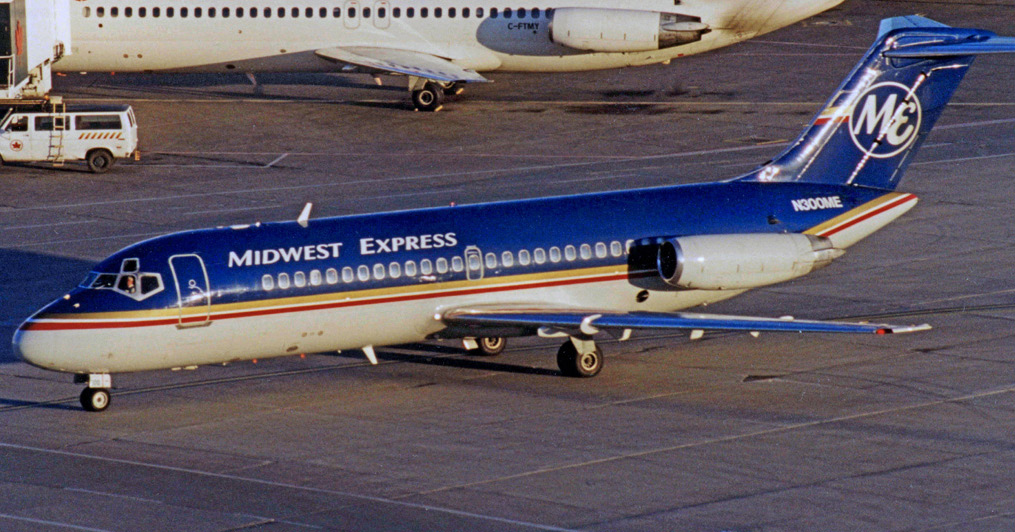
Douglas DC-9 Series 15 of Midwest Express Airlines arriving at Toronto Pearson Airport in 1999

In 1989, Midwest Express added two McDonnell Douglas MD-80 aircraft to its fleet, acquiring eleven additional aircraft between 1998 and 2001. These enabled the airline to expand services to the West Coast and Florida. 1989 also saw the addition of commuter airline feeder services operated by Skyway Airlines. Skyway was a division of Mesa Airlines using Beechcraft 1900 aircraft providing service to small communities in Wisconsin and the surrounding region. Midwest Express experienced steady growth and continued profitability, opening an additional hub in Omaha, Nebraska in early 1995. In 1994 Midwest Express established Astral Aviation to take over the operation of Skyway Airlines, dba Midwest Express Connection and Fairchild Dornier 328JETs were added in 1999. Kimberly-Clark relinquished its ownership in two initial public offerings on September 22, 1995, and May 8, 1996. The airline's new parent company, Midwest Air Group, traded on the American Stock Exchange under the ticker symbol "MEH."

Midwest Express Airlines also added Midwest Vacations in the 1990s, naming GOGO Worldwide Vacations as the original partner to provide hotel service and later partnering with Mark Travel.

In 1997, according to the Midwest Express timetable, the airline was code sharing with Virgin Atlantic Airways for flights between London Heathrow Airport and Milwaukee and Kansas City with passengers connecting between the two air carriers in Boston.

After fourteen years of profit-making, Midwest Express Airlines was affected with serious financial problems after the September 11 terrorist attacks. To return to profitability, the airline made major changes. The Omaha hub was reduced to a focus city in early 2002, with hub status transferred to Kansas City. Some MD-80 series aircraft were reconfigured into a new "Saver Service", featuring cloth coach seats in a 2-by-3 arrangement. Saver Service, while decreasing the width of the seats, continued to feature ample legroom. This service was initially offered from the Milwaukee and Kansas City hubs to leisure destinations such as Florida, Los Angeles, Las Vegas, and Phoenix on McDonnell Douglas MD-80 aircraft. The airline's Signature Service was also affected by financial difficulties. The signature gourmet meal services, which had been served on china after being cooked on board, were discontinued in 2002 and replaced with a buy-on-board product.

==== Midwest Express Airlines destinations in 1984 ====
Midwest Express was serving the following destinations in October 1984:

- Appleton, WI (ATW)
- Boston, MA (BOS)
- Dallas/Fort Worth, TX (DFW)
- Newark, NJ (EWR)
- Milwaukee, WI (MKE) – hub & airline headquarters

By 1985, Atlanta (ATL) had been added to the route system with service to Newark being discontinued at this time and by 1986 flights had been begun to Madison, Wisconsin (MSN), New York City LaGuardia Airport (LGA) and Washington, D.C. National Airport (DCA). All service was flown nonstop between Milwaukee and these destinations, with the exception of a nonstop route between Appleton and Newark in 1984 that had been discontinued by 1985.

==== Midwest Express Airlines destinations in 2001 ====
The airline was serving the following destinations in June 2001:

- Appleton, WI (ATW)
- Atlanta, GA (ATL)
- Boston, MA (BOS)
- Cleveland, OH (CLE)
- Columbus, OH (CMH)
- Dallas/Fort Worth, TX (DFW)
- Denver, CO (DEN)
- Des Moines, IA (DSM)
- Fort Lauderdale, FL (FLL) – seasonal service
- Fort Myers, FL (RSW) – seasonal service
- Hartford, CT (BDL)
- Kansas City, MO (MCI) – focus city
- Las Vegas, NV (LAS)
- Los Angeles (LAX)
- Madison, WI (MSN)
- Milwaukee, WI (MKE) – primary hub & airline headquarters
- Newark, NJ (EWR)
- New Orleans, LA (MSY)
- New York City, NY – LaGuardia Airport (LGA)
- Omaha, NE (OMA) – secondary hub
- Orlando, FL (MCO)
- Philadelphia, PA (PHL)
- Raleigh/Durham, NC (RDU)
- San Antonio, TX (SAT)
- San Francisco, CA (SFO) – seasonal service
- Tampa, FL (TPA) – seasonal service
- Washington, D.C. – Dulles International Airport (IAD)
- Washington, D.C. – Reagan National Airport (DCA)

In early 2002 Kansas City became a secondary hub for the airline while Omaha was reduced to a focus city.

=== Midwest Airlines ===
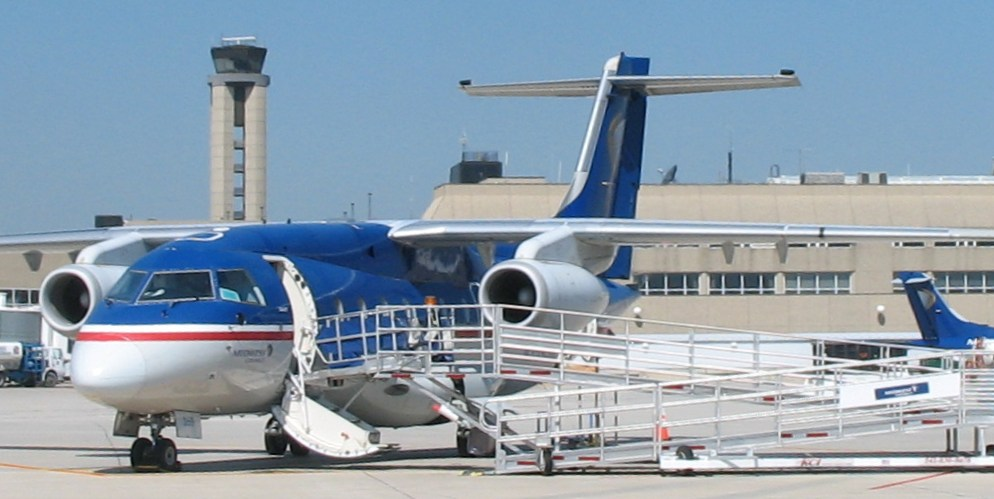
A Skyway Airlines Fairchild Dornier 328JET painted in the colors of Midwest Connect at General Mitchell International Airport in Milwaukee, WI. Skyway Airlines aircraft operated under contract to Midwest.

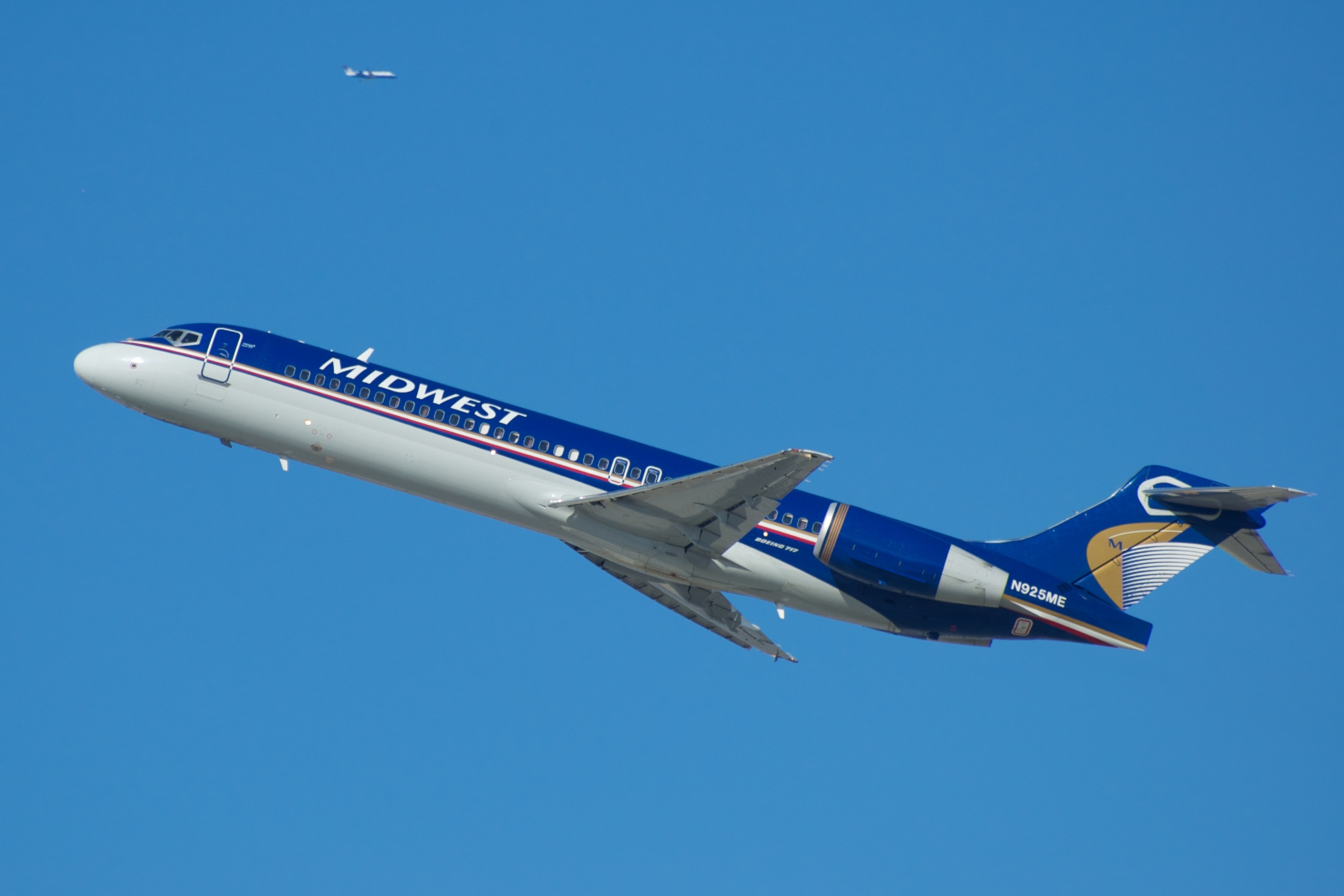
A Boeing 717 in the airline's final livery

In 2002, the airline made another major change, shortening its name from Midwest Express Airlines to simply Midwest Airlines. A major reason for the change was the modern association of "express" with a regional airline, which Midwest was not. At the same time, Midwest's commuter airline subsidiary changed its name from Skyway Airlines, the Midwest Express Connection, to Midwest Connect. In a move to save money on jet fuel, the airline accelerated the replacement of DC-9 aircraft with the Boeing 717-200. On May 23, 2006, Midwest Airlines accepted one of the last two Boeing 717s delivered in a ceremony with AirTran Airways, who accepted the other 717. Midwest also announced that selected MD-80 aircraft would leave the fleet.

In May 2005, Midwest announced a new buy-on-board meal service for customers. The new program was a change from the previous 'In-flight Cafe' and featured chefs and inspiration from the renowned Mader's restaurant. Chocolate chip cookies continued to be baked on the plane and served warm.

Midwest became the largest longstanding operation at Mitchell Airport and served 21 cities nonstop (San Antonio (SAT) as well as Orange County, CA (SNA) were served from Milwaukee with one stop flights via Kansas City in 2005), while its regional partner Skyway Airlines, operating as Midwest Connect, served nearly 30 destinations throughout the Central United States.

In 2006, a second regional airline, SkyWest Airlines, began providing feeder service as Midwest Connect along with Skyway. SkyWest flew Bombardier CRJ100/200 regional jets. Skyway was later shut down in 2008 and service to many of the smaller cities served with Beech 1900's had ended.

On May 17, 2007, Midwest Airlines signed a Memorandum of Understanding with Northwest Airlines to form a codeshare agreement with them. The codeshare agreement added 250 city pairs and 1,000 new flight options for Midwest Airlines customers. Northwest routes that included the Midwest Airlines YX code were destinations beyond Northwest's hubs at Detroit, Minneapolis/St. Paul and Memphis throughout the United States and Canada. Midwest placed its code on Northwest flights from Indianapolis, then a Northwest focus city, as well as a number of Northwest-operated flights to Hawaii and Alaska. Routes operated by Midwest Airlines that carried the NW Northwest code were flights that connected at Midwest's Milwaukee and Kansas City hubs, as well as Omaha, a Midwest focus city. Northwest also code shared on Midwest Airlines-operated flights between Milwaukee and Kansas City to Atlanta, Boston, Hartford, Los Angeles and San Francisco that connected to the Northwest/KLM trans-Atlantic network and trans-Pacific network.

Midwest won more awards for exceptional service in Condé Nast Traveler magazine than any other U.S. airline, although it won no further awards from the magazine after ceasing to be an independent company.

=== Signature and Saver service added ===
On May 29, 2007, Midwest announced the next phase of the company's strategic plan, which offered customers the choice of Signature and Saver seating on all flights. The dual-seating option, replacing the original 88-seat configuration, was available on the airline's Boeing 717s until their retirement. The same amenities were provided to all passengers in either cabin, including leather seats.

The new configuration consisted of 40 Signature leather seats, arranged in 10 rows of two-by-two, offering a 36" pitch and providing 2 to 3 more inches of leg room than the previous Signature seating, and 59 Saver seats arranged two-by-three which the company claimed were among the roomiest coach seats in the industry.

The company projected that the implementation of seating choices would generate $30–35 million in annualized revenue.

=== Acquisition by TPG ===
In December 2006, AirTran Holdings Inc., owner of AirTran Airways, made public that in December 2005 it had approached the Board of Directors of Midwest Air Group—owner of Midwest Airlines and Midwest Connect, and had asked the board to negotiate a sale of the company. That AirTran offer in 2005 was rebuffed by Midwest's board, which also rebuffed a second offer in late 2006. In December 2006, AirTran disclosed the rejection of both offers in hopes of bringing shareholder pressure on Midwest's board to reconsider, which the board recommended that shareholders reject.

On August 12, 2007, it was announced that AirTran had lost the bid for Midwest. A private equity group, headed by TPG Capital and including Northwest Airlines, purchased Midwest and turned the airline into a privately funded company. The inclusion of Northwest in the investing partners required anti-trust review from the United States Department of Justice, which reviews all airline mergers.

On August 14, 2007, AirTran increased its offer to the equivalent of $16.25 a share, slightly more than the $16 a share from TPG Capital investors group. However, Midwest announced TPG would increase its offer to $17 per share and a definitive agreement had been reached late on August 16, 2007.

On August 17, 2007, TPG and Northwest Airlines finalized their bid for Midwest with the final offer of $17 per share and a total deal of $450 million.

On February 1, 2008, Midwest Air Group announced that the US Department of Justice had cleared the acquisition of Midwest by TPG Capital and Northwest. This finalized the acquisition; trading of Midwest Air Group on the American Stock Exchange ceased at the end of the trading day on January 31, 2008, and stockholders in Midwest received the agreed-upon $17 per share. This ended the independent existence of Midwest Airlines.

In accordance with the rest of the airline industry during the oil price increases since 2003, Midwest Airlines was forced to cut back services. To do this, Midwest Airlines announced its intent to retire the 12 remaining McDonnell Douglas MD-80 jets in its fleet. According to the company, the MD-80 was "a very fuel inefficient airplane and at the cost of fuel today it's just become economically infeasible to operate these planes." The MD-80s, and the crews that operated them, left Midwest in late 2008.

In April 2007, SkyWest Airlines began operating flights under the Midwest Connect brand alongside in-house subsidiary Skyway Airlines. Skyway shut down one year later, leaving SkyWest as Midwest's sole regional contractor. Midwest failed to pay a $3.3 million receivable that was due to SkyWest in June, 2008, forcing them to record a full reserve and corresponding reduction in revenue during the second quarter of that year.

Additional changes were announced on September 3, 2008, when the airline announced that it had raised $60 million from TPG, Northwest Airlines, and Republic Airways Holdings. As part of the outsourcing deal, Republic Airline operated 12 Embraer 170 aircraft under the Midwest Airlines brand, though Midwest had the option to convert the aircraft into a long-term lease and operate them directly. The airline also reached an agreement with Boeing Capital to return 16 Boeing 717s, leaving it at the time with a fleet of only 9 aircraft.

=== Acquisition by Republic Airways Holdings ===
On June 23, 2009, Republic Airways Holdings, Inc announced they would acquire Midwest Airlines for $31 million. The deal closed on July 30. Midwest became a wholly owned subsidiary of Republic Airways and continued to operate under current branding. The Midwest Airlines FAA operating certificate expired on November 3, 2009. The acquisition by Republic occurred just 22 months after TPG and Northwest Airlines paid $450 million for Midwest. The total loss of investment by TPG and Northwest was 93% or $419 million.

==== Flight outsourcing to Republic Airways ====
On September 3, 2008, Midwest Airlines announced its plan to outsource all of its flight operations to Republic Airways. Republic began operating twelve 76-seat Embraer ERJ-170 jets under the Midwest Connect name while Midwest returned its 25 Boeing 717 planes to Boeing under a lease renegotiation. While this change caused the additional layoffs bringing the total of pink-slipped Midwest pilots to nearly 300 and total employee cuts for the year to 1,850, Midwest indicated that it hoped to begin operating these new planes itself with Midwest crews in 8–12 months from that time. Additional aircraft from Republic were added to the operation in the form of larger Embraer ERJ-190s in August 2009. Chautauqua Airlines, a wholly owned subsidiary of Republic Airways, also began service as Midwest Connect in August 2009 using Embraer 135/145 regional jets.

The Midwest branch of the Air Line Pilots Association launched a campaign protesting the Midwest outsourcing plan shortly after it was announced. They argued that the pilots had already made significant concessions to help Midwest Airlines survive and that the company's new contract offers represented draconian demands.

==== Merger into Frontier Airlines ====
Midwest Airlines' final flight operated with a Boeing 717-200 and staffed with Midwest Airlines flight crews landed in Milwaukee on November 2, 2009. Effective November 3, 2009, Midwest Airlines ceased to exist as an operating airline (allowing its DOT air carrier operator certificate to lapse). Midwest Connect flights operated by SkyWest Airlines also ended. Midwest Connect flights operated by Republic and Chautauqua Airlines would continue to operate using the YX code through September 2010.

On April 13, 2010, parent company Republic Airways Holdings announced that its Frontier Airlines and Midwest Airlines brands would merge under the Frontier Airlines name. Parts of the Midwest brand were incorporated into the Frontier brand as part of the merger, namely the Midwest cookie and the slogan of Midwest Airlines, "The Best Care In The Air." Some Frontier Airlines Airbus A319 aircraft also began operating on former Midwest routes using the YX code alongside Midwest Connect flights.

On October 1, 2010, the midwestairlines.com website was shut down for future reservations (besides frequent flyer tickets), and shut down completely on October 28, and users redirected to Frontier Airlines' website. In early November 2010, Midwest's YX code was retired and adopted by Republic Airways.

The Republic and Chautauqua feeder operations would then operate as Frontier Airlines. Several of the Embraer 170/190 aircraft retained the Midwest livery into late 2013 until their retirement or reassignment by Republic. The Chautauqua Embraer 135/145 fleet was repainted with the Frontier livery but were retired by January, 2013.

=== Proposed revival of Midwest Express brand (2017–present) ===
In August 2017, reports surfaced that there were ongoing efforts to revive the Midwest brand. According to the Milwaukee Journal Sentinel, a group of people was trying to secure investors to relaunch the airline using the original Midwest Express name.

On August 9, 2019, it was announced that Elite Airways had signed an operating agreement to provide the initial aircraft, flight crews, and maintenance service for Midwest Express. On August 28, 2019, the airline announced its initial route network, which were to include Cincinnati, Omaha, and Grand Rapids, with service to commence by the year end.

As of end-February 2020, however, the launch had been delayed three months.

In early May 2020, Republic (RPA) aircraft were being observed via ADS-B virtual radar being operated on Republic routes using scheduled RPA flight numbers but with the Midwest Airlines (MEP) prefix.

== Corporate affairs ==
=== Corporate identity ===
==== Aircraft livery ====
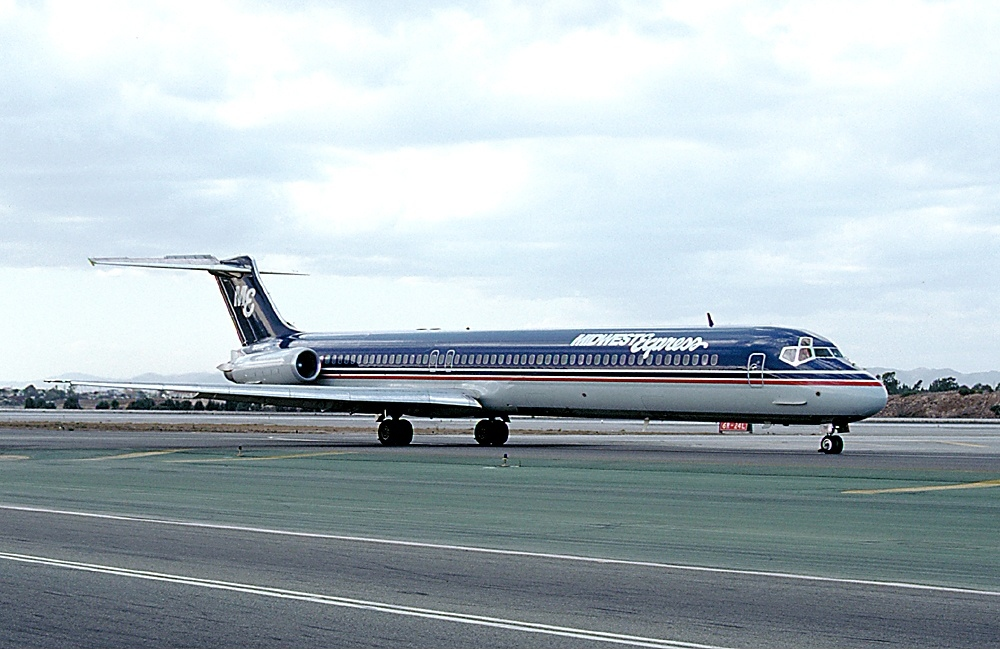
One of the airline's MD-88s photographed in Midwest Express' first livery in 1991

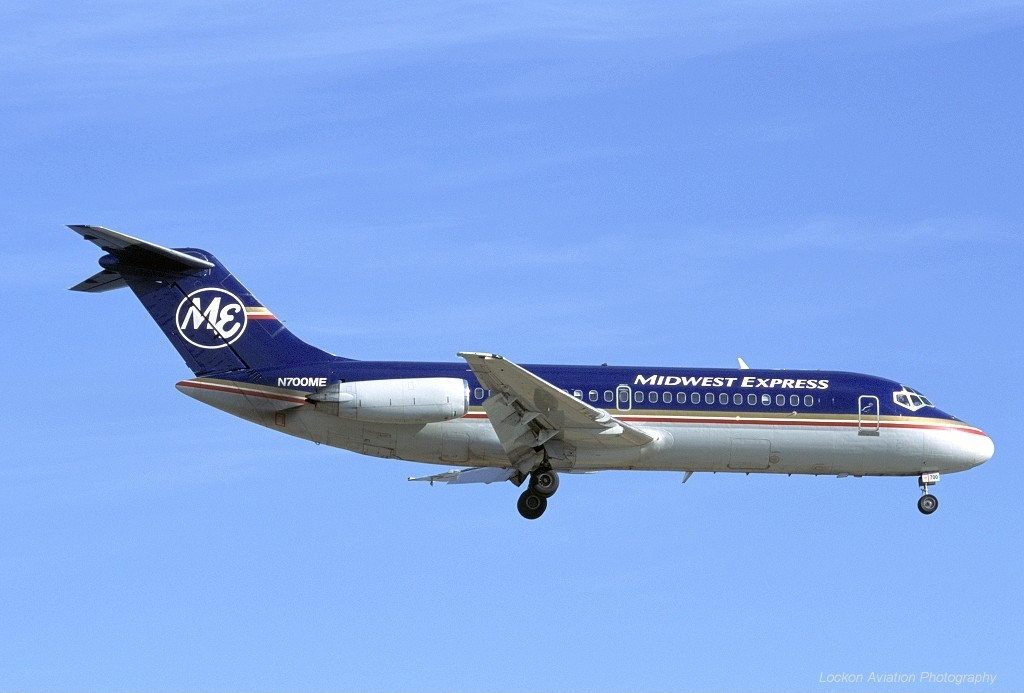
A DC-9-14 in Midwest Express' second livery in 2002

Midwest Express' original livery consisted of dark blue on the upper half, and white on the lower half. The two were separated by blue and red cheatlines with white in between, which ran up the trailing edge of the tail. The engines were white, and on the tail was a bold "M" and a script "E", representing the airline name, and the way the titles were printed on the fuselage. This scheme could still be found on one Beech 1900D of Midwest Connect, without the "M E" on the tail, as late as 2005.

In 1989, the airline started to add the McDonnell Douglas MD-80 to the fleet, initially in the same livery. In the mid-1990s, the livery was substantially revised. The top half of the aircraft remained blue (albeit slightly brighter), but the bottom half was repainted light grey, along with the engines, and they were now separated by gold, white, and red cheatline. The tail logo also underwent minor changes, adding a circle around the lettering and the same cheatline from the fuselage connecting the circle to the leading edge of the tail. Despite the unchanged lettering on the tail, the titles on the fuselage were changed to all bold letters, rather than the script "Express" titles.

In 2003, Midwest Express Airlines began to create a new identity, as the first Boeing 717s were being delivered, and the DC-9 aircraft were being retired. The company started with removing the "Express" from its name (and thus, off the fuselage), and it designed a new logo that would help point it out as a representative of Milwaukee. The result was a logo that looked much like a wing, with a small 'M' inside of it. However, if the logo is turned on its side, it bears a resemblance to the Milwaukee Art Museum, designed by Santiago Calatrava, which was being constructed at the same time. The Art Museum had risen as an icon of Milwaukee, and so the new Midwest Airlines felt this would be a good representation. Along with this new identity came a new livery. The bottom of the aircraft remained grey, while the top was repainted in a deeper blue, with essentially the same gold, white, and red cheatlines separating the two. On the lower half, there was also a blue swoop, starting at the front (looking much like another stripe), getting larger as it went back until it covered the entire rear fuselage. The engines on these planes were painted in the same blue color, with four gold rings on the port engine, and three on the starboard. This was meant to represent the ranking of Captain and First Officer, along with where they sit. Only three MD-80 aircraft, registered N813ME, N822ME, and N823ME ever wore the full new livery; all other MD-80s wore a hybrid livery until retirement, combining the second Midwest Express livery with the current logo and titling of Midwest Airlines. In the transitional period, some MD-80s also received the new titles before the new tail logo, resulting in another variation on the livery.

==== Cookies ====
Screenshot of Savethecookie campaign

A defining feature of the airline was the chocolate chip cookies baked on the aircraft and served during flights. The airline began serving the cookies after an employee experimented with different snacks on an empty leg of a charter flight.

The cookie was featured in Midwest advertisements, such as the "Save the Cookie" campaign in opposition to the proposed and failed AirTran takeover. The cookie was served during professional baseball games at Kauffman Stadium, as well as Bucks basketball and Admirals hockey games at Milwaukee's Bradley Center.

The cookie outlived the brand, as it was briefly served on Frontier Airlines flights. The airline's branded cookie dough, sold at Milwaukee-area grocery stores, was subsequently re-labeled as a Frontier product until its discontinuation. Frontier announced in 2012 that the airline would discontinue its cookie service as a cost-per-value cut, and instead added for-purchase snacks from Colorado-based suppliers.

== Destinations ==
This is a list of destinations that Midwest Airlines, operated by Frontier Airlines and Republic Airways, was serving as of April 2010. Midwest Connect destinations are not included.

- Arizona
  - Phoenix Sky Harbor International Airport
- California
  - Los Angeles International Airport
  - San Francisco International Airport
- Colorado
  - Denver International Airport
- Florida
  - Orlando International Airport
  - Tampa International Airport
  - Fort Myers Southwest Florida International Airport
  - Fort Lauderdale – Hollywood International Airport
- Georgia
  - Hartsfield-Jackson Atlanta International Airport
- Louisiana
  - New Orleans (Louis Armstrong New Orleans International Airport)
- Massachusetts
  - Boston Logan International Airport
- Minnesota
  - Minneapolis-Saint Paul International Airport
- Missouri
  - Kansas City International Airport
- Nebraska
  - Eppley Airfield (Omaha)
- Nevada
  - Las Vegas McCarran International Airport
- North Carolina
  - Raleigh-Durham International Airport
- New Jersey
  - Newark Liberty International Airport
- New York
  - LaGuardia Airport
- Ohio
  - Port Columbus International Airport
- Pennsylvania
  - Philadelphia International Airport
  - Pittsburgh International Airport
- Texas
  - Dallas/Fort Worth International Airport
- Virginia/DC
  - Ronald Reagan Washington National Airport
- Washington
  - Seattle-Tacoma International Airport
- Wisconsin
  - Outagamie County Regional Airport
  - Milwaukee General Mitchell International Airport (primary hub)

== Fleet ==
=== Fleet at time of closure ===
As of November 2009, Frontier Airlines pilots and crew operated five Airbus A319-100 aircraft for Midwest Airlines. All former Midwest Airlines Boeing 717s were retired on November 3, 2009. The majority of Midwest Airlines routes were operated by Midwest Connect through outsourcing, allowing Midwest to advertise and maintain a route system similar to what existed prior to Midwest Air Group's takeover by Texas Pacific Group: The Boeing 717 aircraft were replaced by the Airbus A319 flown by Frontier Airlines and 15 Embraer 190 aircraft flown by Republic Airways. Ten of these aircraft were purchased from US Airways.

During the merger with Frontier Airlines, it was announced that the Midwest Airlines fleet of Embraers would not be merged into Frontier Airlines' operating certificate; the two types of aircraft would continue to be crewed and operated separately by the two airlines.

Fleet branded as Midwest Airlines at time of merger into Frontier
Aircraft	Total	Passengers (Signature/Saver)	Routes	Notes
Airbus A319-100	5	136 (0/136)	Domestic	Operated by Frontier Airlines
Embraer 170	15	76 (0/76)	Domestic	Operated by Republic Airways
Embraer 190	10	99 (11/88)	Domestic	Operated by Republic Airways

=== Historical fleet ===
Midwest Airlines historical fleet
Aircraft	Total	Passengers (Signature/Saver)	Year retired	Notes
Convair 580	1		1985	Not used in scheduled service. Sole use was Kimberly-Clark corporate shuttle service, primarily between Appleton, WI and Chicago.
Douglas DC-9-10	9	60 (60/0)	2004	Fleet included DC-9 series 14 and series 15 models
McDonnell Douglas DC-9-30	16	84 (84/0)	2004	Fleet included DC-9 series 32 models
McDonnell Douglas MD-81	8	143 (12/131)	2008	MD-80 series aircraft added to the fleet enabled the airline to fly nonstop between Milwaukee and U.S. West Coast destinations such as Los Angeles (LAX) and San Francisco (SFO). They were configured with 112 Signature seats in a one class cabin configuration until the introduction of the Saver Service product in 2002.
McDonnell Douglas MD-82	3	143 (12/131)	2008	" "
McDonnell Douglas MD-88	4	139 (12/127)	2008	" "
Boeing 717-200	25	88 (88/0) [2003-2007], 99 (40/59) [2007-2009]	2010	Replaced by Frontier Airlines Airbus A319 and Republic Airways Embraer ERJ-190 and Embraer ERJ-170 aircraft.

== Services ==
=== In-flight services ===
Until 2002, Midwest Express served gourmet meals on china along with complimentary alcoholic beverages. With the cost-cutting programs instituted following the post-September 11 industry downturn, this was changed to a buy on board food program, "Best Care Cuisine," with breakfast, lunch, and dinner meals available for purchase. Throughout the airline's existence, warm chocolate chip cookies were served on most flights.

=== Frequent-flyer program ===
Midwest Airlines' frequent flyer program was called Midwest Miles. It maintained one airport lounge, the Best Care Club at its Milwaukee hub in the D Concourse, until its closure on May 31, 2012.

While Midwest was not a member of any airline alliance, Midwest Miles were redeemable in the Delta Air Lines SkyMiles program, and vice versa. As of 2006, Northwest route maps showed Midwest as a partner airline and Northwest (now Delta) pulled its non-hub flights out of Milwaukee.

Midwest Miles was unusual in that it had links to the Amtrak program. Midwest Miles members could transfer blocks of 5,000 miles (8,000 km), up to a maximum of 25,000 miles per year to Amtrak's program. Amtrak points could be used for travel on Amtrak and United Airlines (ex Continental Airlines).

== Accidents and incidents ==
The incidents and crashes listed are from both Midwest and Midwest Express; however, it does not show any incidents that involved Midwest Connect flights or aircraft.

Midwest Express reported incidents
Flight	Date	Aircraft	Location	Description	Injuries				Photo of aircraft involved
Flight	Date	Aircraft	Location	Description	Fatal	Serious	Minor	Uninjured	
105	September 5, 1985	Douglas DC-9-14	Oak Creek, Wisconsin	Engine failure on takeoff, only fatal accident	31	0	0	0	N100ME, the aircraft that crashed as Flight 105
007	September 11, 2001	Douglas DC-9-31	Hudson River, New York	Near mid-air with United Airlines flight 175	0	0	4	31	N207ME, the aircraft involved in the near-miss with United 175
490	May 5, 2005	Boeing 717-200	Union Star, Missouri	Improper deicing procedures, pilot error	0	0	0	80	
210	December 20, 2005	Boeing 717-200	Boston's Logan Airport	Landing gear door retracting issue	0	0	0	86	
8663C (Obama charter flight)	July 7, 2008	Mcdonnell Douglas MD-82	Chicago metropolitan area	unknown, tail cone failure	0	0	0	51	
Total casualties					Fatal	Serious	Minor	Uninjured	
(5 incidents)					31	0	4	244	

== See also ==
- List of defunct airlines of the United States
