= Oak Creek, Wisconsin =

City in Wisconsin, United States

- City
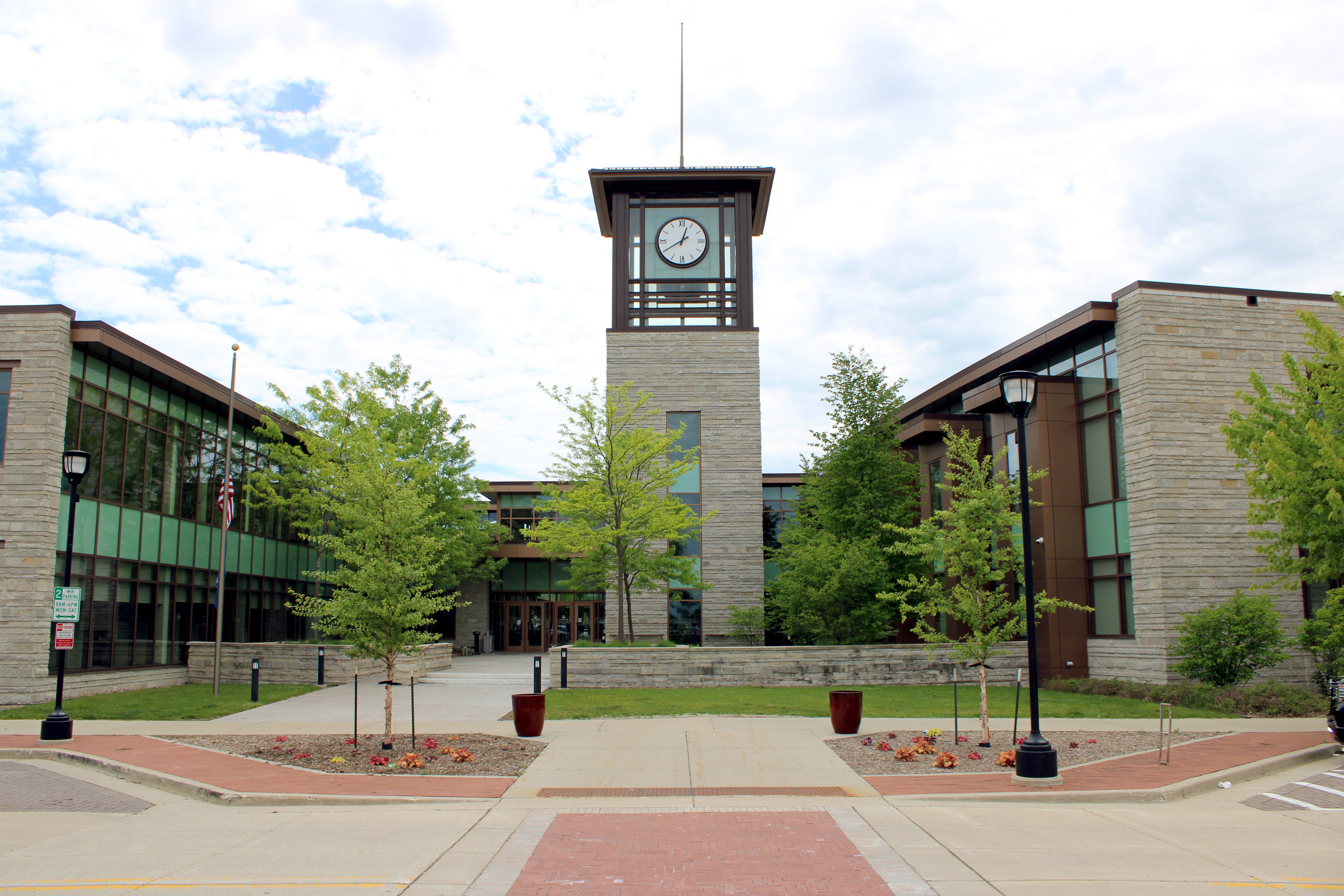
- Oak Creek Civic Center

- Motto: "Where City Meets the Country"
- Interactive map of Oak Creek, Wisconsin
- Location within Wisconsin Location within the United States
- Coordinates: 42°53′4″N 87°53′57″W
- Country: United States
- State: Wisconsin
- County: Milwaukee

Government
  - Mayor: Daniel Bukiewicz

Area
  - Total: 28.45 sq mi (73.68 km^{2})
  - Land: 28.45 sq mi (73.68 km^{2})
  - Water: 0.0077 sq mi (0.02 km^{2})
- Elevation: 702 ft (214 m)

Population (2020)
  - Total: 36,497
  - Density: 1,276.9/sq mi (493.02/km^{2})
- Time zone: UTC−6 (Central (CST))
  - Summer (DST): UTC−5 (CDT)
- ZIP Code: 53154
- Area code: 414
- FIPS code: 55-58800
- GNIS feature ID: 1570601
- Website: www.oakcreekwi.gov

Oak Creek is a city in Milwaukee County, Wisconsin, United States. It sits on the southwestern shore of Lake Michigan and is located immediately south of Milwaukee. The population was 36,497 at the 2020 census. In 2011, the city was one of the fastest growing in Milwaukee County and all of Wisconsin. The area has experienced an economic boom in recent years, with the addition of large companies such as Amazon, IKEA, the Astronautics Corporation of America & Meijer

== History ==
On January 2, 1838, the territorial legislature divided Milwaukee County into two towns: the Town of Milwaukee, encompassing everything north of the present Greenfield Avenue, and the Town of Lake encompassing everything south of the present Greenfield Avenue; "and the polls of election shall be opened at the house of Elisha Higgins, in said town." On March 8, 1839, a new Town of Kinnikennick was created, encompassing the western part of Lake (later the Towns of Greenfield and Franklin); finally, on August 13, 1840, the south portion of the Town of Lake was split off to form the town of Oak Creek. As of the 1840 census, the population of the Town of Lake (then including Oak Creek) was 418.

In 1955, the Town of Oak Creek, then still semi-rural with a population of 4,807 in the 1950 census, was incorporated as a city under the terms of Wisconsin statute 66.0215, also known as "The Oak Creek Law." The Oak Creek Law was crafted by Town Attorney Tony Basile to prevent Oak Creek's annexation by the City of Milwaukee, which by annexations (including the 1954 annexation of the remainder of the Town of Lake) was now bordering Oak Creek and had already annexed one small portion of the town; the law was shepherded through the legislature with the help of state Democratic party legislative joint committee chairman Leland McParland, who was the state senator for Oak Creek.

Carrollville is a historic neighborhood in Oak Creek, Wisconsin, located along the Lake Michigan shoreline. It developed in the late 19th century as an industrial village, initially centered around the Lakeside Distillery and later the U.S. Glue Company, which began operations around 1899. The factory processed leather waste from Milwaukee tanneries and included worker housing, some of which remains today.

In the 1930s, the plant was acquired by the Peter Cooper Corporation, and later by the French firm Rousselot in 1976. Glue production continued until the facility closed in 1985. A major fire in 1987 destroyed much of the abandoned complex. The site, along with other nearby chemical and fertilizer facilities, left a legacy of environmental contamination. Starting in the 2000s, Oak Creek launched efforts to remediate and redevelop the area as part of a broader lakefront revitalization plan. Cleanup and demolition work have aimed to convert the former industrial site into public and recreational space.

On September 6, 1985, Midwest Express Airlines Flight 105, a DC-9-14, crashed shortly after takeoff from Milwaukee’s General Mitchell International Airport. The aircraft experienced an uncontained engine failure and crashed into a field in Oak Creek, Wisconsin, killing all 31 people on board. The NTSB determined the crash was caused by pilot error following the engine failure, including improper rudder input and poor crew coordination.

On August 5, 2012, a mass shooting occurred at the Sikh Temple of Wisconsin in Oak Creek. Wade Michael Page, a white supremacist and former Army veteran, opened fire during morning services, killing six worshippers and wounding four others, including a responding police officer. A seventh victim died from injuries in 2020. Page died by suicide after being shot by police. The attack was classified as a domestic terrorism hate crime and is considered the deadliest attack on Sikhs in U.S. history. The incident led to increased awareness of hate crimes and prompted changes in how such crimes are tracked by federal agencies.

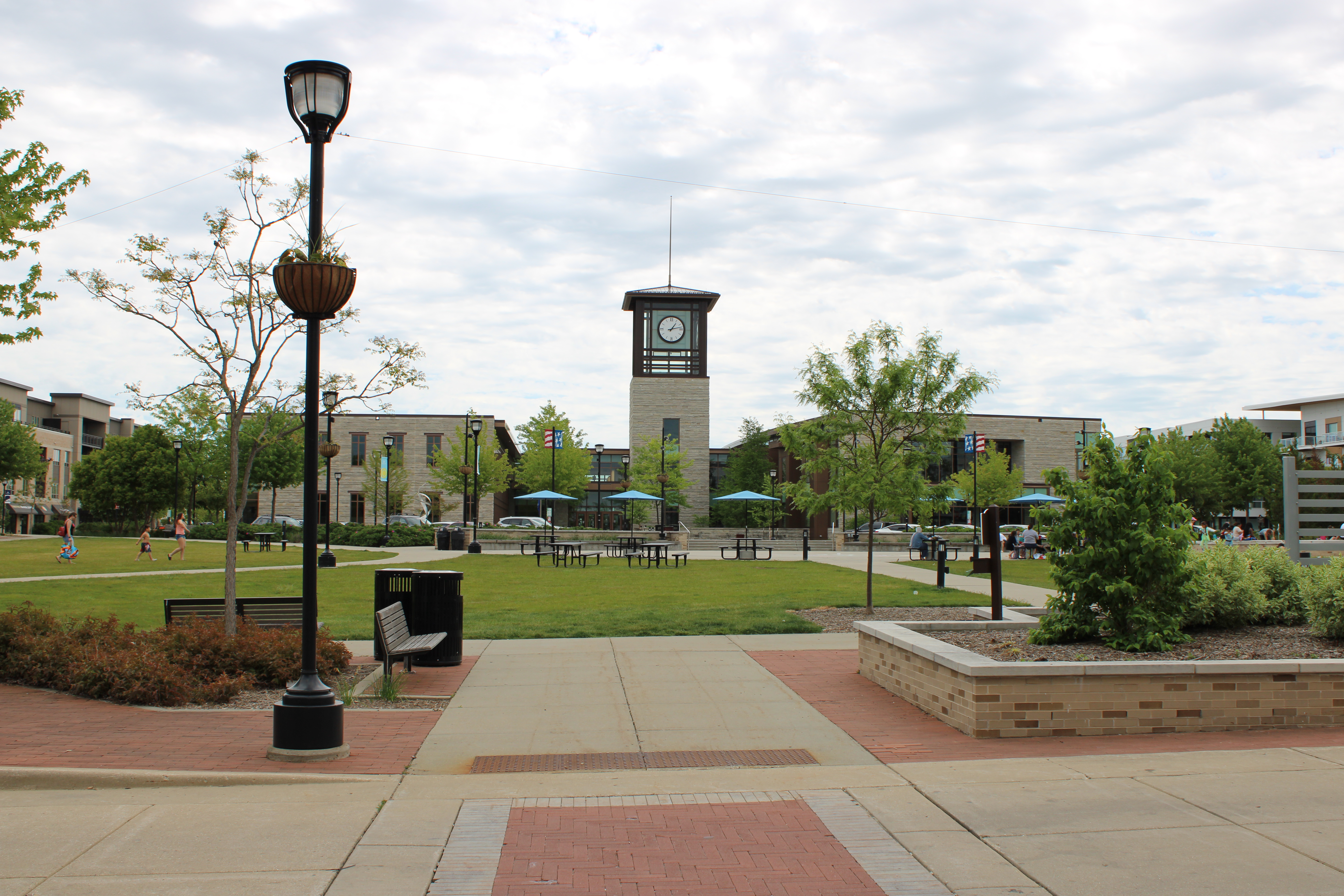
Drexel Town Square

In recent years, the 85-acre site called the Drexel Town Square, built on part of the site where the gigantic AC Spark Plug factory once stood, has become the city's newest economic venture. It is home to a number of retail shops, restaurants, a hotel, residential buildings, and a medical facility. The Civic Center includes city hall and the public library. The town square also features a farmers market, splash pad, ice rink, and an outdoor amphitheater. The town square development won the 2016 Vision Award from the Milwaukee Business Journal.

== Geography ==
Oak Creek is located at 42°53′4″N 87°53′57″W (42.884347, −87.899209).

It is part of the Milwaukee metropolitan area and borders the cities of Milwaukee and Greenfield to the north, the city of South Milwaukee to the north and east, Lake Michigan to the east, the village of Caledonia to the south, the city of Franklin and the village of Greendale to the west.

According to the United States Census Bureau, the city has a total area of 28.45 square miles (73.69 km^{2}), all land.

A small section of the Root River flows north from Racine County through Oak Creek at its southern edge at the Root River Parkway. Additionally, the Oak Creek watershed originates in the city of Franklin and meanders through to Grant Park in South Milwaukee, and ultimately into Lake Michigan. The stream drains about 26 square miles.

== Demographics ==
Historical population
Census	Pop.	Note	%±
1960	9,372		—
1970	13,928		48.6%
1980	16,932		21.6%
1990	19,513		15.2%
2000	28,456		45.8%
2010	34,451		21.1%
2020	36,497		5.9%
Source: U.S. Census

=== 2020 census ===
As of the 2020 census, Oak Creek had a population of 36,497. The median age was 38.9 years. 21.9% of residents were under the age of 18 and 15.2% of residents were 65 years of age or older. For every 100 females there were 96.3 males, and for every 100 females age 18 and over there were 94.0 males age 18 and over.

97.9% of residents lived in urban areas, while 2.1% lived in rural areas.

There were 15,035 households in Oak Creek, of which 29.7% had children under the age of 18 living in them. Of all households, 49.6% were married-couple households, 17.8% were households with a male householder and no spouse or partner present, and 24.9% were households with a female householder and no spouse or partner present. About 29.7% of all households were made up of individuals and 10.8% had someone living alone who was 65 years of age or older.

There were 15,620 housing units, of which 3.7% were vacant. The homeowner vacancy rate was 0.7% and the rental vacancy rate was 5.3%.

Racial composition as of the 2020 census
Race	Number	Percent
White	28,715	78.7%
Black or African American	1,312	3.6%
American Indian and Alaska Native	187	0.5%
Asian	2,527	6.9%
Native Hawaiian and Other Pacific Islander	10	0.0%
Some other race	979	2.7%
Two or more races	2,767	7.6%
Hispanic or Latino (of any race)	3,448	9.4%

=== 2010 census ===
At the 2010 census, there were 34,451 people, 14,064 households and 9,077 families residing in the city. The population density was 1,210.9 per square mile (467.5/km^{2}). There were 14,754 housing units at an average density of 518.6 per square mile (200.2/km^{2}). The racial makeup was 87.7% White, 2.8% African American, 0.7% Native American, 4.5% Asian, 2.1% from other races, and 2.1% from two or more races. Hispanic or Latino of any race were 7.5% of the population.

There were 14,064 households, of which 32.1% had children under the age of 18 living with them, 52.3% were married couples living together, 8.2% had a female householder with no husband present, 4.0% had a male householder with no wife present, and 35.5% were non-families. Of all households, 28.6% were made up of individuals, and 9.2% had someone living alone who was 65 years of age or older. The average household size was 2.44 and the average family size was 3.06.

The median age was 37.4 years. 23.6% of residents were under the age of 18; 8.1% were between the ages of 18 and 24; 29.8% were from 25 to 44; 27.4% were from 45 to 64; and 11% were 65 years of age or older. The gender makeup was 49.1% male and 50.9% female.

=== 2000 census ===
At the 2000 census, there were 28,456 people, 11,239 households and 7,530 families. The population density was 994.4 per square mile (383.9/km^{2}). There were 11,897 housing units at an average density of 415.7 per square mile (160.5/km^{2}). The ethnic makeup was 91.96% White, 1.82% African American, 0.59% Native American, 2.39% Asian, 1.70% from other ethnic groups, and 1.53% from two or more ethnic groups. Hispanic or Latino of any race were 4.45% of the population.

There were 11,239 households, of which 33.3% had children under the age of 18 living with them, 56.4% were married couples living together, 7.1% had a female householder with no husband present, and 33.0% were non-families. Of all households, 25.3% were made up of individuals, and 7.0% had someone living alone who was 65 years of age or older. The average household size was 2.52 and the average family size was 3.10.

25.0% of the population were under the age of 18, 9.3% from 18 to 24, 35.4% from 25 to 44, 21.5% from 45 to 64, and 8.9% who were 65 years of age or older. The median age was 34 years. For every 100 females, there were 99.3 males. For every 100 females age 18 and over, there were 97.9 males.

The median household income was $53,779 and the median family income was $63,381. Males had a median income of $43,935 and females $31,443. The per capita income was $23,586. About 1.2% of families and 3.1% of the population were below the poverty line, including 2.2% of those under age 18 and 6.7% of those age 65 or over.

== Economy ==
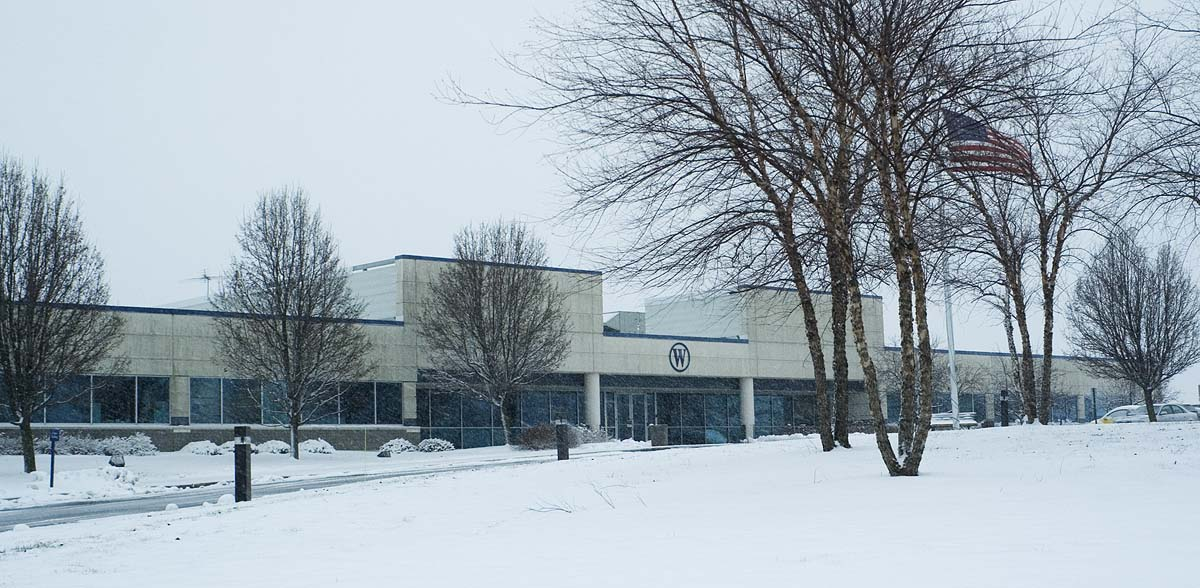
Former Midwest Airlines headquarters, now owned by Bucyrus International

Midwest Airlines's headquarters were located in Oak Creek. In January 2010 Republic Airways, the parent company of Midwest, announced that it would move all Republic executives, including Midwest Airlines executives, to Indianapolis, Indiana.

Mining equipment manufacturer Bucyrus International announced June 22, 2010, that it would move headquarters personnel from South Milwaukee to Midwest Airlines' former headquarters space in Oak Creek. Senior management and other personnel would be moving to the new location making room for additional employees at its South Milwaukee facility. Caterpillar Inc. intends to locate the Caterpillar Mining world headquarters there after its acquisition of Bucyrus International.

The Oak Creek Power Plant is in Oak Creek. The city also hosts a number of small companies, with interests ranging from engineering to agriculture.

In May 2018, the first IKEA in Wisconsin opened its doors in Oak Creek. It is a 290,000-square foot site located directly off I-94.

== Arts and culture ==
The Oak Creek Historical Society is a private organization established in 1964 to preserve the history of Oak Creek. The organization maintains a museum complex consisting of five historic buildings and a gift shop, on the grounds of Forest Hill Memorial Park in Oak Creek.

- Blacksmith Shop: Edgar Wohlust's blacksmith shop was one of only eight in the area. It was built in 1886 and moved to the grounds in 1970.
- Farm Shed: Moved in 1984, it contains farm equipment from the 1830s up to the 1950s.
- Hughes Cabin: Built in the 1840s with an addition in the 1920s, it is one of the oldest buildings still standing in Milwaukee County.
- Summer Kitchen: Moved from the Franke Farm in 1974, this summer kitchen was constructed in 1890.
- Town Hall: The Oak Creek Town Hall, built in 1874, was used until 1963.

== Government ==
Mayors of Oak Creek

- Don Hermann (1974–1985)
- Milo Schocker (1985–1988)
- Christine Bastian (1988–1991) First female elected mayor of a Milwaukee County municipality in the county's history.
- Dale Richards (1991–2003)
- Richard "Dick" Bolender (2003 – December 10, 2011) Until his death.
- Steve Scaffidi (December 11, 2011 – December 22, 2011) Acting mayor due to the December 10 death of Bolender.
- Al Foeckler (December 22, 2011 – April 17, 2012) Appointed mayor to serve the remainder of Bolender's term.
- Steve Scaffidi (April 17, 2012 - February 21, 2017) Scaffidi resigned to host "Scaffidi & Bilstad" on WTMJ 620 Radio.
- Ken Gehl, Common Council President, (February 21, 2017 - March 8, 2017) Acting mayor due to the resignation of Scaffidi.
- Dan Bukiewicz, 2nd District Alderman (March 8, 2017 - April 3, 2018) Appointed by the Common Council until the April 2018 election.
- Dan Bukiewicz (April 3, 2018 - Present)

At the federal level, Oak Creek is located in Wisconsin's 1st congressional district, represented by Republican Bryan Steil.

== Education ==
Oak Creek is part of the Oak Creek Franklin School District.

Elementary schools

- Carollton Elementary: built 1962
- Cedar Hills Elementary: built 1962
- Deerfield Elementary: built 2005
- Edgewood Elementary: built 1962
- Forest Ridge Elementary: built 2016
- Meadowview Elementary: built 1959
- Shepard Hills Elementary: built 1971
- Early Learning Academy

Middle schools

- East Middle School: built 1965, torn down and rebuilt 2008
- West Middle School: built 1991

High schools

- 9th Grade Center: built 2017
- Oak Creek High School: built 1962 and renovated 2002

Private schools

- Grace Lutheran Church and School
- Saint Matthew Catholic School

== Infrastructure ==
=== Transportation and transit ===
According to Walk Score, Oak Creek is a largely "car dependent" city, with an overall walk score of 21/100 and it has "minimal biking infrastructure", with an overall bike score of 40/100.

Oak Creek is serviced by the Milwaukee County Transit System routes 40, 80, 219 and the PurpleLine.

The city shares a border with General Mitchell International Airport in Milwaukee. In the metro Milwaukee area, three Class 1 railroads deliver freight. For passenger transport, Amtrak’s Hiawatha service connects General Mitchell International Airport to the heart of Chicago.

=== Healthcare ===
Oak Creek is served by a range of healthcare facilities, including hospitals, clinics, and urgent care centers. The city is home to Froedtert Community Hospital – Oak Creek, a small inpatient facility offering 24/7 emergency services, diagnostic imaging, and pharmacy care. Adjacent to the hospital is the Drexel Town Square Health Center, which provides primary care, urgent care, specialty services, outpatient surgery, and lab work.

Additional outpatient services are offered by Aurora Health Care, including family medicine, behavioral health, and urgent care. Ascension Medical Group also operates a primary care clinic in the city, and Children’s Wisconsin maintains a pediatric clinic. Diagnostic imaging is available through Froedtert RAYUS Radiology.

For more advanced or specialized care, residents often utilize nearby full-service hospitals in Franklin and Milwaukee, such as Ascension SE Wisconsin Hospital – Franklin and Aurora St. Luke’s South Shore. Public health services are coordinated by the Oak Creek Health Department, which provides immunizations, screenings, and community health programs.

=== Public safety ===
The Oak Creek Police Department is responsible for the city's law enforcement since September 11, 1956.

== Notable people ==
- Brian Calhoun, Oak Creek high school athletic star, was on the 2006–2008 Detroit Lions of the National Football League
- Adin P. Hobart, Wisconsin State Representative and Postmaster of Oak Creek
- Mark Honadel, welder, businessman and state representative; grew up in Oak Creek and graduated from OCHS
- John Matuszak, National Football League player and actor, born and grew up in Oak Creek
- John Ruan, Irish-born pioneer farmer who served in the Wisconsin State Assembly, on the town board of Oak Creek, and as superintendent of schools for Milwaukee County
- Luke Scanlan, Wisconsin State Representative and chairman of the Oak Creek Town Board, lived in Oak Creek
- Cathy Stepp, businesswoman, member of the Wisconsin State Assembly, and Secretary of the Wisconsin Department of Natural Resources; graduated from OCHS
- William M. Williams Jr., Wisconsin State Representative and Postmaster of Oak Creek
