= Lynx Air =

Ultra-low-cost airline of Canada (2006–2024)

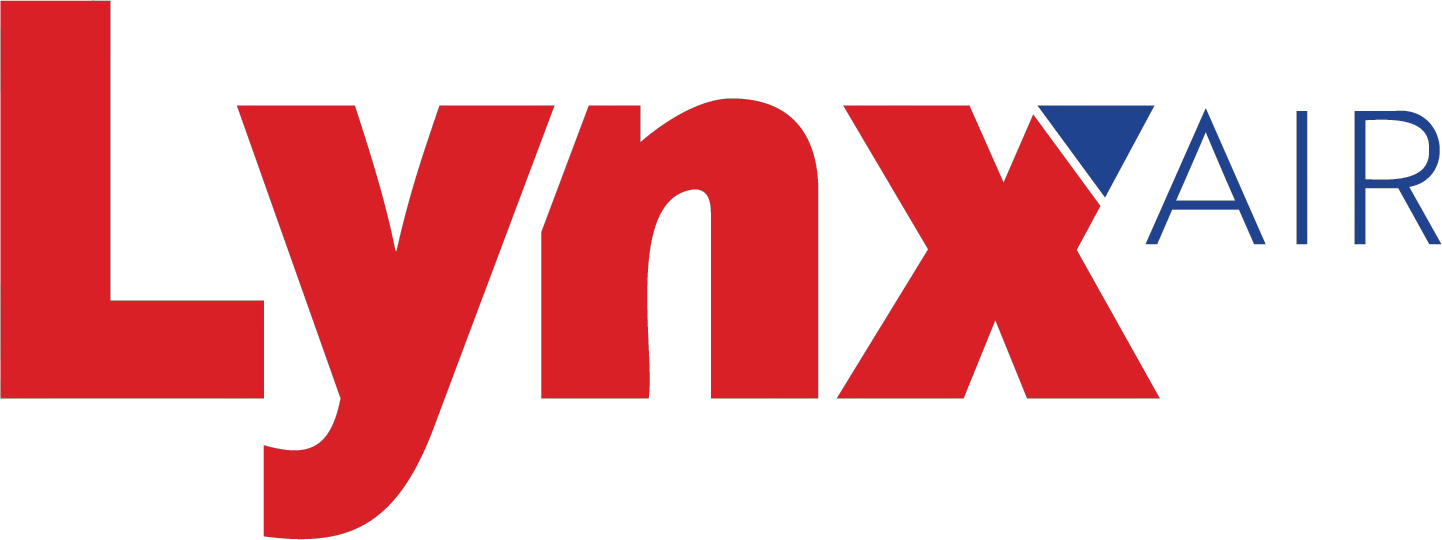

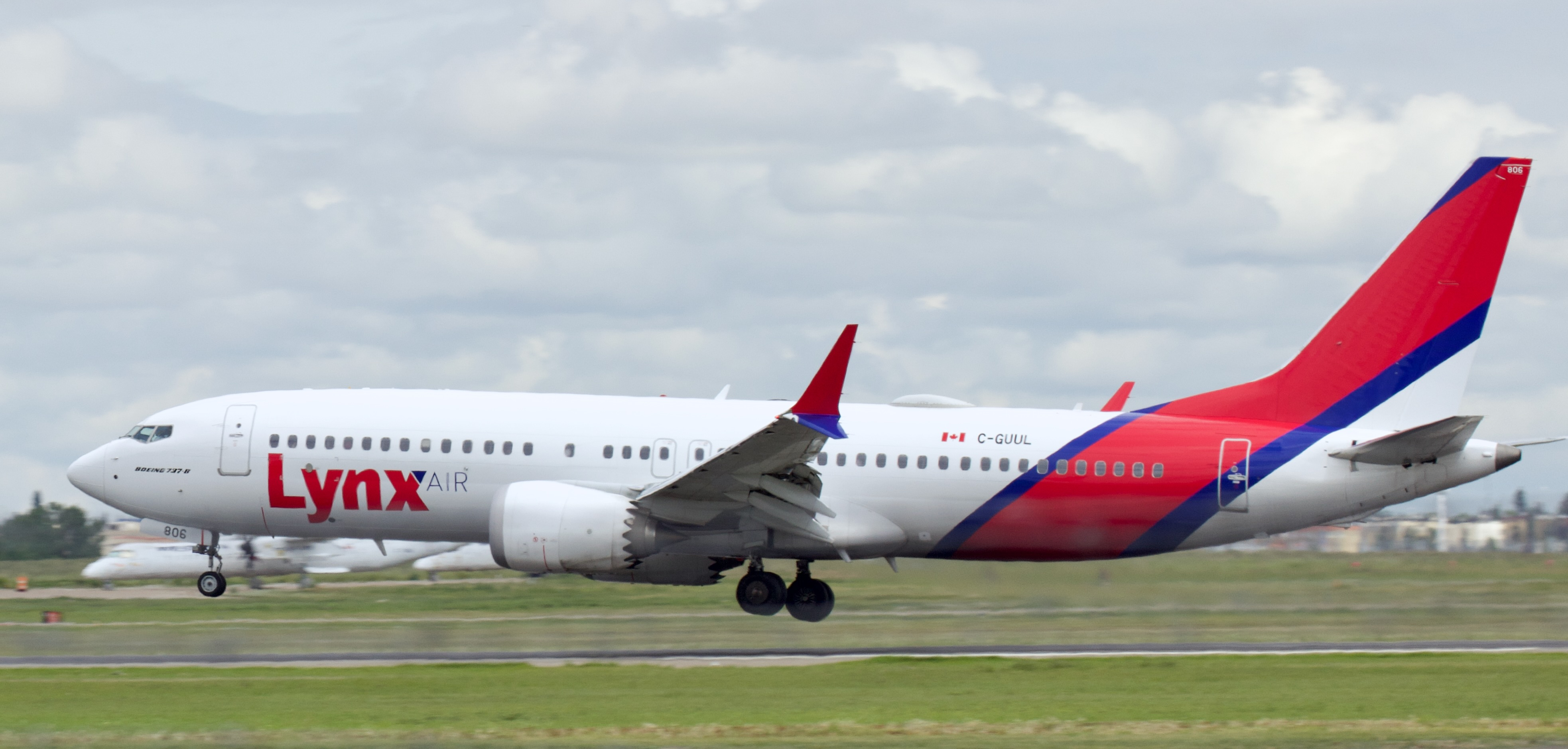
- Lynx Air Boeing 737 MAX 8 taking off from Calgary International Airport in 2023
IATA	ICAO	Call sign
Y9	DAT	DAUNTLESS
- Founded: 2006 (as New Air & Tours); October 20, 2008 (as Enerjet); November 16, 2021 (as Lynx Air)
- Commenced operations: April 7, 2022 (as Lynx Air)
- Ceased operations: February 26, 2024
- AOC #: 15852
- Operating bases: Calgary; Toronto–Pearson
- Fleet size: 9
- Destinations: 17
- Headquarters: Calgary, Alberta, Canada
- Key people: Merren McArthur (President & CEO)
- Website: www.flylynx.com/en

Lynx Air, legally incorporated as 1263343 Alberta Inc., was a Canadian ultra-low-cost carrier based in Calgary, Alberta. It previously operated as Enerjet and was rebranded as Lynx Air on November 16, 2021. The first flight under the Lynx Air name took place on April 7, 2022, operating from Calgary International Airport to Vancouver International Airport.

On February 22, 2024, the airline announced it had entered creditor protection and ceased operations on February 26, 2024, at 12:00 AM Mountain Time.

== History ==
=== Enerjet ===
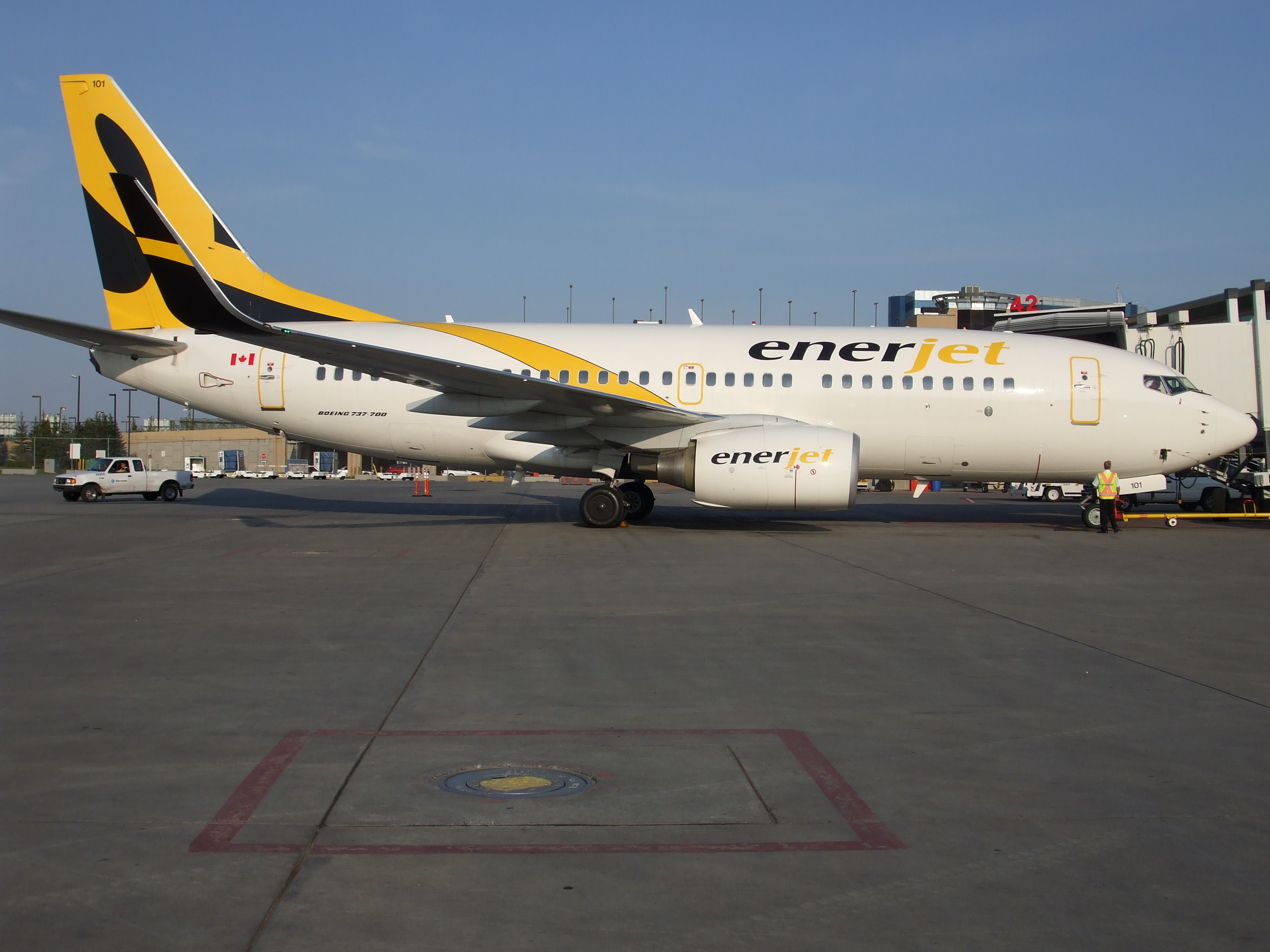
Enerjet Boeing 737-700 at Calgary International Airport (2009)

Enerjet was originally formed in 2006 by a small group of entrepreneurs addressing what they perceived to be a gap in the service provided by Canada's major airlines, WestJet and Air Canada in "middle Canada". It was initially known as New Air & Tours until October 20, 2008, when New Air & Tours revealed its name and corporate logo to be styled as Enerjet. Enerjet was founded by nine individuals, including Tim Morgan, the former senior vice president of WestJet. On November 28, 2008, Enerjet received an air operator's certificate (AOC) and Air Operator License issued by the Canadian Transportation Agency. While the airline initially planned to launch as a scheduled low-cost carrier (LCC), the airline focused instead on charter operations involving the transport of employees of oil companies, such as for Suncor Energy, as well as ad-hoc charter services for Air Transat, deeming the leisure travel market to be competitive following the collapse of Zoom Airlines, as well as the presence of leisure carriers such as WestJet.

By 2012, the airline was still seeking investment to expand into scheduled LCC operations, and had operated some flights between Calgary and Vancouver during peak holiday travel periods, with plans to expand the services to Kelowna and Edmonton. In 2015, Enerjet signed an agreement to acquire 46 Boeing 737 MAX 8 aircraft, 40 purchased and 6 leased. By 2016, the airline had gone through two tentative names for its LCC project, consisting of Jet Naked and FlyToo. In late 2018, the airline announced it had attracted investors in order to transition from chartered flights to scheduled operations, one of which included American private equity firm Indigo Partners, which had notably invested in other LCCs including Frontier Airlines, JetSmart, Volaris, and Wizz Air, and Enerjet subsequently planned to relaunch as an LCC during 2019. The launch of the airline was delayed due to the Boeing 737 MAX groundings and the impact of the COVID-19 pandemic on commercial air transport.

=== Lynx Air ===
On November 16, 2021, the company revealed its new name as Lynx Air, with plans to begin flying in the first quarter of 2022. During the announcement, the airline made commitments for up to 46 Boeing 737 MAX 8 aircraft over the next seven years to meet the anticipated demand, with deliveries starting in early 2022, and that it would follow the low-cost carrier model for its operations. The airline additionally announced it would initially operate domestic routes with plans to add international destinations later. On April 7, 2022, Lynx Air's first flights launched. The airline announced its first international destinations on September 28, 2022, with flights to the United States beginning in early 2023.

On February 22, 2024, Lynx filed for creditor protection from the Court of King's Bench of Alberta and announced it would cease operations on February 26 due to financial issues, citing escalating costs and increased airport fees as contributing factors.

== Management ==
Merren McArthur was the airline's president and chief executive officer (CEO). She announced her departure in June 2023, but remained in her role until September 2023 to allow the company time to find her replacement. She previously served as CEO for both Tigerair Australia and Virgin Australia Regional Airlines, and founding CEO of Virgin Australia Cargo. Vijay Bathija was the airline's Chief Commercial Officer (CCO), with prior experience at Etihad Airways and Air Canada Rouge. James "Jim" Sullivan was the Chief Operating Officer (COO) of the airline, who was formerly Vice President of Flight Operations at JetBlue. Mike Woodward was the airline's Chief Financial Officer (CFO), with previous experience in the Energy and Banking Sector. Mike has previously served as the CFO of Campus Energy Partners and Vice President of BMO Capital Markets.

== Destinations ==
Lynx Air flew (or planned to fly) to the following destinations by the time of its announced shutdown in February 2024. It does not include destinations solely operated to by charter flights, such as those under its previous Enerjet name.

Country	Region	City	Airport	Start date	End date	Notes	Refs
Canada	Alberta	Calgary	Calgary International Airport	April 7, 2022	February 26, 2024	Terminated	
Canada	Alberta	Edmonton	Edmonton International Airport	July 14, 2022	February 26, 2024	Terminated	
Canada	British Columbia	Kelowna	Kelowna International Airport	April 15, 2022	February 26, 2024	Terminated	
Canada	British Columbia	Vancouver	Vancouver International Airport	April 7, 2022	February 26, 2024	Terminated	
Canada	British Columbia	Victoria	Victoria International Airport	May 12, 2022	January 14, 2023	Terminated	
Canada	Manitoba	Winnipeg	Winnipeg James Armstrong Richardson International Airport	April 19, 2022	February 26, 2024	Terminated	
Canada	New Brunswick	Fredericton	Fredericton International Airport	June 12, 2023	February 26, 2024	Seasonal	
Canada	Newfoundland and Labrador	St. John's	St. John's International Airport	June 28, 2022	February 26, 2024	Seasonal	
Canada	Nova Scotia	Halifax	Halifax Stanfield International Airport	June 29, 2022	February 26, 2024	Terminated	
Canada	Ontario	Hamilton	John C. Munro Hamilton International Airport	June 29, 2022	February 26, 2024	Terminated	
Canada	Ontario	Ottawa	Ottawa Macdonald–Cartier International Airport	May 17, 2024	—	Planned	
Canada	Ontario	Toronto	Toronto Pearson International Airport	April 11, 2022	February 26, 2024	Base	
Canada	Prince Edward Island	Charlottetown	Charlottetown Airport	May 30, 2024	—	Planned	
Canada	Quebec	Montreal	Montréal–Trudeau International Airport	June 5, 2023	February 26, 2024	Terminated	
Canada	Quebec	Quebec City	Québec City Jean Lesage International Airport	June 6, 2024	—	Planned	
Canada	Saskatchewan	Regina	Regina International Airport	June 20, 2024	—	Planned	
Mexico	Quintana Roo	Cancún	Cancún International Airport	February 15, 2024	February 26, 2024	Terminated	
United States	Arizona	Phoenix	Phoenix Sky Harbor International Airport	February 7, 2023	February 26, 2024	Seasonal	
United States	California	Los Angeles	Los Angeles International Airport	February 16, 2023	February 26, 2024	Terminated	
United States	California	San Francisco	San Francisco International Airport	May 3, 2024	—	Planned	
United States	Florida	Fort Myers	Southwest Florida International Airport	December 14, 2023	February 26, 2024	Terminated	
United States	Florida	Orlando	Orlando International Airport	January 27, 2023	February 26, 2024	Terminated	
United States	Florida	Tampa	Tampa International Airport	November 16, 2023	February 26, 2024	Terminated	
United States	Massachusetts	Boston	Logan International Airport	March 28, 2024	—	Planned	
United States	Nevada	Las Vegas	Harry Reid International Airport	February 24, 2023	February 26, 2024	Terminated	

== Fleet ==
=== Current ===
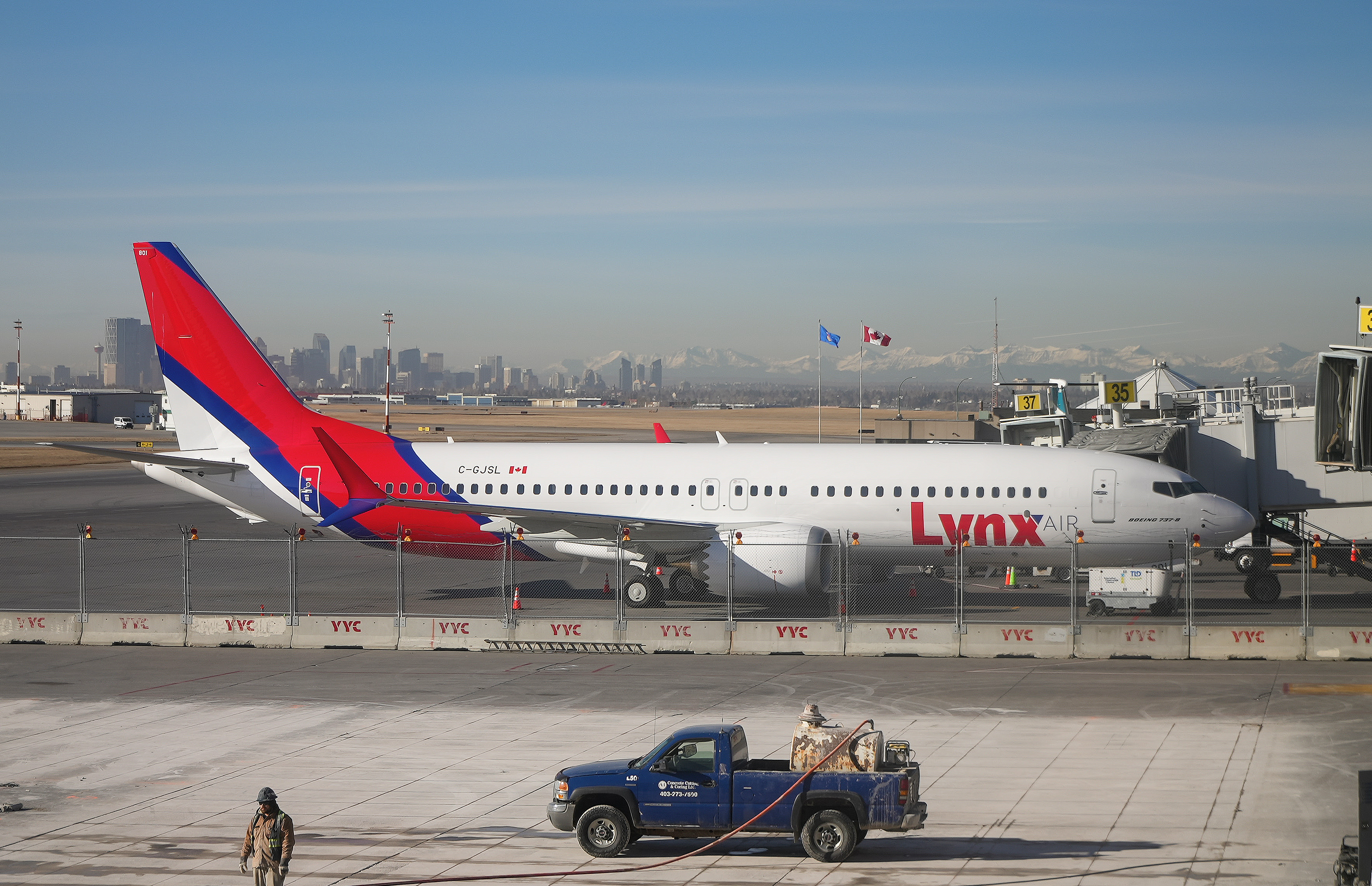
Boeing 737 MAX 8

At the time of shutdown, Lynx Air operated the following aircraft:

Lynx Air former fleet
Aircraft	Used	Orders	Passengers	Notes
Boeing 737 MAX 8	9	17	189	Aircraft returned to lessor and resumed service with WestJet. Certain non delivered orders taken by Air Canada while in possession with Boeing.
Boeing 737 MAX 200	—	20	TBA	Not delivered before shutdown.
Total	9	37		

=== Previous ===
As Enerjet, the airline previously operated the following aircraft:

Enerjet former fleet
Aircraft	Total	Introduced	Retired	Notes
Boeing 737-700	7	2008	2017	
Boeing 737-800	1	2011	2011	Leased from Transavia.
Boeing 737-800	1	2013	2014	Leased from Transavia.
De Havilland Canada DHC-6 Twin Otter	2	2018	2020	
Piper PA-30 Twin Comanche	1	2011	2012	
Airbus A320-200	1	2023 (summer)	2023 (summer)	Leased from Global Crossing Airlines.

=== Fleet development ===
As Enerjet, the airline operated a fleet of Boeing 737-700 aircraft for its charter operations, with a single 737-800 leased from Transavia on occasion, before the 737-700s were retired by 2017. After retiring its 737-700s, Enerjet subsequently retained an inactive DHC-6 Twin Otter fleet in order to keep its AOC, while the airline underwent its subsequent transformation from chartered to scheduled operations in the coming years. When the airline eventually announced its rebranding as Lynx Air in November 2021, the airline announced that it had ordered 46 Boeing 737 MAX 8 aircraft for delivery through 2028. In March 2022, the airline announced it had leased an additional 11 737 MAX 8s from BOC Aviation.

== See also ==
- List of airlines of Canada
- List of defunct airlines of Canada
