= List of Frontier Airlines destinations =

This is a list of destinations that Frontier Airlines serves or has previously served as of July 2025. It does not include destinations served by a codeshare agreement with Volaris, or via charter flights on behalf of Apple Vacations and Fun Jet Vacations.

== Destinations ==
Country (State/Province) or Territory	City	Airport	Notes	Refs
Antigua and Barbuda	St. John's	V. C. Bird International Airport	Terminated	
Aruba	Oranjestad	Queen Beatrix International Airport		
Bahamas	Nassau	Lynden Pindling International Airport	Terminated	
Barbados	Bridgetown	Grantley Adams International Airport	Terminated	
Belize	Belize City	Philip S. W. Goldson International Airport	Terminated	
Canada (Alberta)	Calgary	Calgary International Airport	Terminated	
Canada (British Columbia)	Vancouver	Vancouver International Airport	Terminated	
Costa Rica	Liberia	Guanacaste Airport	Terminated	
Costa Rica	San José	Juan Santamaría International Airport		
Cuba	Havana	José Martí International Airport	Terminated	
Dominican Republic	Puerto Plata	Gregorio Luperón International Airport	Terminated	
Dominican Republic	Punta Cana	Punta Cana International Airport		
Dominican Republic	Santiago de los Caballeros	Cibao International Airport		
Dominican Republic	Santo Domingo	Las Américas International Airport		
El Salvador	San Salvador	El Salvador International Airport		
Guatemala	Guatemala City	La Aurora International Airport		
Honduras	San Pedro Sula	Ramón Villeda Morales International Airport		
Jamaica	Kingston	Norman Manley International Airport	Terminated	
Jamaica	Montego Bay	Sangster International Airport		
Mexico (Baja California Sur)	San José del Cabo	Los Cabos International Airport		
Mexico (Guerrero)	Ixtapa/Zihuatanejo	Ixtapa-Zihuatanejo International Airport	Terminated	
Mexico (Jalisco)	Puerto Vallarta	Licenciado Gustavo Díaz Ordaz International Airport		
Mexico (Nuevo León)	Monterrey	Monterrey International Airport	Terminated	
Mexico (Oaxaca)	Huatulco	Bahías de Huatulco International Airport	Terminated	
Mexico (Quintana Roo)	Cancún	Cancún International Airport		
Mexico (Quintana Roo)	Cozumel	Cozumel International Airport	Terminated	
Mexico (Sinaloa)	Mazatlán	Mazatlán International Airport	Terminated	
Puerto Rico	Aguadilla	Rafael Hernández Airport		
Puerto Rico	Ponce	Mercedita International Airport		
Puerto Rico	San Juan	Luis Muñoz Marín International Airport	Base	
Sint Maarten	Philipsburg	Princess Juliana International Airport	Terminated	
Trinidad and Tobago	Port of Spain	Piarco International Airport	Terminated	
Turks and Caicos Islands	Providenciales	Providenciales International Airport	Terminated	
United States (Alabama)	Birmingham	Birmingham–Shuttlesworth International Airport	Terminated	
United States (Alabama)	Huntsville	Huntsville International Airport	Terminated	
United States (Alabama)	Mobile	Mobile Downtown Airport	Terminated	
United States (Alaska)	Anchorage	Ted Stevens Anchorage International Airport	Terminated	
United States (Alaska)	Fairbanks	Fairbanks International Airport	Terminated	
United States (Arizona)	Phoenix	Phoenix–Mesa Gateway Airport	Terminated	
United States (Arizona)	Phoenix	Phoenix Sky Harbor International Airport	Base	
United States (Arizona)	Tucson	Tucson International Airport		
United States (Arkansas)	Fayetteville	Northwest Arkansas National Airport		
United States (Arkansas)	Little Rock	Clinton National Airport		
United States (California)	Bakersfield	Meadows Field Airport	Terminated	
United States (California)	Burbank	Hollywood Burbank Airport		
United States (California)	Fresno	Fresno Yosemite International Airport	Terminated	
United States (California)	Los Angeles	Los Angeles International Airport		
United States (California)	Oakland	Oakland San Francisco Bay Airport		
United States (California)	Ontario	Ontario International Airport		
United States (California)	Palm Springs	Palm Springs International Airport	Terminated	
United States (California)	Sacramento	Sacramento International Airport		
United States (California)	San Diego	San Diego International Airport		
United States (California)	San Francisco	San Francisco International Airport		
United States (California)	San Jose	San Jose International Airport		
United States (California)	Santa Ana	John Wayne Airport		
United States (California)	Santa Barbara	Santa Barbara Municipal Airport	Terminated	
United States (Colorado)	Colorado Springs	Colorado Springs Airport	Terminated	
United States (Colorado)	Denver	Denver International Airport	Base	
United States (Colorado)	Denver	Stapleton International Airport	Airport Closed	
United States (Colorado)	Durango	Durango–La Plata County Airport	Terminated	
United States (Colorado)	Eagle/Vail	Eagle County Regional Airport	Terminated	
United States (Colorado)	Grand Junction	Grand Junction Regional Airport	Terminated	
United States (Connecticut)	Hartford	Bradley International Airport		
United States (Delaware)	Wilmington	Wilmington Airport	Terminated	
United States (District of Columbia)	Washington, D.C.	Dulles International Airport		
United States (District of Columbia)	Washington, D.C.	Ronald Reagan Washington National Airport		
United States (Florida)	Fort Lauderdale	Fort Lauderdale–Hollywood International Airport		
United States (Florida)	Fort Myers	Southwest Florida International Airport		
United States (Florida)	Jacksonville	Jacksonville International Airport		
United States (Florida)	Miami	Miami International Airport	Base	
United States (Florida)	Orlando	Orlando International Airport	Base	
United States (Florida)	Pensacola	Pensacola International Airport		
United States (Florida)	Punta Gorda	Punta Gorda Airport	Terminated	
United States (Florida)	Sarasota	Sarasota–Bradenton International Airport		
United States (Florida)	St. Augustine	Northeast Florida Regional Airport	Terminated	
United States (Florida)	Tampa	Tampa International Airport	Base	
United States (Florida)	West Palm Beach	President Donald J. Trump International Airport		
United States (Georgia)	Atlanta	Hartsfield–Jackson Atlanta International Airport	Base	
United States (Georgia)	Savannah	Savannah/Hilton Head International Airport	Terminated	
United States (Idaho)	Boise	Boise Airport		
United States (Idaho)	Idaho Falls	Idaho Falls Regional Airport	Terminated	
United States (Illinois)	Bloomington/Normal	Central Illinois Regional Airport	Terminated	
United States (Illinois)	Chicago	Chicago Rockford International Airport	Terminated	
United States (Illinois)	Chicago	Midway International Airport	Base	
United States (Illinois)	Chicago	O'Hare International Airport	Base	
United States (Indiana)	Indianapolis	Indianapolis International Airport		
United States (Indiana)	South Bend	South Bend International Airport	Terminated	
United States (Iowa)	Cedar Rapids	The Eastern Iowa Airport		
United States (Iowa)	Des Moines	Des Moines International Airport		
United States (Iowa)	Sioux City	Sioux Gateway Airport	Terminated	
United States (Kansas)	Wichita	Wichita Dwight D. Eisenhower National Airport	Terminated	
United States (Kentucky)	Louisville	Louisville Muhammad Ali International Airport	Terminated	
United States (Louisiana)	Lafayette	Lafayette Regional Airport	Terminated	
United States (Louisiana)	New Orleans	Louis Armstrong New Orleans International Airport		
United States (Maine)	Portland	Portland International Jetport	Terminated	
United States (Maryland)	Baltimore	Baltimore/Washington International Airport		
United States (Massachusetts)	Boston	Logan International Airport		
United States (Michigan)	Detroit	Detroit Metropolitan Wayne County Airport		
United States (Michigan)	Grand Rapids	Gerald R. Ford International Airport		
United States (Minnesota)	Minneapolis/Saint Paul	Minneapolis–Saint Paul International Airport		
United States (Mississippi)	Jackson	Jackson–Medgar Wiley Evers International Airport	Terminated	
United States (Missouri)	Branson	Branson Airport	Terminated	
United States (Missouri)	Columbia	Columbia Regional Airport	Terminated	
United States (Missouri)	Kansas City	Kansas City International Airport		
United States (Missouri)	St. Louis	St. Louis Lambert International Airport		
United States (Montana)	Billings	Billings Logan International Airport	Terminated	
United States (Montana)	Great Falls	Great Falls International Airport	Terminated	
United States (Montana)	Missoula	Missoula International Airport	Terminated	
United States (Nebraska)	Omaha	Eppley Airfield		
United States (Nevada)	Las Vegas	Harry Reid International Airport	Base	
United States (Nevada)	Reno	Reno–Tahoe International Airport		
United States (New Hampshire)	Portsmouth	Portsmouth International Airport at Pease	Terminated	
United States (New Jersey)	Newark	Newark Liberty International Airport		
United States (New Jersey)	Trenton	Trenton–Mercer Airport	Base	
United States (New Mexico)	Albuquerque	Albuquerque International Sunport	Terminated	
United States (New York)	Albany	Albany International Airport	Terminated	
United States (New York)	Buffalo	Buffalo Niagara International Airport		
United States (New York)	Islip	Long Island MacArthur Airport		
United States (New York)	New York City	John F. Kennedy International Airport	Terminated	
United States (New York)	New York City	LaGuardia Airport		
United States (New York)	Newburgh	Stewart International Airport	Terminated	
United States (New York)	Rochester	Greater Rochester International Airport	Terminated	
United States (New York)	Syracuse	Syracuse Hancock International Airport		
United States (North Carolina)	Charlotte	Charlotte Douglas International Airport		
United States (North Carolina)	Greensboro	Piedmont Triad International Airport	Terminated	
United States (North Carolina)	Raleigh/Durham	Raleigh–Durham International Airport		
United States (North Dakota)	Bismarck	Bismarck Municipal Airport	Terminated	
United States (North Dakota)	Fargo	Hector International Airport		
United States (North Dakota)	Grand Forks	Grand Forks International Airport	Terminated	
United States (North Dakota)	Minot	Minot International Airport	Terminated	
United States (Ohio)	Akron/Canton	Akron–Canton Airport	Terminated	
United States (Ohio)	Cincinnati/Covington	Cincinnati/Northern Kentucky International Airport	Base	
United States (Ohio)	Cleveland	Cleveland Hopkins International Airport	Base	
United States (Ohio)	Columbus	John Glenn Columbus International Airport		
United States (Ohio)	Dayton	Dayton International Airport	Terminated	
United States (Oklahoma)	Oklahoma City	OKC Will Rogers International Airport		
United States (Oklahoma)	Tulsa	Tulsa International Airport	Terminated	
United States (Oregon)	Eugene	Eugene Airport	Terminated	
United States (Oregon)	Portland	Portland International Airport		
United States (Pennsylvania)	Allentown	Lehigh Valley International Airport	Terminated	
United States (Pennsylvania)	Harrisburg	Harrisburg International Airport	Terminated	
United States (Pennsylvania)	Philadelphia	Philadelphia International Airport	Base	
United States (Pennsylvania)	Pittsburgh	Pittsburgh International Airport		
United States (Rhode Island)	Providence	Rhode Island T. F. Green International Airport	Terminated	
United States (South Carolina)	Charleston	Charleston International Airport		
United States (South Carolina)	Greenville/Spartanburg	Greenville–Spartanburg International Airport	Terminated	
United States (South Carolina)	Myrtle Beach	Myrtle Beach International Airport		
United States (South Dakota)	Sioux Falls	Sioux Falls Regional Airport		
United States (Tennessee)	Knoxville	McGhee Tyson Airport		
United States (Tennessee)	Memphis	Memphis International Airport		
United States (Tennessee)	Nashville	Nashville International Airport		
United States (Texas)	Austin	Austin–Bergstrom International Airport		
United States (Texas)	Corpus Christi	Corpus Christi International Airport		
United States (Texas)	Dallas/Fort Worth	Dallas Fort Worth International Airport	Base	
United States (Texas)	El Paso	El Paso International Airport		
United States (Texas)	Harlingen	Valley International Airport	Terminated	
United States (Texas)	Houston	George Bush Intercontinental Airport		
United States (Texas)	Houston	William P. Hobby Airport		
United States (Texas)	San Antonio	San Antonio International Airport		
United States (Texas)	Tyler	Tyler Pounds Regional Airport	Terminated	
United States (Utah)	Salt Lake City	Salt Lake City International Airport		
United States (Vermont)	Burlington	Patrick Leahy Burlington International Airport	Terminated	
United States (Virginia)	Newport News	Newport News/Williamsburg International Airport	Terminated	
United States (Virginia)	Norfolk	Norfolk International Airport		
United States (Virginia)	Richmond	Richmond International Airport		
United States (Washington)	Bellingham	Bellingham International Airport	Terminated	
United States (Washington)	Everett	Paine Field	Terminated	
United States (Washington)	Seattle/Tacoma	Seattle–Tacoma International Airport		
United States (Washington)	Spokane	Spokane International Airport		
United States (Wisconsin)	Green Bay	Green Bay–Austin Straubel International Airport	Terminated	
United States (Wisconsin)	Madison	Dane County Regional Airport		
United States (Wisconsin)	Milwaukee	Milwaukee Mitchell International Airport		
United States Virgin Islands	Saint Croix	Henry E. Rohlsen Airport	Terminated	
United States Virgin Islands	Saint Thomas	Cyril E. King Airport	Terminated	
