= Indigo Partners =

American private equity firm

- Type: Private equity firm
- Industry: Private equity
- Founded: 2002; 24 years ago
- Founder: Bill Franke
- Headquarters: Phoenix, Arizona, United States
- Key people: Bill Franke
- Products: Low cost airlines
- Subsidiaries: Frontier Airlines; JetSmart
- Website: www.indigohq.com

Indigo Partners, LLC is an American private equity firm which has a controlling interest in the American Frontier Airlines and Chilean low-cost JetSmart, as well as holding stakes in Mexican budget airline Volaris and European (Hungarian) low-cost carrier Wizz Air. The company had a partnership with Enerjet when it launched the now defunct Canadian ultra-low-cost carrier Lynx Air.

Indigo Partners was founded by Bill Franke and has set up a number of low-cost airlines around the world. It is headquartered in Phoenix, Arizona.

== History ==
At the November 2017 Dubai Air Show, Indigo Partners signed a memorandum of understanding for 430 Airbus Aircraft: 273 A320neos and 157 A321neos for $49.5 billion at list prices: 146 aircraft will go to Wizz Air, 134 to Frontier Airlines, 80 to Volaris and 70 to JetSmart. Wizz will get 72 A320neo and 74 A321neo, Frontier 100 A320neo and 34 A321neo, Volaris 46 A320neo and 34 A321neo and JetSmart 56 A320neo and 14 A321neo.

Deliveries began in 2021, but most were delivered in 2025-26 from Toulouse, France and Mobile, Alabama, U.S. Wizz Air previously ordered 110 A321neos at the 2015 Paris Airshow and its fleet will grow to 300 aircraft by 2025. Frontier received its first Airbus from Mobile in 2018 and its fleet will triple to 200, flying 50 million passengers in 2026.

On November 29, 2018, Indigo Partners reached a preliminary agreement to buy Icelandic low-cost carrier WOW Air after Icelandair Group dropped its takeover. However, on March 22, 2019, it was reported that Indigo Partners had withdrawn their offer to purchase Wow Air.

On November 14, 2021, Indigo Partners ordered 255 A321s.

In 2022, Indigo Partners attempted to merge its majority-owned Frontier subsidiary with fellow US-based low cost carrier Spirit Airlines. The planned merger with Spirit fell apart as JetBlue offered an all-cash offer of $3.7 billion which was higher than Frontier's offer of more than $2.6 billion in stock and cash.

In 2023, Indigo Partners was involved in a US$50 million investment in CleanJoule, a United States-based sustainable aviation fuel developer. The investment consortium included the principals of Indigo Partners, GenZero, Cleanhill Partners, and three Indigo-linked airlines: Frontier Airlines, Wizz Air and Volaris. As part of the transaction, the three airlines signed binding agreements to purchase up to 90 million US gallons of sustainable aviation fuel from CleanJoule.

In February 2024, Canadian low-cost carrier Lynx Air sought and obtained creditor protection under the Companies' Creditors Arrangement Act and announced that it would cease operations effective February 26, 2024. Lynx owed C$124.3 million to Indigo Partners and Indigo owned one-quarter of Lynx at the time of the filing.
