= Heritage in Flight Museum =

- Location within Illinois
- Established: 1981
- Location: Lincoln, Illinois, US
- Coordinates: 40.1591°N 89.3372°W
- Type: Aviation museum
- Founders: Gerald Oliver, Jr.
- Website: www.heritage-in-flight.org

The Heritage in Flight Museum is an aviation museum located at the Logan County Airport in Lincoln, Illinois.

== History ==
The museum was founded by Gerald Oliver, Jr. in 1981 at Capital Airport in Springfield, Illinois around plans to restore a B-25 using parts recovered from Alabama. It briefly included a second chapter in Bloomington, before that organization split off to form the Prairie Aviation Museum in 1983. Following the separation, in 1985 it began negotiating for the lease of a hangar at the Logan County Airport.

In 1987, the museum was given a 2,000 sq ft (190 m^{2}) World War II barracks that had been moved to the airport from Camp Ellis years before and began renovating it. An F-4B located at Chanute Air Force Base was flown to the museum as a sling load underneath a helicopter in 1991. The B-25 project, which had been brought with the museum after its move, was eventually sold in 1994.

After learning it would be receiving a grant, the museum announced plans to upgrade its building in 2013.

== Exhibits ==
Exhibits at the museum include a searchlight.

== Collection ==
- Beechcraft UC-45F Expeditor
- Bell TH-13T Sioux
- Bell UH-1H Iroquois
- Lockheed T-33A
- LTV A-7E Corsair II
- McDonnell F-4B Phantom II

== See also ==
- Prairie Aviation Museum
