= Bill Franke =

Chairman of Wizz Air and Frontier Airlines

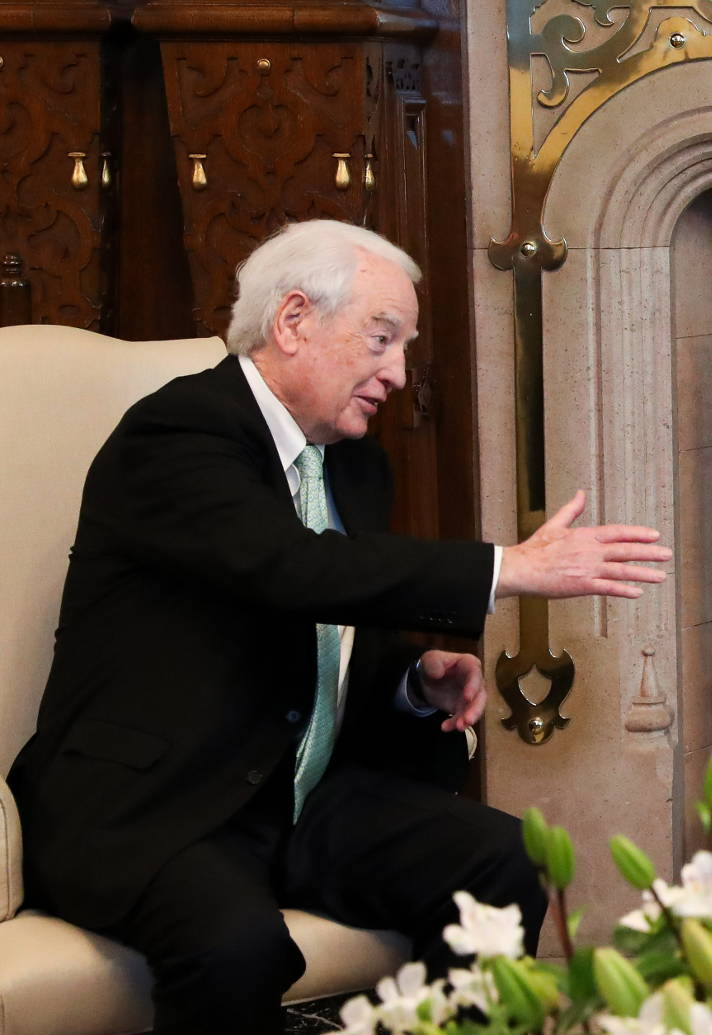
- Born: William Augustus Franke; 15 April 1937 (age 89); Bryan, Texas, U.S.
- Education: Stanford University (BA, LLB)
- Occupation: Businessman
- Title: Chairman, Wizz Air and Frontier Airlines
- Spouse: Carolyn Franke
- Children: 5

William Augustus Franke (born April 15, 1937) is an American airline investor who is a co-founder and Managing Partner of Indigo Partners LLC, a private equity fund focused in air transportation. He has been the President at Franke and Company, Inc. since 1987. Franke has been Chairman of Wizz Air since 2004, as well as Chairman of Frontier Airlines since 2013. He also is the President and Chairman of Bristol Group SA.

== Education and early career ==
Franke graduated from Stanford University with a BA in history in 1959 and an LL.B. in Law in 1961. In his early career he was the CEO of a Fortune 500 forest products company, Southwest Forest Industries (now Smurfit-Stone Container) and chairman of Circle K, which he restructured through bankruptcy. He was chairman and CEO of America West Airlines from 1993 to 2001, chairman of Singapore-based Tiger Airways from 2004 to 2009, and chairman of Spirit Airlines from July 2006 to August 2013.

== Philanthropy ==
He was awarded an honorary doctorate from Northern Arizona University in 2008. Following a $25 million donation, the institution renamed its business school the W.A. Franke College of Business in his honor. In 2016, he made a donation of $24 million to the University of Montana. He has also donated to his alma mater Stanford Law School to create The W. A. Franke Professorship in Law and Business. In 2021, he donated $25 million to the University of Arizona to be put towards scholarships, housing stipends, and study abroad programs for honors students; the Honors College was thus renamed the W.A. Franke Honors College.

According to Forbes, Franke has a net worth of US$1.2 billion as of August 2026.
