= Prairie Aviation Museum =

- Location within Illinois
- Location: Bloomington, Illinois
- Coordinates: 40.488°N 88.926°W
- Type: Aviation museum
- Founder: Norm Wingler
- Website: www.prairieaviationmuseum.org

The Prairie Aviation Museum is an aviation museum located at Central Illinois Regional Airport in Bloomington, Illinois.

== History ==
In 1982, a group of aviation enthusiasts led by Norm Wingler established the Gooney Bird Chapter of the Heritage in Flight Museum with the goal of acquiring and restoring a Douglas DC-3. However, due to legal and financial concerns the chapter decided to form the independent Prairie Aviation Museum in 1983. The following year, the museum purchased a Douglas C-53 Skytrooper at an auction in Rockdale, Texas and flew it back to Indiana. To complement the new acquisition, construction began on a 2,592 sq ft (240.8 m^{2}) building in 1988.

The museum opened a new exhibit featuring oral history interviews with World War II veterans in 1995.

The museum's C-53 was added to the National Register of Historic Places in 1996. The historic designation was intended to help the museum qualify for funds that could be used to construct a new building.

The museum opened a Challenger Learning Center in the former airport terminal in 2003, but was forced to transfer operations to the Heartland Community College due to a financial shortfall. Further complications ensued and in 2009 the museum was forced to sell its DC-3, as it could no longer afford to maintain it in airworthy condition. The museum again began developing a focus on space in 2010 and as part of this effort renovated the building in 2015.

== Exhibits ==
Exhibits at the museum include an airport beacon and a Link Trainer.

== Collection ==
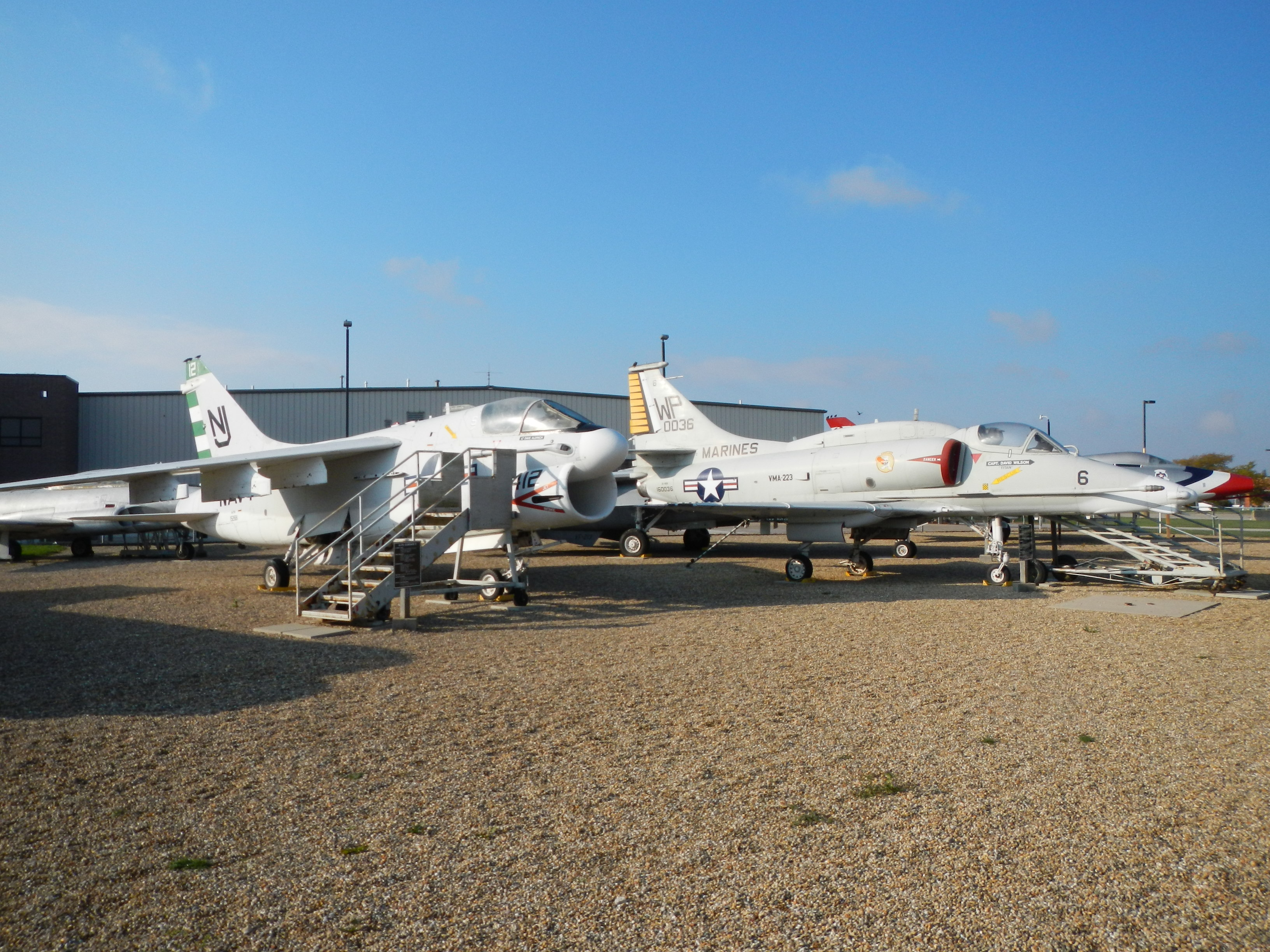
An A-7 and A-4 on display at the museum

- Bell AH-1J SeaCobra 157771
- Bell UH-1H Iroquois 67-17832
- Cessna 310
- Grumman F-14D Tomcat 161163
- Lockheed T-33 35979
- LTV A-7A Corsair II 152681
- McDonnell Douglas A-4M Skyhawk 160036
- McDonnell Douglas F-4N Phantom II 150444
- North American F-100 Super Sabre
- Northrop T-38A Talon 60-0549

== See also ==
- List of aviation museums
