= Central Illinois Regional Airport =

Commercial airport near Bloomington, Illinois, USA

Central Illinois Regional Airport at Bloomington–Normal

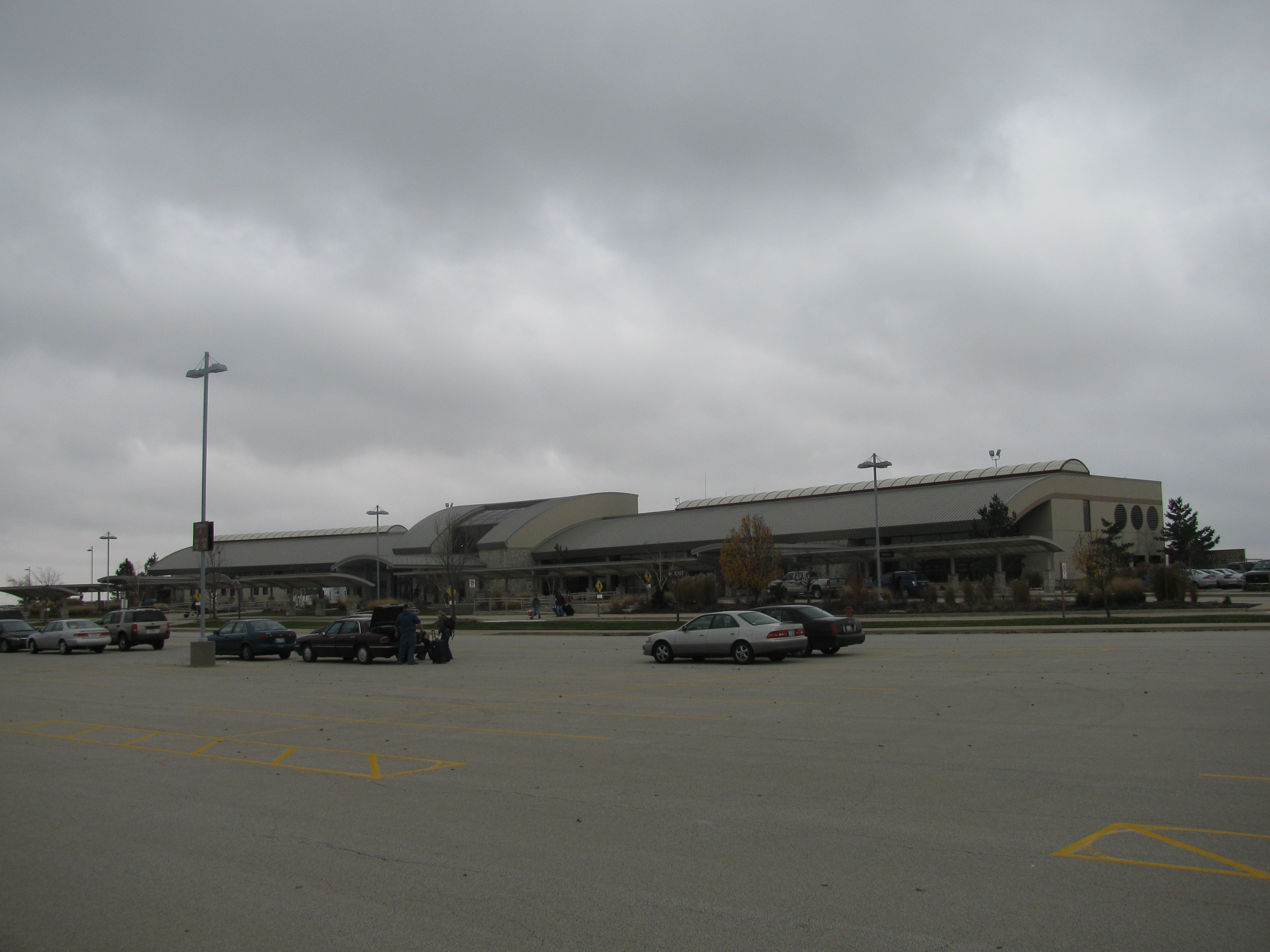
- Landside view of terminal
- IATA: BMI; ICAO: KBMI; FAA LID: BMI

Summary
- Airport type: Public
- Owner: Bloomington–Normal Airport Authority
- Serves: Bloomington / Normal, Illinois
- Elevation AMSL: 871 ft (265 m)
- Coordinates: 40°28′38″N 088°54′57″W
- Website: www.CIRA.com

Maps
- FAA airport diagram
- Interactive map of Central Illinois Regional Airport at Bloomington–Normal

Runways
Direction	Length		Surface
Direction	ft	m	Surface
2/20	8,000	2,438	Concrete
11/29	6,525	1,989	Asphalt/concrete

Statistics (2021)
- Aircraft operations: 23,199
- Based aircraft: 74
- Source: Federal Aviation Administration

Central Illinois Regional Airport at Bloomington–Normal (IATA: BMI, ICAO: KBMI, FAA LID: BMI) is a public airport in McLean County, Illinois, three miles east of Bloomington and southeast of Normal. Owned by the Bloomington–Normal Airport Authority, it is also known as Central Illinois Regional Airport (CIRA).

The National Plan of Integrated Airport Systems for 2023–2027 categorized it as a primary commercial service airport. Federal Aviation Administration records say the airport had 262,846 passenger boardings (enplanements) in calendar year 2008, 243,448 in 2009 and 274,677 in 2010. In 2023, Central Illinois Regional Airport saw 164,672 passenger boardings ranking the airport as the 198th busiest airport in the United States.

The 2013 Federal sequester would have resulted in the closure of the airport's control tower, but the Federal Aviation Administration ultimately reversed its decision.

== First airfield in Normal ==
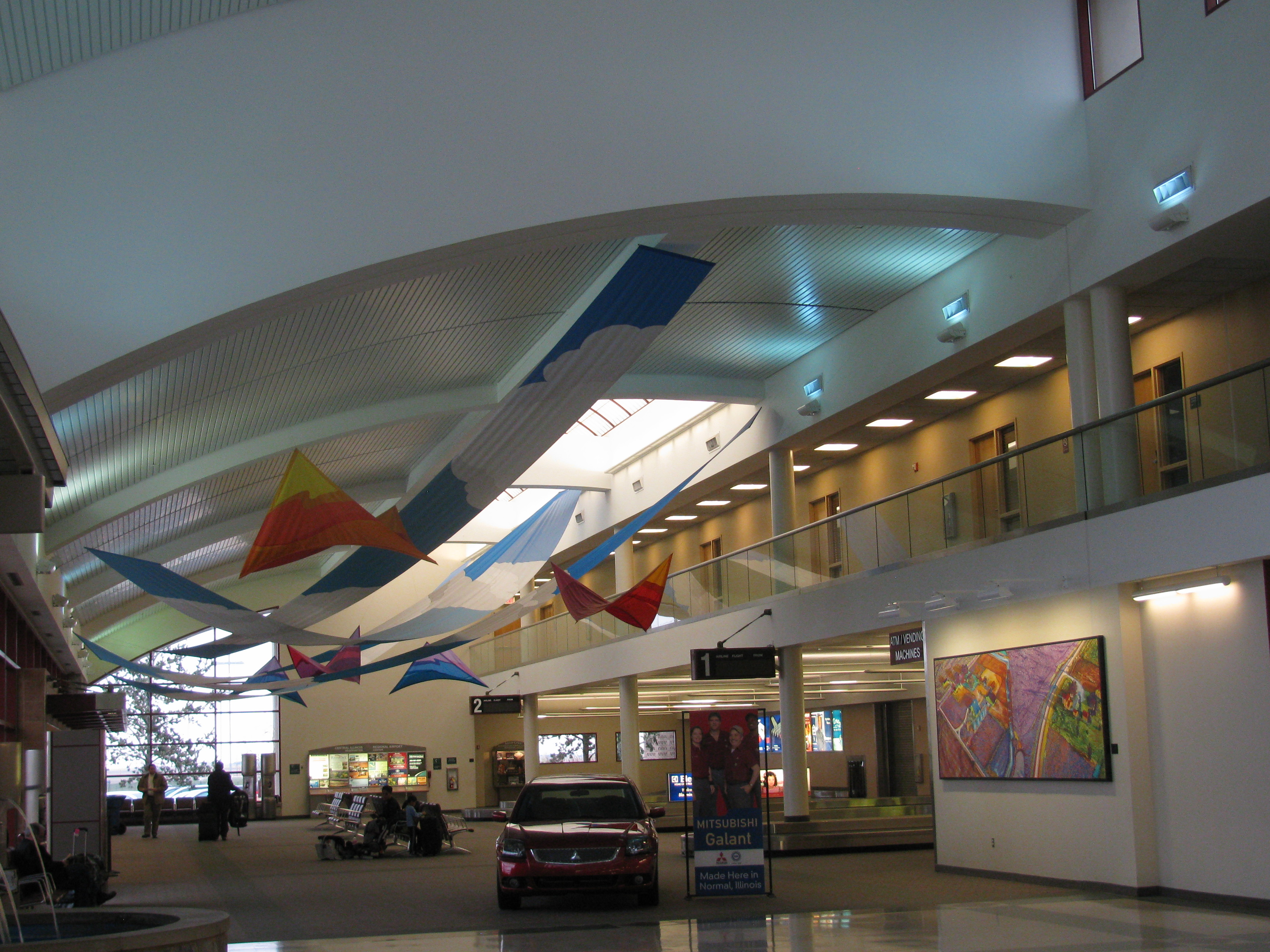
Terminal interior

The origins of an airport in the Bloomington-Normal community dates back to 1927, when farmer Herman Will opened a 70-plus-acre tract in rural Normal Township. Bordering the field to the west was the recently paved Illinois 2 (today U.S. 51/Main Street), and to the east was the Illinois Central Railroad (today Constitution Trail) and where the Kerrick grain elevator once stood. The Bloomington Flying Club helped rally the general public and local leaders behind the economic promise of "heavier-than-air" flight. The club owned a "Jenny"-type open-cockpit biplane, and the non-profit organization evidently helped pay for both the construction of a hangar and day-to-day operations of the field. Will offered to rent the field to the city of Bloomington for $1,000 a year, but there was little enthusiasm for a municipally owned or operated airport. In 1928, the Normal field featured a six-plane hangar, fueling pump, wind cone, a circle of crushed stone 100-feet in diameter (the purpose of which was to identify the field from the air), and 75 acres of "comparatively level ground".

The airfield dedication was held on May 30, 1928, and witnessed by some 10,000 area residents. Local and visiting pilots staged an air show of "stunts and jumps and aerial tricks", according to The Pantagraph. There was "premier" stunt pilot Steve Lacey, representing the Air King factory in Lomax, Illinois, and Bloomington-raised escape artist Nathan B. Winslow, who thrilled spectators by freeing himself from a straight jacket during flight. A few weeks after the dedication, the U.S. Department of Commerce placed the Normal field on its list of officially recognized airports. The following summer, on July 11, 1929, a larger crowd (est 10,000) gathered at the airfield for the Central Illinois Air Derby which was billed at the time as the greatest such event in Illinois outside of Chicago.

In 1931, Century Air Lines added Bloomington to its Chicago-to-St. Louis route. Unfortunately the wet winter of 1931-1932 made the field too mushy for the carrier's Stinson tri-motor airplanes. The following spring, American Airways assumed Century's role, but after only two days (May 1–2) the company terminated service. Nothing survives of the old Normal airfield, but a historic marker near the north end of Constitution Trail commemorates the site. The marker is on the trail's west side near a Rivian Automotive warehouse.

== The Bloomington Central Illinois Regional Airport ==
Opposition to a municipally operated airfield weakened with the promise of federal dollars through the Civil Works Administration, one of President Franklin D. Roosevelt's many "alphabet" New Deal programs. In mid-December 1933, during the height of the Great Depression, local officials settled on a 164-acre site east of Bloomington along Illinois 9 where the site of a new permanent airfield would be situated. Originally known as the Bloomington Municipal Airport, it was founded in 1946 by local businessman and aviation enthusiast Charles G. Shafer. The airport was initially supported by the city of Bloomington with a $50,000 bond issue. The airport was primarily used for general aviation and served as a hub for flights to and from other cities in the Midwest.

A permanent passenger terminal was built in 1964. The original terminal building included Arnie's Restaurant & Lounge, a popular place for brunch and dinner and an attraction to fly-in general aviation visitors. Commercial service at the airport from the original terminal building (1964 to 2001) included: Britt Airways to/from Peoria IL, Mattoon IL, Champaign IL, Chicago O'Hare; Ozark Airways to Decatur IL, Mattoon, Chicago O'Hare; Air Midwest to St. Louis MO, Decatur; Midwest Express to Milwaukee WI; Northwest Airlink to Detroit MI; Continental Express to Chicago O'Hare; Midway Connection to Chicago Midway; Trans World Express to St.Louis; American Eagle Airlines to Chicago O'Hare; United Express to Chicago O'Hare, and Frontier Airlines to Denver.

== The Central Illinois Regional Airport ==
As the pace of growth of Bloomington-Normal continued the new present-day terminal was opened in 2001. Service at the present day terminal has seen AirTran Airlines to Atlanta; Northwest Airlink to Detroit and Minneapolis; United Express to Chicago O'Hare; Frontier to Denver and Orlando; Allegiant Airlines to Sanford FL, Tampa FL, and Phoenix; Delta Air Lines with service to Detroit and Atlanta.

== Facilities and aircraft ==
The airport covers 1,968 acres (796 ha) at an elevation of 871 feet (265 m). It has two runways: runway 2/20 is 8,000 by 150 feet (2,438 x 46 m) concrete and runway 11/29 is 6,525 by 150 feet (1,989 x 46 m) asphalt/concrete.

On November 5, 2001, the airport opened a new $14 million terminal building, three times larger than the previous terminal. The new terminal has four ground level boarding gates (Gates 1–4) and five second level gates (Gates 5–9). Gates 3, 4, 5, 6, 8, and 9 have jetways. Gates 1, 2 and 7 are jetway capable but are not currently equipped. The terminal has two baggage carousels at ground level. Conference rooms and a VIP lounge cater to business travelers. Free wireless Internet access is available throughout the building.

CIRA has a healthy general aviation presence. The fixed-base operator on the field, Synergy Flight Center, offers standard FBO services, as well as private and advanced flight training, aircraft maintenance, sales, management and charter. Hangar rental, fueling, and aircraft maintenance facilities are available.

The Prairie Aviation Museum is on the west side of the airport. It is open to the public on Tuesday evenings and all day on Saturdays and Sundays. It exhibits more modern ex-USAF and US Navy aircraft.

For the 12-month period ending December 31, 2021, the airport had 23,199 aircraft movements, an average of 64 per day. It included 73% general aviation, 18% commercial, 8% air taxi, and 2% commercial. For the same time period, there are 74 aircraft based on the field: 58 single-engine and 4 multi-engine airplanes, 11 jets, and 1 helicopter.

== Airlines and destinations ==
=== Passenger ===
Airlines	Destinations	Refs
Allegiant Air	Orlando/Sanford, Phoenix/Mesa, St. Petersburg/Clearwater	
American Eagle	Chicago–O'Hare, Dallas/Fort Worth	
Delta Connection	Atlanta	

Destinations map
Destinations from Central Illinois Regional Airport
Red = Year-round destination
Green = Seasonal destination
Blue = Future destination

=== Cargo ===
Airlines	Destinations
FedEx Express	Memphis

=== Top destinations ===
Busiest domestic routes from BMI (March 2025 – February 2026)
Rank	City	Passengers	Airline
1	Atlanta, Georgia	44,700	Delta
2	Dallas/Fort Worth, Texas	43,190	American
3	Chicago–O'Hare, Illinois	32,350	American
4	Orlando (Sanford), Florida	19,490	Allegiant
5	St. Petersburg/Clearwater, Florida	17,400	Allegiant

== Ground transportation ==
Public transit service to the airport is provided by Connect Transit. The Tan Line runs from the airport to Uptown Normal.

== Accidents and incidents ==
- On March 21, 2004, a private flight from Darlington, South Carolina did not arrive and instead impacted in mountains in Kentucky. A search was initiated when the flight did not land at its destination nor the pilot's home airport, Central Regional Illinois Airport. The wreckage was located near the peak of Little Black Mountain.
- On November 9, 2005, a Piper PA-23 was substantially damaged during a nighttime visual approach to runway 29. The aircraft had departed from Greater Peoria Regional Airport and was attempting to return due to a rough-running right engine, but he diverted to Bloomington instead. The pilot received fatal injuries. The probable cause was found to be pilot impairment due to diabetes.
- On July 3, 2009, a Cessna 150 crashed while attempting a forced landing at the airport. The engine suddenly quit while the aircraft was on approach to make a forced landing. The pilot reported the plane stalled while approaching a road, and while he attempted to lower the nose and dump flaps, the left wing impacted a tree and the aircraft impacted the ground.
- On August 30, 2010, a Diamond Aircraft DA20 sustained substantial damage during landing in Bloomington. The pilot reported he stalled the plane 10 feet above the ground, and the aircraft's right wing tip contacted the ground. The airplane exited the runway and the left wingtip impacted the ground. The pilot added power to go around and landed successfully on the second attempt. The probable cause was found to be the pilot's failure to maintain adequate airspeed during landing, which resulted in a stall.
- On April 7, 2015, a Cessna 414A, registration number N789UP, substantially wandered from the correct flight path during an instrument approach to Runway 20 in low visibility and struck terrain in a nose-down attitude, killing the pilot and all six passengers. Investigators found that the glideslope antenna cable had not been securely connected, which rendered some of the avionics useless, increasing the workload for the pilot. Investigators also concluded that the pilot had been awake for 18 consecutive hours before the accident and that the aircraft was loaded with the center of gravity too far aft, rendering it difficult to control. The accident was attributed to "the pilot's failure to maintain control of the airplane during the instrument approach in night instrument meteorological conditions, which resulted in the airplane exceeding its critical angle of attack and an aerodynamic stall/spin. Contributing to the accident were pilot fatigue, the pilot's increased workload during the instrument approach resulting from the lack of glideslope guidance due to an inadequately connected/secured glideslope antenna cable, and the airplane being loaded aft of its balance limit."

== See also ==
- List of airports in Illinois
- Uptown Station
