= Frontier Airlines =

American ultra-low-cost airline

Frontier Airlines, Inc.

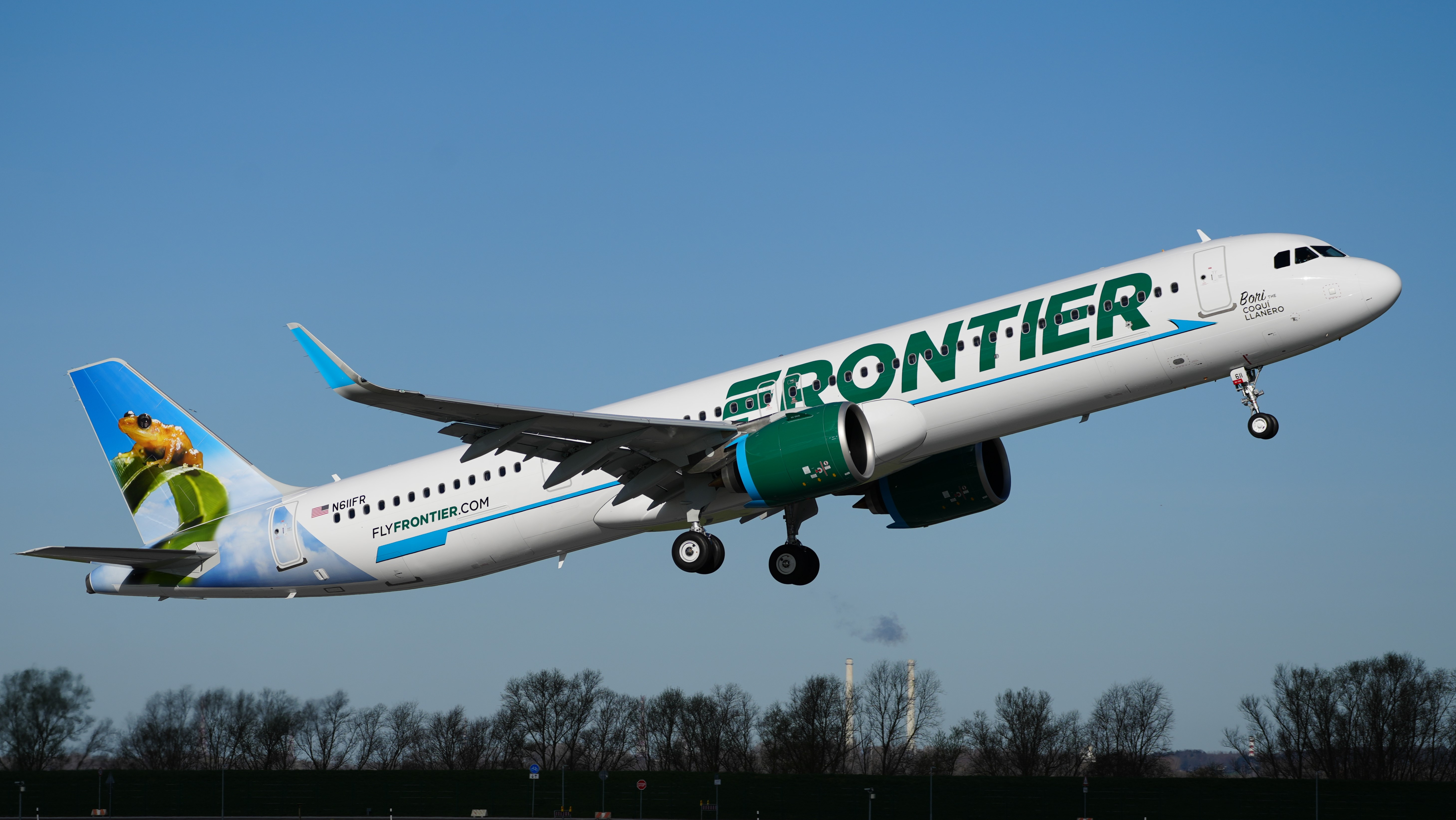
- Frontier Airlines Airbus A321neo
IATA	ICAO	Call sign
F9	FFT	FRONTIER FLIGHT
- Founded: February 8, 1994; 32 years ago
- Commenced operations: July 5, 1994; 32 years ago
- AOC #: F3LA008Y
- Operating bases: Atlanta; Chicago–Midway; Chicago–O'Hare; Cincinnati; Cleveland; Dallas/Fort Worth; Denver; Las Vegas; Miami; Orlando; Philadelphia; Phoenix–Sky Harbor; San Juan; Tampa; Trenton
- Frequent-flyer program: Frontier Miles
- Fleet size: 174
- Destinations: 123
- Parent company: Indigo Partners (78%)
- Traded as: Nasdaq: ULCC
- Headquarters: Denver, Colorado, U.S.
- Key people: James G. Dempsey (CEO); Bill Franke (chair)
- Founders: Frederick W. "Rick" Brown; Janice Brown; Bob Schulman
- Revenue: ▼US$3.724 billion (2025)
- Operating income: ▲US$(149) million (2025)
- Net income: ▲US$(137) million (2025)
- Total assets: ▼US$958 million (2025)
- Total equity: ▼US$491 million (2025)
- Employees: ▼7,656 (2025)
- Website: flyfrontier.com

Notes
- Financials as of December 31, 2025. References

Frontier Airlines, Inc., is an American ultra-low-cost airline headquartered in Denver, Colorado. It operates flights to over 120 destinations in the United States, the Caribbean, Mexico and Central America, and employs more than 5,000 staff. The carrier is a publicly traded company and maintains operating bases in 13 cities across the contiguous United States and Puerto Rico.

== History ==
=== 1990s ===
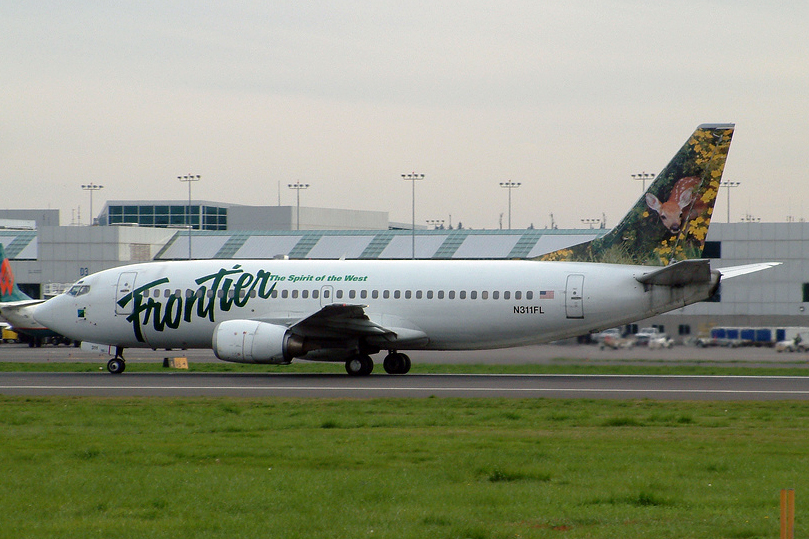
Frontier Boeing 737-300 in the original 1994 livery. Frontier retired its last 737 in 2005.

Frontier Airlines was created by Frederick W. "Rick" Brown (a United Airlines pilot), his wife Janice Brown, and Bob Schulman, the latter two having worked at the original Frontier Airlines that operated between 1950 and 1986. In 1993, Continental Airlines was scaling back flights from Denver's Stapleton International Airport (which was closed and replaced with Denver International Airport in 1995), and the three proposed a charter airline named AeroDenver Travel Services to fill demand on international routes, potentially in partnership with Condor Airlines. To run the company, they brought in M. C. "Hank" Lund (ex-CEO of the original Frontier Airlines) as CEO and Sam Addoms as executive vice-president and treasurer (later CEO).

As Continental's Denver drawback expanded in scope in late 1993, the proposed airline pivoted to fill regional routes, and adopted the Frontier Airlines name. The company was incorporated in February and went public in May 1994. Scheduled flights began on July 5, 1994, using Boeing 737-200 jetliners between Denver and four cities in North Dakota. Around three-quarters of its 180 employees, and many executives, had worked for the original Frontier Airlines. By January 1995, Frontier had expanded its route network from Denver and was serving destinations in New Mexico, Montana, North Dakota, Texas, Nevada, Nebraska, and Arizona. Like the original airline of the same name, the new Frontier operated a hub at Denver (DEN) and for the first nine years used the slogan "The Spirit of the West" which was displayed above the windows and just behind the cursive letters "Frontier" on the fuselage of their aircraft.

In 1999, Frontier signed agreements to begin purchasing and leasing Airbus A318 and A319 jet aircraft and had also added Boeing 737-300 jetliners to its fleet as well. Also by September 1999, the airline was serving destinations from coast to coast in the U.S., having expanded its route network to include Atlanta (ATL); Baltimore (BWI); Bloomington/Normal, Illinois (BMI); Boston (BOS); Chicago (MDW, Midway Airport); Dallas/Fort Worth (DFW); Phoenix (PHX); Los Angeles (LAX); Minneapolis/St. Paul (MSP); New York City (LGA, LaGuardia Airport); Orlando (MCO); Portland, Oregon (PDX); Salt Lake City (SLC); San Diego (SAN); San Francisco (SFO); and Seattle (SEA), all served from its Denver hub.

=== 2000s ===
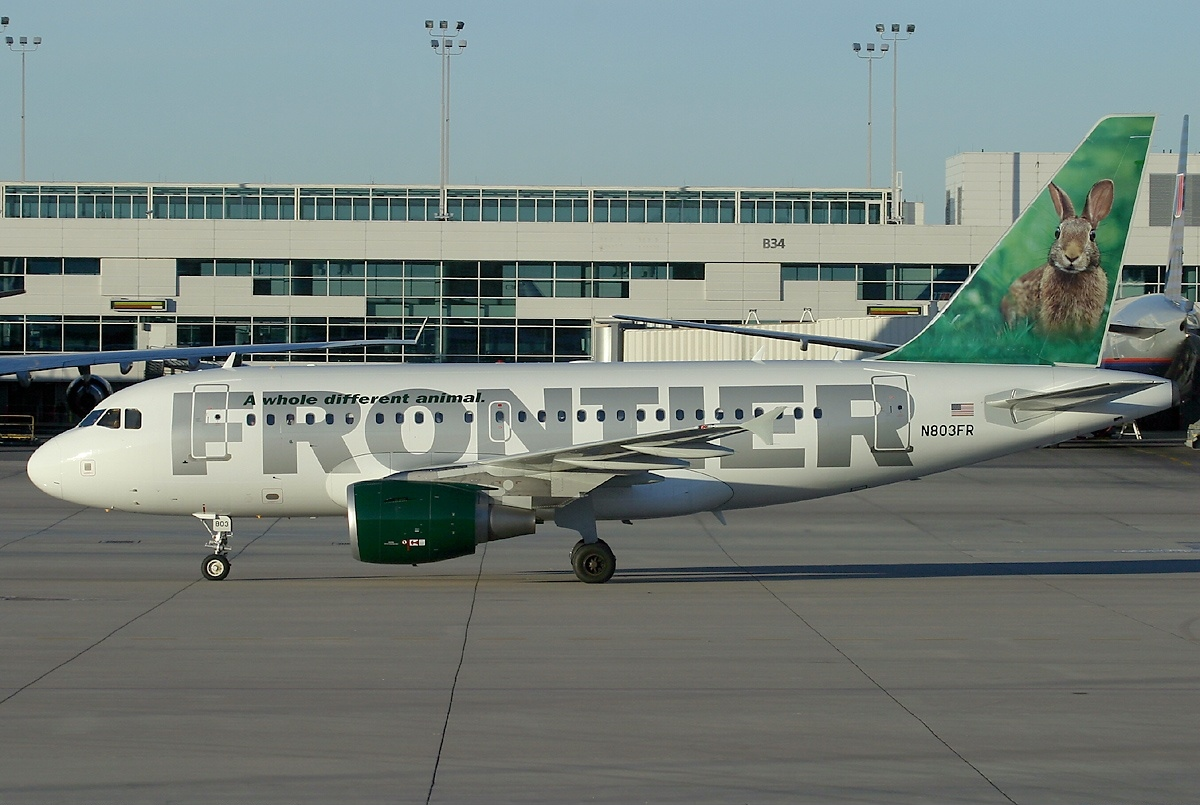
Frontier Airbus A318 in the livery introduced in 2001. Frontier was the first operator of the A318.

Frontier took delivery of its first Airbus aircraft (an A319) in 2001 and simultaneously launched with it DirecTV in-flight television along with a new company livery. Frontier Airlines was the launch customer of the Airbus A318 in 2003. In mid-April 2005, Frontier officially became an all-Airbus fleet, retiring its last Boeing 737. Jeff Potter was appointed CEO in 2002. Sean Menke, formerly Senior Marketing VP with Air Canada, succeeded Potter as CEO of Frontier Airlines in 2007, and guided the company through bankruptcy reorganization.

As part of its plan to stay competitive in reaction to the entry of Southwest Airlines into Denver, the company underwent a reorganization early in 2006. On April 3, 2006, Frontier created Frontier Airlines Holdings (FRNT), a holding company incorporated in Delaware to take advantage of favorable tax laws in that state. The corporate headquarters did not leave Colorado. In 2007, Frontier established a commuter airline subsidiary, Lynx Aviation, Inc., chaired by Dr. Paul Stephen Dempsey. Dr. Dempsey was Vice-Chairman of Frontier Airlines for 15 years. He left the University of Denver in 2002 to become Tomlinson Professor of Law, and Director of the Institute of Air & Space Law at McGill University.

On January 24, 2007, Frontier was designated as a major carrier by the United States Department of Transportation.

On January 11, 2007, Frontier Airlines signed an 11-year service agreement with Republic Airways. Under the agreement, Republic was to operate 17 76-seat Embraer 170 aircraft for the former Frontier JetExpress operations. At the time the contract was canceled in April 2008, Republic Airways operated 11 aircraft for Frontier Airlines, with the remaining six aircraft expected to join the fleet by December 2008. With the integration of Republic aircraft, the 'JetExpress' denotation was removed. Subsequent to the cessation of Horizon's services for Frontier in December 2007, all flights operated by Republic were sold and marketed as "Frontier Airlines, operated by Republic Airways." The first market created specifically for the Embraer 170 was Louisville, Kentucky, which began on April 1, 2007. Service to Louisville was suspended in August 2008 but restarted in April 2010.

Flights operated by Republic Airlines offered in-flight snack and beverage services similar to Frontier's mainline flights. Unlike Frontier's aircraft and due to the nature of contracting with regional carriers, these Embraer 170 aircraft were not fitted with LiveTV.

On April 10, 2008, Frontier filed for Chapter 11 bankruptcy in reaction to the intent of its credit card processor, First Data, to withhold significant proceeds from ticket sales. First Data decided that it would withhold 100% of the carrier's proceeds from ticket sales beginning May 1. According to Frontier's press release, "This change in practice would have represented a material change to our cash forecasts and business plan. Unchecked, it would have put severe restraints on Frontier's liquidity..." Its operation continued uninterrupted, though, as Chapter 11 bankruptcy protected the corporation's assets and allowed restructuring to ensure long-term viability. After months of losses, Frontier Airlines reported that they made their first profit during the month of November 2008, reporting US$2.9 million in net income for the month.

On June 22, 2009, Frontier Airlines announced that, pending bankruptcy court approval, Republic Airways Holdings, the Indianapolis-based parent company of Republic Airways, would acquire all assets of Frontier for the amount of $108 million. Thus, Frontier Airlines would become a wholly owned subsidiary of Republic. However, five weeks later on July 30, Dallas-based Southwest Airlines announced that it would be making a competing bid of $113.6 million for Frontier with intentions to also operate Frontier as a wholly owned subsidiary, but that it would gradually fold Frontier resources into current Southwest operating assets.

During a bankruptcy auction on August 13, 2009, Republic Airways Holdings acquired Frontier Airlines and its regional airline, Lynx Aviation, as wholly owned subsidiaries. On October 1, Republic completed the transaction, and Frontier officially exited bankruptcy as a new airline.

In late 2009, Republic began to consolidate administrative positions and moved 140 jobs from the Frontier Airlines Denver headquarters to Indianapolis. Shortly after in January 2010, Republic Airways announced that it would move all of its executives to Indianapolis. Later in February, the Denver Business Journal stated that the headquarters would be moved "soon". Despite this, according to the Denver Business Journal, Frontier Airlines will still maintain a local headquarters in Denver to house Training, Marketing, Customer Reservations, and Scheduling & Planning teams after extending its lease on the building through 2020.

In 2010, Frontier's then-CEO Bryan Bedford took part in the reality TV show Undercover Boss.

As Republic Airways Holdings was in the process of bidding to acquire Frontier in 2009, it was also in the process of acquiring Milwaukee-based Midwest Airlines. Through the fall and winter of 2009, Republic operated its two new acquisitions as separate brands. However, to improve efficiency by better matching aircraft capacity to route demand, Republic began to intermix the fleets of the two airlines, swapping a portion of its higher-capacity planes from Frontier with its smaller-capacity planes from Midwest and vice versa. However, the move caused some confusion amongst the public, as the two brands did not offer the same amenities and did not match the amenities mentioned on the airfare. As a result, in the spring of 2010, Frontier and Midwest Airlines announced that their brands would merge, with Frontier being the surviving brand. This was a merger of brands only—no Midwest Airlines aircraft was ever operated by Frontier, as by this time, all Midwest Airlines flights were operated on its behalf by other Republic Airways Holdings subsidiaries.

On April 13, 2011, Frontier formed a new subsidiary, Frontier Express, that was planned to operate the airline's smaller aircraft with different services than those available on full-size aircraft.

=== 2010s ===
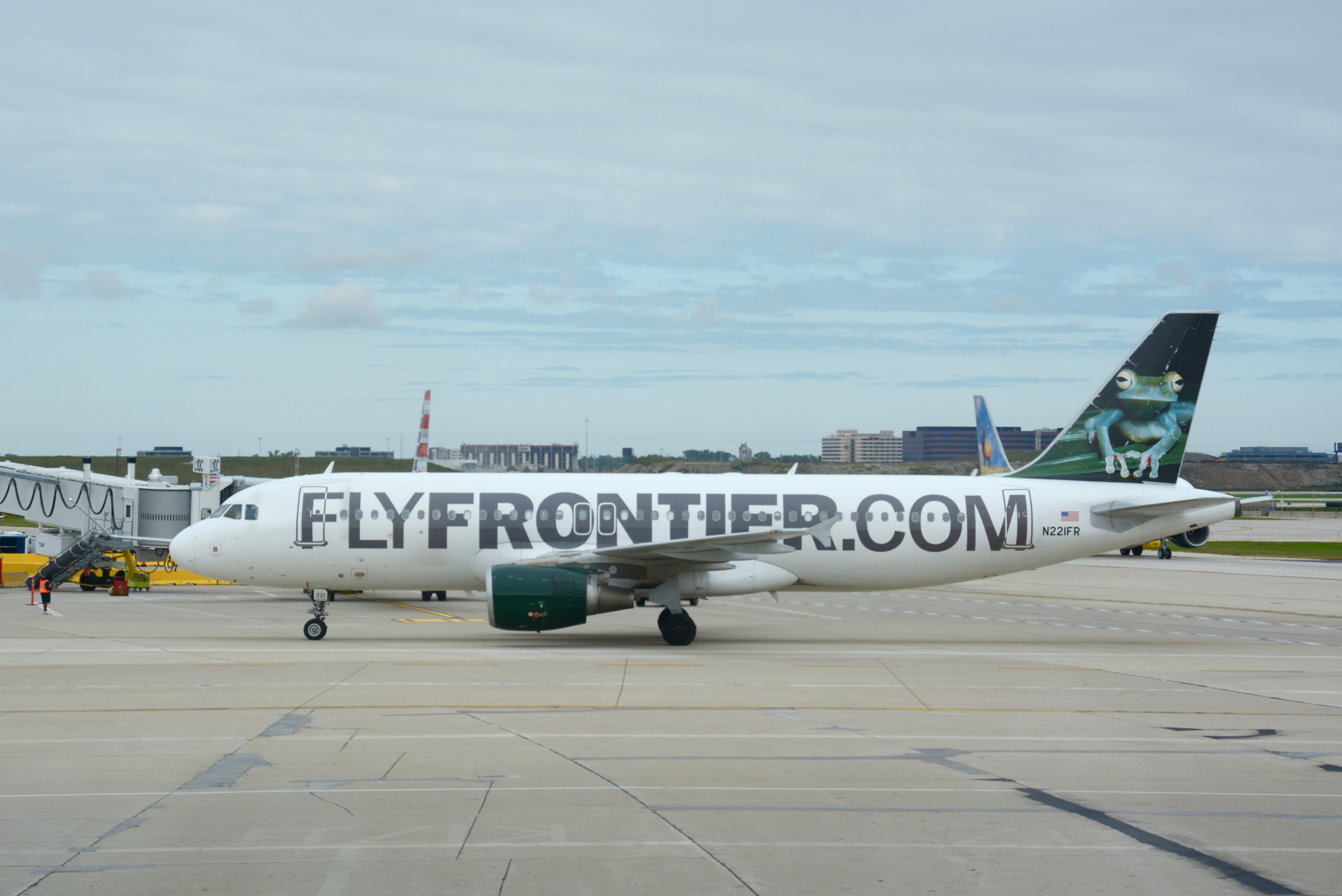
Frontier Airbus A320-200 in the 2013 livery

Upon the full merger and integration of Frontier and Midwest Airlines in October 2010, Frontier and its regional partners operated over 100 daily flights from the Milwaukee hub. However, on September 9, 2011, Frontier notified the public of a 40% reduction of arriving and departing flights from MKE. Along with this reduction of flights, the company laid off approximately 140 employees from the MKE station. This included but was not limited to: maintenance, grooming services, flight-line and gate.

In February 2012, Frontier Airlines further reduced service to Milwaukee by cutting five more nonstop routes. This move "reduced Frontier's daily departing flights out of Mitchell International from 32 to 18," or 56%. Frontier announced further layoffs in conjunction with this route change: up to 446 Milwaukee-area employees were affected by the job cuts that occurred between April 15 and 30, 2012.

In an effort to focus on regional contract flights for major carriers, Republic Airways Holdings announced in January 2012 its intention to sell or spin off Frontier. On January 26, 2012, Republic Airways Holdings appointed former US Airways and Gate Gourmet CEO David Siegel as president and CEO of Frontier Airlines. Republic also added new senior officers for Frontier's finance and commercial team, among other changes in the executive leadership team. Siegel and other Frontier executives moved to Denver where Frontier is headquartered in order to facilitate management of all aspects of Frontier during its separation process from Republic and continue its transformation into an ultra low-cost carrier (ULCC).

In November 2012, Frontier started low-frequency service between Orlando International Airport and Trenton–Mercer Airport (TTN), located in Ewing, New Jersey, which at that time, had no commercial service. Frontier later expanded service several times from Trenton, and as of January 2023, it served nine destinations. Frontier currently bases three aircraft in Trenton. Trenton Mercer Airport lies roughly equidistant between Philadelphia International Airport and Newark Liberty International Airport.

In July 2013, Frontier started service from Wilmington-New Castle Airport (ILG) near Wilmington, Delaware, to five destinations, which Frontier markets as Wilmington/Philadelphia. Again, this airport had no commercial service prior to Frontier's entry. New Castle Airport lies roughly 30 miles southwest of Philadelphia International Airport and 75 miles northeast of Baltimore–Washington International Airport. As of 2022, Frontier does not serve ILG.

Frontier marketed both the Trenton-Mercer and Wilmington-Philadelphia airports as low-cost, low-hassle alternatives to the existing nearby commercial airports. Frontier is the only commercial carrier at Trenton, and was the only carrier at ILG until it left in 2022.

In October 2013, Republic Airways Holdings entered into an agreement with private equity firm Indigo Partners to sell Frontier Airlines for approximately $145 million. According to Indigo, the transaction would further Frontier's evolution into an ULCC. In December 2013, Indigo Partners LLC, through an affiliate, completed the purchase of Frontier Airlines from Republic Airways Holdings. The airline's headquarters remained in Denver. On January 1, 2014, Republic Airways Holdings subsidiary Republic Airlines ceased its operation of Embraer 190 aircraft on behalf of Frontier.

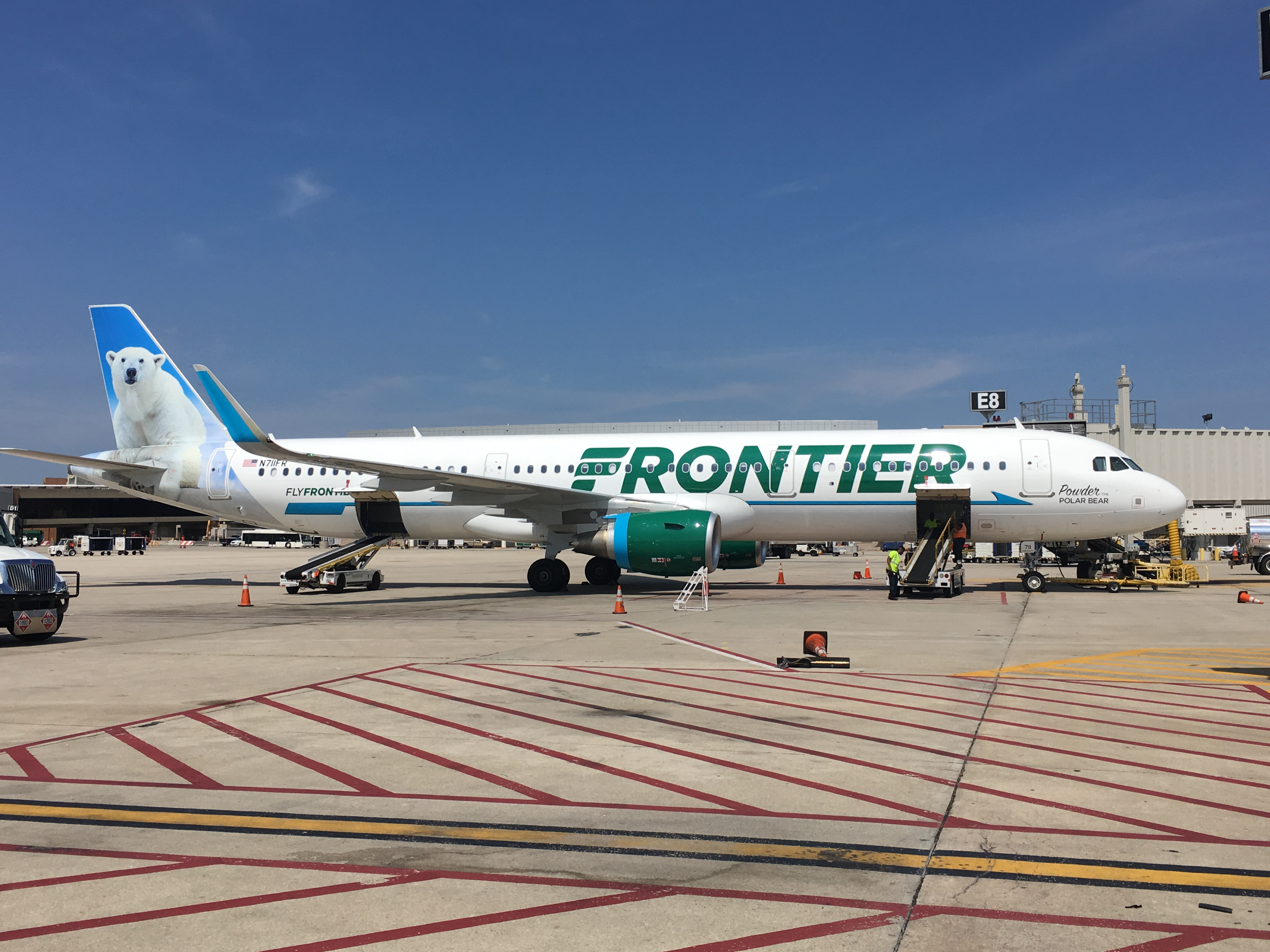
Frontier Airbus A321-200 in the 2014 livery

In 2014, Frontier announced it would be transitioning into an ULCC. Frontier also announced that it would cut several flights and jobs at its Denver hub and transition them to different markets. On January 16, 2015, Frontier announced that it would close both its Denver and Milwaukee call centers, laying off 1,300 employees and outsourcing the jobs to call center company Sitel, which operates a large call center for Frontier in Las Cruces, New Mexico. Frontier Airlines joined Spirit and Allegiant in June 2015 by eradicating its toll-free telephone number for customer service.

In June 2014, Frontier Airlines opened a crew base for flight attendants at Trenton–Mercer Airport.

In January 2015, Frontier Airlines cut several flights from Wilmington and Trenton. It also resumed service to Philadelphia, casting doubt on the airline's existing bases. In late June 2015, Frontier announced it had ceased service in Wilmington, stating it was not profitable.

In February 2015, Frontier announced that they would begin service to several destinations from Atlanta, adding the airport as a focus city. In July, Frontier began to decrease service from Washington Dulles International Airport, removing the airport as a focus city. In early 2016, Frontier announced major route expansion from airports nationwide, including Atlanta, Chicago, Cincinnati, Cleveland, Orlando, and Philadelphia. In June 2016, Frontier re-established service to John Glenn Columbus International Airport. In May 2017, the airline announced it would open a new crew base in Las Vegas in fall 2017, to improve operational reliability and potentially create new jobs in Las Vegas. In December 2017, Frontier began service to Buffalo, New York, with service to Denver, Colorado, and Florida, including Miami, Fort Myers, Orlando, and Tampa.

In May 2015, Indigo and Frontier announced the departure of David Siegel as CEO. He had already previously turned over the role of president to Barry Biffle, formerly of Spirit Airlines. Siegel was not immediately replaced; instead, his duties were split between Biffle and Indigo chairman Bill Franke. Biffle cited operational issues in connection with Siegel's departure.

In 2015, in an airline quality rating report by Embry-Riddle Aeronautical University and Wichita State University, Frontier was ranked amongst the five worst airlines in the United States, especially due to its rate of customer complaints and bumped passengers. The airline had relatively poor on-time performance, and the waiting time for help when calling the airline on the phone was reported to have risen to two hours or more.

In December 2016, a winter weather event disrupted fleet operations and caused Frontier to delay or cancel up to 70% of their flights suddenly during the peak of the crisis. On the weekend of December 17, the storm caused major delays at Frontier's Denver hub. The effects of the storm were felt throughout the fleet. Flights were delayed or canceled at airports across the country; in some cases, planes were ready to depart, but the airline had no rested and available flight crews to service the flights. The head of Frontier's pilot's union issued a statement criticizing the companies' handling of the event, comparing the airline to a "house of cards."

=== 2020s ===
In 2020, class-action lawsuits against Frontier were filed after the company refused to refund airfare for customers who could not travel during the COVID-19 pandemic. The company accepted part of the $25 billion in U.S. government funds to offset financial damage to the airline industry during the outbreak.

On April 1, 2021, Frontier went public with an initial public offering on the Nasdaq exchange. The company adopted the ticker symbol ULCC, a nod to the company's ultra low-cost carrier business model.

In early 2022, Frontier attempted to acquire Spirit Airlines, another US-based ULCC in a US$2.8 billion cash-and-stock deal. The deal would have created the fifth-largest airline in the country. After announcing the proposal, JetBlue made a competing offer to acquire Spirit for US$3.6 billion in cash. On July 27, 2022, Spirit announced that its shareholders had rejected Frontier's offer.

In November 2022, Frontier announced that it would establish a crew operating base at Dallas Fort Worth International Airport (DFW) in early 2023, and would add a gate in DFW Terminal E for flights to additional destinations starting in April of that year. That month, it also eliminated its customer service phone line completely, referring customers to online channels.

In 2023, a series of class-action lawsuits in multiple states were filed against Frontier alleging that passengers with bags which met the airline's advertised personal item size were systematically forced to check their bags at the gate, incurring a $100 fee. The class action was preceded by an influx of videos on the social media platform TikTok criticizing Frontier's baggage policy, with a focus on Frontier's practice of paying agents a commission if they can get passengers to pay for oversized baggage at the gate prior to boarding. The criticism led Frontier to admit that policies were not being "consistently applied" by its gate agents, as well as that the airline pays its agents a commission bonus for every passenger that is charged with an additional baggage fee at the gate.

In February 2024, another video about Frontier's baggage policy went viral on TikTok. In the short video, a frustrated passenger alleges that Frontier covertly makes their baggage sizers smaller than the advertised dimensions in order to up-charge customers for baggage; to prove this, she demonstrates how her personal item comfortably fits within the sizer of competitor airlines like Spirit Airlines but cannot fit into Frontier's sizer, despite the two airlines having the same listed dimension allowance.

On December 4, 2024, the Senior Vice-President and Chief Commercial Officer of Frontier, Robert Schroeter, testified before the Senate Permanent Subcommittee on Investigations at a hearing on predatory "junk" fees charged by airlines for baggage. Senators from both parties, including Senators Josh Hawley and Richard Blumenthal, harshly criticized Frontier's incentives program for its gate agents, pointing out that it had resulted in upwards of $26 million being paid out in baggage fee commissions by 2023.

In 2025, Frontier, known for having the lowest cost per mile in North America at $0.0985, ranked fifth in the 2025 edition of Skytrax's annual "Best Low-Cost Airlines in North America" ranking.

On July 14, 2026, Frontier announced it would install Starlink Wi-Fi services in-flight starting in 2027, after both American/United had installed those services earlier that same year (2026), making that the first such wireless connection offered by Frontier.

== Corporate affairs ==
=== Business trends ===
The key trends for Frontier Group Holdings, Inc. are (as at the financial year ending December 31):

Year	Revenue (in million US$)	Net income (in million US$)	Employees (FTE)	Passengers (in millions)	Load factor (%)	Aircraft	Refs
2010	1,317			9.3	83.6		
2011	1,662			10.6	87.1		
2012	1,433	17		10.3	88.8	55	
2013	1,349	11	3,614	10.2	90.6	52	
2014	1,575	140	3,653	11.7	90.4	54	
2015	1,604	146	2,981	12.6	88.0	61	
2016	1,714	200	3,163	14.8	87.2	66	
2017	1,915	162	3,584	16.8	86.4	78	
2018	2,156	80	3,978	19.4	84.9	84	
2019	2,508	251	4,935	22.7	86.1	98	
2020	1,250	(225)	4,974	11.2	67.5	104	(Note: 2020: Activities and income in fiscal 2020 were severely reduced by the impact of the coronavirus pandemic)
2021	2,060	(102)	5,481	20.7	75.9	110	
2022	3,326	(37)	6,450	25.5	80.9	120	
2023	3,589	(11)	7,214	30.2	81.4	136	
2024	3,775	85	7,938	33.3	76.8	159	
2025	3,724	(137)	7,656	33.2	78.4	176	

At the end of 2025, the airline employed approximately 2,300 pilots, 3,700 flight attendants, 500 aircraft technicians, and 150 employees working as aircraft appearance agents, flight dispatchers, material specialists, and maintenance controllers. The airline also employed 1,100 administrative staff.

=== Management changes ===
Dave Siegel took the chief executive officer role in January 2012. Siegel's tenure ran through May 2015, when he left for personal reasons and was succeeded by the company's chairman, Bill Franke, who would manage strategy and finances. In April 2014, Barry L. Biffle was appointed as the company's president, reporting to Siegel; after Siegel's departure, Biffle was charged with managing the company's day-to-day operations.

=== Former regional carriers ===
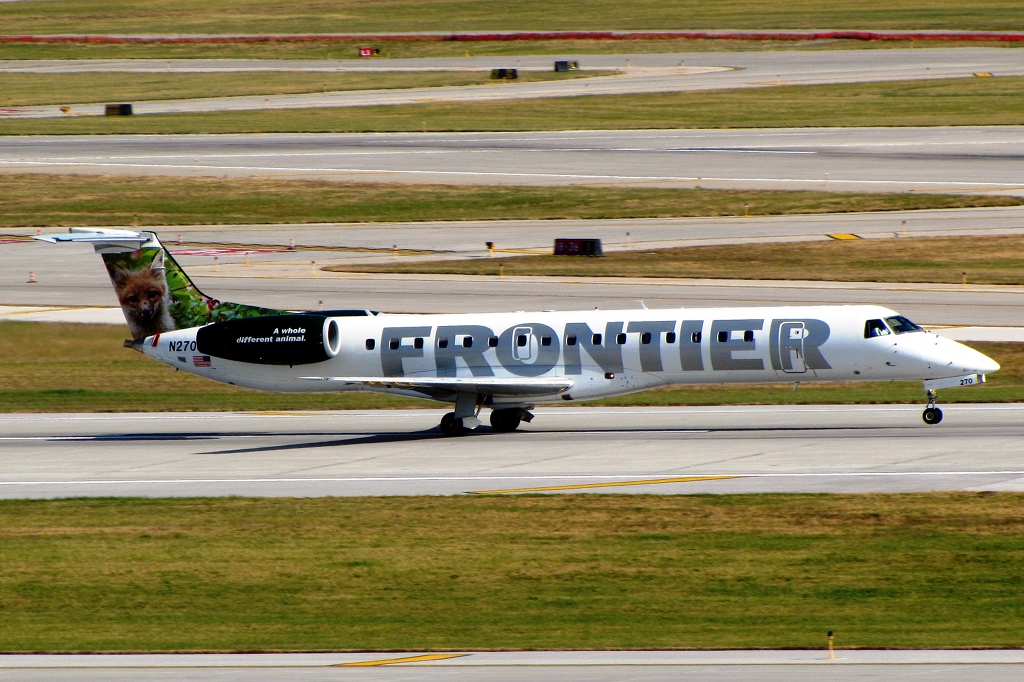
Frontier Express Embraer ERJ-145 operated by Chautauqua Airlines in 2011

==== Frontier JetExpress ====
In February 2002, the airline launched its first regional product, Frontier JetExpress, initially operated by Mesa Airlines using CRJ-200 regional jets. Similar to the "express" operations of other carriers, Frontier JetExpress was targeted for markets to and from Denver that do not generate traffic sufficient to support Frontier's smallest mainline jet, the Airbus A318, but could still offer lucrative business with a smaller jet.

The initial JetExpress partnership with Mesa ended in January 2004, when Horizon Air was selected to operate the routes. Horizon utilized slightly larger CRJ-700 regional jet aircraft on these routes. In August 2006, Frontier and Horizon planned to end their partnership. While Frontier was generally pleased with Horizon's operation, the carrier decided that it needed to revisit the agreement and find a provider with additional regional jets to grow the operation. The last of the CRJ-700s was returned to the Horizon Air fleet on November 30, 2007. As the service by Horizon Air was winding down in November 2007, Frontier had some flights operated by ExpressJet using Embraer 145 regional jets.

==== Lynx Aviation ====
On September 6, 2006, Frontier created a new division of the holding company, known as Lynx Aviation, to operate Bombardier Q400 aircraft beginning in May 2007. On December 5, 2007, Lynx Aviation received its operating certificate from the FAA. Lynx began passenger operations on the morning of December 6, 2007.

After commencing operations, Lynx provided service to 19 regional destinations: Albuquerque, Aspen, Billings, Boise, Bozeman, Colorado Springs, Durango, El Paso, Fargo, Grand Junction, Hayden/Steamboat Springs (seasonal), Jackson Hole (Seasonal), Kansas City, Oklahoma City, Omaha, Rapid City, Salt Lake City, Tulsa, and Wichita. Most cities were also served by mainline Frontier jets however Lynx provided the only Frontier service to Aspen, Billings, Bozeman, Colorado Springs, Grand Junction, and Hayden.

In 2012, the Lynx Aviation operation was folded into Republic Airways Holdings' subsidiary, Republic Airways. The remaining Q400 aircraft were withdrawn from Frontier service and placed in service for United Airlines, flying as United Express.

==== Republic Airways ====
Republic Airways operated Embraer 170 regional jets on behalf of Frontier in 2007 through mid 2008. Republic was also providing feeder service for Midwest Airlines and as Frontier and Midwest began merging in 2009, retaining the Frontier brand, Republic resumed service for Frontier with the Embraer 170s and also introduced larger Embraer 190 jets.

==== Chautauqua Airlines ====
Chautauqua Airlines had been operating feeder flights on behalf of Midwest Airlines and began service for Frontier with the merger of Frontier and Midwest in October 2010. Chautauqua operated up to 12 Embraer 135 and Embraer 145 jets out of Milwaukee. Frontier began branding these flights as Frontier Express in the spring of 2011. New service began in 2011 on three subsidized Essential Air Service routes to the cities of Rhinelander, Wisconsin, as well as Ironwood and Manistee, Michigan. However, Frontier almost immediately began a pull-down of the Milwaukee hub and by the end of 2012, the only route that continued to operate with a Frontier Express ERJ-145 jet was Milwaukee to Rhinelander. Service to Rhinelander ended on January 3, 2013, and Chautauqua transferred the remaining aircraft to other partners.

==== Maverick Airways ====
In early 1997, Maverick Airways was operating codeshare service for Frontier with de Havilland Canada DHC-7 Dash 7 STOL capable turboprops between Denver (DEN) and two destinations in Colorado: Grand Junction (GJT) and Steamboat Springs (SBS).

==== Aspen Mountain Air ====
From mid 1997 through mid 1998, Aspen Mountain Air operated codeshare service for Frontier from Denver to Aspen, CO, Bozeman, MT, and Sioux City, IA. The carrier flew Dornier 328 prop aircraft.

==== Great Lakes Airlines ====
Great Lakes Airlines also operated a codeshare service with Frontier from the early 2000s, until the airline shut down in 2018. Great Lakes provided connecting service to many smaller cities from the Denver hub as well as several other focus cities, using Beechcraft 1900D and Embraer EMB 120 Brasilia aircraft.

=== Airline branding ===
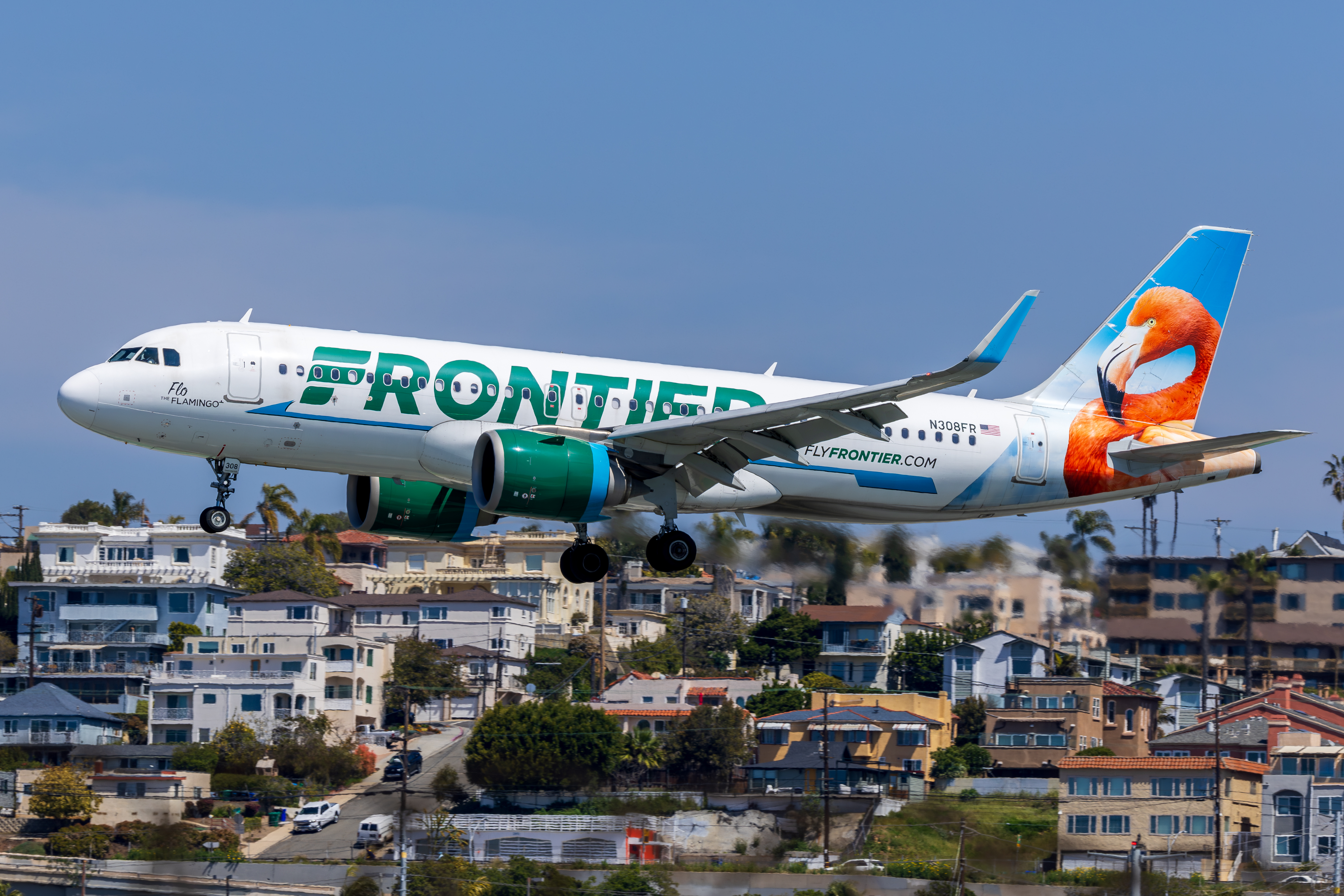
A Frontier Airbus A320neo in the animal tail livery. The animal’s name, “Flo the Flamingo”, is painted near the nose

From 1994 to 2001, the airline's livery consisted of green script "Frontier" titles on the forward fuselage, a small "Spirit of the West" slogan, and wildlife photography on the tail of each aircraft. Most Boeing 737 aircraft featured different imagery on both sides.

Beginning in 2001, a new livery was introduced on the airline's new Airbus A319s, with large silver "FRONTIER" titles on the sides of the aircraft, and the airline's "Spirit of the West" slogan, later changed to "A whole different animal." The animal tails were retained, although only one image per aircraft was now used. Though the airline's Boeing 737s remained in the fleet until 2005, none were repainted into this livery.

In April 2013, Frontier introduced a modified version of that livery, keeping the iconic animals on aircraft tails, but dropping its former slogan and replacing "FRONTIER" with "FLYFRONTIER.COM", the company's website, in support of new marketing that focused heavily on the airline's web presence. This livery was only painted on a few newly delivered aircraft. Aircraft in the older livery received "FLYFRONTIER.COM" titles on engine nacelles.

On September 9, 2014, Frontier introduced an updated livery, as part of a rebranding that saw the spokesanimals' roles increase. The new livery reintroduced a green "FRONTIER" typeface to the fuselage, featuring the stylized "F" designed by Saul Bass for the original Frontier when the carrier unveiled a new livery in 1978. The livery of 2014 also includes the traditional arrow used by the original Frontier prior to 1978. Each aircraft features the name of the animal featured on its tail near the nose of the aircraft for easier identification.

Animal concepts used in the livery extend into Frontier's marketing as well. Each animal has a specific name. Animal aircraft used in their radio and television commercials include Jack the rabbit, Grizwald the bear, Foxy the fox (for whom Jack has a crush), Flip the dolphin (who always gets stuck going to Chicago rather than the warmer climates the others are going to), Larry the lynx, Hector the sea otter, and Sal the cougar. New additions are Penguins Jim, Joe, Jay, and Gary, a barbershop-style quartet, singing the praises of EarlyReturns to an audience of Frontier's well-known characters from the "a whole different animal" campaign, Hector the otter, advertising Frontier's expanding service to Mexico, and Polly the Parrot, who won the new animal audition in 2012.

Expanding on these concepts in 2023, Frontier introduced a new approach with their animal mascots taking on various roles in a calendar titled "Fur & Feathers".

== Destinations ==
Countries and dependencies served by Frontier Airlines

Frontier Airlines operates a network consisting of both domestic and international destinations in the United States, Mexico, Central America, and the Caribbean.

Top airports by annual departures passengers 2024
Rank	Origin airport	Passengers	Annual change
1	Denver, Colorado	4,094,998	▲9.9%
2	Orlando, Florida	2,896,984	▼17.9%
3	Las Vegas, Nevada	1,966,306	▼12.4%
4	Atlanta, Georgia	1,886,718	▲3.8%
5	Philadelphia, Pennsylvania	1,817,243	▲4.7%
6	Dallas/Fort Worth, Texas	1,588,959	▲41.1%
7	Phoenix, Arizona	1,427,720	▲11.5%
8	San Juan, Puerto Rico	1,117,957	▲26.5%
9	Tampa, Florida	1,046,444	▲3.2%
10	Cleveland, Ohio	1,043,741	▲25.7%

=== Codeshare agreements ===
Frontier has a codeshare agreement with Volaris.

== Fleet ==
=== Current fleet ===
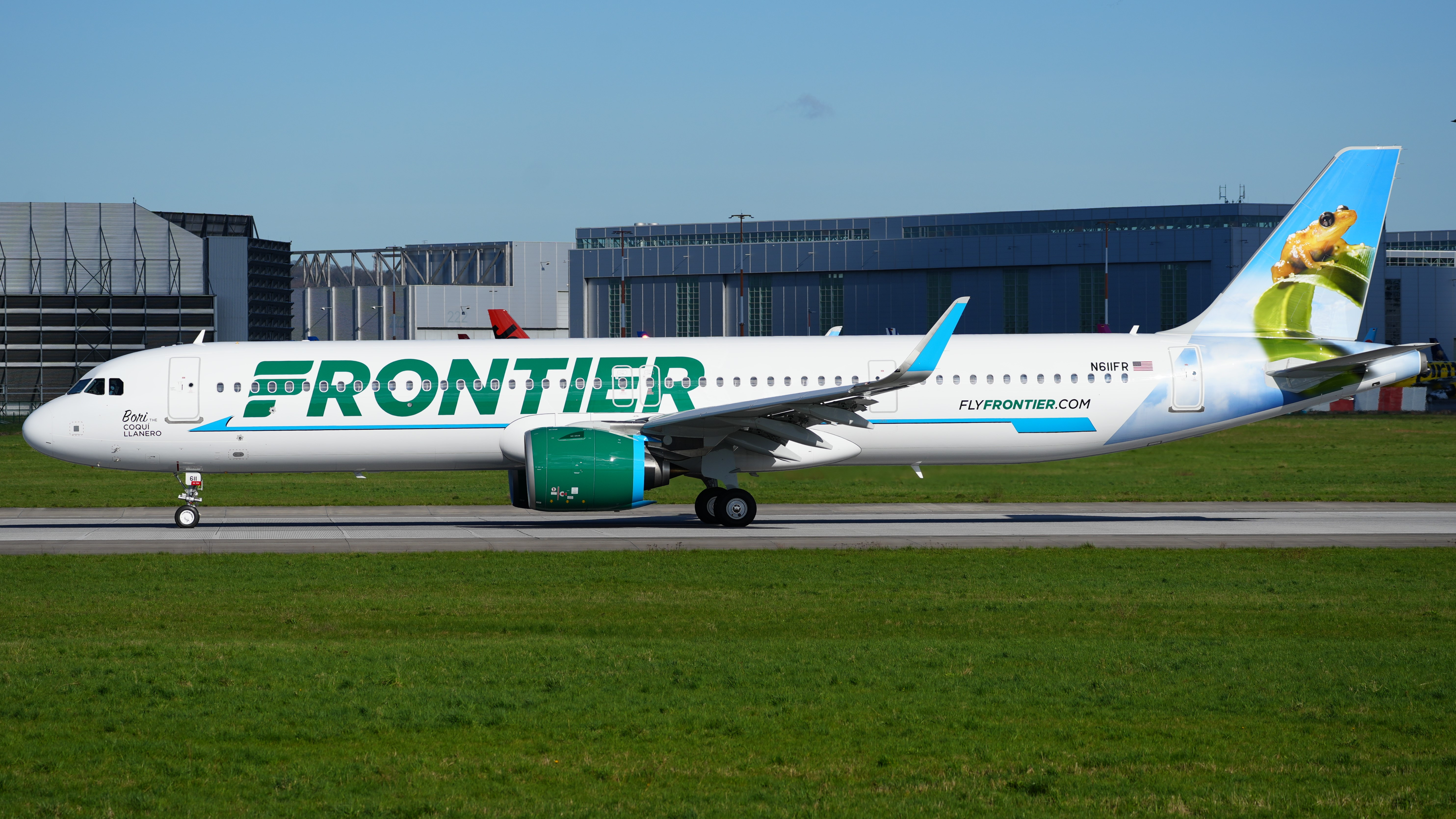
Frontier Airlines Airbus A321neo in one of the airline's many animal liveries, with this tail featuring the coquí llanero (pictured in 2023)

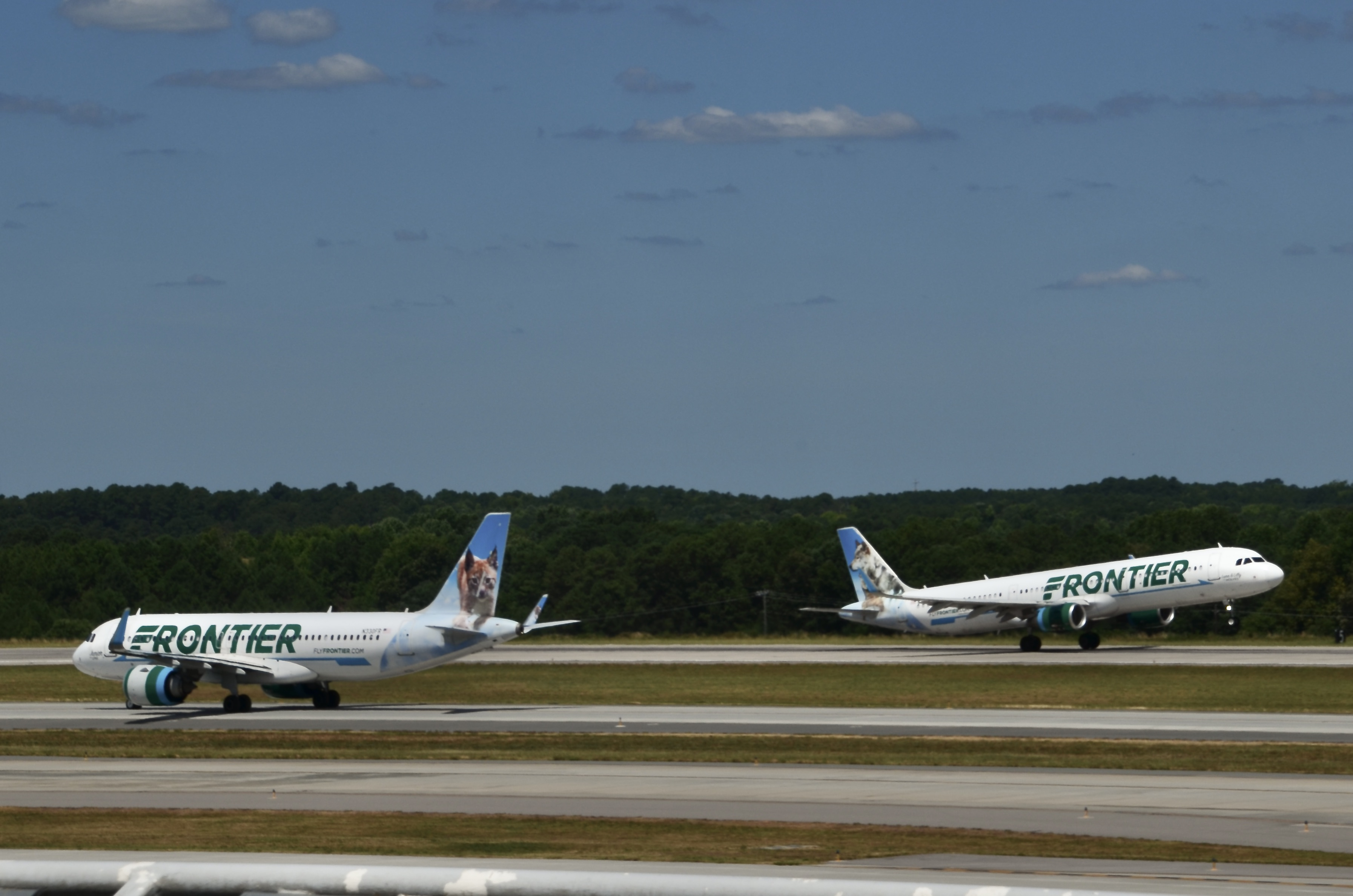
Two Frontier Airlines aircraft, one Airbus A320neo (N330FR) and one A321-200 (N717FR) at Raleigh–Durham International Airport (pictured in 2024)

As of May 2026, Frontier Airlines operates an all-Airbus A320 family fleet composed of the following aircraft:

Frontier Airlines fleet
Aircraft	In service	Orders	Passengers	Notes
Airbus A320-200	6	—	180	Older aircraft to be phased out.
Airbus A320neo	94	6	186	Deliveries begin 2031. 24 aircraft to be removed by June 2026.
Airbus A321-200	21	—	230	Older aircraft to be phased out.
Airbus A321neo	62	136	240	Deliveries begin 2031.
Total	174	151		

=== Fleet development ===
During the 2011 Paris Air Show, Republic Airways Holdings ordered 60 Airbus A320neo aircraft and 20 Airbus A319neo aircraft for Frontier. In 2014, the airline ordered 19 Airbus A321neo aircraft. In October 2016, Frontier Airlines took delivery of its first Airbus A320neo aircraft and became the second US operator of the type after Spirit Airlines.

On November 15, 2017, Frontier Airlines announced a $15 billion order for 134 additional A320neo family aircraft. The order, slightly revised under new owner Indigo, consisted of 100 A320neos and 34 A321neos. The order also included the conversion of the remaining A319neo to A320neo. With this order, Frontier Airlines fleet sought industry-leading fuel efficiency as well as one of the youngest and most modern fleets, particularly in comparison to other low-cost carriers, (Note: For comparison, fleet ages as of 2018: Southwest, 10.7 years; JetBlue, 9.7 years; Spirit, 5.4 years; WestJet, 9.7 years; Volaris, 4.3 years, Allegiant, 17 years, VivaAerobús, 5.2 years; Sun Country, 14.4 years. Information from . (listed airlines from List of largest airlines in North America)) with an average fleet age of five years as of 2018.

==== Cabin ====
At the end of 2025, Frontier Airlines began receiving A320neo aircraft equipped with the Airspace cabin, which now includes enhanced mood lighting, revised PSUs and overhead bins, along with minor cosmetic changes throughout.

==== Engine ====
As of 2025, Frontier Airlines has begun operating A320neos (including the A321neo) with a mix of General Electric (CFM) LEAP-1A and Pratt & Whitney PW1100G GTF engines. When the order for A320neos was placed in 2016, the initial selection was exclusively for the LEAP-1A. However, in 2021 Frontier Airlines transitioned remaining A320neo orders to come with the PW1100G.

=== Historical fleet ===
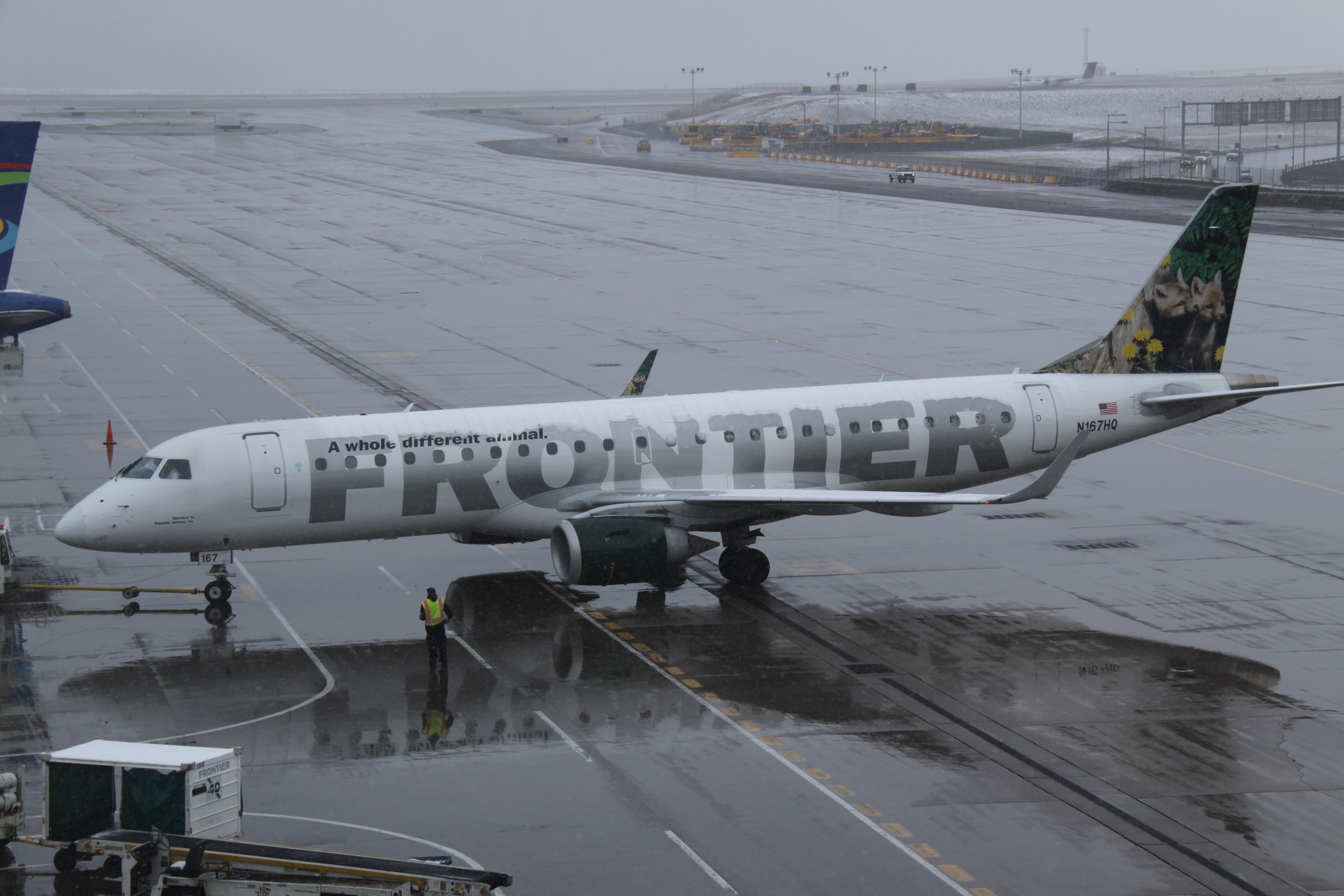
Frontier Airlines Embraer E190 operated by Republic Airways seen in 2013. This aircraft was later involved in an accident with another airline in 2018.

In the past, Frontier Airlines has operated the following aircraft types:

Frontier Airlines historical fleet
Aircraft	Total	Introduced	Retired	Replacement	Notes
Airbus A318-100	11	2003	2013	Airbus A320 family	Launch customer.
Airbus A319-100	53	2001	2021	Airbus A320neo	
Boeing 737-200	12	1994	2006	Airbus A320 family	
Boeing 737-300	19	1995	2005	Airbus A320 family	
Bombardier CRJ200	6	2004	2006	Bombardier CRJ700	Operated by Mesa Airlines.
Bombardier CRJ700	6	2004	2006	De Havilland Canada Dash 8-400	Operated by Horizon Air.
De Havilland Canada Dash 8-400	11	2007	2012	None	Operated by Lynx Aviation.
Embraer E170	10	2010	2013	Airbus A320 family	Operated by Republic Airways.
Embraer E190	13	2010	2013	Airbus A320 family	Operated by Republic Airways.

== Services and seating ==
=== Services ===
As an ultra low-cost carrier (ULCC), Frontier imposes fees for additional amenities and services, such as for advance seat reservation and baggage allowance, the waiving of fees associated with changing or canceling itineraries, and operates a buy on board service for in-flight catering. Prior to its transition to an ULCC, the airline offered DirecTV channels on seat-mounted electronic screens for an additional fee. Following the removal of the electronic screens from its seats, the airline has not offered any in-flight entertainment options. In May 2024, Frontier introduced a low-cost bundled fare option called "BizFare," which includes seat selection, a carry-on bag, and flexibility to change flights without penalty.

Frontier Airlines currently offers three bundle options, which give every passenger the opportunity to upgrade their ticket to a service level that meets their needs or may be better-aligned with legacy carriers. Any passenger who purchases a bundle has zero change or cancellation fees.

Economy Bundle includes a personal item, carry-on bag, standard seat selection, and no change or cancel fee. Premium Bundle includes all of Economy, plus premium seat selection and "Board First" with reserved overhead bin space. Business Bundle includes everything from Economy and Premium, plus 2 checked bags (50 lbs max, each) and an UpFront Plus seat (empty middle or 2x2 seating).

=== Seating ===
Frontier's aircraft are configured in all-economy class seating in a 3–3 layout. Seats on its A320 aircraft have 28 inches (71 cm) to 30 inches (76 cm) of seat pitch, and seats on its A321 aircraft have 30 inches (76 cm) to 32 inches (81 cm) of seat pitch. At 19 inches (48 cm) wide, the middle seats on Frontier's aircraft are wider than the window and aisle seats. Seats do not have adjustable recline, with the exception of some premium "Stretch" seats in an exit row or near the bulkheads, which have an additional 5 inches (13 cm) to 8 inches (20 cm) of seat pitch.

Premium Seating

In 2026, Frontier Airlines will be rolling out a First Class hard product with seats designed by Geven (an Italian company). Frontier's First Class seats are expected to be in a traditional 2x2 seating, with some service enhancements planned. The First Class seats will be offered on-board alongside the current UpFront Plus upgraded seating option, which provide a window or aisle seat with a guaranteed empty middle seat and additional legroom in the front of the cabin (for expedited boarding and deplaning).

== Frequent-flyer program ==
Frontier Miles is the airline's frequent-flyer program, which replaced the EarlyReturns program that operated from 2003 to 2018. Originally a distance-based accrual program, it transitioned to a revenue-based accrual program in 2024, where Frontier Miles are accrued based on the amount spent on travel with the airline, or alternatively through co-branded products and services. Miles can be redeemed for travel with the airline; previously, the airline allowed miles to also be redeemed for other products and services.

The program has four tiers of elevated frequent flyer status, consisting of Elite Silver, Gold, Platinum, and Diamond. Prior to the revamp of the program in 2024, it had three tiers consisting of Elite 20k, 50k, and 100k. Elite benefits progressively include more and more complimentary services and amenities, such as advance seat assignments, baggage allowance, or priority boarding.

== Accidents and incidents ==
- On November 30, 2018, a Frontier Airlines Airbus A320-200, (registered N227FR) operating as Frontier Airlines Flight 260, had its engine fan cowlings ripped off during take-off. The crew stated that a foreign object on the runway may have caused it. Although this did not interfere with the aircraft's engine functionality, the crew decided to perform a precautionary emergency landing. No one aboard was injured.
- On Saturday, October 5, 2024, a Frontier Airlines Airbus A321 operating as Flight 1326 from San Diego, caught fire while landing at Las Vegas, Nevada. The pilots declared an emergency and the flight landed without injuries to its 197 occupants.
- On April 15, 2025, a Frontier Airlines Airbus A321neo (registered N607FR) operating Frontier Airlines Flight 3506, from Orlando aborted landing at San Juan after sustained damage to its nose landing gear after making a hard landing, leaving debris on the runway, during the go around the aircraft's left engine emitted flames during its climb-out. In response, both runways at the airport were closed to allow for inspection and clearance of debris. The aircraft was then directed to land on runway 08, the airport's secondary runway, resulting in delays for incoming flights. The crew was able to safely guide the aircraft back to the airport, where all 228 passengers deplaned without any reported injuries.
- On May 8, 2026, a Frontier Airlines Airbus A321neo, operating as Flight 4345, bound for Los Angeles, aborted takeoff after hitting a pedestrian who jumped from a perimeter fence and crossed the runway at Denver International Airport. The pedestrian was killed instantly, and the engine briefly caught fire and sustained damage. Smoke was also reported to be inside the cabin, but all 224 passengers and 7 crew members were safely evacuated. Twelve people on board were injured, all minor, with five being taken to local hospitals.

== See also ==
- List of Colorado companies
- Air transportation in the United States
