= 2022 in art =

The year 2022 in art involved various significant events.

== Events ==
- February - Twenty five works by the Ukrainian painter Maria Prymachenko are believed to have been destroyed by a fire which consumed the Ivankiv Historical and Local History Museum (where they were housed) in Ivankiv, Kyiv Oblast, Ukraine during the Russian Invasion of Ukraine.
- April 9 - The Museum of Contemporary Art San Diego opens to the public after a five-year, $105 million overhaul.
- May - French authorities charge former President of the Louvre, Jean-Luc Martinez with money laundering in conjunction with an art trafficking case.
- May 8 - The Andy Warhol silk-screen painting Sage Blue Shot Marilyn (1964) sells at Christie's in New York City for $195.04 million (with fees) shattering the record for a price paid at auction for a work by an American artist, besting the previous mark set by Jean-Michel Basquiat's 1982 painting Untitled which sold for $110,500,000 in 2017. It also became the most expensive 20th century artwork sold in a public sale. The buyer was the American art dealer Larry Gagosian.
- May 14 - An original print of Man Ray's Le Violon d'Ingres sells for $12.4 million US (with fees) at Christie's in New York City making it the most expensive photograph ever sold at auction.
- May 31 - At the Louvre in Paris a male provocateur initially disguised as an elderly female art-goer in a wheelchair smears the bulletproof glass on top of the Mona Lisa by Leonardo da Vinci with cake. He later reveals that he believes that he was engaged in some sort of makeshift climate protest. The still unidentified 36-year-old man was subsequently placed in psychiatric care.
- June 23 - The Orlando Museum of Art in Orlando, Florida is raided by the FBI who seize 25 suspect paintings potentially fraudulently attributed to Jean-Michel Basquiat. The museum's director, Aaron De Groft who staged the exhibition of the works at the art institution is fired five days later.
- July 4 - The Hay Wain (completed 1821) by the English landscape painter John Constable (1776–1837), and regarded as his most famous image, is subjected to two Just Stop Oil protestors attaching their own modified "apocalyptic vision of the future" version of the painting to the original and gluing themselves to the frame. The National Gallery later reports that the surface varnish of the painting and its frame suffered minor damage.
- October 9 - Two Extinction Rebellion activists glue themselves to Pablo Picasso's Massacre in Korea painting at the National Gallery of Victoria in Melbourne.
- October
  - On October 14 activists from Just Stop Oil throw tomato soup onto Vincent van Gogh's Sunflowers at the National Gallery in London then glue themselves to the wall beneath the painting. Subsequently, on October 23 in a second incident, German climate action activists at the Museum Barberini in Potsdam throw mashed potatoes onto the Claude Monet painting Grainstacks (1890) and then make similar statements and demands.
  - It is noted that Piet Mondrian's New York City I (1941), now in the Kunstsammlung Nordrhein-Westfalen in Düsseldorf, has been hung upside down since first being put on public display in 1945.
- November 9
  - The Paul Allen collection is sold off at Christie's in New York City and shatters all previous records for proceeds from an auction of a singular art collection at more than $1.5 billion US. All funds are to be donated to Allen's philanthropic endeavors. Among the records set for prices for a work by an individual artist were $149.2 million US for Les Poseuses, Ensemble (Petite version) (1888) by the French Pointillist Georges Seurat, $138 million US for the painting La Montagne Sainte-Victoire by the French Post-Impressionist Paul Cézanne setting a new mark for a price paid for his work at auction, $104.6 million US for Birch Forest (1903) by the Austrian Symbolist Gustav Klimt setting an auction record for his work, and $11.5 million US for a 1905 print of a photograph by Edward Steichen, The Flatiron, a record for the photographer.
  - A seven foot high statue of Queen Elizabeth II carved from eight tons of limestone is unveiled at York Minster cathedral by King Charles III and Queen Camilla during an official visit to Yorkshire in York, England.
- December 3 - Sydney Modern Project a A$344 extension to the Art Gallery of NSW opens to the public.

== Exhibitions ==
- January 31 until June 5 - Charles Ray: Figure Ground at the Metropolitan Museum of Art in New York City.
- January 13 until February 20 - 1970S/Graffiti/Today at Phillips in New York City,
- February 3 until April 16 - Ed Kerns: Interconnected at Lafayette College in Easton, Pennsylvania.
- February 4 until May 30 - Emil Memmon: Saintly bodies at the Loža Gallery in Koper, Slovenia (with guest artist Natsumi Goldfish).
- February 11 until April 17 - Tomás Saraceno: Particular Matter(s) at The Shed at Hudson Yards in New York City.
- February 11 until May 15 - Holbein: Capturing Character at the Morgan Library and Museum in New York City.
- February 17 until May 15 - Jacques Louis David: Radical Draftsman at the Metropolitan Museum of Art in New York City.
- February 24 until August 29 - Surrealism Beyond Borders at the Tate Modern in London, England.
- March 3 until April 14 - Dorothea Tanning: Doesn't the Paint Say it All at the Kasmin Gallery in New York City.
- March 3 until July 24 - Bridget Riley: Perceptual Abstraction at the Yale Center for British Art at Yale University in New Haven, Connecticut.
- April 11 until July 31 - Sean Scully: The Shape of Ideas at the Philadelphia Museum of Art in Philadelphia, Pennsylvania (originated at the Modern Art Museum of Fort Worth in Fort Worth, Texas).
- May 4 until September 4 - Archipenko and the Italian Avant-Garde at the Estorick Collection of Modern Italian Art in London, England.
- May 5 until July 22 - Nicole Eisenman: Untitled (Show) at Hauser & Wirth in New York City.
- May 5 into February 27, 2023 - Monet - Mitchell at the Louis Vuitton Foundation in Paris, France.
- May 14 until October 2 - Nick Cave: Forothemore at the Museum of Contemporary Art, Chicago in Chicago, Illinois.
- May 20 until October 16 - Marc Quinn: History Paintings + at the Yale Center for British Art at Yale University in New Haven, Connecticut.
- May 22 until October 23 - Salman Toor: No Ordinary Love at the Baltimore Museum of Art in Baltimore, Maryland.
- May 25 until September 11 - Sam Gilliam: Full Circle at the Hirshhorn Museum and Sculpture Garden in Washington DC.
- July 22 until January 8, 2023 - New York: 1962-1964 at The Jewish Museum in New York City.
- September 9 until March 12, 2023 - Łempicka at the National Museum in Kraków.
- September 23 until January 8, 2023 - Bernardo Bellotto. On the 300th Anniversary of the Painter's Birthday at the Royal Castle in Warsaw.
- October 18 until February 20, 2023 - Alex Katz: Gathering at the Solomon R. Guggenheim Museum in New York City.
- October 18 until January 8, 2023 - Ugo Rondinone: The water is a poem, unwritten by the air, no. the earth is a poem, unwritten by the fire at the Petit Palais in Paris.
- October 20 until January 22, 2023 - Cubism and the Trompe l'Oeil Tradition at the Metropolitan Museum of Art in New York City.
- October 22 until April 9, 2023 - Frank Bowling's Americas at the Boston Museum of Fine Arts in Boston, Massachusetts.
- October 27 until December 17 - Pawel Althamer: Polish Sculpture at Anton Kern Gallery in New York City.
- November 3 until December 23, 2022 - David Hockney:20 Flowers and Some Bigger Pictures at Annely Juda Fine Art in London,
- November 6 until April 30, 2023 - Henry Taylor: B Side at MOCA, Los Angeles in Los Angeles, California, then traveled to the Whitney Museum of American Art in New York City from October 4, 2023, until January 26, 2024.
- Ongoing - Ricky Brown: Really Bad Portraits in Washington Square Park in New York City.

== Works ==
- Ferdi Alıcı - The Eye of Mexico in Mexico City, Mexico
- Meriem Bennani - Windy commissioned for a. Installed on the High line in New York City.
- William Behrends - Statue of Tom Seaver (permanently installed at Citi Field in Queens, New York)
- Richard Bossons - Statue of Queen Elizabeth II at York Minster Cathedral in York, England
- Sandy Brown - Earth Goddess (installed in St Austell, Cornwall)
- Branly Cadet - Statue of Sandy Koufax (permanently installed at Dodger Stadium in Los Angeles, California)
- Alex Da Corte - ROY G BIV (commissioned for and exhibited at the 2022 Whitney Biennial)
- Denise Dutton - Statue of Mary Anning
- Michael Heizer - City in Garden Valley, Lincoln County, Nevada, USA (begun in 1972 and completed in 2022)
- David Hockney - Harry Styles, 31st May 2022
- Dmitry Iv - Shoot Yourself (sculpture) in Kyiv, Ukraine
- Douglas Jennings - Statue of Margaret Thatcher (Grantham)
- Samson Kambalu - Antelope (on the Fourth plinth, Trafalgar Square, London)
- Matthew Mazzotta - Phoebe the Flamingo installed at the main terminal at Tampa International Airport
- Robin Kid - God Bless our Broken Home
- Eduardo Kobra - For the planet (mural on the side of the United Nations Headquarters in New York City)
- Hew Locke - Procession (sculptural mixed-media assemblage installation) in the Duveen Galleries of the Tate Britain in London
- Jesse Pallotta - A Love Letter to Marsha
- Donato Piccolo - Quando il fiore muore, il pensiero percuote
- Allison Saar - Statue of Lorraine Hansberry
- Francine Tint - Morth County Fair
- Kara Walker - Unmanned Drone (created from a reconfiguration of an Equestrian statue of Stonewall Jackson by Charles Keck in Charlottesville, Virginia, which stood in the city from 1924 until its removal in 2021)
- Basil Watson - National Windrush Monument

== Awards ==
- HOME (Phoebe the Flamingo) - CODA award in the Transportation category
- Bucksbaum Prize (Whitney Biennial 2022) - Ralph Lemon
- Golden Lion for Best National Participation (59th International Art Exhibition of La Biennale di Venezia) - Great Britain, Sonia Boyce: Feeling Her Way
- Golden Lion for best film (79th Venice International Film Festival) - Laura Poitras's documentary "All the Beauty and the Bloodshed"
- Palme d'Or for best film (Cannes Film Festival) - Ruben Östlund's "Triangle of Sadness"
- Oscar for best picture - Sian Heder's CODA

== Film, television series, and plays ==
- Dalíland
- Notre-Dame on Fire
- The Andy Warhol Diaries
- The Collaboration

== Deaths ==
- January 1
  - Pierre Parsus, 100, French painter and illustrator
  - Calisto Tanzi, 83, Italian art collector and convicted fraudster
- January 4 - Craig Ruddy, 53, Australian artist and Archibald Prize winner (COVID-19)
- January 14 - Ricardo Bofill, 82, Spanish architect
- January 15 - Hossein Valamanesh, 72, Iranian-Australian artist
- January 16
  - Tova Berlinski, 106, Polish-born Israeli painter
  - Alekos Fassianos, 86, Greek painter
  - Andrei Mudrea, 67, Moldovan painter and plastic artist
- January 24 - Sven Lukin, 87–88, Latvian-born American painter
- January 31 - James Bidgood, 88, American filmmaker, photographer, and visual and performance artist
- February 7 - Dan Lacey, 61, American painter
- February 10 - John Wesley, 93, American painter
- February 12 - Carmen Herrera, 106, Cuban-born American artist
- February 17 - John Scott, 71, Canadian artist
- February 19
  - Marino Golinelli, 101, Italian art collector
  - Dan Graham, 79, American artist
  - Jan Pieńkowski, 85, Polish-born British illustrator
- February 22 - DeWain Valentine, 86, American sculptor
  - Lewis Stein - 76–77, American conceptual artist
- February 26
  - Antonio Seguí, 88, Argentine cartoonist and painter
  - Srihadi Soedarsono, 90, Indonesian painter
- February 27 - Nick Zedd, 63, American filmmaker and painter
- March 1 - Conrad Janis, 94, American actor, art dealer, and son of Sidney Janis
- March 13 - Albert Kresch, 99, American painter
- March 18 - Budi Tek, 65, Indonesian art collector
- March 28 - Mira Calix, 52, South African-born British visual artist and musician
- March 29 - Ted Mooney, 70, American novelist and Art journalist (Art in America)
- March 31 - Patrick Demarchelier, 78, French photographer
- April 1 - Eleanor Munro, 94, American art critic, art historian, and writer
- April 4 -
  - Donald Baechler, 65, American painter
  - Jerry Uelsmann, 87, American photographer
- April 6 - David McKee, 87, British illustrator
- April 18 - Hermann Nitsch, 83, Austrian artist (Viennese Actionism)
- April 21 - Cynthia Plaster Caster, 74, American artist
- April 22 - Marcus Leatherdale, 69, Canadian photographer
- April 23 - Enoch Kelly Haney, 81, American sculptor and painter
- April 30 - Ron Galella 91, American photographer
- May 7 - Suzi Gablik 87, American artist, and art critic
- May 10 - Enrique Metinides, 88, Mexican crime photographer
- May 15 - Knox Martin, 99, American painter
- May 18 - Bob Neuwirth, 82, American Musician, singer-performer, and painter
- May 22 - Miss.Tic, 66, French street artist
- May 24 - David Datuna, 48, Georgian born American artist
- May 27 - Claude Rutault, 80, French painter
- June 5 - Christopher Pratt, 86, Canadian painter and printmaker
- June 6 - Jacques Villeglé, 96, French mixed-media artist
- June 8 - Paula Rego, 87, Portuguese-British visual artist
- June 11 - Duncan Hannah, 69, American painter
- June 12
  - Tarek Al-Ghoussein, 60, Kuwaiti visual and performance artist
  - Heidi Horten, 81, Austrian art collector
- June 15
  - June 15 - Juan Pablo Echeverri, 43, Colombian visual artist
  - June 15 - Arnold Skolnick, 85, American graphic artist
- June 21 - Harvey Dinnerstein, 94, American artist
- June 25 - Sam Gilliam, 88, American painter
- June 26 - Margaret Keane, 94, American painter
- July 2 - David Blackwood, 80, Canadian visual artist
- July 4 - Kazuki Takahashi, 60, Japanese manga artist
- July 9
  - Matt King, 37, American visual artist, co-founder of Meow Wolf
  - Lily Safra, 87, Brazilian-Monegasque art collector
- July 18
  - Maya Attoun, 48, Israeli artist,
  - Claes Oldenburg, 93, Swedish-born American sculptor
- July 22 - Emilie Benes Brzezinski, 90, American sculptor
- July 25 - Jennifer Bartlett, 81, American painter
- July 29 - Mary Obering, 85, American painter
- August 2 - Velichko Minekov, 93, Bulgarian sculptor
- August 5 - Issey Miyake, 84, Japanese fashion designer
- August 9 - Raymond Briggs, 88, British author and illustrator
- August 12 - Natalia LL, 85, Polish artist
- August 13 - Marta Palau Bosch, 88, Spanish-born Mexican artist
- August 14 - Dmitri Vrubel, 62, Russian painter
- August 21 - Oliver Frey, 74, Swiss visual artist
- August 24 - Lily Renée, 101, Austrian-born American comic book artist
- August 25 - Charlie Finch, 68, American art critic (death announced on this date)
- September 5 - Virginia Dwan, 90, American art dealer
- September 8
  - Jens Birkemose, 79, Danish painter
  - James Polshek, 92, American architect (Clinton Presidential Center, Brooklyn Museum)
- September 13
  - Jean-Luc Godard 91, French filmmaker
  - Roxanne Lowit, 81, American fashion photographer
- October 8
  - Brigida Baltar, 62, Brazilian visual artist
  - Billy Al Bengston, 88, American visual artist
  - Grace Glueck, 96, American art critic (The New York Times)
- October 11
  - Harold Garde, 99, American painter
  - Angus Trumble, 58, Australian art curator and historian, director of the National Portrait Gallery of Australia (2014–2018) to (death announced on this date)
- October 16 - Jüri Arrak, 85, Estonian painter
- October 17 - Jagoda Buić, 92, Croatian visual artist
- October 21 - Peter Schjeldahl, 80, American art critic (The New Yorker, The New York Times, ARTnews) and poet
- October 22 - Rodney Graham, 73, Canadian visual artist
- October 24 - Laila Shawa, 82, Palestinian visual artist
- October 26 - Pierre Soulages, 102, French visual artist
- November 2 - Nicholas Harding, 66, English-born Australian painter, Archibald Prize winner (2001)
- November 7 - Brian O'Doherty, 94, Irish American artist and art critic
- November 8 - Lee Bontecou, 91, American sculptor
- November 10 - Hervé Télémaque, 85, Haitian-born French painter
- November 28 - Tom Phillips, 85, English artist (A Humument)
- November 30 - Ashley Bickerton, 63, Barbadian-born American artist
- December 3 - Larry Qualls, American art editor and documentarian
- December 7 - Ronald Sherr, 70, American portrait artist
- December 9 - Judith Lauand, 100, Brazilian painter and printmaker
- December 17 - Philip Pearlstein, 98, American painter
- December 20 - Maya Widmaier-Picasso, 87, French art curator
- December 21 - Franz Gertsch, 92, Swiss painter
- December 26 - Dorothy Iannone, 89, American visual artist
- December 28
  - Arata Isozaki, 91, Japanese architect (Kitakyushu Municipal Museum of Art, MOCA, Nagi Museum Of Contemporary Art)
  - Tony Vaccaro, 100, American photographer
- Full date unknown
  - M. Henry Jones, 65, American visual artist, animator, and filmmaker
