= Kid =

Kid often refers to:

- Colloquial term for a child, offspring, or young person
- To engage in joking

Kid, Kids, KIDS, and K.I.D.S. may also refer to:

== Animals ==
- A young goat
  - The goat meat of young goats
  - Kidskin, leather from young goats

== Entertainment and art ==
=== Characters ===
- Kid Sampson, in the novel Catch-22 by Joseph Heller
- Kid, in the 1978 film Jubilee played by Adam Ant
- Ward "Kid Galahad" Guisenberry, in the 1937 film Kid Galahad
- Kid (Chrono Cross), in the PlayStation role-playing game Chrono Cross
- Kid Flash, name of several DC Comics characters
- Eustass 'Captain' Kid, in the manga One Piece
- Kaito Kid ("Phantom Thief Kid"), in the manga Magic Kaito
- Death the Kid, commonly referred to as Kid, in the manga Soul Eater
- Kid, in Bastion, an Xbox 360 Arcade/PC game
- Kid, in Jak II video game

=== Film and television ===
- Kid (1990 film), an American thriller starring C. Thomas Howell
- Kid (2012 film), a Belgian film
- "Kid" (Not Going Out), a 2006 television episode
- Kids (film), a 1995 American drama directed by Larry Clark
- Kids, a Taiwanese film starring Edward Chen
- "Kids" (Rules of Engagement), a 2007 television episode

=== Literature ===
- Kid (poetry collection), a 1992 collection of poems by Simon Armitage

=== Music ===
==== Performers ====
- K.I.D (band), Canadian indie rock band
- K.I.D. (musician), a disco project by Geoff Bastow
- Kid 'n Play, American hip-hop duo from New York
- Kid Capri (born 1967), American DJ and rapper
- Kid Carpet, musician from Bristol, UK
- Kid Crème (born 1974), house music producer and DJ
- Kid Cudi (born 1984), American rapper Scott Ramon Seguro Mescudi
- Kid Ink (born 1986; Brian Todd Collins), American rapper
- Kid Jensen (born 1950; David Jensen), Canadian-British radio DJ
- Kid Ory (1886–1973), American jazz trombonist and bandleader
- Kid Rock (born 1971), American singer Robert James Ritchie
- Kid Creole (born 1950), American musician August Darnell, leader of Kid Creole and the Coconuts
- The Kid Laroi (born 2003), Australian rapper and singer-songwriter Charlton Howard

==== Albums ====
- K.I.D.S., by Mac Miller, 2010
- K.I.D.S. (EP), by Tiny Masters of Today, 2006
- Kids (The Midnight album), 2018
- Kids (Noga Erez album), 2021
- Kids: Live at Dizzy's Club Coca-Cola, by Hank Jones and Joe Lovano, 2007

==== Songs ====
- "Kid" (Peter Andre song), a 2014 song
- "Kid" (Pretenders song), 1979
- "Kid", a song by Green Apple Quick Step
- "Kid", a song by Imagine Dragons from Loom, 2024
- "Kids" (MGMT song), 2008
- "Kids" (OneRepublic song), 2016
- "Kids" (Style of Eye song), 2013
- "Kids" (Robbie Williams and Kylie Minogue song), 2000
- "Kids", a song by Dev from the 2014 EP Bittersweet July
- "Kids", a song from the 1960 musical Bye Bye Birdie
- "Kids", a song by Ben Rector from the 2018 album Magic
- "Kids", a song by Hedley from the 2015 album Hello
- "Kids", a song by The Latency from the 2009 album The Latency
- "Kids (Keep Up)", a song by Childish Gambino from the 2011 album Camp

== Organizations and brands ==
- Kids In Danger, working against consumer product hazards to children
- Kennebec Intra-District Schools

=== Television channels and program blocks ===
- BFBS 3 Kids, a defunct television channel of the British Forces Broadcasting Service
- Carlton Kids, a defunct British television channel
- CBC Kids
- Discovery Kids
- Kids TV, a defunct New Zealand television production company
- Kids' WB
- Just Kids!, a former Indian television programming block
- Panda Kids, a Portuguese television channel
- PBS Kids, a brand for children's programming on the US Public Broadcasting Service
  - PBS Kids Sprout
- RTÉ Kids
- UPN Kids
- Universal Kids

=== Radio ===
- KID (AM), a defunct radio station (590 AM) formerly licensed to serve Idaho Falls, Idaho, United States
- KWFI-FM, a radio station (96.1 FM) licensed to serve Aberdeen, Idaho, which held the call sign KID-FM from 1965 to 1989 and from 1992 to 2018
- KIDS (FM) (88.1 FM), a radio station licensed to Grants, New Mexico, U.S.

== Science and technology ==
- KID (spacecraft) (Kestrel Initial Demonstrator), a small experimental space capsule
- Kid (templating language), a template engine for XML-based vocabularies written in Python
- KID (Kindle Imagine Develop), a Japanese game company
- Aquilair Kid, a French ultralight trike design
- Kinetic inductance detector, a type of superconducting photon detector
- KIDS (disease), Koala Immune Deficiency Syndrome
- .kid and .kids, Proposed top-level domains for websites intended for children
- KID, a portion of a p300/CBP-related protein

== People ==
- Kid (nickname), a list of people with the nickname or ring name
- Kid Chan (born 1978), international wedding photojournalist from Malaysia

== Transport ==
- KID, National Rail station code for Kidderminster railway station in England
- KID, IATA code for Kristianstad Airport, Sweden

== Other uses ==
- County Kildare, Ireland, Chapman code KID
- King's Indian Defence, in chess
- Save the Kids token, a cryptocurrency pump and dump scheme which traded as $KIDS

== See also ==
- The Kid (disambiguation)
- Kidd (disambiguation)
- Kidz (disambiguation)
- Kydd (disambiguation)
