= The Kid =

The Kid or The Kids may refer to:

== Fictional characters ==
- The kid (Blood Meridian), a character in Cormac McCarthy's 1985 novel Blood Meridian
- The Kid (The Matrix), a character in the Matrix film series
- The Kid (The Stand), a character in Stephen King's 1978 novel The Stand
- Marshall Eriksen or The Kid, a character in How I Met Your Mother
- The Kid, a character in the 1984 film Purple Rain, played by Prince
- The Kid, the narrator of Samuel R. Delany's 1975 novel Dhalgren
- The Kid, a character in Bastion
- The Kid, a character in Driver: Parallel Lines
- The Kid, a character in Freedom Fighters
- The Kid, a character in I Wanna Be the Guy
- The Kid, a character in Jak II

== Films ==
- The Kid (1910 film), a film by Frank Powell
- The Kid (1921 film), a Charlie Chaplin film
- The Kid (1950 film), a Hong Kong film that stars a young Bruce Lee
- The Kid (1997 film), a film featuring Rod Steiger
- The Kid (1999 film), a Hong Kong film
- Disney's The Kid, a 2000 film starring Bruce Willis
- The Kid (2001 film), an animated TV film based on a story by Gahan Wilson
- The Kid (2010 film), an adaptation by Nick Moran of Kevin Lewis's book
- The Kids (film), a 2015 Taiwanese film
- The Kid (2019 film), a film by Vincent D'Onofrio

== Literature ==
- The Kid (Savage book), a 1999 book by Dan Savage
- The Kid (novel), a 2016 novel by Ron Hansen
- The Kids, a 2021 poetry book by Hannah Lowe, Costa Book of the Year

== Music ==
- The Kid (musical), a 2010 musical based on the book by Dan Savage
- The Kids (Belgian band), a punk rock band
- The Kids (Norwegian band), a rock band
- The Kids (garage rock band), a 1960s band whose song "Nature's Children" is included on the compilation album Pebbles, Volume 10
- The Kids, a South Florida rock band that included Johnny Depp
- "The Kids", a song by B.o.B from B.o.B Presents: The Adventures of Bobby Ray
- "The Kid", a song by Eric Burdon from Survivor
- "The Kids", a song by Eminem from The Marshall Mathers LP
- "The Kids", a song by Hollywood Undead
- "The Kids", a song by Lou Reed from Berlin

== Nickname or ring name ==
- Frank Bourne (1854–1945), British soldier, last known survivor of the Battle of Rorke's Drift
- Billy the Kid (1859–1881), American Old West outlaw
- Ted Williams (1918–2002), Major League Baseball player
- Stu Ungar (1953–1998), professional poker and gin rummy player
- Gary Carter (1954–2012), Major League Baseball player
- Robin Yount (born 1955), Major League Baseball player
- Mark Ryan (guitarist) (1959–2011), English punk rock guitarist and playwright
- Carlos Valderrama (footballer) (born 1961), Colombian footballer
- Gary Jacobs (boxer) (born 1965), professional Scottish boxer
- Ken Griffey Jr. (born 1969), American retired Major League Baseball player
- Sean Waltman (born 1972), professional wrestler
- John Higgins (born 1975), professional snooker player
- Kevin Garnett (born 1976), National Basketball Association player
- Julian Gardner (poker player) (born 1978), professional poker player
- Yossi Benayoun (born 1980), Israeli footballer
- Kerby Raymundo (born 1981), Filipino professional basketball player
- Fernando Torres (born 1984), Spanish footballer
- Sidney Crosby (born 1987), National Hockey League player
- Joseph Marquez (born 1991), professional Super Smash Bros. Melee player

== Other uses ==
- The Kid (artist), Robin Kid (born 1991), French artist
- Haedi, or the Kids, a pair of stars in the constellation Auriga
- "The Kids" (The Amazing World of Gumball), a 2014 TV episode

== See also ==
- Kid (disambiguation)
- Kidd (disambiguation)
- Kydd (disambiguation)
