= Kidz =

Kidz may refer to:

- "Kidz" (song), a song by Take That
- KIDZ-LD, a low-power television station in Abilene, Texas, U.S.
- Kidz Magazine, a 1995-2007 magazine
- "Kidz", a song by Plan B from Who Needs Actions When You Got Words
- A defunct TV station in Wichita Falls, Texas

== See also ==
- Kid (disambiguation)
