= Kidd =

Kidd may refer to:

== Places ==
- Kidd (railway point), British Columbia, a former Canadian settlement
- Kidd's Beach, a coastal town in the Eastern Cape, South Africa
- Kidd Islands, Antarctic island grouping
- Mount Kidd, a peak in the Canadian Rockies
- Kidd Mine, the world's deepest base metal mine

== People ==
- Kidd (surname)
- Kidd (American rapper) (born 1996), American rapper
- Kidd (Danish rapper) (born 1989), Danish rapper
- Kidd Brewer (1908–1991), American football player and coach
- Kidd Jordan (1935–2023), American jazz saxophonist and music educator
- Kidd Kraddick (1959–2013), American radio host
- Kidd (born 2004), Greek rapper

== Other uses ==
- KSUR, a defunct radio station (630 AM) formerly licensed to serve Monterey, California, United States, which held the call sign KIDD from 1957 to 1987 and from 1991 to 2021
- Kidd antigen system
- Kidd class destroyer
- Kidd Hall, a student housing cooperative in Berkeley, California
- USS Kidd, the name of several U.S. Navy destroyers

== See also ==
- Kid (disambiguation)
- Kydd (disambiguation)
- The Kid (disambiguation)
