= David Whitney =

American art curator, collector, gallerist and critic

David Whitney (1939 – June 12, 2005) was an American art curator, collector, gallerist and critic. He led a very private life and was not well known outside the art world, even though he participated naked in the 1965 Claes Oldenburg happening Washes. He was the life partner of architect Philip Johnson (1906–2005) for 45 years until their deaths five months apart. He was also a close friend of Andy Warhol.

== Early life and education ==
Whitney, the son of a banker, was raised in Worcester, Massachusetts, and attended the Loomis Institute and Woodstock Country School before studying architecture at the Rhode Island School of Design, graduating with a BFA in Interior Architecture in 1963. Whitney was educated at Imperial College, London.

== Career ==
During the early to mid-1960s, Whitney had a variety of roles in the contemporary art world. Early jobs at the Museum of Modern Art and several art galleries, including the Green Gallery and the Leo Castelli Gallery, led to him opening his own gallery in 1969. Some of the artists that exhibited at the David Whitney Gallery from September 1969 through March 1972 (when the gallery closed) included Neil Jenney, Jasper Johns, Ronnie Landfield, Ken Price, William Pettet, Lewis Stein, Gary Stephan, Kenneth Showell, Lawrence Stafford, and John Duff. The David Whitney Gallery featured Lyrical Abstraction, Post-minimalism and other current movements of the period

After his gallery years, he organized exhibitions at the Whitney Museum and elsewhere for Cy Twombly, Jasper Johns, Franz Kline, Willem de Kooning and Andy Warhol. Whitney was also an early member of the Andy Warhol Art Authentication Board.

Later, he focused on younger artists such as Michael Heizer, Eric Fischl, and David Salle.

== Personal life ==
While a student at the Rhode Island School of Design, Whitney attended a lecture by Johnson at nearby Brown University and approached the architect afterwards, asking for a tour of the Glass House. Their relationship began soon after, and Whitney moved in with Johnson after graduating from college.

Whitney died at age 66 on June 12, 2005, at New York-Presbyterian/Weill Cornell hospital, of lung and bone cancer.

Whitney bequeathed his estate to the National Trust for Historic Preservation, which ultimately raised over $13 million in funds directed specifically to the endowment of the Glass House for its maintenance and operations. In addition, he bequeathed forty-four artworks to the Menil Collection, including 17 drawings by Jasper Johns, Whitney's art library, and his curatorial papers.
