= MiRA (real estate company) =

Mexican real estate development company

- Company type: Real estate investment and development
- Founded: 2007; 19 years ago
- Headquarters: Mexico City, Mexico
- Key people: Roberto Pulido (CEO) Carlos Asali (COO)
- Website: mira.mx

MiRA is a Mexican real estate investment and development company founded in 2007 and headquartered in Mexico City.

== History ==
MiRA was founded in 2007 by Mexican industrial engineer Javier Barrios. In 2014, the company partnered with Ivanhoé Cambridge to invest in mixed-use urban communities in Mexico. In 2016, MiRA sponsored MIRAPI 16, the first publicly listed CERPI in Mexico. In 2024, MiRA’s leadership completed a management buyout and acquired two urban infill sites in Mexico City.

== Projects ==
- Armani Residences Masaryk – Branded residential and retail development in Polanco, Mexico City.
- Neuchâtel Cuadrante Polanco – Mixed-use district in Mexico City including residential towers, retail, offices, and a public art installation (The Eye of Mexico).
- Cuadrante Centro Sur – Mixed-use district in Querétaro developed by MiRA.
- Puerto Cancún – Master-planned community in Cancún acquired by MiRA in 2012.
- Nuevo Sur – Mixed-use redevelopment in Monterrey with residential, hotel, and retail space.

== Recognition ==
At the GRI Awards Mexico 2023, Neuchâtel Cuadrante Polanco won Best Residential Project and The HUB @ Cuadrante Centro Sur won second place for Best Shopping Center Project. In 2016, Nuevo Sur received a Gold ICSC Latin America Award and two International Property Awards.
