= Phoebe the Flamingo (statue) =

Statue in Tampa, Florida

HOME
- Phoebe the Flamingo
- Artist: Matthew Mazzotta
- Year: 2022
- Medium: Polyester resin and Fiberglass
- Location: Tampa, Florida; 27.98004°N 82.53482°W
- Website: https://www.matthewmazzotta.com/home-tampa

Phoebe the Flamingo, officially named "HOME", and also colloquially known as the Tampa International Airport Flamingo, is a work of public art by American artist Matthew Mazzotta. It is located at the Main Terminal of Tampa International Airport in Tampa, Florida.

The statue received its name, "Phoebe," through an International naming contest with over 65,000 entries worldwide.

== Origins and installation ==
Installed in 2022, the sculpture stands 21 feet tall and is made from polyester resin and fiberglass. It depicts a hyperrealistic flamingo with its head and feet submerged as if wading through water. The design alludes to the debate over whether flamingos are native to Florida. Matthew Mazzotta's flamingo sculpture was selected from 734 art proposals submitted from around the world.

== Reception ==
The statue has received positive feedback from travelers, who describe it as "soothing" and a stress reliever. It has become an iconic part of the airport's interior, frequently appearing in travelers' photos. Kelly Figley of the TPA Public Art Program noted the positive reactions of visitors upon seeing the sculpture.

== Awards and accolades ==
In 2023, "Phoebe" won a CODA award in the Transportation category. The statue also received one of two "People's Choice Awards" honors, with more than 3,000 people voting for the piece.

== See also ==
2022 in art
