= Matthew Mazzotta =

American artist and lecturer (born 1977)

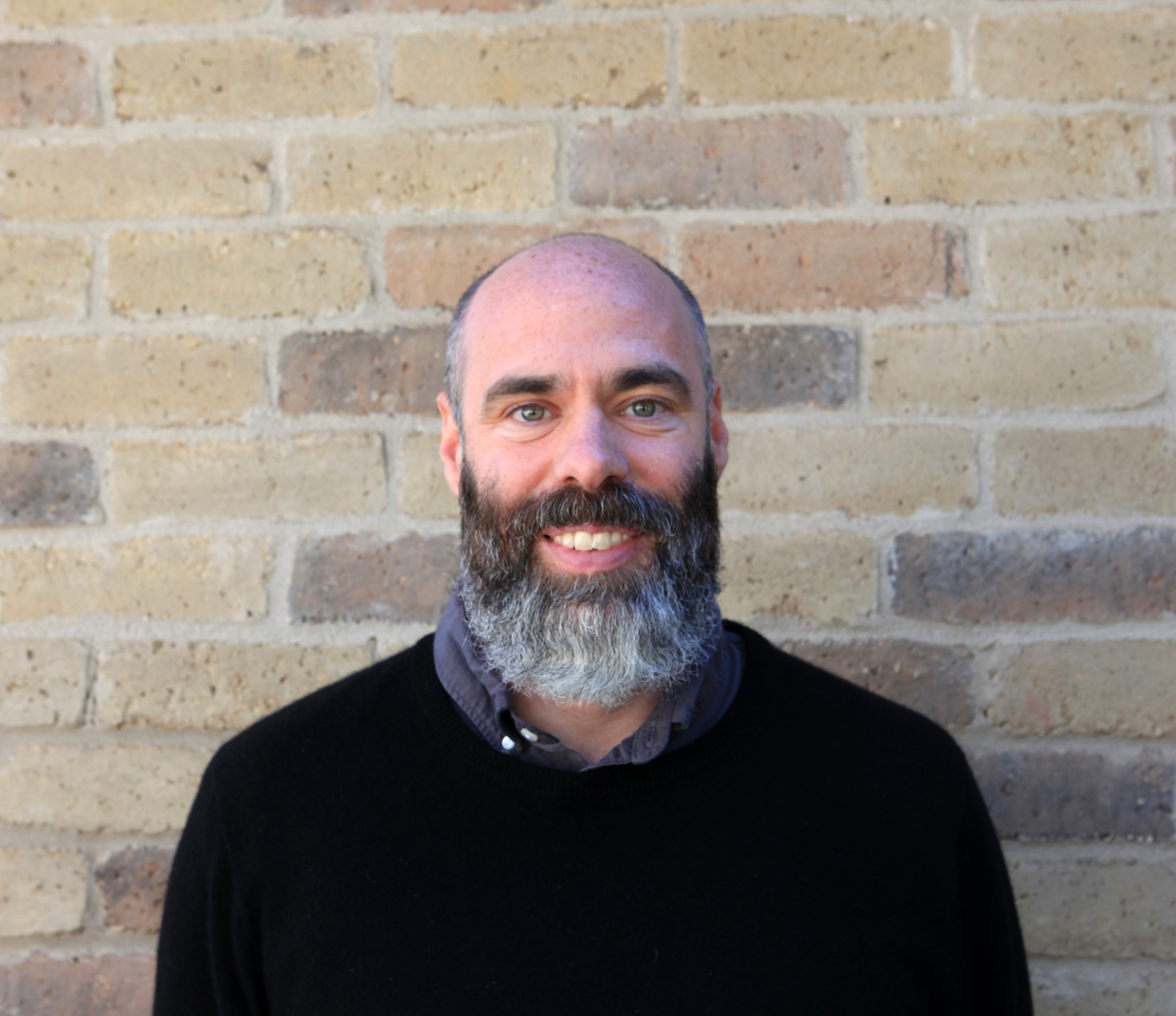
- Born: March 28, 1977 (age 49); Canton, New York, US
- Education: School of the Art Institute of Chicago; Massachusetts Institute of Technology
- Known for: Social Practice Art
- Awards: Dezeen Awards - “Architecture Project of the Year 2018”
- Website: www.matthewmazzotta.com

Matthew Mazzotta (born March 28, 1977) is an American social practice artist known for community engaged artworks in the public space. He describes public space as political, stating that public spaces like downtowns should not only have commercial establishments, but also include spaces where communities can come together.

He works to create public spaces that are built by the community and designed specifically for their needs, and address issues such as food deserts, community well-being, and the loss of cultural identity.

Mazzotta participated in the exhibition “PORCH: An Architecture of Generosity” at the U.S. Pavilion of the 19th Venice Biennale of Architecture in 2025.

== Life and Career ==
Mazzotta grew up in Canton, New York. He attended Oglethorpe University but dropped out after 1 year. During this time, he traveled around the United States in a van and took on jobs involving welding and fabrication. The artworks he made during this time off was what he used to apply to the School of the Art Institute of Chicago, where he received his BFA degree in 2001. Afterwards he took on carpentry work. He later completed a Master of Science in Visual Studies degree from the Massachusetts Institute of Technology's Program in Art, Culture, and Technology in 2009.

Growing up, Mazzotta spent summers in Bauline East, a small community south of St. John's on Newfoundland's Southern Shore. He credits his grandfather as an inspiration for his art-making process. His grandfather is a rural Newfoundland native, who when he needed a certain tool, would just make his own to meet his needs, such as a repair, to pick a certain fruit or to fix a motor.

Mazzotta describes skateboarding as an influence to his art practice. He likens the way he creates public art to the way he moves around the city as a skateboarder. Rather than show up to a place to install an already made artwork, he prefers generating an artwork idea through dialogue with local people. "I go into a community as an outsider, with my eyes, and just start to pick up things and talk to people," he said.

Mazzotta’s public art practice grew out of his early involvement with activism. In the 1990s, Mazzotta was affiliated with the hardcore punk scene in Atlanta, Georgia, where he protested for animal rights and environmental causes. For him, public art coincides with activism on the goal of awareness raising. “How do you get a person that doesn't care about something to walk into a conversation or into a dialogue? I use artistic sensibilities, or the privileges art gives us, in terms of capturing someone's attention,” he says. One method he employs to raise awareness is through the creation of spectacles in public space. For him, a spectacle unites people, allowing people who may have opposing viewpoints to share the same space and experience.

He was a recipient of a 2017-18 Loeb Fellowship at Harvard Graduate School of Design and was a 2019-20 Guggenheim Fellow.

== Work ==
=== Outdoor Living Room (Ongoing) ===
The Outdoor Living Room is a community-engagement method developed by Matthew Mazzotta as an early phase of several of his public art commissions. The Outdoor Living Room is assembled in public spaces with couches, tables, chairs, rugs and lamps, as a way to invite conversation with the community for which the public artwork is designated. Mazzotta uses this method to welcome the voices and ideas of people who may not attend more formal meetings.

Mazzotta employed this method while developing his STOREFRONT THEATER project in Lyons, Nebraska. During these sessions, a Lyons resident revealed that an abandoned storefront on the town's Main Street was in fact only a freestanding façade, which inspired the STOREFRONT THEATER concept. Residents also identified a lack of activities for the town's children, which shaped the project's eventual multi-generational use. Mazzotta emphasizes that a project's success hinges on how the community will eventually adopt and use the public artwork after it is installed.

For his commission in York, Alabama, Mazzotta similarly asked local residents to bring something from their living rooms to stage an Outdoor Living Room in the middle of Avenue A. Through this discussion they identified the lack of public space in York and the abundance of abandoned buildings as pressing issues, which led to the creation of his OPEN HOUSE project.

Mazzotta has staged Outdoor Living Room sessions in several other towns and cities, including Wheaton, Maryland in May, 2015; Athens, Georgia in December, 2015 as part of the city’s development of a Public Art Master Plan led by Todd Bressi; Boise, Idaho in January, 2020 as a precursor to his project GENTLE BREEZE; Sacramento, California for his 2024 sculpture UPLIFTING EXPERIENCE; Salt Lake City, Utah in April, 2025 as part of his commission for a public artwork at Glendale Park; and Lincoln, Nebraska in September, 2025 for his commission at South Haymarket Park.

=== BUSYCLE (2005) ===
The BUSYCLE was a human-powered vehicle built in 2005 by Matthew Mazzotta and fellow artist Heather Clark, designed to carry 14 passengers who collectively pedal it forward. Mazzotta and Clark are long-time friends who had both grown up in Canton, New York. The vehicle consists of 14 sets of bicycle pedals connected through a shared gearing system to a single driver's seat, who is responsible for steering and braking. The BUSYCLE touched on Mazzotta and Clark's interest in sustainable transportation. It was constructed largely from recycled and donated materials, including van flatbed sections, exercise equipment, and bed frames.

The project drew informal advice from engineers in the Netherlands and South Africa, a mechanic from Australia, a bicycle sculptor from Baltimore, as well as consultation from MIT mechanical engineering professor David Gordon Wilson. The project began in May 2005 through an Artist-in-Residence program at the Berwick Research Institute, a Boston-based artist-run organization. It was constructed at the Sparqs Industrial Arts Club in Woburn, Massachusetts, with help from a volunteer team of diverse backgrounds, including a pastry chef, a French horn player, a videographer, a physics teacher, an architect, and an engineer.

The BUSYCLE made a public appearance in Boston’s parade on September 25, 2005, as part of the city’s four-month-long celebration of its 375th birthday. After its Boston debut, the BUSYCLE traveled to different cities on a cross-country story-collecting tour ending in San Francisco. During stops, the crew invited locals to climb aboard and pedal together. Afterwards, participants were invited to record their stories, which were videotaped and shared with people at the next stop.

=== STEEPED IN EXPLORATION (2010) ===
STEEPED IN EXPLORATION was a public art installation in Drachten, Netherlands that utilizes a methane digester. Mazzotta developed it as a proof of concept for his Park Spark Project, installed later in the same year. The structure consists of six curved segments that join together to form a large, seed pod-like structure about 8 feet tall. The segments are covered in reeds used to roof local houses, and they can unfold to become 6 separate seating benches, with a methane-powered heater and kettle at the center with which visitors can make tea.

As part of the activation of the artwork, Mazzotta organized an outing with local residents to forage tea ingredients in the surrounding area, drawing upon the participants’ knowledge of local plants.

=== The Park Spark Project (2010) ===
The Park Spark Project was a public art installation that converted dog waste into methane gas used to fuel an old fashioned streetlamp. It was installed in September 2010 at a dog park on Pacific Street in the Cambridgeport neighborhood of Cambridge, Massachusetts, and was originally displayed for about a month, through September 25. Mazzotta, then a 33-year-old artist holding a master's degree in visual studies from MIT, conceived the project after seeing household methane digesters used for cooking during a trip to India.

The project drew on consultation with environmental scientist Will Brinton, who had previously advised on a similar proposed dog-waste-to-energy project in San Francisco that was never built. Mazzotta developed the first prototype in Maine with the help of Brinton, which was a metal drum with a lamp attached via a gas valve. Bringing the project to fruition required roughly seven months of navigating municipal bureaucracy: Cambridge Parks and Recreation initially rejected the proposal, and Mazzotta separately had to secure approval from the Environmental Protection Agency, the fire department, the city's Open Space Committee, and building permitting. Before Park Spark was realized in Cambridge, Mazzotta developed STEEPED IN EXPLORATION in Drachten, Netherlands as a proof of concept. This version utilized a methane digester to heat up a kettle with which visitors can make tea. The City of Cambridge ultimately approved Park Spark only as a temporary installation.

The installation consisted of an airtight underground digester tank into which dog owners deposited waste collected in biodegradable bags. Visitors turned a hand crank or wheel to stir the tank's contents, and anaerobic bacteria broke the waste down through microbial decomposition, producing methane gas. The gas runs through a pipe below the outlet tank into a converted gas lamp fixture, provided by the City of Boston, where it was burned to produce a continuous flame that lit the park. Mazzotta seeded the digester with a mixture of cow manure and unchlorinated water from the Charles River to help cultivate the methane-producing bacteria needed to process the dog waste.

During the project’s installment, it received high interaction as visitors enjoyed turning the crank mechanism. It also attracted national press attention and was featured on Wired Magazine, Discovery Channel News, and Huffington Post. It was mentioned on Season 7, Episode 110 of The Colbert Report aired on August 18, 2011. Mazzotta described the work as "an interactive urban intervention" intended to prompt reflection on waste and resources.

=== OPEN HOUSE (2013) ===
OPEN HOUSE was a 2013 public art installation and transformable sculpture located at 202 Main Street in York, Alabama, between the town's post office and its main grocery store. The idea for OPEN HOUSE came out of Mazzotta’s Outdoor Living Room conversation with local residents, which identified the lack of public space in York and the abundance of abandoned buildings as longstanding issues.

OPEN HOUSE was created in collaboration with the Coleman Center for the Arts, local York residents, and a project team that included Curtis Oliveira, Jegan Vincent De Paul, and Cory Vineyard. In consultation with local residents, the project team selected one of York’s most iconic abandoned properties—a house with pink siding—to serve as the site for the installation. Residents took part in hand-demolishing the original structure before construction began, and the town's fire department separately conducted a controlled burn of the remaining debris. The project was then built on the footprint of the original house, completed roughly seven months after it began, and was formally inaugurated on June 15, 2013 by York Mayor Gena Robbins.

In its closed state, the sculpture resembles a gable roof house, reusing the original building's pink exterior siding along with salvaged timber boards and window frames.Its foundation was built from reclaimed railroad ties, and it incorporates custom-fabricated industrial hinges that allow the structure to physically unfold into an open-air theater with five rows of stadium seating, accommodating approximately 100 people facing an open performance area.

The transformation is a manual process requiring teamwork: the structure's walls and roof sections hinge open along ground-level and mid-roof seams and are lowered in stages using a hand winch and manual counterbalancing. Mazzotta described the difficulty of this process as intentional, stating "the metamorphosis of OPEN HOUSE is designed to require cooperation." When not in use for events, the land around the structure functions as a public garden space.

The project was funded with grants from the National Endowment for the Arts, the Andy Warhol Foundation for the Visual Arts, the Visual Artists Network, York Drug, the City of York, the City of York Fire Department, and individual supporters of the Coleman Center for the Arts.

The Center for Sustainable Practice in the Arts, an independent nonprofit organization, described the artist's stated goal as being to "directly address the lack of public space in York, AL by providing a physical location that becomes a common ground for community dialogue and activities." Mazzotta has also framed the project's broader intent in terms of civic imagination, stating that "people that sit together can dream together and have a moment to collectively see their town from a new perspective," and that "if people are willing to dream and work, then anything that holds a community back can be seen as something that can potentially bring it forward."

In 2014, the project won the AZ Award, given by the Canadian design magazine Azure, in its "Temporary and Experiential Installations" category. Awards juror Ron Arad remarked, "There is a lot of joy in this project, it's a crazy idea that has actually been realized, and that in itself is delightful."

OPEN HOUSE has also received the 2014 Architizer A+ Jury Choice Award in the category of Architecture and Urban Transformation, the 2014 Year in Review Award by Americans for the Arts, and the 16th Annual Great Places Award by the Environmental Design Research Association.

=== RURAL LEGENDS (2016) ===
RURAL LEGENDS is a public art project in Decatur, Nebraska, built around a local legend involving a streetcar that never actually existed. The project's origin traces back to vintage postcards, circa 1910, distributed by Decatur businesses depicting a streetcar running through town, which was later revealed to be doctored imagery created as a marketing device to attract customers and settlers on the hope that rail development, which never materialized, was imminent. Jane Judt, president of the Decatur Museum board, explained: "They wanted a railroad for years, and the whole town was built on the assumption that they would have a railroad."

Mazzotta's project turned that century-old hoax into a physical landmark: he purchased an decommissioned emerald-green trolley car from New York City through eBay for $5,000 and drove the trolley to Nebraska over a four-day journey. While in Decatur, Mazzotta let the local residents ride the trolley through town, enacting the myth of Decatur having a streetcar. The vehicle’s engine was then removed so it could be installed as a stationary centerpiece, with tables and benches inside so it could be used for small gatherings. The trolley was installed in what became known as Trolley Park on Broadway in Decatur.

The idea to use a real streetcar came directly from Decatur residents during community planning sessions. Dozens of local volunteers contributed labor to the build, including hauling gravel and laying sections of railroad track. The project was funded through a $10,000 grant awarded to the Decatur Museum from the Byway of Art initiative, which covered both the trolley purchase and other park expenses. The resulting park opened with its first public event—a community ghost-story night—in November 2015.

Trolley Park has since hosted author talks, musical performances, community movie screenings, holiday caroling, and other small gatherings. Reporting a decade after the trolley's installation, KMTV 3 News Now described the park as continuing to serve as a venue connecting residents to local history and preserving oral tradition; Marilyn Andersen, vice president of the Decatur Museum, said of the town's stories, "These stories won't get written down. We have to keep telling them orally."

RURAL LEGENDS was one of four public art projects created as part of the Byway of Art initiative, an effort led by the Center for Rural Affairs and funded by a $200,000 grant from ArtPlace America, aimed at fostering community identity in the small Nebraska towns of Lyons, Decatur, and Oakland.

=== Cloud House ===
Cloud House (2016) is an art installation consisting of a house-like structure built from recycled wood and tin. Inside, it contains two rocking chairs, while a large cloud shaped sculpture is suspended over roof of the structure. When visitors sit in the rocking chairs, they activate the cloud and water falls from the cloud onto the tin roof, creating the soothing sounds of rain on a tin roof.

=== Storefront Theater ===
The Storefront Theater (2016) is an art installation and community center in Lyons, Nebraska. It re-conceptualizes the facade of an abandoned building to fold down into a theater that seats 80, transforming the town's main street into an outdoor theater. Before Mazzotta acquired the property, it was an empty lot with a street fronting facade.

=== HOME ===
HOME (known as Phoebe the Flamingo) (2022) is a public work of art located at the Central Terminal of Tampa International Airport. It depicts a hyperrealistic flamingo with its head and feet submerged, as if wading through water. The exaggerated scale of the flamingo in HOME puts the "lives of these birds in the focus, and puts us, as humans, in awe as they tower above us, reminding us that we all share the same home."

=== VOTE! (2024) ===
Near the midterm elections in the USA,VOTE! was featured on the front page of the New York Times on the October 24th, 2026 print issue.

=== RISING TOGETHER (2025) ===
RISING TOGETHER is a large, barn-like public artwork and community gathering space, sited on the campus of the National Western Center in Denver, Colorado. Functionally, the artwork is a programmable space intended to host poetry readings, classes, music, dancing, and other community-desired activities. The painted mural on the roof of the structure, titled Sacred Threads, is a collaboration with Denver muralist Bimmer Torres.

The dedication day, June 14, 2025, opened with a blessing of the artworks by Grupo Tlaloc Danza Azteca, including a traditional Aztec dance performance, and closed with a live performance by Los Mocochetes in the barn structure. The piece’s slanted steel beams evokes the barn raising, a community event in which people contribute their strength for a common goal. Rudi Cerri, Public Art Program Manager for Denver Arts and Venues, describes the artwork as “a beautiful new space where community comes together.” RISING TOGETHER is part of a broader expansion of Denver's public art collection tied to the National Western Center's redevelopment.

=== RISE (2025) ===
RISE is a monumental, kinetic sculpture of a jellyfish at San Diego International Airport Terminal 1 arrivals area. It is constructed from painted stainless steel and an architectural mesh material called Kaynemaile, originally developed by Kayne Horsham, the armor, weapons, and creatures art director for the Lord of the Rings film trilogy.

The sculpture's canopy is composed of thousands of interconnected rings that shimmer and sway in the wind, evoking the movement of marine life underwater. It is modeled after the purple-striped jellyfish (Chrysaora colorata), an aquatic species often found off the coast of San Diego.

Mazzotta picked the jellyfish after consulting with researchers at the Scripps Institution of Oceanography about the region's marine biology. He selected the sculpture’s colors to match the hues of a San Diego coastal sunset, rather than the jellyfish's natural tones.

Mazzotta describes the title, “RISE,” as a reminder that coastal communities need to be “keeping eyes on climate change and sea levels.” The sculpture hints at the future impact of climate change on a coastal airport. He says “We have to keep our eye on climate change, sustainability and sea level rise,” otherwise “one day a jellyfish could be in the same location.”

RISE was commissioned as part of a broader $10 million public art program for San Diego International Airport Terminal 1.

== Awards ==
2024

- International Sculpture Center Innovator Award, Honorable Mention

2023

- CodaWORX Award, People’s Choice Award

2020

- NYSCA/NYFA Artist Fellowship: Craft/Sculpture

2018

- "Architecture Project of the year" - Dezeen Awards at Tate Modern
- Architizer A+ Award in the category of "Architecture + Community"
- Harpo Foundation Grant for Visual Artists

2017

- World Architecture News WAN Awards in the category of Adaptive Reuse
- American Architecture Award in the category Museums and Cultural Buildings
- Congress for the New Urbanism – Charter Award
- World Architecture Community – 20+10+X Award
- CODA Awards Merit Award for Public Space – Cloud House
