= Sandy Brown (ceramist) =

British ceramics artist (born 1946)

- Born: 1946 (age 78–79); Tichborne, Hampshire, England
- Website: www.sandybrownarts.com

External audio
- “Artist and Ceramicist Sandy Brown on the Power of Making with an Empty Mind”, The Practical Creative, October 9, 2019

Sandy Brown (born 1946) is a British ceramics artist who is nationally and internationally known for her works, which range from smaller ceramics to huge public sculptures. Brown is a Fellow of the Craft Potters Association.

== Biography ==
Sandy Brown was born in Tichborne in 1946. Brown travelled to Iran in her youth and was greatly affected by the Jameh Mosque of Isfahan with its distinctive colourful mosaic tiles and polychromic dome. Brown trained in Japan at the Daisei Pottery in Mashiko for four years. In 1988 Brown was appointed by the British Council as an artist in residence in Australia.

Her piece Temple was created for the 2015 Sotheby's exhibition of monumental sculpture, Beyond Limits, at Chatsworth House in Derbyshire. Temple was made by hand and was acclaimed by Construction News as the "largest single piece ceramic sculpture within a 12-month timeframe". Temple is made from 3,017 handmade wall and floor tiles and 2,183 roof tiles. In June 2022 her work Earth Goddess became the tallest ceramic artwork ever erected in the United Kingdom. Brown described her motivation for creating Earth Goddess as wanting the " ... sculpture to make an impact and I wanted her to be female and making an impact". Earth Goddess stands in a square in the Cornish town of St Austell.

In addition to shows solo Arts-Council funded touring shows in the UK, Brown has had shows in Australia, Germany, Holland, Japan, South Africa and the USA. Brown's work is included in the collections of the Federation University Australia art collection, the Victoria and Albert Museum and the Winnipeg Art Gallery. Brown's work is also in the collections of the Museum Angewandte Kunst in Frankfurt, Germany and the Icheon World Ceramics Centre in South Korea.

Brown delivered the Shipley Art Gallery's Henry Rothschild Memorial Lecture in 2020.

Brown was interviewed by Tom Morris for his book New Wave Clay.

Brown's studio and gallery is situated in Appledore in North Devon, in a former glove factory. Brown established her eponymous museum in Appledore in 2014. Her museum displays her large scale pieces.

Brown is noted for her strong use of colour in clay, frequently painting her pieces with spontaneous brushworks. The editor of Keramik magazine, Gabi Dewald, has said that Brown's "catalytic" and "liberating" influence on European ceramics in the 1970s and 1980s cannot be "underestimated".

== Awards ==
- Fellow, Craft Potters Association
