= Tampa International Airport =

Airport serving Tampa Bay, Florida, United States

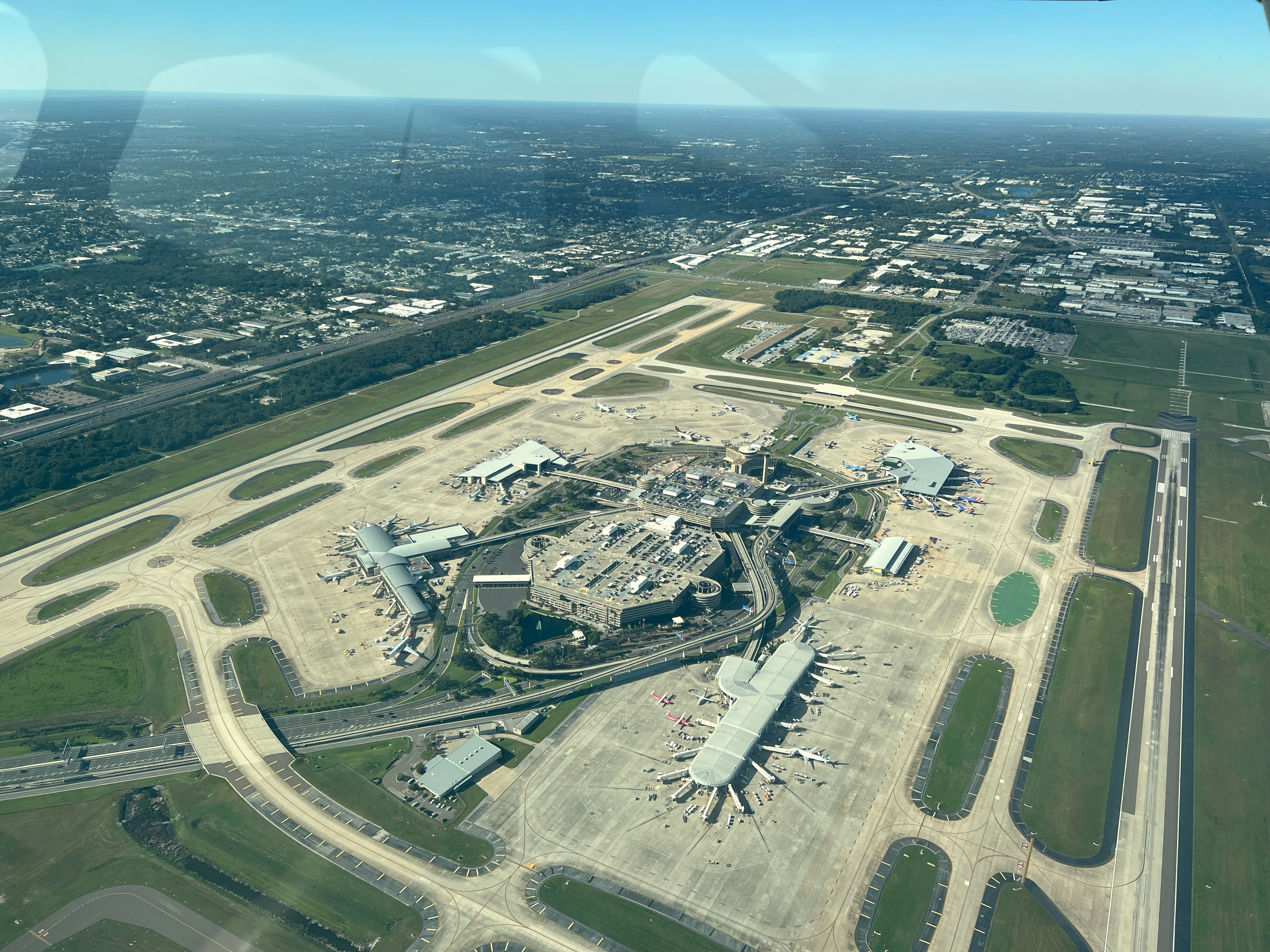
- Aerial photo of Tampa International Airport taken October 19, 2022
- IATA: TPA; ICAO: KTPA; FAA LID: TPA; WMO: 72211

Summary
- Airport type: Public
- Owner/Operator: Hillsborough County Aviation Authority
- Serves: Tampa Bay area
- Location: Tampa, Florida, U.S.
- Opened: February 22, 1928; 98 years ago
- Operating base for: Breeze Airways; Frontier Airlines
- Elevation AMSL: 26 ft (7.9 m)
- Coordinates: 27°58′47″N 82°32′5″W
- Website: tampaairport.com

Maps
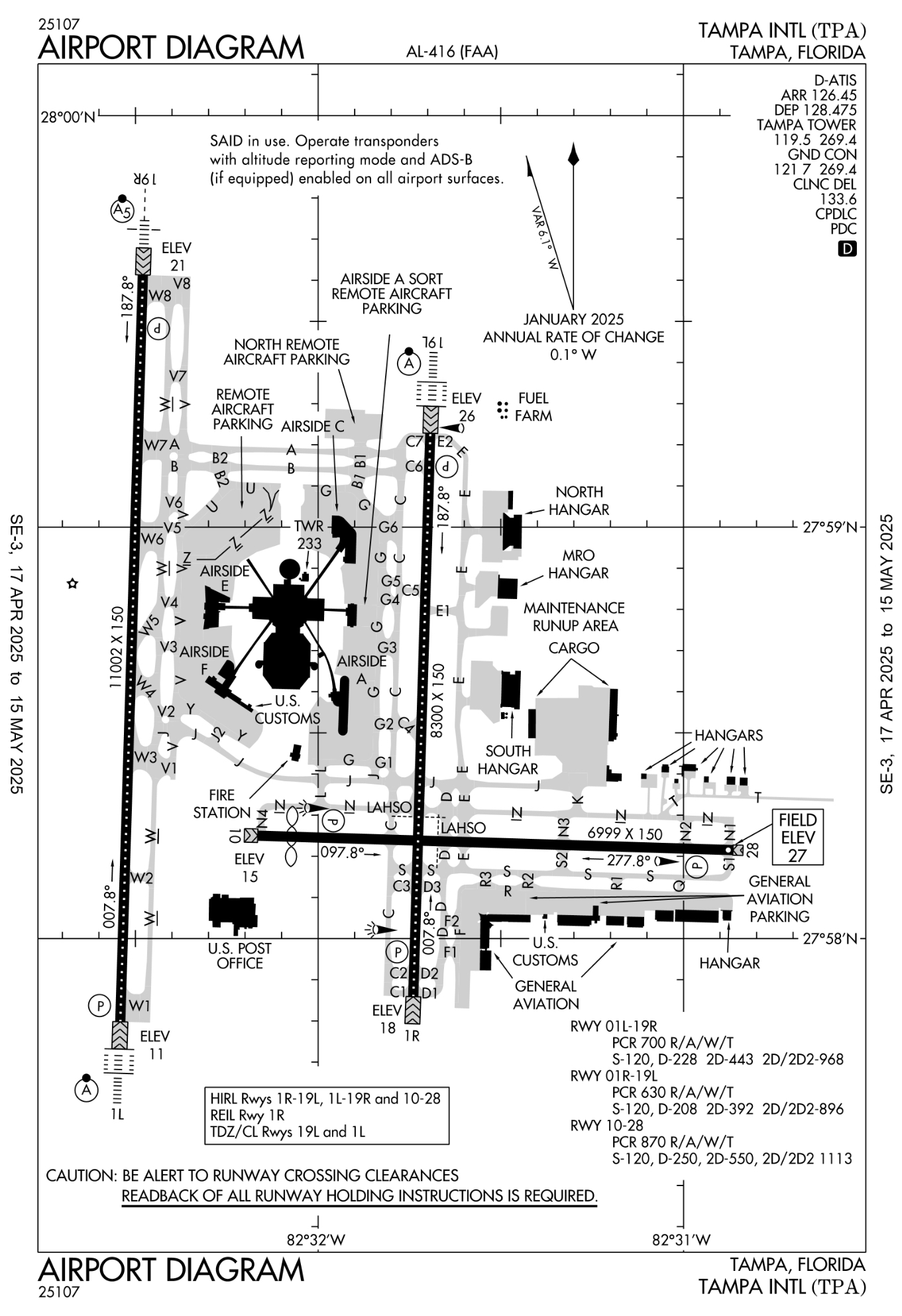
- FAA airport diagram
- Interactive map of Tampa International Airport

Runways
Direction	Length		Surface
Direction	ft	m	Surface
10/28	6,999	2,133	Concrete
19L/1R	8,300	2,530	Asphalt/concrete
19R/1L	11,002	3,353	Asphalt/concrete

Helipads
Number	Length		Surface
Number	ft	m	Surface
H1	100	30	Asphalt

Statistics (2025)
- Total passengers: 24,811,253 ▲0.22%
- Aircraft operations: 226,398
- Total cargo and mail (lbs.): 239,856,759
- Source: Federal Aviation Administration

Tampa International Airport (IATA: TPA, ICAO: KTPA, FAA LID: TPA) is an international airport six miles (9.7 km) west of Downtown Tampa, in Hillsborough County, Florida, United States. The airport is publicly owned by Hillsborough County Aviation Authority (HCAA). The airport serves 100 non-stop destinations throughout North America, South America, the Caribbean and Europe across multiple carriers.

== History ==
=== Birthplace of commercial air service ===
Tampa Bay is the birthplace of commercial airline service, when pioneer aviator Tony Jannus flew the inaugural flight of the St. Petersburg–Tampa Airboat Line on January 1, 1914, from St. Petersburg to Tampa using a Benoist Flying Boat—the first scheduled commercial airline flight in the world using a heavier-than-air airplane.

=== Drew Field ===
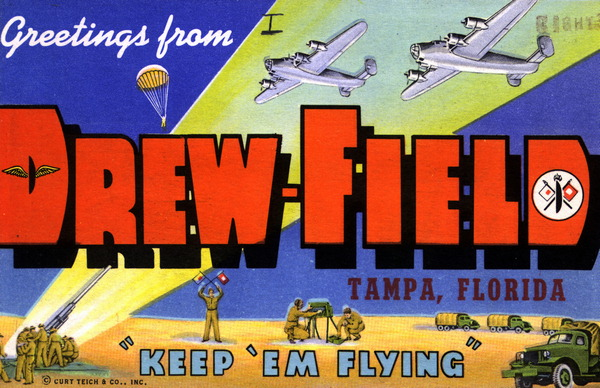
World War II postcard from Drew Army Airfield

In 1928, the city completed the 160-acre (65 ha) Drew Field six miles (9.7 km) west of Downtown Tampa. It was named for local developer John H. Drew, who formerly owned the land on which the airport stood. The more popular Peter O. Knight Airport was opened on Davis Islands near Downtown Tampa in 1935, where both Eastern and National Airlines operated until 1946.

The United States Army Air Corps began negotiating for the use of Drew Field in 1939 during the buildup of military forces prior to World War II. In 1940, the City of Tampa leased Drew Field to the U.S. Government for 25 years, or until the end of the "national emergency". During the war, the United States Army Air Forces expanded and modernized the airport. The airfield was used by the Third Air Force and renamed it Drew Army Airfield. The Third Air Force used it as a training center by 120,000 combat air crews, primarily in bomber aircraft for the European and Pacific theaters, and also flew locally based antisubmarine patrols from the airfield until that mission was fully taken over by Naval Aviation assets of the U.S. Navy and U.S. Coast Guard. There was one mishap in 1943 that killed five fliers. Despite this, Drew Field set a safety record for the Third Air Force in 1945 after 100,000 flying hours had been completed over a period of 10 months without a fatal incident. The aircraft operated included the Boeing B-17 Flying Fortress, Douglas C-47 Skytrain, North American AT-6, North American B-25 Mitchell, and others.

After World War II, the Army Air Forces vacated the facility and Drew Field was returned to the City of Tampa. The Peter O. Knight Airport and Drew Field reversed roles as the main Tampa airport because Drew Field was greatly expanded by the United States Army Air Forces during the war years. Airlines (Eastern Air Lines and National Airlines) moved to Drew Field from Peter O. Knight Airport on Davis Island, which was too small to handle the Douglas DC-4, DC-6 and Lockheed Constellation prop-liners then coming on line in the mid-1940s. During this period, the airlines were housed in the former Drew AAF Base Operations building.

=== Tampa International Airport ===
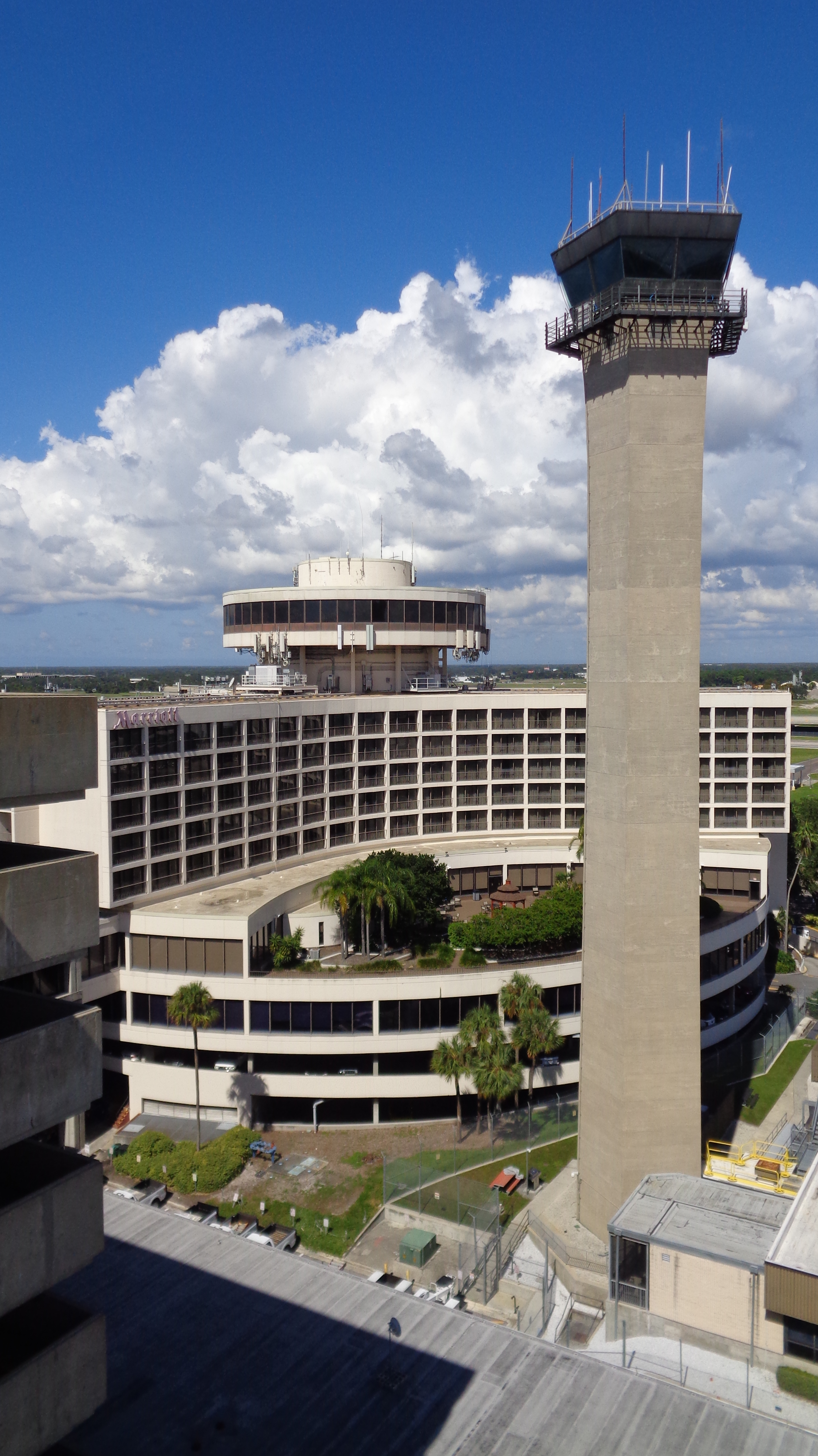
Tampa Airport Marriott and air traffic control tower

Trans Canada Airlines international flights began in 1950 and Drew Field was renamed Tampa International Airport. The airport's second terminal opened in 1952 near the intersection of Columbus Drive and West Shore Blvd. The April 1957 Official Airline Guide shows 30 departures a day on Eastern Air Lines: nonstops to Chicago-Midway, Detroit (Willow Run), Cleveland, New York Idlewild (now JFK), Boston, seven nonstops to Atlanta and 18 within Florida. National Airlines had 26 departures, including seven nonstops beyond Florida to Houston Hobby, Havana, Washington National, New York/Idlewild and three to New Orleans. Trans-Eastern had 12 departures and Mackey had two DC-3s, none nonstop beyond Florida. Trans-Canada had 13 nonstops a week to Toronto or Montreal.

The 1952 terminal, built for three airlines, was swamped after the Civil Aeronautics Board granted Capital, Delta, Northeast, Northwest and Trans World Airlines authority to fly from Tampa in the late 1950s. An annex was built east of the terminal for the new carriers. Turbine-powered flights began in 1959 on Eastern Air Lines' L-188 Electra; in 1960 National, Eastern and Delta Air Lines began jet flights with the Douglas DC-8 (Delta was first, with a Chicago nonstop in May or June). National DC-8 nonstops to Los Angeles and weekly Pan American jets to Mexico City (MIA-TPA-MID-MEX) started in 1961. The 1952 terminal was congested as larger jets replaced piston airliners and it was again expanded.

During the early 1960s, the aviation authority began planning a replacement terminal in an undeveloped site at the airport. Airport leaders chose the Landside/Airside design in 1965 after a study. Construction on the new terminal designed by Reynolds, Smith & Hills began in 1968 between the airport's parallel jet-capable runways. Days before its opening, the terminal was dedicated by Florida Governor Reubin Askew and 60,000 people toured the new facility during a two-day open house. The terminal opened for passenger traffic on April 15, 1971 with four airside satellites (Airsides B, C, D, and E). National Airlines Flight 36 from Los Angeles was the first to arrive at the terminal; after touching down at 05:26 A.M., the jet taxied to Airside E.

The graphics and signage system designed by Jane Davis Doggett used red for one group of airlines and blue for another. The red/blue color scheme began on the highway outside the airport and helped guide drivers to the proper dropoff areas for each airline, then continued to guide passengers through the airport itself and ultimately to their gate. The Tampa Airport was the first airport to use this sort of color-coded wayfinding signage system which was safer for drivers and required many fewer signs than highway engineers had originally budgeted for.

The logo, used since the new airport opened in 1971, represents the blue waters of Tampa Bay with a jetliner flying into the downtown Tampa sunset. It is known as the "Spirit of Flight". The jetliner was modeled after those once used for supersonic transport—at the time the logo was created in the 1970s, it was during an era when it was thought that supersonic aircraft would replace conventional jets as a mode of air travel.

In its early years, the 1971 terminal would also see large amounts of tourists heading to Walt Disney World, which also opened in 1971. This was due to the fact that Orlando International Airport (known then as Orlando Jetport at McCoy) was much smaller at the time with a more limited capacity. Shawnee Airlines offered connecting flights from Tampa to the now-defunct Walt Disney World Airport in the 1970s. Orlando International opened its current terminal in 1981 using the same well-received landside/airside layout as Tampa International Airport.

On July 15, 1972, the 207-foot-tall (63 m) air traffic control tower opened, the tallest in the United States at the time. The Host/Marriott Airport Hotel and its revolving rooftop restaurant opened in December 1973, with triple-paned windows and sound-proof guest rooms.

Northwest Airlines and National Airlines brought the jumbo jet to the airport late in 1971 with the introduction of the Boeing 747 and McDonnell Douglas DC-10. This was followed by the L-1011 Lockheed Tristar a year later by Eastern Air Lines. National Airlines began trans Atlantic DC-10 service to Amsterdam and Paris in 1977.

=== Recent history ===
During the following decades, the airport was expanded to handle more traffic and additional airlines. In 1987, the terminal received its first major expansion with the opening of Airside F. Airside B closed permanently in 1991 following the demise of Eastern Air Lines. Airside A was subsequently built and opened in 1995. In 1996, Airsides C and D were temporarily closed and remodeled, and the interiors of both satellites were refurbished. During this time, all the airlines from both facilities were housed in Airside E. Upon completion of the renovations, the airlines returned to their original locations, and Airside E was permanently closed. Airside E sat dormant for a few years before eventually being demolished, with the current Airside E opening in 2002. The Landside Terminal was also remodeled multiple times during the 1980s and 1990s. Airside C and the abandoned Airside B were demolished in the mid-2000s, with the current Airside C opening in 2005. Airside D, the last original airside, was then closed permanently and was demolished in 2007. A new Airside D is currently under construction and is set to open in 2028.

Both Delta Air Lines and US Airways opened maintenance bases at the airport. Both bases closed during the air travel downturn following the attacks of September 11, 2001. Alabama-based Pemco World Air Services now occupies the former US Airways hangar performing MRO (maintenance, repair, overhaul) services for the Spirit Airlines and JetBlue A320 fleet. On April 1, 2010 a press release announced that a lease agreement was reached to allow Pemco to lease the second hangar formerly used by Delta Air Lines, where they perform Boeing 737 cargo conversions and modifications.

Phase I of the economy parking garage was completed in November 2005. Phase II of the economy garage opened ahead of schedule in November 2005, bringing a total of 5,600 parking spaces.

On March 7, 2011, federal officials gave TPA the green light to begin charter flights to Cuba as an official entry/exit point.

In 2007 and 2008, Zagat Survey ranked TPA the Best Overall U.S. Airport, while placing it second-best overall in 2009 and 2010. In 2008 Condé Nast Traveler recognized TPA as the second-best airport in the world, just two tenths of a point behind the first-place winner. JD Power and Associates have also given TPA Airport consistently high customer-satisfaction ratings over the years. In November 2011, CNN ranked TPA sixth among ten of the world's most loved airports, being the only one on the list from the US. In 2016, it was named one of the Top 3 airports in the country by Condé Nast. In 2020 Airports Council International named TPA the best airport in North America for its size. In 2024, Travel+Leisure ranked TPA the eighth best domestic airport in the US. Criteria for the rankings were based on access, check-in, restaurants, shopping, and design, and rated from excellent to poor. Readers of the magazine were involved in the survey. Palm Beach International Airport, another Florida airport, made the list (#3) as well.

In August 2022, a 21-foot flamingo sculpture named HOME and nicknamed "Phoebe" was installed and opened in the main terminal. The design, from American artist Matthew Mazzotta, was chosen out of 734 art proposals submitted from around the world.

In February 2024, Joe Lopano, the CEO credited with leading Tampa's improvement as a hub, announced plans to retire. At the same time, the airport's board announced it would be undergoing an internal search for a replacement.

Currently, plans are underway to construct a new Airside D in the northwest area of TPA. This new airside will feature 16 gates to handle both international and domestic flights, as well as two new airline lounges, one of which will be operated by Delta Air Lines, the anchor tenant of Airside D. It will help TPA serve up to 35 million annual passengers by 2037. Groundbreaking of the airside occurred in December 2024, with the airside scheduled to open to the public in 2028.

In July 2026, Tampa International was among the first airports to announce plans to join the TSA Gold+ program, which would authorize the Transportation Security Administration to hand over responsibility for airport security screening to private companies. The program would expand upon the Screening Partnership Program, a preexisting program that has already allowed certain airports to privatize security screening.

== Facilities ==
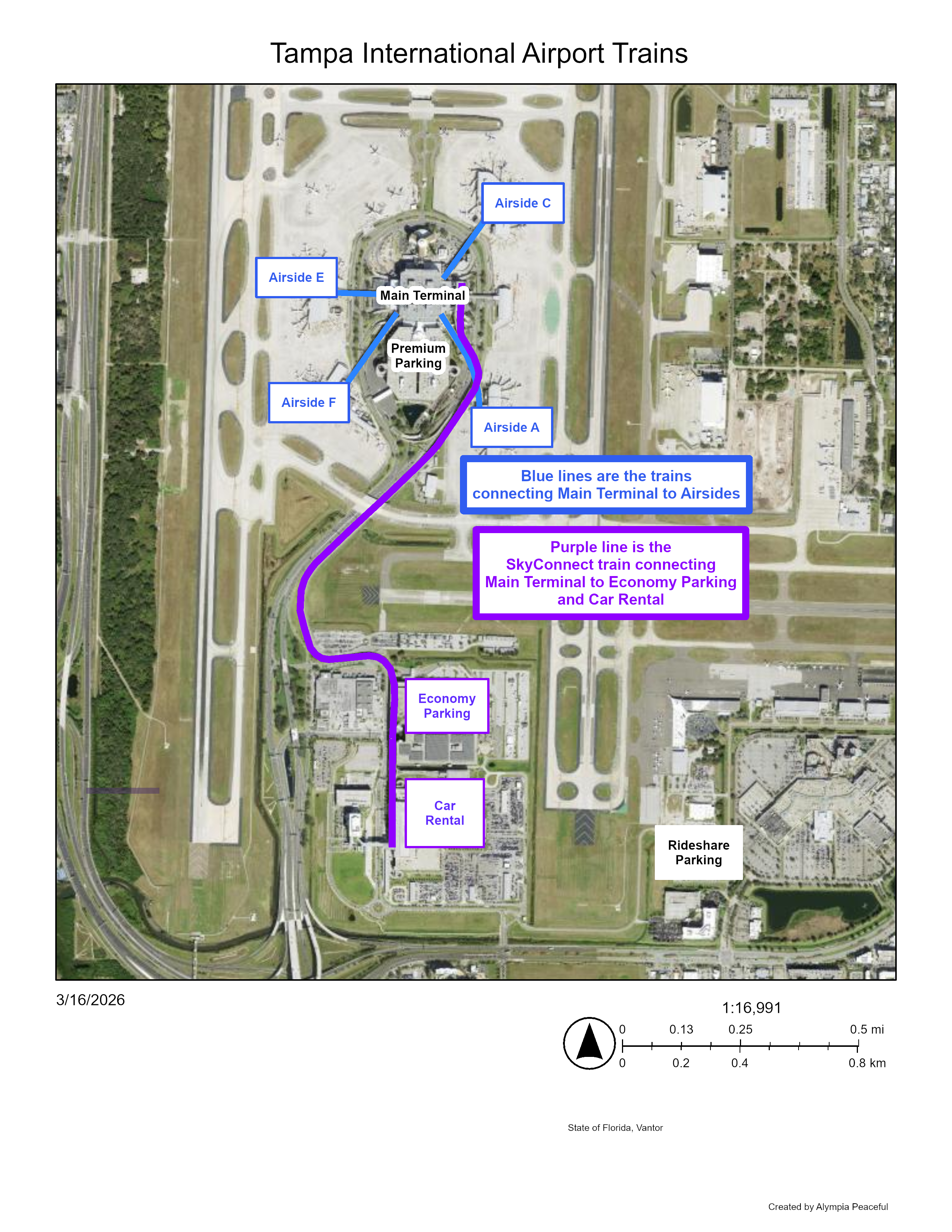
Tampa International Airport train lines

=== Terminal ===
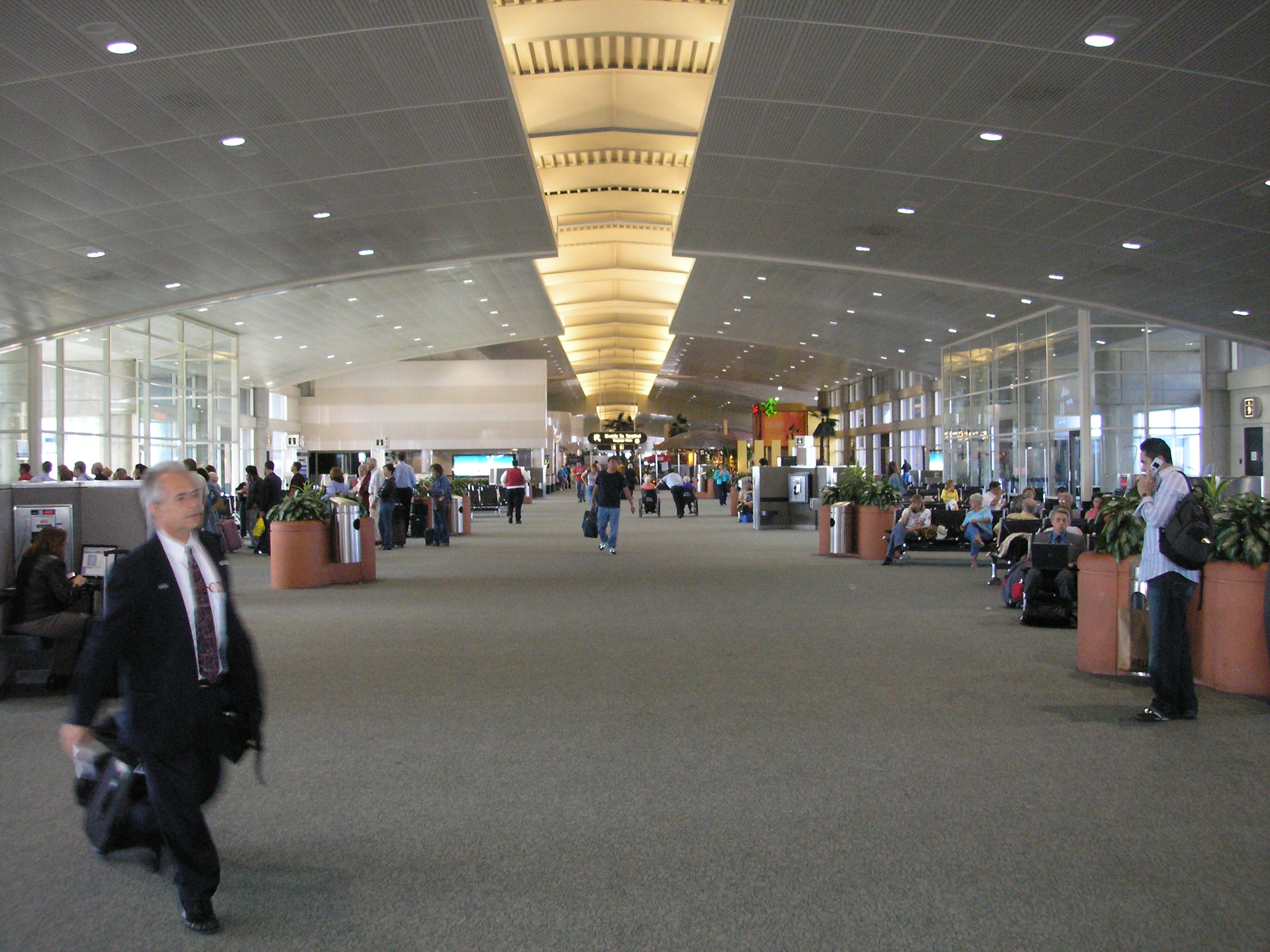
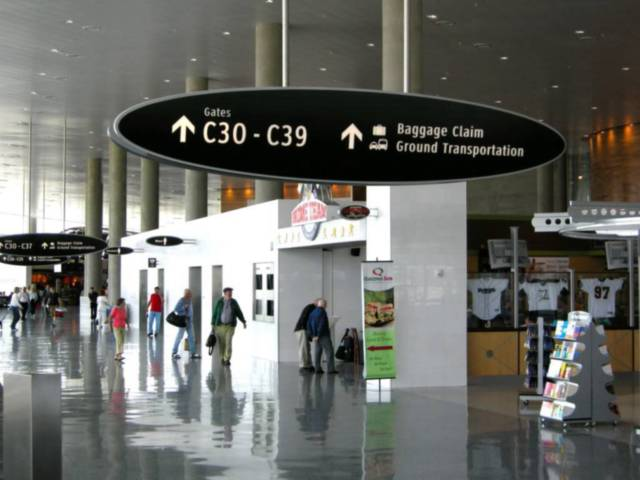
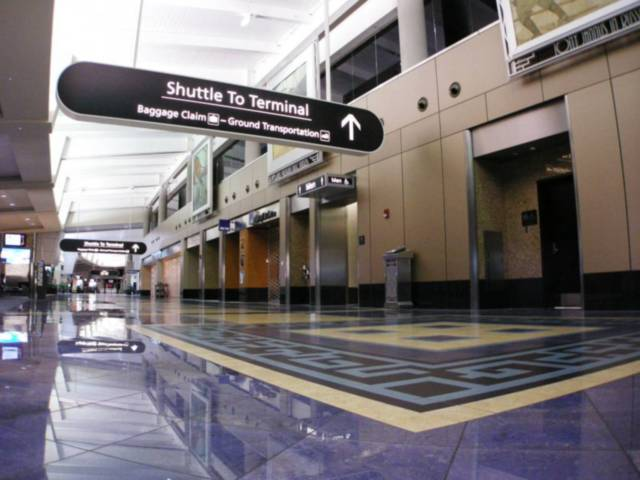
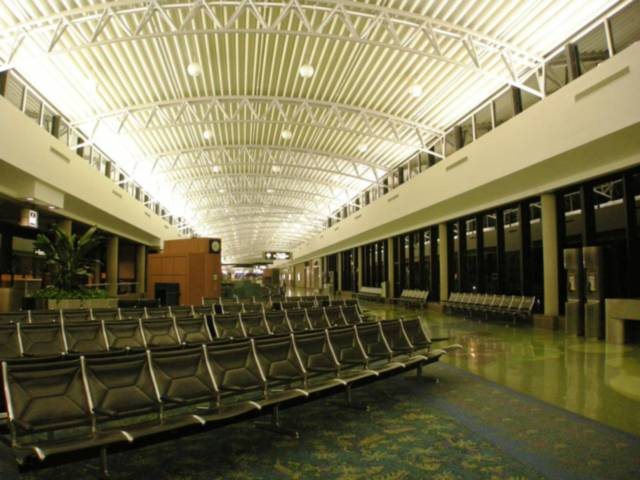
Airside A (top), Airside C (top-center), Airside E (bottom-center), Airside F (bottom)

Tampa International Airport's Landside/Airside terminal was the first of its type in the world. There is a central Landside Terminal where baggage and ticketing functions take place. The Landside Terminal is surrounded by four Airside satellites where airliner embarkment and disembarkment occur. Each Airside is connected to the Landside Terminal via an elevated automated people mover (APM) system which employs 16 Bombardier Innovia APM 100 Shuttle Cars, which are in the process of being replaced by Bombardier Innovia APM 300R C801B. TPA was the first airport in the world to deploy a fully automated, driver-free people mover system and is host to Bombardier Transportation's longest-running APM system. There are four active airsides (A, C, E, and F) with 59 gates. All were constructed after 1985 and all airsides include a food court and gift shop, as well as outdoor smoking patios. Airsides E and F contain duty-free shops in addition to the regular gift shops to serve passengers arriving or departing on international flights.

Additionally, a fifth airside (Airside D) is currently under construction as part of the airport's Master Plan Phase III.

- Airside A contains 16 gates (Gates A1, A3-A12, A14-A18). It serves Breeze Airways, JetBlue Airways, Sun Country Airlines, and United Airlines.
- Airside C contains 16 gates (Gates C30-C45). It serves Alaska Airlines, Avelo Airlines and Southwest Airlines.
- Airside D (Opening 2027) will contain 16 gates.
- Airside E contains 13 gates (Gates E62, E64-E75). It serves Air Canada, Delta Air Lines, and Frontier Airlines.
- Airside F contains 14 gates (Gates F78-F90). U.S. Customs and Immigration services for international flights are located on the lower level of Airside F. Airside F serves Aeromexico, American Airlines, Avianca, British Airways, Cayman Airways, Copa Airlines, Discover Airlines, Edelweiss Air, Havana Air, Porter Airlines, Virgin Atlantic, and WestJet.

=== Runways ===
Tampa International Airport covers an area of 3,300 acres (13 km^{2}) at an elevation of 26 feet (7.9 m) above mean sea level. It has three runways: 10/28 is 6,999 by 150 feet (2,133 × 46 m) with an Asphalt/concrete surface; 19L/1R is 8,300 by 150 feet (2,530 × 46 m) with an Asphalt/concrete surface; 19R/1L is 11,002 by 150 feet (3,353 × 46 m) with a concrete surface. On January 13, 2011 the runway designations changed due to a shift in the magnetic headings. 09/27 became 10/28, 18R/36L became 1L/19R, 18L/36R became 1R/19L.

=== Service building ===
When the airport opened its doors in 1971, the service building went into operation as well. It housed the first communications center, police dispatch, employee cafeteria and maintenance locker rooms. The building is located across from the Red Baggage and Ticketing levels. It was primarily intended to house mechanical equipment such as the chiller plant and electrical transformers. Since then it has been expanded to two levels which was in the original design in 1968. Today it houses the original facilities with the addition of offices, rental car counters, badging and a receptionist desk. The police department/lost and found has a lobby on level two (ticketing level) for walk-in lost & found requests.

=== Ground transportation ===
On February 14, 2018, a new 2.6-million-square-foot Rental Car Center with space for 5,300 vehicles, was opened to the public. The new combined service and maintenance facility is located near the southern edge of airport property and is connected to the terminal via a new train called SkyConnect. Unlike the landside/airside shuttles, SkyConnect uses Mitsubishi Crystal Mover vehicles. The trains run between the three stations in a pinched-loop configuration. Passengers on most domestic flights also have the ability to check their luggage inside the Rental Car Center. Rental car services were originally located adjacent to the Landside terminal, near the long-term-parking structure; however, relocation was necessary to accommodate more cars and rental car companies as the facilities were at or near capacity.

On the southwest end of the Rental Car Center is a canopy and platform that is used for both Hillsborough Area Regional Transit and Pinellas Suncoast Transit Authority bus services. The bus hub is accessible via a bank of elevators that connect directly to the Rental Car Center and is steps away from the SkyConnect station. With the upcoming 2nd phase of expansion at the airport, the intent is to expand upon the existing platform to eventually allow bus services from Pasco and perhaps even Hernando Counties to connect into the airport directly. The land immediately to the south of the Rental Car Center can also be configured for future light rail or commuter rail services if plans come to fruition.

== Airlines and destinations ==
=== Passenger ===
Airlines	Destinations	Refs
Aeroméxico	Mexico City–Benito Juárez	
Air Canada	Montréal–Trudeau, Toronto–Pearson	
Air Canada Rouge	Toronto–Pearson; Seasonal: Halifax, Ottawa	
Alaska Airlines	San Diego, Seattle/Tacoma; Seasonal: Portland (OR)	
American Airlines	Charlotte, Chicago–O'Hare, Dallas/Fort Worth, Miami, New York–LaGuardia, Philadelphia, Phoenix–Sky Harbor, Washington–National	
American Eagle	Miami, Nashville	
Avelo Airlines	Charlotte/Concord, Dallas/McKinney, New Haven, Wilmington (DE), Wilmington (NC)	
Avianca	Bogotá	
Breeze Airways	Akron/Canton, Atlantic City, Bangor, Cancún (begins December 18, 2026), Charleston (SC), Charleston (WV), Columbus–Glenn, Fayetteville/Bentonville, Fort Lauderdale, Greenville/Spartanburg, Gulfport/Biloxi, Hartford, Huntsville, Key West, Las Vegas (begins January 5, 2027), Long Island/Islip (begins January 6, 2027), Madison, Memphis, Montego Bay (begins December 19, 2026), Myrtle Beach, Nassau, New Orleans, Norfolk, Pensacola, Portland (ME), Providence, Punta Cana, Raleigh/Durham, Richmond, Rochester (NY), San José (CR), Santo Domingo–Las Américas (begins June 18, 2027), St. Thomas (begins December 16, 2026), Syracuse, Wilkes-Barre/Scranton Wilmington (NC); Seasonal: Burlington (VT), Erie, Louisville, Pittsburgh	
British Airways	London–Heathrow	
Cayman Airways	Grand Cayman	
Copa Airlines	Panama City–Tocumen	
Delta Air Lines	Amsterdam, Atlanta, Austin, Boston, Cincinnati, Detroit, Los Angeles, Minneapolis/St. Paul, New York–JFK, New York–LaGuardia, Raleigh/Durham, Salt Lake City, Seattle/Tacoma	
Discover Airlines	Frankfurt	
Edelweiss Air	Zürich	
Frontier Airlines	Atlanta, Baltimore, Buffalo, Cancún, Chicago–O'Hare, Cincinnati, Cleveland, Dallas/Fort Worth, Denver, Detroit, Philadelphia, Raleigh/Durham, San Juan, Trenton, Washington–Dulles; Seasonal: Grand Rapids, Houston–Intercontinental, Long Island/Islip, Milwaukee, Norfolk, Phoenix–Sky Harbor, Punta Cana, Santo Domingo–Las Américas	
JetBlue	Boston, Cancún, Fort Lauderdale, New York–JFK, Punta Cana, San Juan, White Plains; Seasonal: Long Island/Islip	
Porter Airlines	Seasonal: Halifax, Hamilton (ON) (begins December 18, 2026), Ottawa, Toronto–Pearson	
Southwest Airlines	Albany, Atlanta, Austin, Baltimore, Birmingham (AL), Buffalo, Chicago–Midway, Columbus–Glenn, Dallas–Love, Denver, Fort Lauderdale, Hartford, Havana, Houston–Hobby, Indianapolis, Kansas City, Knoxville, Las Vegas, Long Island/Islip, Los Angeles, Louisville, Milwaukee, Nashville, New Orleans, Philadelphia, Phoenix–Sky Harbor, Pittsburgh, Providence, Raleigh/Durham, Rochester (NY), San Antonio, San Diego, San Juan, St. Louis, Washington–National; Seasonal: Cincinnati, Grand Rapids, Manchester (NH), Memphis, Minneapolis/St. Paul, Omaha, Salt Lake City	
Sun Country Airlines	Minneapolis/St. Paul	
United Airlines	Chicago–O'Hare, Denver, Houston–Intercontinental, Los Angeles, Newark, San Francisco, Washington–Dulles; Seasonal: Cleveland	
Virgin Atlantic	London–Heathrow	
WestJet	Calgary, Toronto–Pearson; Seasonal: St. John's	

=== Cargo ===
Airlines	Destinations	Refs
FedEx Express	Indianapolis, Memphis	
UPS Airlines	Dallas/Fort Worth, Louisville, Philadelphia; Seasonal: Miami	

== Statistics ==
=== Annual traffic ===
Tampa Int'l Airport Annual Passengers 1971–Present
Year	Passengers	Year	Passengers	Year	Passengers	Year	Passengers
1971	3,438,518	1986	9,727,157	2001	15,888,436	2016	18,931,922
1972	4,249,266	1987	10,008,089	2002	15,494,668	2017	19,624,284
1973	4,848,645	1988	9,719,976	2003	15,523,568	2018	21,289,390
1974	5,074,845	1989	9,692,975	2004	17,396,836	2019	22,497,953
1975	5,166,284	1990	10,589,560	2005	19,045,390	2020	10,238,151
1976	5,476,712	1991	9,488,137	2006	18,867,491	2021	18,115,213
1977	5,855,924	1992	9,562,839	2007	19,154,957	2022	21,528,249
1978	6,984,037	1993	10,018,233	2008	18,262,934	2023	23,948,889
1979	8,198,579	1994	12,042,518	2009	16,965,545	2024	24,756,631
1980	7,669,399	1995	11,396,130	2010	16,645,765	2025	24,811,253
1981	7,083,621	1996	13,001,091	2011	16,670,315	2026	
1982	7,742,192	1997	13,370,630	2012	16,820,859	2027	
1983	8,228,049	1998	13,830,991	2013	16,920,093	2028	
1984	8,341,783	1999	15,122,326	2014	17,552,707	2029	
1985	8,873,532	2000	16,043,383	2015	18,815,425	2030	

- Source:Hillsborough County Aviation Authority archives.
- Since the opening of the new Tampa Int'l Airport in 1971, 736,612,345 passengers (enplaned+deplaned) have transited through TPA, an average of 13,392,952 passengers annually.

=== Airline market share ===
Largest airlines at TPA (August 2025 - July 2026)
Rank	Carrier	Passengers	Share
1	Southwest Airlines	5,713,000	25.73%
2	Delta Air Lines	4,372,000	19.69%
3	American Airlines	3,738,000	16.84%
4	United Airlines	2,535,000	11.42%
5	Frontier Airlines	2,078,000	9.36%
	Other	3,765,000	16.96%

=== Top destinations ===
Busiest domestic routes from TPA (August 2025 - July 2026)
Rank	City	Passengers	Carriers
1	Atlanta, Georgia	991,060	Delta, Frontier, Southwest, Spirit
2	Denver, Colorado	473,700	Frontier, Southwest, United
3	Chicago–O'Hare, Illinois	468,310	American, Frontier, Spirit, United
4	Charlotte, North Carolina	461,280	American, Frontier, Spirit
5	Dallas/Fort Worth, Texas	439,890	American, Frontier, Spirit
6	LaGuardia Airport, New York	401,230	American, Delta, JetBlue
7	Philadelphia, Pennsylvania	392,380	American, Frontier, Southwest
8	Newark, New Jersey	386,620	JetBlue, United
9	Boston, Massachusetts	377,660	Delta, JetBlue, Frontier
10	Detroit, Michigan	377,480	Delta, Frontier, Spirit

Busiest international routes from TPA (August 2025 - July 2026)
Rank	City	Passengers	Carriers
1	Toronto–Pearson, Canada	124,272	Air Canada, Air Canada Rouge, Porter, WestJet
2	Frankfurt, Germany	77,836	Discover Airlines
3	Panama City–Tocumen, Panama	74,791	Copa
4	London–Heathrow, United Kingdom	73,697	Virgin Atlantic
5	London–Gatwick, United Kingdom	67,690	British Airways
6	Montréal–Trudeau, Canada	49,793	Air Canada Rouge
7	Amsterdam, Netherlands	46,976	Delta
8	Cancún, Mexico	43,739	Frontier, JetBlue
9	Havana, Cuba	41,473	Southwest
10	Mexico City, Mexico	40,198	Aeroméxico

== Accidents and incidents ==
- On March 9, 1943, five USAAF flight crew were killed when their Martin B-26 Marauder crashed on a flight from Avon Park Auxiliary Field to Eglin Field. The pilot attempted an emergency landing at Drew Field and overshot the runway. Two others on board the B-26 survived. This occurred one hour after a USAAF Douglas A-24 flying out of Drew Field crashed in Mullet Key near St. Petersburg, a bombing range at the time. The pilot ditched the airplane and lived, but the gunner bailed out and drowned.
- On August 5, 1969, a passenger on an Eastern Air Lines McDonnell Douglas DC-9 on Flight 379 from Charlotte was arrested upon arrival after he entered the cockpit en route and told the pilot, "Let's go to Cuba"; the pilot said there wasn't enough fuel so the passenger returned to his seat. The hijacker later claimed he "wanted to see if he had the nerve to simulate a hijacking" and did not want to actually go to Cuba.
- On September 25, 1973, a Rockwell 1121B Jet Commander (N200RC) owned by Continental Jet Corp. was damaged beyond repair in a hangar fire.
- On November 6, 1986, an Eastern Air Lines captain, George Baines, age 56, was flying in his private aircraft, a Piper PA-23 Apache, (registration N2185P) from his home to Tampa International Airport to catch a flight. Captain Baines was cleared for an instrument landing system approach to runway 36L (now 1L) with 1/16-mile (0.10 km) visibility in dense fog. He was unable to land during his first approach and declared a missed approach and executed a go-around to try again. On the second approach, the Apache touched down on taxiway W, parallel to and about 406 feet (124 m) to the right (east) of runway 36L. At the same time, a Pan American Boeing B-727 was proceeding southbound on taxiway W. When the captain of the Pan-Am 727 saw the Apache emerge from the dense fog directly in front of him, he turned to the right (west) in an attempt to avoid the impending collision. About two seconds later, the Apache's left engine struck the B-727 in the radome, which is a structural, weatherproof enclosure that protects a radar antenna. Two passengers and a flight attendant were injured after they evacuated the aircraft. The Apache was almost destroyed and the pilot, the sole occupant of the aircraft, was killed. The primary causes of this accident was determined by the NTSB to include the pilot's decision to continue his approach below decision height when the visibility was below landing minimums and the adequacy of current Federal regulations that allow pilots operating under Part 91 to conduct approaches when the reported visibility is below published minimum visibility for land.
- On August 8, 1989, a Beechcraft Model 18 crashed into the parking lot of a Burger King due to dual engine failure shortly after taking off from the airport. The pilot and sole occupant, Warren Basler, suffered minor injuries.
- On December 1, 1993, a Cessna 650 Citation III (N700RR) operated by Consolidated International Services Inc. was landing when it collided with a cement pad while taxiing back to the grass taxiway, collapsing the nose gear. The plane had just arrived from a 2 hour 15 minute flight from Morristown, New Jersey. The cause was determined to be the pilot's decision to leave the taxiway with improper wiring of the anti-skid system. The plane was later repaired.
- On April 2, 2017, an Air Canada Jetz Airbus A319-114 (C-GBHN) was struck while parked by a motor coach during pre-departure setup for Flight 7042 to Fort Lauderdale. Substantial damage occurred on the port side of the fuselage and the left outer flap track. No injuries occurred onboard; the flight was cancelled. The aircraft was later repaired.

== See also ==
- List of airports in the Tampa Bay Area
