= Kids (Style of Eye song) =

Single by Style of Eye featuring Soso and Elliphant
- Released: 10 December 2013
- Genre: Dance; Electronic<
- Length: 4:11 (Original); 2:49 (Radio Edit)
- Label: Sony Music Entertainment Sweden
- Songwriter(s): Linus Johan Eklow, Salome Miranda Olovsdotter, Sophia Somajo & Svidden

Style of Eye singles chronology
"After Dark" (2013)	"Kids" (2013)	"Ray Dee Oh" (2014)

Soso singles chronology
"Who's Gonna Love Me" (2012)	"Kids" (2013)

Elliphant singles chronology
"Down On Life" (2013)	"Kids" (2013)

Kids is a song by Swedish DJ Style of Eye, featuring Soso and an uncredited appearance from Elliphant. Released on 10 December 2013 worldwide (excluding the United Kingdom), it was his fourth and final single of 2013. In the United Kingdom, it was released on 16 March 2014.

"Kids" peaked at 33 in Sweden and 76 in Germany.

== Certifications ==
Certifications for "Kids"
Region	Certification	Certified units/sales
Sweden (GLF)	Platinum	40,000^{‡}
^{‡} Sales+streaming figures based on certification alone.

== Release history ==
Release history for "Kids"
Country	Date	Format	Label
Worldwide (excluding UK)	10 December 2013	Digital download	Ultra / Sony Music Entertainment Sweden
United Kingdom	16 March 2014	Digital download	Sony Music Entertainment Sweden
