= Dan Lacey =

American painter (c. 1960 – 2022)

- Born: December 15, 1960; Brooklyn, New York, United States
- Died: February 7, 2022 (aged 61)
- Known for: Painting popular culture icons, politicians, and Internet memes

Dan Lacey (c. December 15, 1960 – February 7, 2022) was an American painter born in Brooklyn, New York, who was the self-described "Painter of Pancakes". His work commonly features popular culture icons (including Kanye West, Stephen Colbert, Michael Jackson, and Prince), politicians (including Joe Biden, Kamala Harris, Donald Trump, Hillary Clinton, Barack Obama, Bernie Sanders and Sarah Palin), Mikey and Bob, and Internet memes, most notably, related to pancakes and cats.

Lacey's work has been widely featured in print news, social media and television shows. Barack Obama and Prince were the frequent subjects in his works.

Lacey died from brain cancer on February 7, 2022, at the age of 61.

== Notable works ==
Nude Justin Bieber painting owned by Macklemore.
