= Francine Tint =

American artist

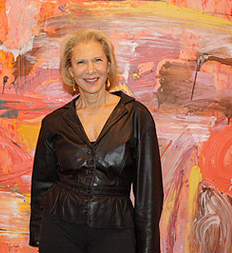
- Tint with "RED" (53 × 122 in)
- Born: New York City, U.S.
- Education: Pratt Institute; Brooklyn Museum Art School
- Known for: Abstract art; Costume design
- Awards: Pollock-Krasner Foundation; Adolph and Esther Gottlieb Foundation; Artist's Fellowship Inc.
- Website: www.francinetint.com

Francine Tint is an American abstract expressionist painter based in New York City. She is known for her gestural painting style and has also worked extensively as a television and film costume designer.

== Career ==
=== Art ===
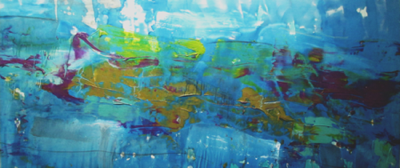
"Sea of Mirmar" (45 × 106 in)

Tint studied at the Pratt Institute and the Brooklyn Museum College.

She began exhibiting her work in galleries during the 1970s. Her early paintings are characterized by gestural, lyrical brushstrokes with circling and looping motifs. In her later work, color becomes a dominant element, with increased surface tension and compositional tautness.

Tint has had nearly thirty solo exhibitions and has participated in approximately fifty group shows across the United States and Europe. Her work is held in the permanent collections of several institutions, including the Clement Greenberg collection at the Portland Art Museum, the Krannert Art Museum in Champaign, Illinois, and the Neuberger Museum of Art.

Her paintings are also in private and corporate collections such as PepsiCo and Mount Sinai Hospital. She is represented by Cavalier Galleries and Denise Bibro Fine Art in New York City.

A 2018 exhibition at Cavalier Galleries was featured in the print edition of D'Art International.

Tint cites Antoni Tàpies, Larry Poons, Hans Hofmann, Jules Olitski, and Helen Frankenthaler as influences on her work.

=== Costume design ===
Tint also worked for many years as a television and film costume designer, contributing to projects for ESPN, David Bowie, and Ridley Scott, among others.

She has noted that her experience in costume design has influenced her painting, particularly in the layering of materials, which she compares to the layering of fabrics in fashion design.
