= The Eye of Mexico =

Sculpture in Mexico City

- El Ojo de México (Spanish)
- A 20-second gif with the central ring in operation
- Location
- Artist: Ferdi Alıcı (Ouchhh Studio)
- Year: 2022
- Dimensions: 10 m × 3 m (33 ft × 9.8 ft)
- Location: Mexico City; 19°26′38″N 99°12′05″W
- Owner: MIRA and MASSIVart
- Website: neuchatel.mx/eye-of-mexico

The Eye of Mexico (Spanish: El Ojo de México) is an outdoor sculpture in Mexico City. It is located in Ampliación Granada, Miguel Hidalgo, at the mixed-use development Neuchâtel Polanco, developed by the Canadian real estate company Ivanhoé Cambridge. The artwork was created by the Turkish artist Ferdi Alıcı and it was selected from among 350 proposals from artists from 35 countries.

The project for The Eye of Mexico was developed by MIRA, a real estate investment and development company, and MASSIVart, a creative consulting agency. According to MIRA, upon its inauguration it became the first artwork in Latin America to use artificial intelligence (AI). The sculpture can read environmental and urban data using AI algorithms and transform the results into videos related to arts, science and technology. The ring was inaugurated on 20 May 2022 and it is 10 meters (33 ft) high and 3 meters (9.8 ft) wide.

== See also ==
- Artificial intelligence art
