= Arnold Skolnick =

American graphic artist and book publisher (1937–2022)

- Born: Arnold H. Skolnick; February 25, 1937; Brooklyn, New York, U.S.
- Died: June 15, 2022 (aged 85); Amherst, Massachusetts, U.S.
- Occupations: Graphic Designer, book publisher

Arnold H. Skolnick (February 25, 1937 – June 15, 2022) was an American graphic artist and book publisher. His best-known work is the original 1969 poster for the Woodstock Art and Music Fair.

== 1969 Woodstock poster ==
Skolnick's 1969 Woodstock poster showed a white catbird perched on the neck of an acoustic guitar with a hand holding it.

Woodstock Ventures asked Skolnick to design a music and art fair poster. Skolnick's son Peter remembers watching his father cut the words and bird from paper. He also remembers his father trying different layouts. Skolnick was hired on a Thursday and delivered the poster the following Monday around 11 am. Although much money has been made from Skolnick's symbol, he received only one royalty check of about $15. While Skolnick won many awards, perhaps his 1969 and his 40th anniversary Woodstock posters are his most famous.

== Book publishing ==
Skolnick next started Imago Imprint, a company that published, designed, and produced mostly art books. It was established in New York City and led to a number of published books such as Lightest Blues (Great Humor from the 1930s) and Paul Cadmus. His company Chameleon Books led to many more art books such as The Lyrical Constructivist: Don Gummer Sculpture, The Girl with the Watering Can, Hyman Bloom, and Times Squared (photographs by Toby Old). He also worked on projects with companies such as Carl Little, Pomegranate, Down East Books, Potter, Rizzoli, First Glance Books, and Chronicle Books.

== Fine artist ==
Skolnick's drawings, paintings, and photography have been exhibited in Massachusetts at the Oxbow, Michelson & William Baczek Fine Art Galleries and in various galleries in New York City.

== Death ==
Skolnick died on June 15, 2022. His son, Alexander Skolnick, stated that the cause of death was respiratory failure.

== Gallery exhibitions ==
- 1976 Rolly Michaux Galleries, New York, NY
- 2004 Members Group Show (Paintings), Oxbow Gallery, Northampton, MA
- 2005 Earth, Water, Sky (paintings & photographs), Painter Arnold Skolnick and Photographer Robert Aller, Oxbow Gallery, Northampton, Ma
- 2006 Nudes and Still Life, Paintings & Drawings, (with Robert Aller, photographer), Oxbow Gallery, Northampton, MA
- 2008 Landscape Paintings & Drawings, Oxbow Gallery, Northampton, MA
- 2008 Love Song: The Erotic Photographs of Arnold Skolnick, Michelson Gallery, Northampton, MA
- 2008 Love Song: The Erotic Photographs of Arnold Skolnick, Babcock Galleries, New York
- 2010 Antique and Artisan Center, Stamford, CT
- 2011 Color and Rhythm, Paintings by Arnold Skolnick, Elizabeth Moss Gallery, Falmouth, Maine
- 2014 Spinoza's God: Paintings by Arnold Skolnick, Elizabeth Moss Gallery, Falmouth, Maine
- 2017 Light Touch, Nudes In White Charcoal, Elusie Gallery, Easthampton, MA
- 2017 Eyes of Western Massachusetts, Colson Gallery, Eastworks, Easthampton, MA

== Articles and reviews ==
- Hennessy, Christina, "Woodstock poster designer's paintings on exhibit in Stamford", Stamford Advocate, Friday, October 15, 2010
