= Kaynemaile Architectural Mesh =

Chainmail fabric

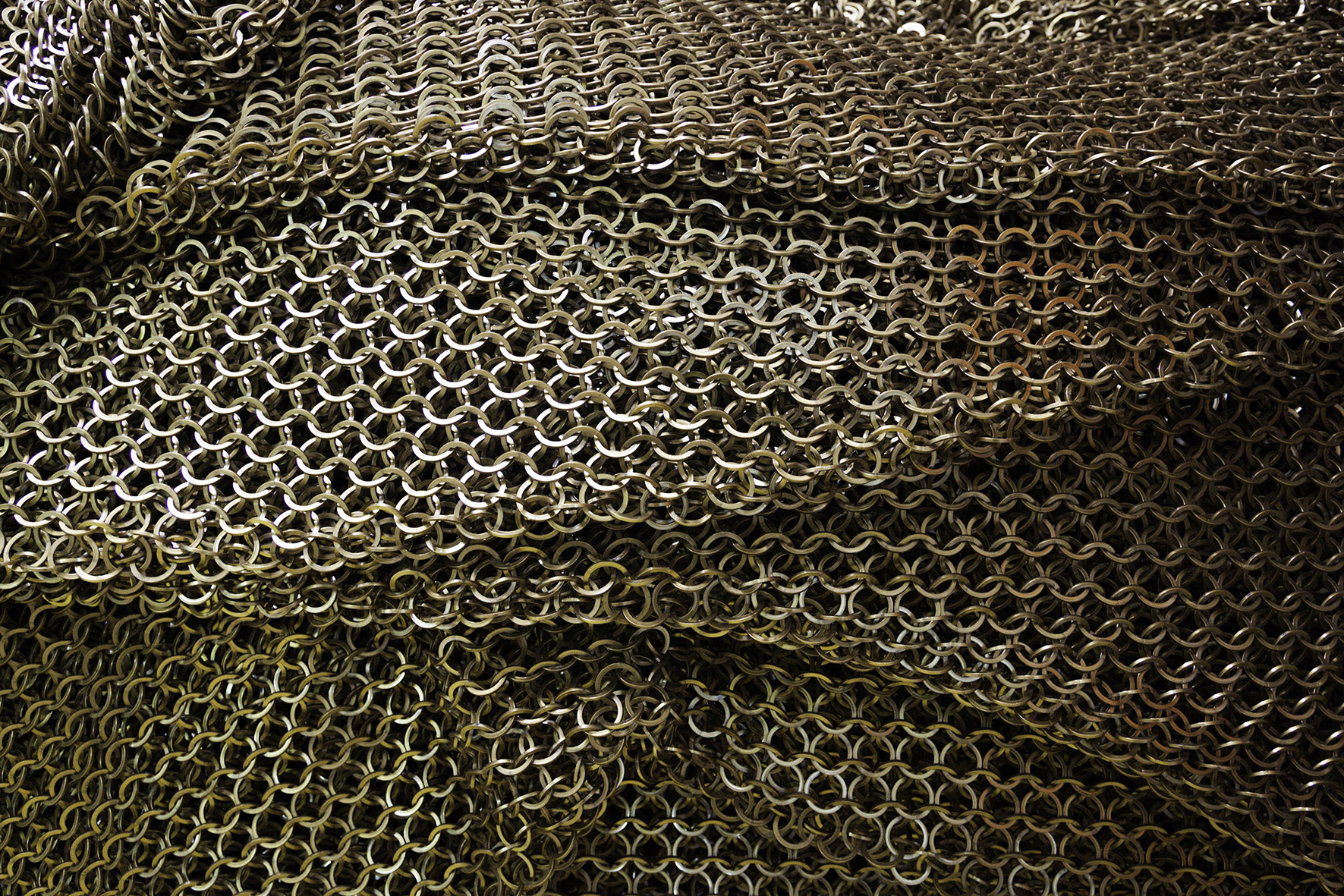
Gold Kaynemaile Architectural Mesh up close.

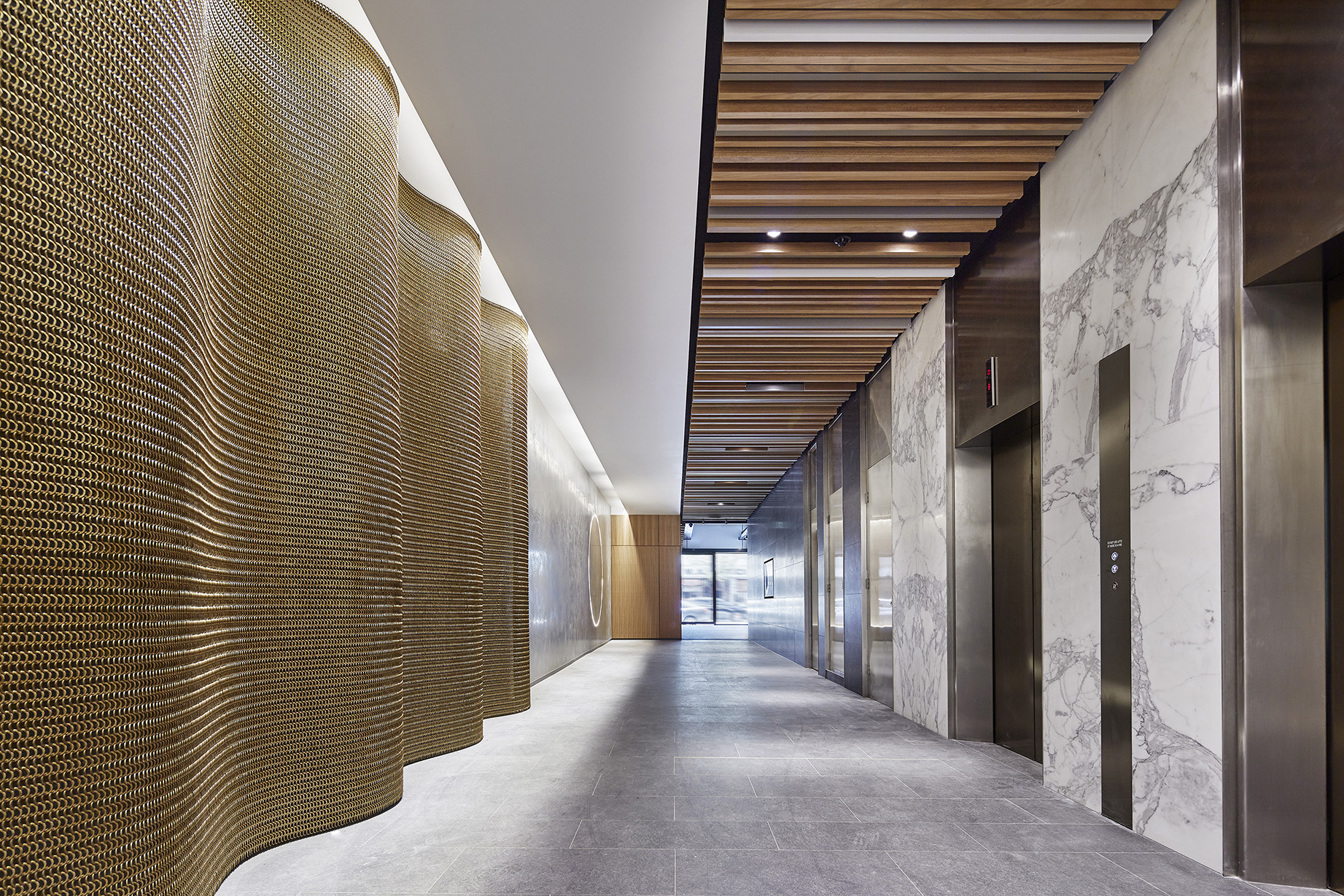
Kaynemaile in Perth

Kaynemaile is a chainmail fabric consisting of polycarbonate interlinked rings connected together by liquid-state assembly to form a flexible mesh sheet. It is made from polycarbonate and used in the architecture and design industry. It was invented by Kayne Horsham in 2004.

== History ==
The first prototypes of Kaynemaile were created within Weta Workshop's Creatures, Armor and Weapons department for The Lord of The Rings movie trilogy. Real metal chainmail was identified as too heavy for the actors to wear or do stunts. Kaynemaile was created as a chainmail fabric that looked and moved like real chainmail, but without the weight, made of polycarbonate resin rings with no joints or seams in the links. The material was created by a team of New Zealand based chainmail technicians manually interconnect millions of polypropylene (PP) rings and used electroplating process to apply silver on the outside. The result produced the realistic looking chainmail armor used throughout the movies. The new chainmail rings were incorporated into the costume design of characters such as Aragorn and Boromir, the Gondorian race and Rohan armies, and many of the Orcs. The chainmail was nicknamed “Kayne's-mail” by Viggo Mortensen.

== Mass production ==
A company, Kaynemaile Ltd, was co-founded in 2006 by Kayne Horsham and Robyn Downham to streamline the process and make it commercially available, as architectural mesh. Its creation is now automated through a liquid-state injection molding fabrication process.

The mesh is used to form large architectural building wraps, 3D shapes or seamless screens. It has been used as a lightweight, reflective, permeable membrane for buildings.

== RE/8™ Bio-circular Architectural Mesh ==
In 2023, Kaynemaile changed its mesh material to one that is bio-circular. Named RE/8 Bio-circular Architectural Mesh, the new material is composed of a carbon neutral polycarbonate by Covestro, a producer of advanced polymers.

== Awards ==
Fast Company Innovation by Design Awards 2024, Honoree in categories: Biodesign, Circular Design, Materials

Architizer A+ Awards 2024, Jury Winner in Building Envelopes, Cladding & Roofing

Architizer A+ Awards 2024, Popular Choice Winner in Sustainable Design

Architectural Record Products of the Year 2023, Winner in Building Systems and Components in recognition of its full-scale sustainability initiatives

The Wellington Gold Awards 2023, Winner Global Gold

Civil + Structural Engineer YEA Award 2022, Winner in Environmental / Sustainability category

Architizer A+ Awards 2020, Product Winner in Facades, Building Envelopes & Cladding

Architecture MasterPrize 2019, Winner in Building Envelope & Construction Materials

Wellington Gold Awards 2018, Finalist Global Gold

NYCxDesign Award 2017, Best Architectural Product

designEX Award 2014, Best New Innovative Product

New Zealand Plastics Industry Design Award 2008, Gold

Designpreis Halle Award 2008, Nominee

iF Design Award 2007, Discipline: Material
