= Kid Chan =

Malaysian photographer (born 1978)

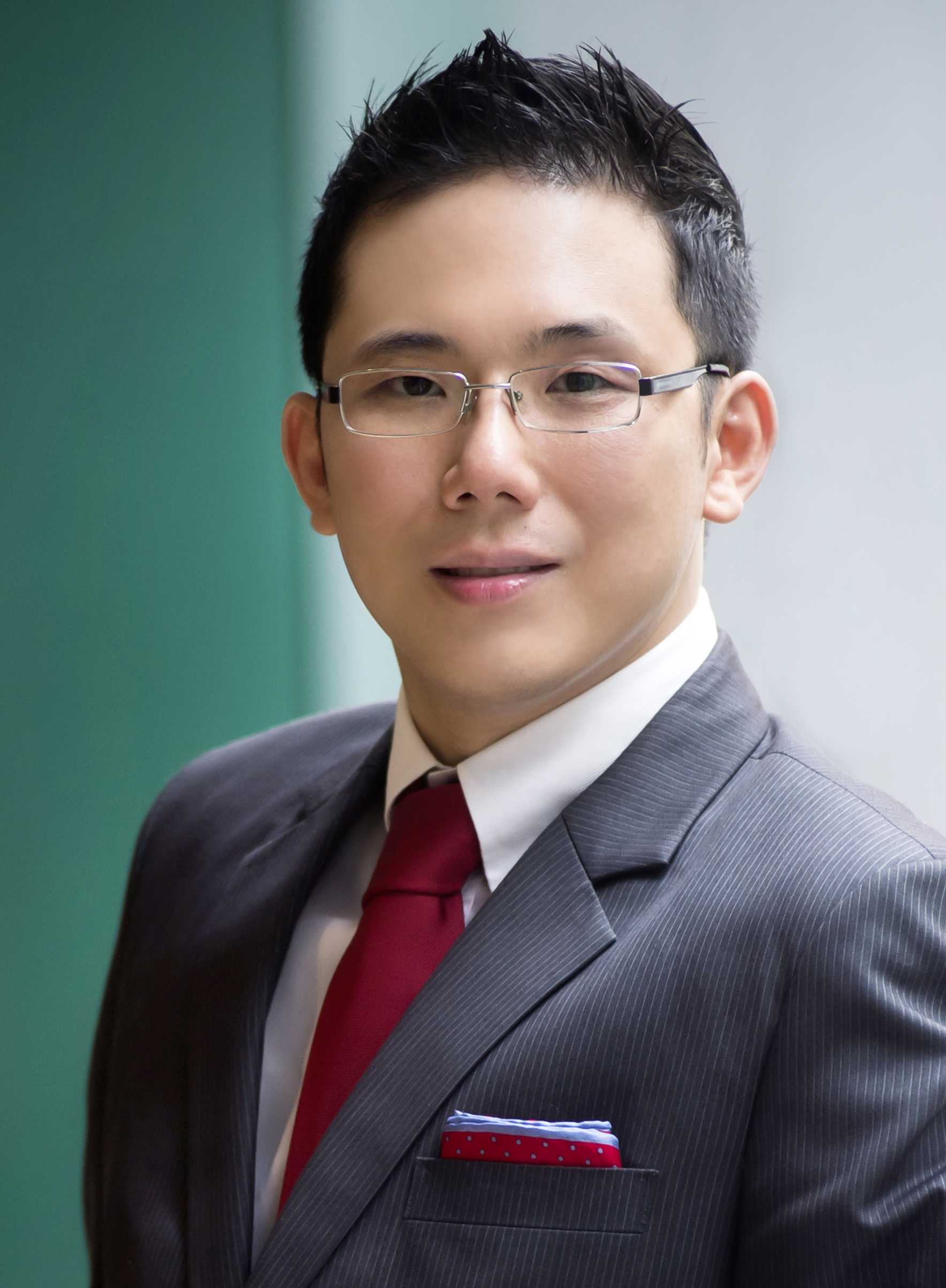
- Born: 15 January 1978 (age 48); Kuala Lumpur, Malaysia
- Known for: Photography

Chinese name
- Traditional Chinese: 陳文傑
- Simplified Chinese: 陈文杰
- Hanyu Pinyin: Chén Wénjié
- Yale Romanization: Chàhn Màhn-giht
- Jyutping: Chan4 Man4 Git6
- Hokkien POJ: Tân Bûn-kia̍t

Kid Chan (born 15 January 1978) is a Malaysian wedding photojournalist and portrait photographer.

== Early life and education ==
Born and raised in Kuala Lumpur, the capital of Malaysia, Chan attended the Sri Cempaka school before pursuing a degree in international business from the Curtin University of Technology in Perth, Australia.

== Career ==
He began working as an executive assistant before taking up photography as his exclusive job. After two years, Chan left to take up an apprenticeship at a photography studio.

In 2000, he took over Portrait One, a company he renamed "Kid Chan Studio". Initially, Chan concentrated on corporate photography and photographed the weddings of his clients' children. He has since photographed royalty, politicians, artists, celebrities, and the weddings of Asian celebrities. He was the official photographer for the wedding of Tengku Aslahuddin Jaa'far and Sofia Erica Lane and was featured on the cover of Harper's Bazaar.

In 2010, his photo collection of three cancer survivors and their families was exhibited in 50 Courts Malaysia's stores nationwide as part of an exhibition to raise funds for the National Cancer Society of Malaysia. In 2012, he was appointed the ambassador for a campaign promoting cancer screening in Malaysia.

In 2013, Chan published the book Kid Chan's Guide to the Business of Photography, which covers setting up a photography business from a Malaysian perspective.

== Recognition ==
Chan was named by Malaysian Tatler as "one of the 100 people you must know in Asia" in 2006.

== Personal life ==
Chan is married to Shirlyn Lim, a chartered accountant.

== Publications ==
- Kid Chan's Guide to the Business of Photography (MPH, 2013)
