= Kidz Magazine =

Kidz Magazine (1995–2007) was a Boulder County-based publication launched in 1995 by entrepreneur and father of six, Scott Smith. Smith developed the idea for the magazine with Glenn Meyers, another father and Spanish instructor at the University of Colorado-Boulder, as they stood outside their children's school discussing ways to further inspire kids towards reading and writing. Their belief was that kids would be more interested in reading things that were written by their peers than content created for them by adults. They also believed that children would be more inspired to write if they knew that an audience of their peers would end up reading the material.

"I thought they might enjoy what each other wrote better, and indeed they do," said Smith.

== Content ==
Kidz Magazine collected submissions from school children in the form of poems, short stories, puzzles, drawings, invention ideas, and jokes. Those authors and artists who were published in the magazine were paid $25 for puzzles and jokes, $50 for various forms of art and writing, and $100 to both the child and their school for cover art. In addition, published contributors received a certificate of accomplishment. But recently from the start of 2011 they started giving KidzPoints instead.

== Circulation ==
At the height of its existence, Kidz Magazine received an average of 1,000 submissions each month, and was distributed in 32 countries with a circulation of 578,009.

=== Kidz Magazine's International Reach ===
Australia
Bolivia
Brazil
Canada
Cayman Islands
Colombia
Costa Rica
Cuba
Czech Republic
El Salvador
Estonia

(Germany)

Guatemala
India
Indonesia
Israel
Japan
Malaysia
Mexico
Puerto Rico
Scotland
Senegal

Singapore
South Africa
South Korea
Sri Lanka
Switzerland
Thailand
Turkey
Uganda
United Kingdom
United States

== Discontinued Publication ==
Smith funded the publication by collecting investment and selling ad space in the magazine to classroom-friendly sponsors. As the company grew rapidly from a local publication into an international media channel, however, the local sales staff was unable to keep up. In turn, Kidz Magazine decided to postpone publication in December 2007 while the corporation was restructured to handle its success.

== Acquisition and Relaunch (Youth Intermedia and KidzEra) ==
In 2009, Kidz Magazine was purchased by Youth Intermedia, which plans to relaunch the magazine in September 2009 under the name "KidzEra" as part of a multimedia platform that will extend kids' ability to share their work with peers around the world. They have changed the magazine completely. Now it is much harder to get published, you no longer get money, and you don't get a certificate of publication as publishers used to.
