= Earth Goddess (sculpture) =

2022 sculpture by Sandy Brown

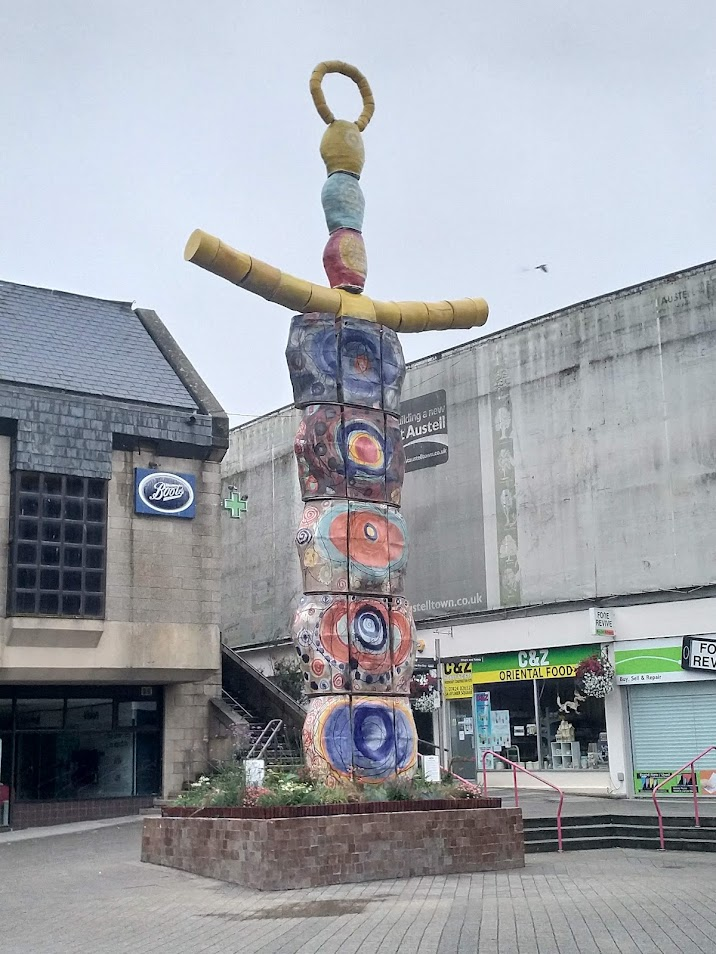
- Artist: Sandy Brown
- Year: June 2022
- Medium: Ceramic sculpture
- Dimensions: 1150 cm × 600 cm (450 in × 240 in)
- Location: St Austell, Cornwall, England
- 50°20′15.5″N 4°47′39.1″W

Earth Goddess is a ceramic sculpture in St Austell, Cornwall. It was created by ceramicist Sandy Brown and was unveiled in June 2022. It is the tallest ceramic sculpture in the United Kingdom.

== Description ==
Earth Goddess stands in a square in the town of St Austell in Cornwall. It was created by the English ceramicist Sandy Brown and depicts a female figure with outstretched tubular arms and decorated with bright 'blobs' of colour. Its body consists of five large circles of clay, each formed in three sections, placed on top of each other somewhat like beads threaded on a pole. The statue is 11.5 metres (38 ft) in height with 6-metre (20 ft) wide arms and upon completion was the tallest ceramic sculpture in the United Kingdom.

== Background ==
Earth Goddess was created at a cost of £90,000 as part of the Austell Projects – Whitegold Art Trail of 18 newly commissioned public art works of ceramic sculpture to reflect the historic china clay industry of St Austell. The trail is intended to form part of the economic regeneration of St Austell. The curator of the Austell Projects, Alex Murdin, said that the purpose of the project was "encouraging people to think differently about their place and see it differently as well".

Brown described her motivation for creating Earth Goddess as wanting "to make an impact and I wanted her to be female and making an impact". Brown chose a female form because of her perception that there was a lack of large-scale female forms in public art and because of memories of her mother, who "was criticised by her parents for being a girl. They were farmers, they wanted sons. And so my mother was never able to celebrate being female, so I think it's about time that we did."

== Reception ==
Many residents of St Austell have criticised Earth Goddess. A town councillor, Richard Pears, said he liked it and thought that "the purpose of art is to provoke, it's to be worthy of talking about. A sculpture that nobody gave a damn about would be a complete waste of everybody's time." But the local Member of Parliament, Steve Double, said that 90% of the opinions that he was aware of were negative, and that he would not be present at the official unveiling of the statue. A group of local church leaders wrote a letter to St Austell Town Council condemning the statue as "idolatrous" and calling for its renaming or removal. In 2026, a survey of 500 residents and other stakeholders by the St Austell Town Team found 90 per cent disliked the statue or thought it inappropriate for its location and wanted it to be removed. Preferred sites included parks and gardens, the Eden Project, the Lost Gardens of Heligan near Mevagissey, and Wheal Martyn Clay Works at Carthew.

At the time of the statue's unveiling, Brown said that she had not experienced such criticism before. She compared the negative reception of the piece to the criticism of Anthony Gormley's Angel of the North and works by Barbara Hepworth, saying "that can happen ... in time people grow to love [such works]". Of the finished work, she said "I think she looks amazing, I'm really pleased with her".
