= Ronald Sherr =

American portrait painter (1952–2022)

Ronald Sherr (July 17, 1952 – December 7, 2022) was an American portrait painter. He depicted many well-known politicians and businesspeople.

== Biography ==
Sherr was born in 1952 in New Jersey. He attended the DuCret School of Art and the National Academy of Design. He had studios in New York City and Hong Kong.

Sherr died on December 7, 2022, at the age of 70.

== Notable subjects ==
Name	Year	Location	Ref.
George H. W. Bush	1995	National Portrait Gallery	
George W. Bush	2002	?	
Peter W. Stanley	2003	Pomona College	
Colin Powell	2012	National Portrait Gallery	
John Boehner	2019	United States Capitol	
Nancy Pelosi	2014	United States Capitol	
Anthony M. Kennedy	Not yet unveiled	Supreme Court of the United States	
