= Lewis Stein =

American artist (1945–2022)

- Born: 1945; New York City
- Died: April 22, 2022 (aged 76–77); New York City

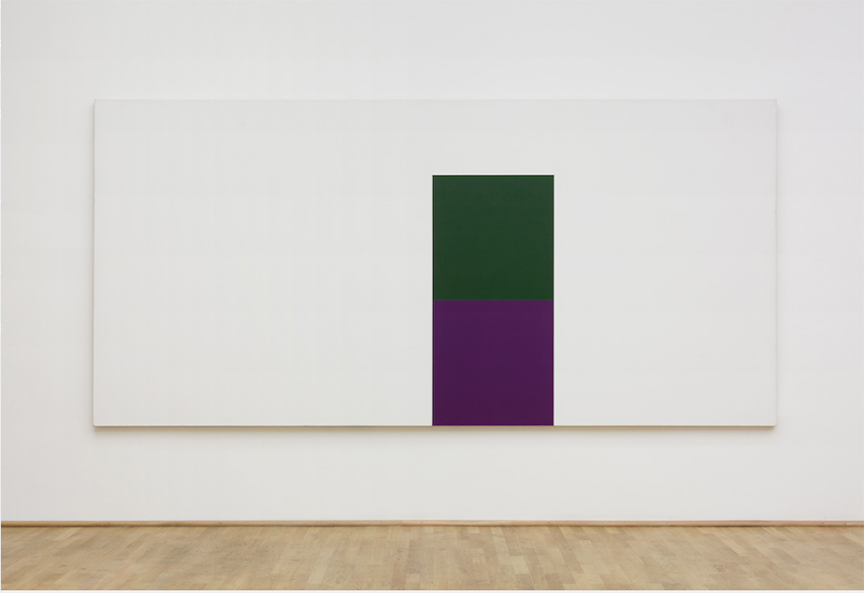
Untitled, 1967-9, acrylic on gessoed canvas, 6 1/2’ x 14’ (198 x 427 cm) on display in 2009 at Museum of Modern Kunst, Frankfurt, Germany

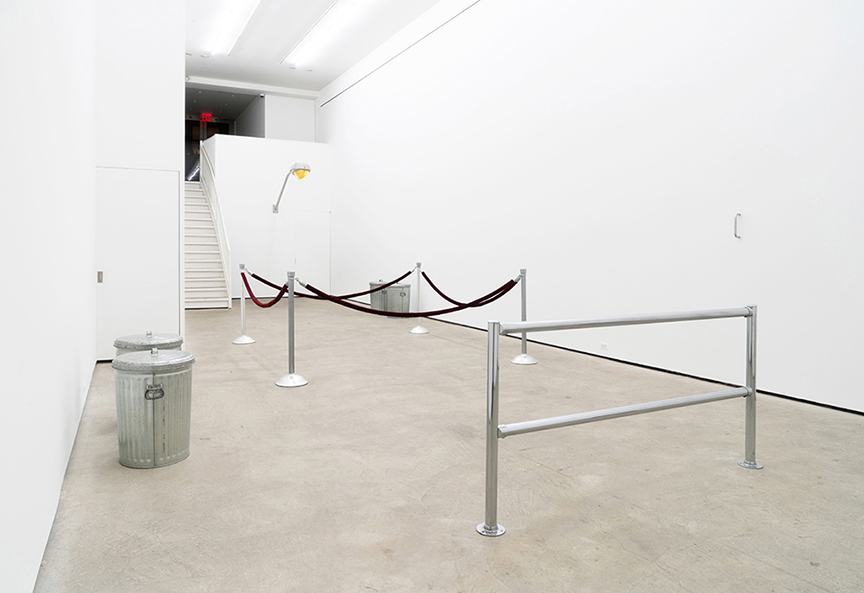
Installation view Essex Street Gallery, 2017, All works 1968-1980

Lewis Stein (1945 – April 22, 2022) was an American visual artist who lived in New York City.

== Early life and education ==
Stein was born in New York City in 1945. He attended the Massachusetts Institute of Technology in Cambridge, Massachusetts, between 1964 and 1966, and the University of California at Berkeley between 1966 and 1968. He studied architecture at MIT and sculpture at the University of California at Berkeley.

== Work ==
Stein's earliest work consisted of large acrylic or alkyd on gessoed canvas paintings in the minimalist mode which he had described as “anti-paintings.” As he explained to Mousse Magazine in 2017, “I was using painting to deconstruct painting. I wasn’t thinking of making fun of painting, but they’re funny paintings.”

The artist was represented in the Whitney Annual (precursor to the Whitney Biennial) in 1969 at age 24. His first exhibits, all solo shows, were at the Nicholas Wilder Gallery in Los Angeles, the David Whitney Gallery in New York and the Rolf Ricke Gallery in Cologne, Germany between 1969 and 1972. He was introduced to each of these galleries by the noted dealer Richard Bellamy. Bellamy, in turn, had in turn been introduced to Stein by the artist and critic Brian O’Doherty who had visited the artist at his Oakland studio in 1968.

Stein's output expanded to include object pieces, installations and photographic-based art over the succeeding decades. A retrospective of Stein's works between 1968 and 1971 was held in the fall of 2017 at New York's Essex Street Gallery. Artforum’s critic determined that Stein’s object pieces, “isolated and stripped of their abilities to punish, regulate or restrict,” offered “a kind of realism predicated on the physiological response to stimulus—a rare opportunity to be intimate with a set of specific spatial relationships that govern conduct.”. Frieze Magazine's reviewer, Josephine Graf, appraised the show as making “a compelling argument for revisiting Stein’s oeuvre. Stein separates the readymade from its Duchampian irony, revealing instead how everyday objects can guide visibility and delimit movement in a subtle and concise form of policing.” Evaluating the same exhibit, Art Review scribe Jeppe Ugelvig opined that “Lewis spatialized and readymades are--like most derivatives of ‘hostile’ and ‘regulatory’ architectures—seductive in their violence, and their position as deeply antagonistic in particular, to the idealist project of Minimalism and its pursuit of perceptual objectivity.”

A thread that ran through much of Stein’s work was the effect of perceptual structures upon human experiences. Of a 1986 show at Postmasters Gallery featuring a series of household hammers--one of the artist’s earliest works--alongside photographs of light sources from the '80s, Art in America critic, Paul Smith, observed that both the hammers and the photographic images “can be seen as addressing a similar deadened frustration of function and expectation in traditional art.” He noted that Stein's “other recent photographic series--of surveillance cameras, shadows and chandeliers suggest that he was not so interested in frustration per se as he was in the rich visual possibilities of the readymade world.” In a series of photographs of cows begun in the 1990s, Stein photographs the animals staring directly into the viewer's eyes, prompting him to wonder if he himself is being examined by the cow.

The contrast between expectation and reality is another theme recurring throughout Stein's works. For a 1990 exhibit at the Paula Allen Gallery consisting of photographs of mirrors from the pages of mail order catalogs blown-up to life size, Artforum reviewer John Miller felt a sense of “a creeping shoddiness overriding the too-familiar elegance this hybridization typically yields and relies upon.” Instead of evoking glamour or polish, the "specific of mail order furnishings does not exactly conjure up visions of luxury,” Miller concluded. Likening a series of Stein's photographs of chandeliers to “switched-on May Ray,” the New Yorker declared that “A single idea--that light is photogenic--goes quite far.” [10] The Village Voice described the same show as “big, dumb, black-and-white pictures of electric chandeliers glowing out of pitch black space [that] “fill the gallery with a cold, postmod light.”

Like other artists who were shaped by the ferment of the 1960s. Stein's work also addressed social and political issues of the day. Of his black-and-white photographs of surveillance cameras which appeared in a show at New York's Queen's Museum in 1986, curator Marc H. Miller declared that “Though 1984 has come and gone, Orwell’s vision of Big Brother is still a real possibility….Stein's photographs are a reminder that TV is not just something we watch, but something that is watching us.” Of the artist's playfully ironic stock photograph of an Oster brand blender perched alongside strawberries and a pink milkshake in a House Beautiful-perfect kitchen, critic Noah Dillon opined: “Without an advertiser’s text, Stein’s photograph points less to the blender that is its formal centerpiece, and more to the amorphous sense of fulfillment the machine is equipped to provide.”

Among his influences, Stein cited Marcel Duchamp, Andy Warhol, Ad Reinhardt and Robert Morris.

Stein's work has been shown in galleries and museums throughout the United States. It is also held in numerous public and private collections.

Lewis Stein's first posthumous exhibition opened on July 1, 2024 at Maxwell Graham, New York.
