= The Kid (artist) =

French multidisciplinary contemporary artist

Robin Kid, a.k.a. The Kid (born 1991) is a French multidisciplinary contemporary artist, from Dutch descent. His neo-pop artwork hijack a variety of social, political, and traditional imagery of the past and present, with rebellious, religious, fantastical, and in some ways offensive undertones. He pulls intuitively from the world of advertising, the Internet, the entertainment industry, and his childhood memories, to produce ambitious, enigmatic, and thought-provoking narratives, which question our polarized world of the 21st century. He confronts the audience with, among other notions, social determinism and the thin frontier between innocence and corruption within his young generation in modern societies. The Kid lives and works in Paris, France where he has his main studio for drawings and paintings and in Amsterdam, the Netherlands for sculptures.

His art works include wall-size blue Bic ballpoint pen or charcoal drawings and oil paintings as well as hand-made hyper-realistic lifesize silicon or bronze sculptures and art installations in various materials. In recent years, The Kid's works have been exhibited at Le Louvre, the Institute Of Contemporary Art, The Grand Palais (National Museums Reunion), the Halle Saint Pierre Paris City Municipal Museum in Montmartre or the Paris City Cultural Center Centquatre in Paris (France), the Alpes Maritimes Regional Museum Lympia in Nice (France), the MOCO Museum in Amsterdam (The Netherlands), the 21st Century Museums in Chicago and in Louisville (USA), and during solo and group shows at International contemporary art galleries, in particular Templon Gallery (Paris, Brussels, New York) as well as at International art fairs, in particular Art Basel and Volta in Basel (Switzerland), Art Basel Miami Beach and Pulse in Miami (USA), or FIAC and Art Paris in Paris, among other venues.

== Inspiration ==
When asked ″although your characters are caught in a very shady moment, there is something beautiful and poetic in the way they are represented, tell us more about this duality″, The Kid answered ″I’ve always been attracted by this line in The Picture of Dorian Gray by Oscar Wilde: ″behind every exquisite thing lies something tragic″, I think this is pretty much what all of my works have in common. Despite their youth and beauty, all of my subjects are doomed to fail, like a flower is destined to fade. And I try to capture them in their defining moment, forever caught between innocence and corruption." And he added ″I want to question the audience about social determinism, the thin frontier between innocence and corruption, the equality of chances, or the fading line between right and wrong in our modern societies.″

== Exhibitions (extracts) ==
- The Future Is Old (Solo Show, February 8, 2024 – February 7, 2026, Museum of Modern and Contemporary Art of Barcelona, Barcelona, Spain).
- This We Believe (January 14, 2024 – June 24, 2025, Twenty-First Century Museum of Contemporary Art 21c, Louisville (Kentucky), USA, curated by Alice Gray Stites).
- Searching for America (Solo Show, September 4, 2023 – October 26, 2024, Templon New York, Chelsea, Manhattan, New York City (New York), USA).
- Kingdom Of Ends (Solo Show, September 2, 2023 – October 21, 2023, Templon Gallery, Paris, France.
- Bless Our Broken Home (December 2022, Art Basel Miami Beach, Miami Beach Convention Center, Miami (Florida), USA).
- This We Believe (May 4, 2022 – March 18, 2023, Twenty-First Century Museum of Contemporary Art 21c, Durham (North Carolina), USA, curated by Alice Gray Stites).
- It's All Your Fault (Solo Show, September 4, 2021 – October 23, 2021, Templon Gallery, Paris, France.
- The Future Is Old (Solo Show, November 18, 2020 – July 31, 2021, Museum of Modern & Contemporary Art of Amsterdam MOCO Museum, Amsterdam, the Netherlands, curated by Kim Logchies Prins).
- This We Believe (February 1 – December 31, 2020, Twenty-First Century Museum of Contemporary Art 21c, Chicago (Illinois), USA, curated by Alice Gray Stites).
- I Believe In The Promised Land (December 2019, Art Basel Miami Week, Miami (Florida), USA).
- Liberty, Liberty Darling (June 28 – September 15, 2019, Alpes Maritimes Regional Museum Lympia, Vieux Port Nice, curated by Simone Dibo Cohen President of the Mediterranean Union For Modern Art founded in 1946 by Henri Matisse and Pierre Bonnard).
- Not Normal (June 2019, Basel Art Week, Basel, Switzerland).
- HEY! Modern Art & Pop Culture #4 (March 23 – August 2, 2019, Paris City Municipal Museum Halle Saint Pierre, Montmartre Paris, curated by Hey! Art Magazine chief editors Anne de Hey & Julien aka Radio France editor Djubaka).
- Our Meat Is USA Choice. Solo Show. February–March 2019. Paris. ALB AnoukLeBourdiec Gallery.
- The BIC Collection (April 14 – May 27, 2018, Paris City Cultural Institution Centquatre, Paris, curated by Hervé Mikaeloff and Ingrid Pux).
- Back To School – A Portrait Of Youth In Revolt. Solo Show. Art Paris 2017. March–April 2017. Paris. Le Grand Palais Museum.
- Triennale Of Their Times #5 (March–May 2016, Lyon Villeurbanne, The Contemporary Art Institute - IAC, curated by Nathalie Ergino in association with The International Collectors' Association ADIAF - Marcel Duchamp Art Price).
- I Go Alone – Portrait Of A New Lost Generation. Solo Show. Art Paris 2016. March–April 2016. Paris. Le Grand Palais Museum.
- Now Is Our Future (March–April 2016, Paris, Le Carreau Du Temple, art director Philippe Piguet, curated by Drawing Now's current and past selection committee members).
- Until The Quiet Comes. Solo Show. Art Paris 2015. March 2015. Paris. Le Grand Palais Museum.
- The Morning I Was Born Again. Art Paris 2014. March 2014. Paris. Le Grand Palais Museum.
- Endgame. Solo Show. March–May 2013. Paris. ALB AnoukLeBourdiec Gallery.
- Drawing Now (April 2013, Louvre Museum, Paris)
- Humanity Is Overrated. Slick Art Fair. October 2012. Paris. Le Garage.
- God Is Dead. Roxy Rocky. June 2012. Paris. ALB AnoukLeBourdiec Gallery.
