= Kydd =

Kydd may refer to:

- Kydd (surname)
- Kydd (novel), a 2001 novel by Julian Stockwin
- Kydd (rapper), American hip hop artist

== See also ==
- Kidd (disambiguation)
