= Allegheny Airlines Flight 485 =

1971 aviation accident in Connecticut, United States

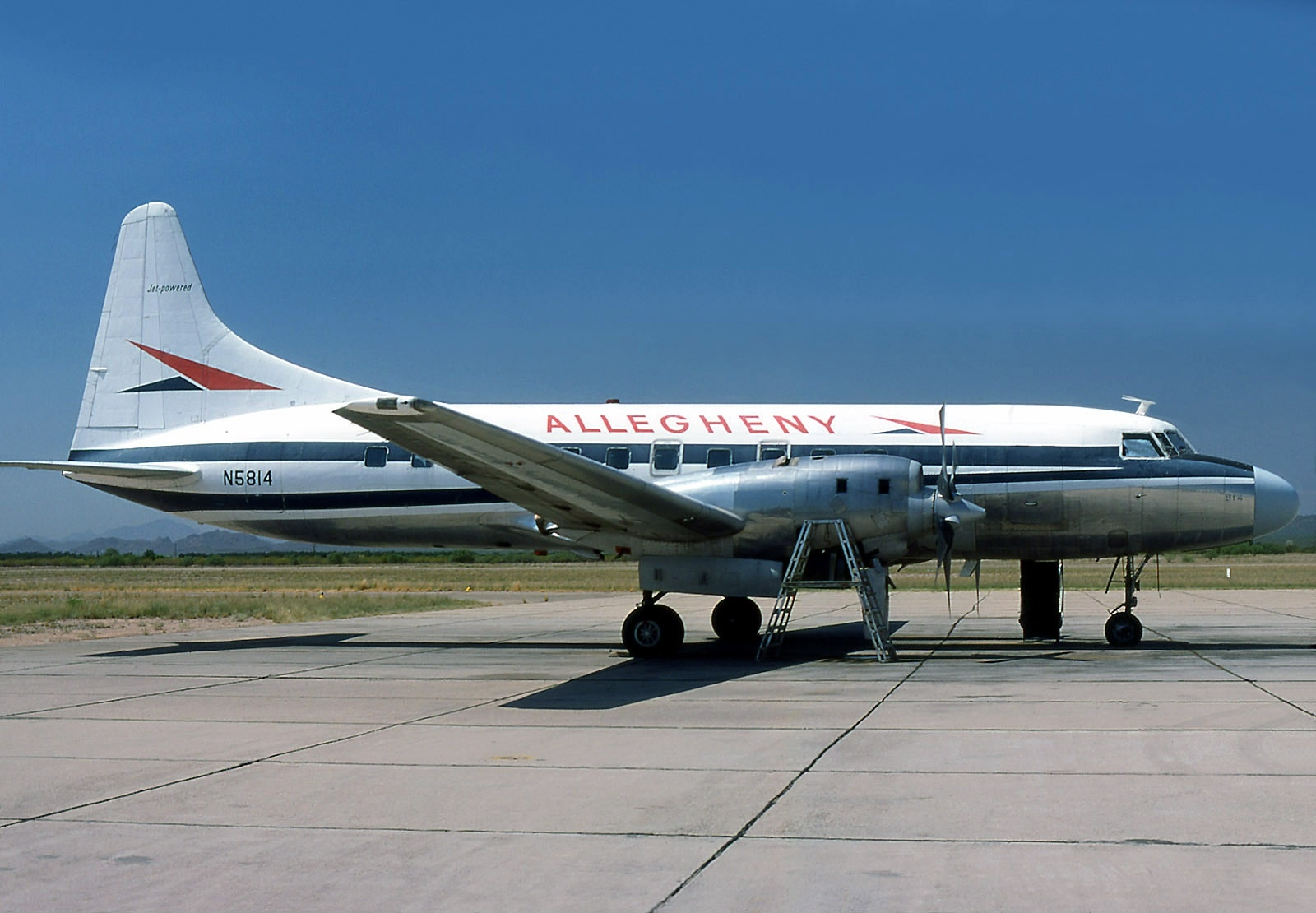
- A Convair CV-580, similar to the aircraft involved in the accident

Accident
- Date: June 7, 1971
- Summary: Pilot error
- Site: Tweed New Haven Regional Airport, New Haven, Connecticut, United States; 41°14′45″N 72°53′15″W

Aircraft
- Aircraft type: Convair CV-580
- Operator: Allegheny Airlines
- Registration: N5832
- Flight origin: Washington, D.C., United States
- 1st stopover: Groton-New London Airport, New London County, Connecticut, United States
- 2nd stopover: Tweed New Haven Regional Airport, New Haven, Connecticut, United States
- 3rd stopover: Philadelphia, Pennsylvania, United States
- Destination: Newport News, Virginia
- Occupants: 31
- Passengers: 28
- Crew: 3
- Fatalities: 28
- Survivors: 3

Allegheny Airlines Flight 485 was a regularly scheduled domestic passenger flight between Washington, D.C. and Newport News, Virginia, United States, with three stop-overs, two in Connecticut and a third in Pennsylvania. On June 7, 1971, the Allegheny Airlines Convair CV-580 operating the flight crashed on approach to Tweed New Haven Regional Airport, New Haven County, Connecticut.

The accident was notable in that all but one person survived the initial impact, however 28 people died in the subsequent fire, after failing to open the emergency exit. Only the first officer and 2 passengers survived. Poor visibility in the cabin, a lack of emergency lighting, unclear emergency door instructions, and a lack of additional crew personnel to assist in evacuation were all cited as factors in the high death toll.

== Aircraft and crew ==
The accident aircraft was a Convair 440 manufactured in 1956. It was purchased by Allegheny Airlines in 1962 from another airline. The aircraft was modified to an Allison Prop Jet Convair CV-580 in 1967. The aircraft's most recent airworthiness certificate was issued in November 1967.

The crew on the accident flight consisted of Captain David Gordon Eastridge, aged 39, and First Officer James Alford Walker, aged 34. The captain had over 12,000 hours of total flight time, including an estimated 3,600 hours in the Convair CV-580. First Officer Walker had over 4,000 hours of total flight time. The flight attendant was Judith L. Manning, aged 27.

== Accident ==
The flight departed Washington D.C. at 7:14 a.m. on an IFR flight plan. Five minutes later, at 7:19 a.m., the crew cancelled the IFR plan, and proceeded directly to New London via visual flight rules. The weather around the airport was foggy, with poor visibility. When approaching Groton-New London Airport, the crew made three missed approaches before successfully landing, approximately one hour behind schedule. Twelve passengers disembarked at Groton. The flight took on 14 new passengers, as well as cargo. The flight departed the gate at approximately 9:33 a.m., bound for New Haven.

At 9:48 a.m., the Tweed New Haven Regional Airport tower controller gave the flight a choice of either Runway 2 or Runway 20 for landing. Flight 485 responded: "O.K., the way it looks we will take two. It will be all right." The flight was cleared for a downwind landing on Runway 2. As noted in the NTSB accident report, downwind landings at Tweed New Haven Regional Airport were prohibited by an Allegheny Airlines company directive. The first officer called out airspeed and descent rate as the flight descended past the minimum descent height of 380 feet, which was verbally acknowledged by the captain, who then told the first officer to "keep a sharp eye out here." Approximately 18 seconds later, with the aircraft still descending, the first officer remarked: "You can't see down through this stuff." The captain responded that he could see the water. The first officer exclaimed that they were "right over the water." No apparent attempt to stop the descent was made. Approximately 3.5 seconds after the first officer's remark, an abrupt voice said "Hold it." The recording ended approximately 2 seconds later.

According to the NTSB accident report, the aircraft struck three adjoining beach cottages at an altitude of approximately 29 feet m.s.l. The local controller noted a fireball and smoke at approximately 9:50 a.m. According to the accident report: "Fire developed immediately upon initial impact."

== Investigation ==
=== Captain Eastridge's decisions ===
Investigators from the National Transportation Safety Board analysed the cockpit voice recorder (CVR) and flight data recorder (FDR) for information as to the cause of the accident, and found it was likely Captain Eastridge made several decisions during the course of the flight which indicated the time of the journey was important to him. Prior to take-off from Washington D.C., Eastridge requested an amended flight plan from the Allegheny Airlines flight dispatcher. He asked the dispatcher to remove the planned refuelling at Groton from the flight itinerary, and asked ground crews at Washington D.C. to add more fuel to the aircraft. Investigators found this decision was likely made in case poor weather at the airport forced him to abandon a landing attempt and proceed directly to New Haven.

When the flight departed from the gate, air traffic control (ATC) gave the aircraft permission to taxi to Runway 15. The flight crew then contacted ATC to request the use of Runway 3, which they were closer to. The NTSB report noted, "Time would have been saved if Runway 3 could have been utilized as it is closer to the company gate and more nearly aligned with the routing to be flown after take-off." ATC approved this runway change, and cleared the aircraft for take-off.

Shortly after take-off, the flight crew received clearance from ATC to initiate a 360 degree turn. Eastwood decided to cancel his instrument flight rules (IFR) flight plan, and elected to fly using visual flight rules (VFR). The NTSB report noted, "The captain obviously was aware that if he proceeded VFR via the most direct course time could have been saved. Evidence indicates that this was his plan."

=== Groton ===
The NTSB noted that "Captain Eastridge carried out the first portion of the flight exactly as planned." Therefore, upon reaching Groton, where the weather was poor, Eastridge elected not to divert to an alternate airport or proceed direct to New Haven, but circle overhead until conditions improved. About 30 minutes after they began circling above the airport one third of the fuel available for holding had been consumed, and Eastridge approached the airport to attempt a landing. "Thinking ahead," the NTSB noted, "about fuel requirements and down-line scheduled operations, the captain attempted to get his airplane onto the ground." But, because of the poor visibility, Eastridge decided that, to see the runway before landing, he would have to descend to 200 feet (61 m) within 1 mile (1.6 km) of the runway, far below the minimum descent altitude of 510 feet (160 m). The NTSB report stated, "He decided to descend to about 200 feet, calculating that sufficient visibility would be available to permit a safe landing. Although such a procedure was not authorized, the captain believed that he could conduct the approach safely."

=== Survivability ===
The NTSB determined the accident was survivable, and the bodies of 15 of the 27 dead passengers were located near the rear service door, which could be manually opened by passengers. The door lock was found in the closed position. Medical examination was undertaken on 26 of the 27, and all had died from chemical asphyxiation or burns. The stewardess had also sustained fractures to the ribs, left clavicle and her third thoracic vertebrae. The accident report stated many of the passengers may have tried to leave the aircraft, but were overcome in doing so.

Several witnesses stated that, when they first arrived at the accident site, they heard voices of people inside the aircraft and that several violent explosions occurred shortly after impact. The female surviving passenger also recalled seeing seven or eight persons up and moving about the cabin and hearing the sound of a male voice calling, "Try to get to the back."

— National Transportation Safety Board, Accident report, 1972

In their analysis of the accident, the NTSB stated that, "with the exception of the captain, who sustained fatal injuries on impact, everyone aboard this flight could have survived if rapid egress from the fire area had been possible or if flame propagation had been retarded." They found that, because of the position of the bodies of the passengers, an unsuccessful attempt had been made to open the rear service door. The instructions, printed on the inside of the door, would have been difficult to read in the smoke.

Investigators concluded the evacuation could have been more successful had another steward been aboard the aircraft. Although two cabin crew are legally required aboard a Convair CV-580, an exemption had been granted to Allegheny Airlines and several other carriers, permitting them to fly with one cabin crew. The Board stated they believed "the possibility for a greater number of survivors would have existed had a second cabin attendant been aboard this flight."

== NTSB recommendations ==
The NTSB made several recommendations to the Federal Aviation Administration. Most notable among these were recommendations regarding fire safety equipment, emergency lighting, and crew instructions to passengers regarding the location of emergency exits and evacuation procedures. The Board suggested that flight attendants physically point to the location of each exit when conducting the pre-flight passenger safety briefing, to increase passenger retention. The Board also pointed to a need for emergency exit lighting, as well as clear, simple instruction for opening emergency exits, calling the instructions present on the accident aircraft "misleading."

The Board also noted the limitations of the aircraft's non-precision approach equipment, suggesting that a more precise instrument landing system could have reduced the likelihood of an accident.

In addition, the Board commented on the need to disassociate pilot compensation from flight punctuality, noting that such an arrangement could "derogate safety."

Finally, the Board called on the Air Line Pilots Association and the Allied Pilots Association to improve their methods of peer review and reporting, in order to find and discipline pilots "who may display any unprofessional (including hazardous) traits as exemplified by this accident."

== Legal Cases ==
The death of passenger Nancy Hollander Feldman led to the lawsuit Feldman v. Allegheny Airlines, Inc., which has been subject to scrutiny regarding its treatment of women in calculating damages for wrongful death actions. Feldman, who had been accepted to The George Washington University Law School prior to her death, had planned to work part-time during the years in which she planned to raise children. The court, however, found that a woman's salary should not be used as a basis for calculating lost wages during the years in which they plan to raise children.

Judge Friendly, in his concurrence, disagreed that Feldman would have likely continued to work once she had children despite her plans to attend law school, stating that "there would be many attractions to which the wife of a successful lawyer might yield: devoting herself to various types of community service, badly needed but unpaid, or to political activity; accompanying her husband on business trips—often these days to far-off foreign countries; making pleasure trips for periods and at times of the year inconsistent with the demands of her job; perhaps, as the years went on, simply taking time off for reflection and enjoyment."
