= Punta Gorda Airport (Florida) =

Airport in Florida, U.S.

Punta Gorda Airport (Formerly Charlotte County Airport)

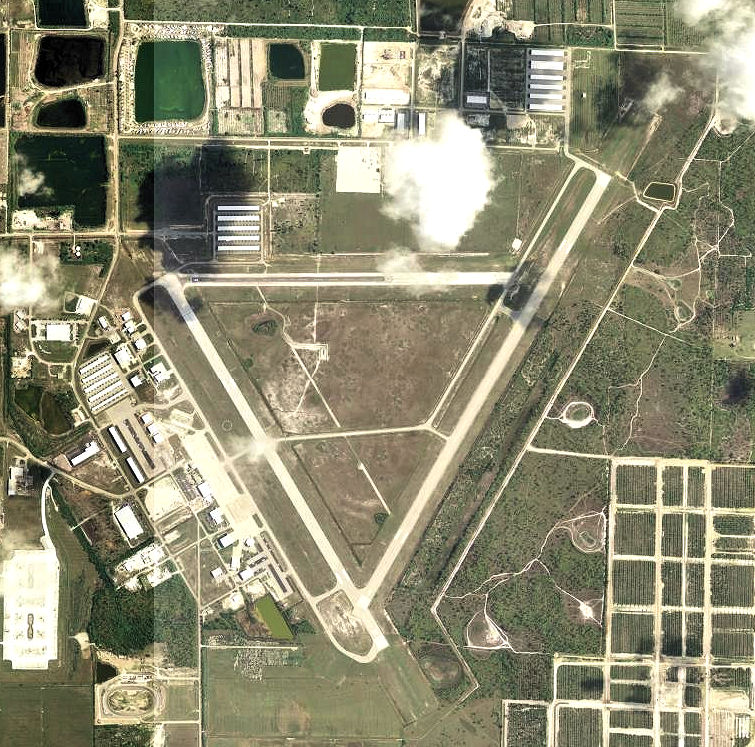
- IATA: PGD; ICAO: KPGD; FAA LID: PGD

Summary
- Airport type: Public
- Owner: Charlotte County Airport Authority
- Serves: Punta Gorda, Florida
- Location: Unincorporated Charlotte County, near Punta Gorda
- Operating base for: Allegiant Air
- Elevation AMSL: 26 ft (7.9 m)
- Coordinates: 26°55′08″N 081°59′27″W
- Website: flypgd.com

Maps
- FAA airport diagram
- Interactive map of Punta Gorda Airport

Runways
Direction	Length		Surface
Direction	ft	m	Surface
04/22	7,193	2,192	Asphalt
15/33	6,286	1,916	Asphalt
09/27	2,636	803	Asphalt

Statistics (2025)
- Aircraft Operations (2024): 131,340
- Based Aircraft (2023): 404
- Total Passengers (2025): ▲2,282,002
- Sources: FAA, BTS, Airport Website

Punta Gorda Airport (IATA: PGD, ICAO: KPGD, FAA LID: PGD) is a public airport three miles east of Punta Gorda, in Charlotte County, Florida. It is owned by the Charlotte County Airport Authority and was formerly called Charlotte County Airport. The airport has mainly been used for general aviation, but has recently seen more scheduled airline service, with flights offered by Allegiant Air to fifty-one destinations.

The airport is home to the Florida International Air Show, an annual event which has featured various military demonstration teams, such as the United States Navy's Flight Demonstration Squadron, the "Blue Angels"; the "U.S. Air Force Thunderbirds"; and the United States Army's "Sky Soldiers" (173rd Airborne Brigade Combat Team) Cobra helicopter team.

The National Plan of Integrated Airport Systems for 2011–2015 categorized it as a primary commercial service airport since it has over 10,000 passenger boardings (enplanements) per year. Federal Aviation Administration records say the airport had 147,698 enplanements in calendar year 2011, an increase from 87,041 in 2010.

== History ==
=== World War II ===
In 1941, the U.S. Army Corps of Engineers built an airfield on the current airport property as a combat pilot training base for the U.S. Army Air Forces' (USAAF) Third Air Force, naming the facility Punta Gorda Army Airfield. By 1944, the base reached its peak in housing 1,000 personnel, including two squadrons of student pilots.

The base initially had forty Curtis P-40 Warhawks assigned, later transitioning to the North American P-51 Mustang. Pursuit (i.e., "fighter") aircraft training in the P-40 and P-51 represented advanced phase training for Army Air Forces fighter pilots prior to their being deployed with USAAF operational units in Europe and the Pacific. Punta Gorda Army Airfield was a subordinate command of 3rd Air Force, 3rd Fighter Command at Drew Field (now Tampa International Airport), and also had C-45 Expeditor and C-47 Skytrain transports assigned for support.

The 27th Service Group, an all-black unit, was moved from MacDill Field in Tampa to provide training for support services to the air combat units.

All base officers and some senior non-commissioned officers lived in Punta Gorda, while all student officers and most enlisted men lived in tent structures on the base. Semi-permanent buildings included an operations headquarters, classrooms, supply building, fire station, dispensary, chapel and the control tower. The base had nose dock hangars, where just the nose of the aircraft was under shelter for repairs.

Following the war, the U.S. Government issued a Deed of Release transferring all of the fixtures and improvements situated on the property to Charlotte County.

=== Airline service ===
Airline service operated at PGD in the 1970s, but it declined in the early 1980s in the aftermath of the Airline Deregulation Act of 1978. Florida Airlines operated flights from PGD to Tampa International Airport and Fort Myers (Page Field) from 1970 to 1976. Pompano Airways began flights from PGD to Fort Lauderdale-Hollywood International Airport in 1981 but the service was discontinued after less than a year. Provincetown-Boston Airlines (PBA) operated service between PGD and Tampa International Airport in the early 1980s on Douglas DC-3 and Cessna 402 aircraft. PBA discontinued service to PGD in 1985, which was the last commercial service at PGD for the next two decades.

Passenger service resumed at PGD in 2007. Skybus Airlines and DayJet began flights at the airport. Skybus ceased operations on April 5, 2008, and DayJet on September 19, 2008. A new passenger terminal, named the Bailey Terminal, opened in 2007 replacing a structure that had been destroyed by Hurricane Charley.

The airport built a control tower in 2012 to accommodate additional commercial passenger service.

Vision Airlines and Direct Air ended all service to PGD in 2012. Shortly after the collapse of Direct Air, Allegiant grew their PGD presence from three to seven cities and started basing aircraft full-time at the airport. Allegiant continues to grow at PGD; by the end of 2015, Allegiant served 29 destinations from PGD.

Frontier Airlines briefly served PGD in late 2016 to mid 2017 offering flights to Philadelphia, Chicago-O'Hare, and Trenton which had been relocated from nearby Southwest Florida International Airport in Fort Myers. After the tourist season of that year, Frontier discontinued service to PGD and shifted the flights back to Fort Myers.

Allegiant Air started service to Punta Gorda in 2014. The airline's first route to PGD was from Portsmouth International Airport at Pease. The airline bought a share of a nearby hotel in early 2024 in an effort to increase tourism and flying into the region, but it sold its share in 2025.

As of mid 2025, the airport is seeking additional low-cost airlines to provide service. The announcement came as Allegiant revealed additional routes through Punta Gorda.

=== Florida International Air Show ===
The airport has been home to the Florida International Air Show since 1981. The Florida International Air Show is a 501(c)(4) nonprofit organization operated wholly by several hundred volunteers that include airport staff. Each year, the Florida International Air Show donates proceeds to various local charities that provide their volunteers for the setup, operations, and breakdown of the event. Through November 2016, the Florida International Air Show has donated $2.9 million to these local working charities throughout its history.

== Facilities ==
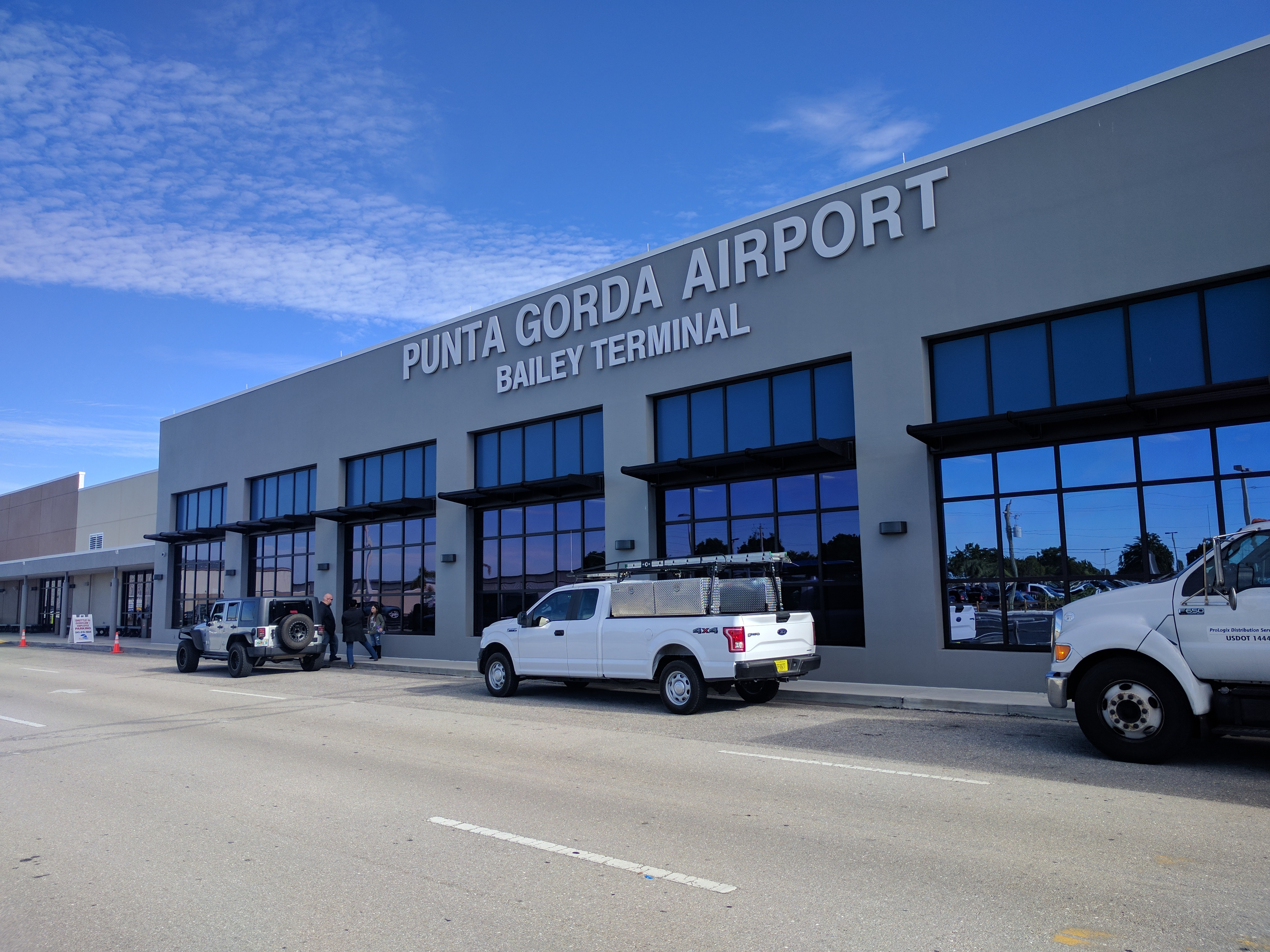
Bailey Terminal building at Punta Gorda Airport

Punta Gorda Airport covers 1,934 acres (783 ha) at an elevation of 26 feet (8 m). It has three asphalt runways: 04/22 is 7,193 by 150 feet (2,192 x 46 m), 15/33 is 6,286 by 150 feet (1,916 x 46 m), and 09/27 is 2,636 by 60 feet (803 x 18 m) and 6 gates.

In 2007, the airport built a new terminal for the growing number of passengers. It was named the Bailey Terminal for the seven Bailey brothers who were from Punta Gorda, and served in World War II and the Korean War.

In the year ending December 31, 2023, the airport had 103,252 aircraft operations, an average of 283 per day: 85% general aviation, 12% airline, 2% military, and 1% air taxi. At the time, there were 404 aircraft based at this airport: 331 single-engine and 36 multi-engine airplanes, 21 jet, 11 helicopter, 4 ultra-light, and 1 glider.

The airport is in the process of expanding including an improved terminal which will increase the airport's gates to 10.

A new Maintenance, Repair, and Overhaul (MRO) facility capable of handling Boeing 737s, Boeing 767s, and various Airbus aircraft is in the final stages of completion as of April 2026. The facility will focus on replacing tires, engines, brakes, and electronics. The MRO is operated by a company with a Miami facility that is looking to expand its footprint and to provide full-time maintenance for commercial airlines and large jets. The facility will work closely with the Charlotte Technical College, which opened a new training facility at the airport in early 2026, to increase the aviation maintenance training pipeline and to close the gap of the number of aviation technicians the industry needs.

== Airlines and destinations ==
Airlines	Destinations
Allegiant Air	Akron/Canton, Albany (NY), Allentown, Appleton, Asheville, Atlantic City, Belleville/St. Louis, Cedar Rapids/Iowa City, Charlotte/Concord, Chattanooga, Chicago–Midway, Chicago/Rockford, Cincinnati, Columbus–Rickenbacker, Dayton, Des Moines, Flint, Fort Wayne, Grand Rapids, Harrisburg, Indianapolis, Kansas City, Knoxville, La Crosse, Lexington, Louisville, Nashville, Newburgh, Niagara Falls, Peoria, Pittsburgh, Portsmouth, Providence, South Bend, Springfield/Branson, Springfield (IL), Toledo, Trenton, Washington–Dulles; Seasonal: Bangor, Boston (begins February 13, 2027), Elmira, Moline/Quad Cities, Omaha, Plattsburgh, Rochester (NY), Sioux Falls, St. Cloud (MN), Syracuse, Traverse City
Sun Country Airlines	Seasonal: Minneapolis/St. Paul

== Statistics ==
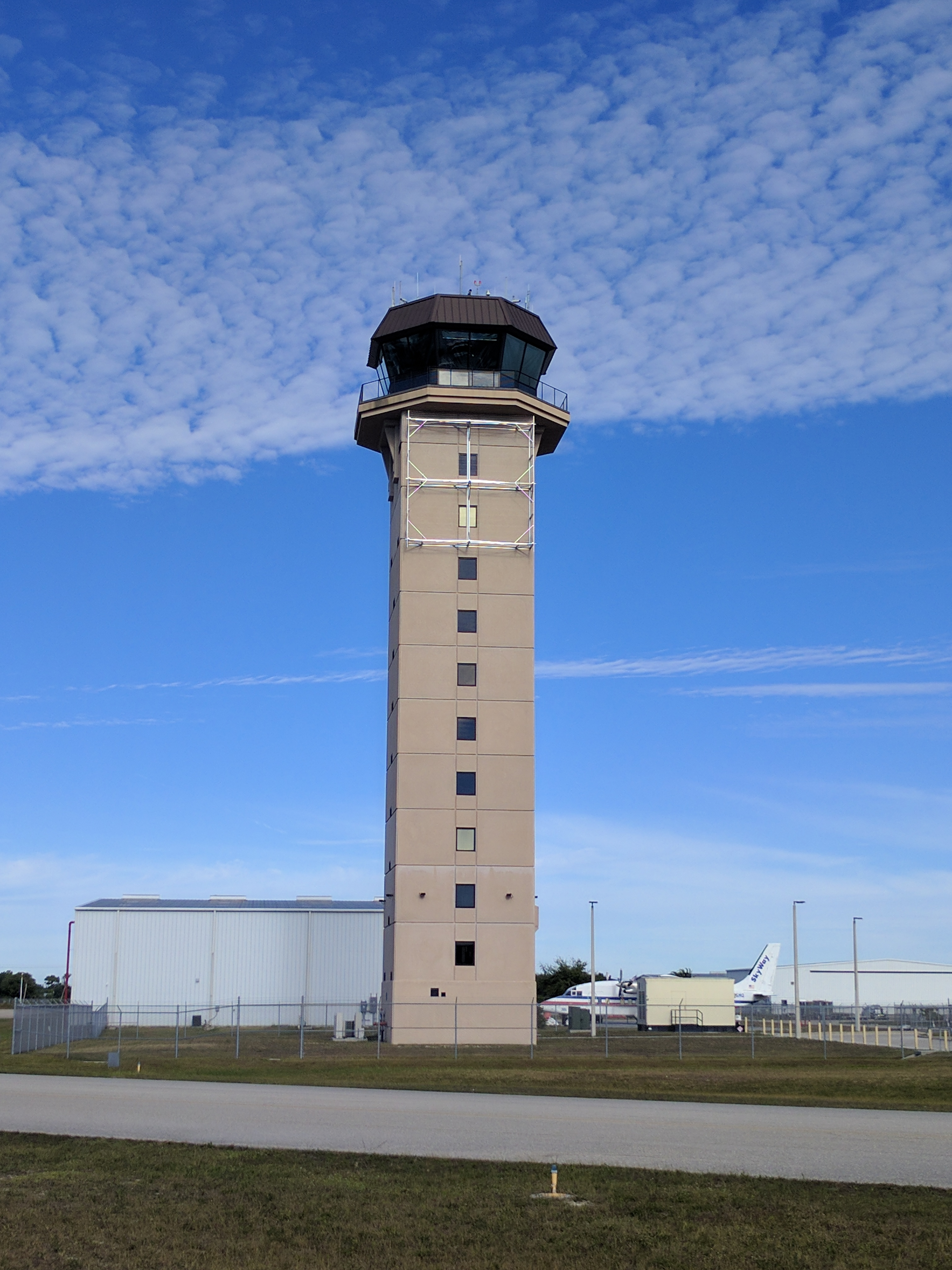
The airport's control tower

The airport had back-to-back record years with 1.9 million passengers in 2024 and nearly 2.3 million in 2025. There were 143,678 aircraft movements in 2025, up from 142,673 in 2024.

=== Top destinations ===
Busiest domestic routes from PGD (February 2025 – January 2026)
Rank	Airport	Passengers	Carriers
1	Grand Rapids, Michigan	58,070	Allegiant
2	Cincinnati, Ohio	53,580	Allegiant
3	Flint, Michigan	53,510	Allegiant
4	Indianapolis, Indiana	44,370	Allegiant
5	Allentown, Pennsylvania	40,620	Allegiant
6	Appleton, Wisconsin	39,450	Allegiant
7	South Bend, Indiana	37,350	Allegiant
8	Portsmouth, New Hampshire	35,800	Allegiant
9	Fort Wayne, Indiana	34,240	Allegiant
10	Chicago/Rockford, Illinois	34,180	Allegiant

=== Annual traffic ===
Annual passenger traffic (enplaned + deplaned) at PGD since 2010
	Passengers
2010	▲182,423
2011	▲291,626
2012	▼219,357
2013	▲333,611
2014	▲628,075
2015	▲836,472
2016	▲1,118,303
2017	▲1,293,337
2018	▲1,577,164
2019	▲1,644,916
2020	▼1,189,681
2021	▲1,569,836
2022	▲1,846,097
2023	▲1,901,819
2024	▲1,925,128
2025	▲2,282,002

== Accidents and incidents ==
- On February 11, 2017, a Quad City Challenger II impacted trees and terrain just after departure from Punta Gorda. The airplane sustained substantial damage and the sole pilot onboard received minor injuries.

== See also ==
- Florida World War II Army Airfields
- List of airports in Florida
