= Concord–Padgett Regional Airport =

Airport serving Charlotte, North Carolina, United States

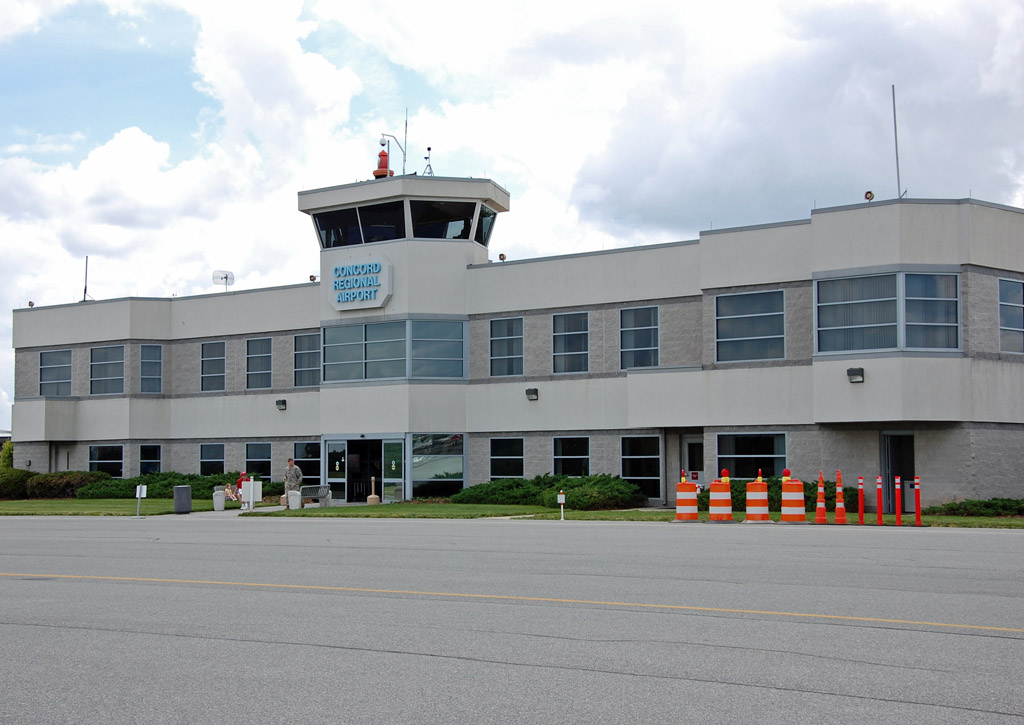
- IATA: USA; ICAO: KJQF; FAA LID: JQF

Summary
- Airport type: Public
- Owner: City of Concord
- Serves: Charlotte metropolitan area
- Location: Concord, North Carolina
- Opened: November 18, 1994; 32 years ago
- Operating base for: Avelo Airlines
- Elevation AMSL: 705 ft (215 m)
- Coordinates: 35°23′16″N 080°42′33″W
- Website: www.concordairportnc.com

Maps
- FAA airport diagram
- Interactive map of Concord–Padgett Regional Airport

Runways
Direction	Length		Surface
Direction	ft	m	Surface
2/20	7,402	2,256	Asphalt

Statistics (2024)
- Aircraft operations: 76,305
- Based aircraft: 233
- Total passengers: 257,000
- Source: Federal Aviation Administration

Concord–Padgett Regional Airport (IATA: USA, ICAO: KJQF, FAA LID: JQF) is a city-owned, public-use airport located 7 nmi (13 km; 8.1 mi) west of the central business district of Concord, a city in Cabarrus County, North Carolina, United States. According to the FAA's National Plan of Integrated Airport Systems for 2009–2013, it is classified as a reliever airport for Charlotte Douglas International Airport.

Although most U.S. airports use the same three-letter location identifier for the FAA and IATA, Concord–Padgett Regional Airport is assigned JQF by the FAA and USA by the IATA. The airport's ICAO identifier is KJQF.

In April 2018, the airport was renamed to honor longtime Mayor of Concord, Scott Padgett. An official ceremony was held on November 18, 2019, for the airport's 25th anniversary.

== Facilities and aircraft ==
Concord–Padgett Regional Airport covers an area of 750 acres (300 ha) at an elevation of 705 feet (215 m) above mean sea level. It has one runway designated 2/20 with an asphalt surface measuring 7,402 by 100 feet (2,256 x 30 m).

For the 12-month period ending May 31, 2022, the airport had 86,654 aircraft operations, an average of 237 per day: 87% general aviation, 9% air taxi, 1% military and 4% scheduled commercial. At that time, there were 233 aircraft based at this airport: 161 single-engine, 29 multi-engine, 35 jet and 8 helicopter.

=== Commercial passenger service ===
On August 20, 2013, Allegiant Air announced it would begin nonstop jet service between Concord and Orlando Sanford International Airport in December 2013. Since then the airline has expanded its nonstop service to several other vacation destinations in Florida as well as announcing new nonstop service to New Orleans. An existing hangar to the left of the main terminal was converted to a separate temporary terminal for this new commercial service. A larger permanent commercial service terminal opened in October 2016. According to FlightAware, Allegiant serves the airport with Airbus A320 jetliners. On March 4, 2020, Allegiant announced Concord would be the airline's 21st operating base, housing two Airbus planes beginning October 7, 2020.

Avelo Airlines also flies to the airport.

== Airlines and destinations ==
Airlines	Destinations
Allegiant Air	Fort Lauderdale, Orlando/Sanford, Punta Gorda (FL), St. Petersburg/Clearwater
Avelo Airlines	Albany, Cleveland, Fort Myers, Indianapolis, New Haven, Orlando, Rochester (NY), San Juan, Tampa; Seasonal: Lakeland, Long Island/Islip

== Statistics ==
=== Top destinations ===
Busiest domestic routes from Concord Regional (September 2025 - August 2026)
Rank	City	Passengers	Airlines	
1	St. Petersburg/Clearwater, Florida	32,160	Allegiant	
2	New Haven, Connecticut	30,580	Avelo	
3	Rochester, New York	27,650	Avelo	Allegiant
4	Orlando/Sanford, Florida	27,640		
5	Fort Lauderdale, Florida	25,890	Allegiant	
6	Long Island/Islip, New York	24,610	Avelo	
7	Punta Gorda, Florida	17,190	Allegiant	
8	Lakeland, Florida	14,120	Avelo	
9	Albany, New York	14,010	Avelo	
10	San Juan, Puerto Rico	12,630	Avelo	

=== Airline market share ===
Largest airlines at USA (September 2025 - August 2026)
Rank	Airline	Passengers	Share
1	Avelo Airlines	269,000	56.64%
2	Allegiant Airlines	206,000	43.36%

== See also ==
- List of airports in North Carolina
