= Lakeland Linder International Airport =

Airport in Lakeland, Florida

Lakeland Linder International Airport Drane Field

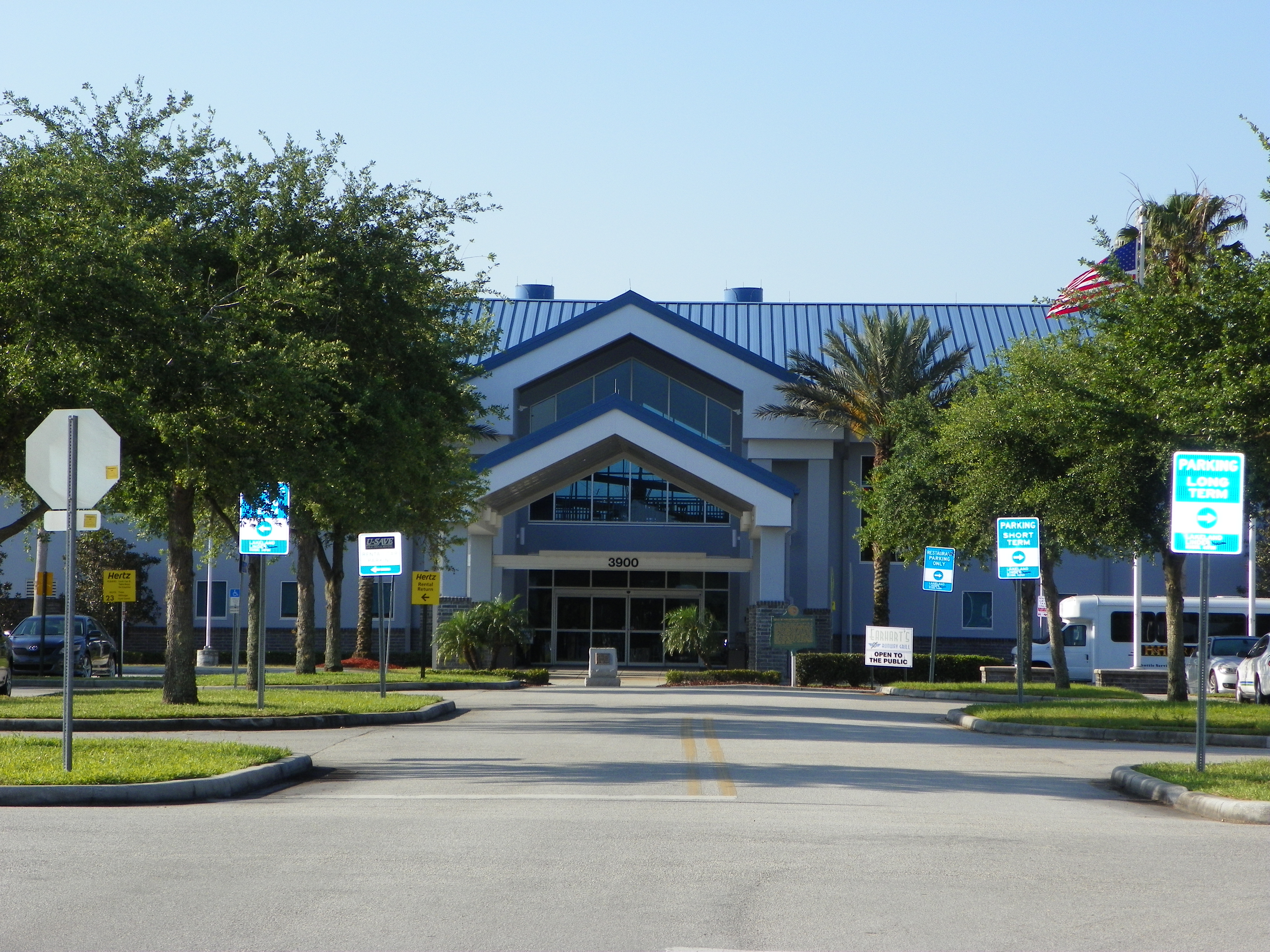
- Main terminal
- IATA: LAL; ICAO: KLAL; FAA LID: LAL

Summary
- Airport type: Public
- Owner: City of Lakeland
- Serves: Lakeland, Florida; Greater Orlando; Tampa Bay Area
- Operating base for: Avelo Airlines
- Time zone: EST (UTC−05:00)
  - Summer (DST): EDT (UTC−04:00)
- Elevation AMSL: 142 ft (43 m)
- Coordinates: 27°59′20″N 082°01′07″W
- Website: http://www.flylakeland.com/

Maps
- FAA airport diagram
- Interactive map of Lakeland Linder International Airport

Runways
Direction	Length		Surface
Direction	ft	m	Surface
10/28	8,500	2,591	Asphalt
5/23	5,000	1,524	Asphalt
8/26	2,208	673	Turf

Statistics (2025)
- Aircraft operations: 158,830
- Based aircraft (2021): 251
- Source: Federal Aviation Administration

Lakeland Linder International Airport (IATA: LAL, ICAO: KLAL, FAA LID: LAL) is a public airport five miles southwest of Lakeland, in Polk County, Florida. The Federal Aviation Administration (FAA) National Plan of Integrated Airport Systems for 2017–2021 categorized it as a national reliever facility for Tampa International Airport. The airport has a Class 1 Federal Aviation Regulation (FAR) Part 139 operating certificate allowing passenger airline flights.

Annually, around March–April, the airport hosts the Sun 'n Fun Aerospace Expo, a six-day fly-in, airshow and aviation convention. It is the second largest such event in the United States after the Experimental Aircraft Association's (EAA) annual "AirVenture" event each summer at Wittman Regional Airport (OSH) in Oshkosh, Wisconsin.

The airport is home to the southeast regional air cargo hub for Amazon Air, which started operations at the airport in July 2020.

== History ==
By the 1950s, Lakeland Municipal Airport (renamed Al Lodwick Field in 1948) was dwindling due to the closure of Lodwick Aircraft, the airport's primary tenant. With the closure of Lodwick Aircraft, the city decided to phase out Lodwick Field as a municipal airport in the summer of 1957 and concentrate its resources on Drane Field in south Lakeland. Drane Field had deteriorated and languished underutilized for many years following the departure of the U.S. Army Air Forces in 1945. After several years of new construction and conversion to a civil airport, it was rededicated as Lakeland Municipal Airport in 1960 with Don Emerson as its first director.

In the 1970s the facility was renamed Lakeland Regional Airport; in the late 1980s it was again renamed as Lakeland Linder Regional Airport for local businessman Paul Scott Linder. Linder had founded Lakeland-based Linder Industrial Machinery, a multimillion-dollar heavy construction machinery company, in 1953. The Chairman of the Lakeland Economic Development Council, Linder was also director of the Florida Council of 100, the Florida Chamber of Commerce and the Florida Council of Economic Education. He was named Florida's Free Enterpriser of the Year in 1988, received a Distinguished Alumnus Award from the University of Florida, and was named 1989 Florida Entrepreneur of the Year. Paul Scott Linder died on November 11, 1990.

In November 2017 Lakeland Linder International Airport opened their first U.S. Customs and Border Protection General Aviation Facility allowing international aircraft with 20 passengers or fewer to land at the field with an approved overflight permit.

In 2021 the airport had 128,576 aircraft operations, averaging 352 per day: 92% general aviation, 2% military, 1% air taxi, and 6% airline. In December 2021, 251 aircraft were based at the airport: 154 single-engine, 31 multi-engine, 60 jet, 3 helicopter, and 3 glider.

== Commercial air service ==
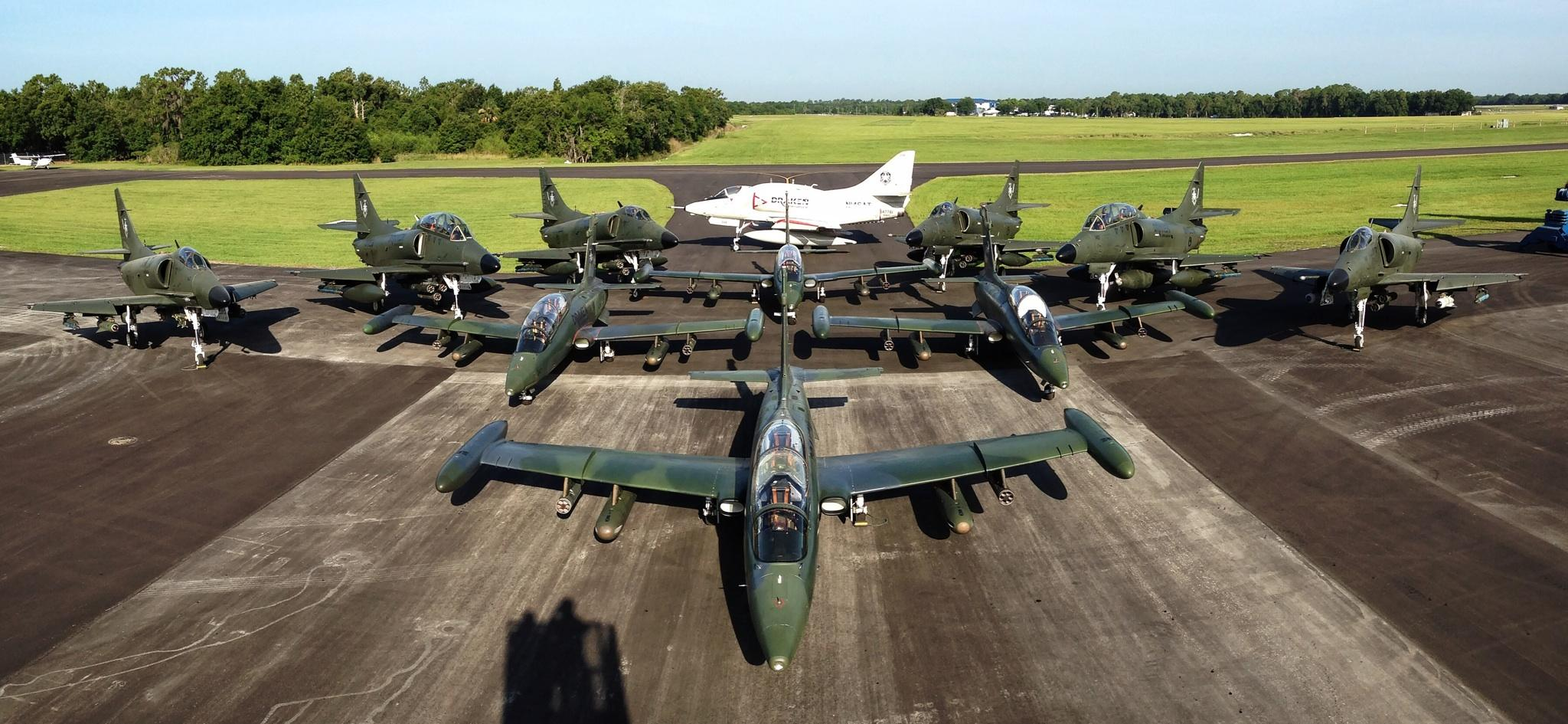
Draken Ramp at LAL

Allegheny Commuter arrived in Lakeland on February 22, 1979. This was after the Airline Deregulation Act of 1978. Chautauqua Airlines of Jamestown, NY provided the service under the Allegheny Commuter affiliation with USAir. The service provided 5 roundtrips a day to Orlando (MCO), using 15-passenger Beech 99s. Due to low demand, the flights ended September 15, 1980.

Delta Connection, operated by Comair on behalf of Delta Air Lines, briefly provided commuter flights to Orlando from December 15, 1987, through early 1988 using Embraer EMB 110 Bandeirante's.

On July 23, 2020, Amazon Air commenced operations following the opening of a brand new 285,000 square foot cargo processing facility.

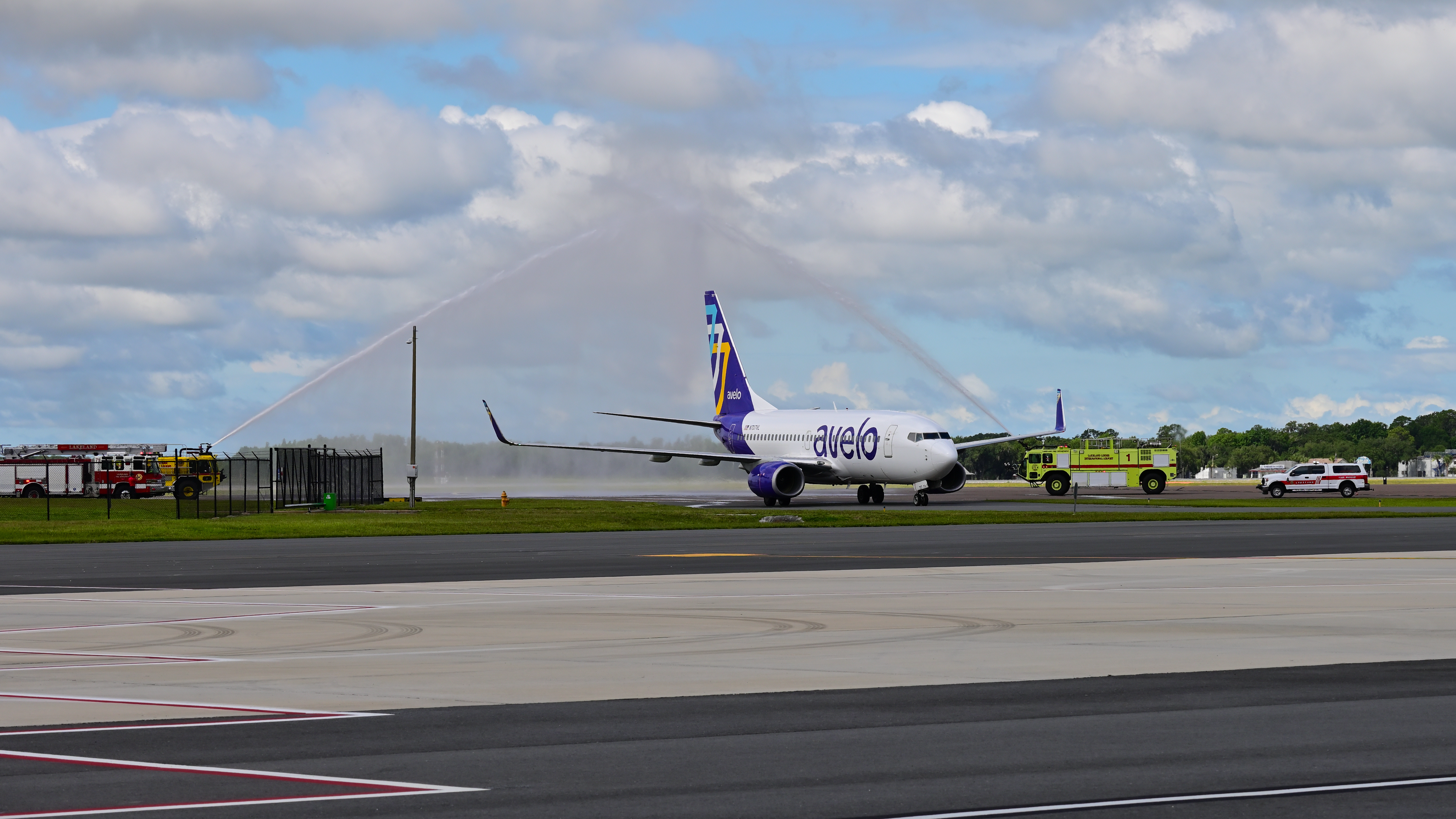
Inaugural Avelo Airlines flight receiving a water cannon salute

On December 18, 2023, the airport announced that Avelo Airlines will commence commercial flights from Lakeland Linder beginning in Spring, 2024. On March 27, 2024, Avelo announced twice-weekly service to Tweed New Haven Airport, starting on June 13, 2024. This is the first commercial passenger service to the airport since Direct Air ended operations in 2012. On July 24, 2024, Avelo announced flights to 7 additional destinations from Lakeland, as well as plans to make the airport an operating base.

== Airlines and destinations ==
=== Passenger ===
Airlines	Destinations
Avelo Airlines	Aguadilla, Atlanta, Grand Rapids, Nashville, New Haven, Rochester (NY), San Juan, Wilmington (DE); Seasonal: Charlotte/Concord, Detroit

=== Cargo ===
Airlines	Destinations	References
Amazon Air	Allentown, Austin, Chicago–O'Hare, Hartford, Houston–Intercontinental, Kansas City, Minneapolis/St. Paul, New Orleans, New York–JFK, Ontario (CA), Phoenix–Sky Harbor, Pittsburgh, Richmond, Sacramento, San Francisco, Spokane, Toledo (OH)	

== Statistics ==
=== Top domestic destinations ===
Busiest domestic routes from LAL (September 2025 – August 2026)
Rank	City	Passengers	Carriers
1	New Haven, Connecticut	24,470	Avelo
2	San Juan, Puerto Rico	21,930	Avelo
3	Rochester, New York	15,430	Avelo
4	Wilmington, Delaware	15,040	Avelo
5	Nashville, Tennessee	14,080	Avelo
6	Charlotte/Concord, North Carolina	13,970	Avelo
7	Grand Rapids, Michigan	7,610	Avelo
8	Atlanta, Georgia	6,720	Avelo
9	Detroit, Michigan	2,730	Avelo
10	Long Island/Islip, New York	710	Avelo

== Federal government, corporate and business aviation ==
In addition, a defense contractor, Draken International, is headquartered at the airport. Draken provides training support to the US Military with their fleet of privately owned tactical aircraft, which includes Douglas A-4 Skyhawk, General Dynamics F-16, Mikoyan-Gurevich MiG-21, Aermacchi MB-339, Aero L-39 Albatros, and Dassault Mirage F1, the Atlas Cheetah, and the Aero L-159 Alca aircraft.

== Facilities ==
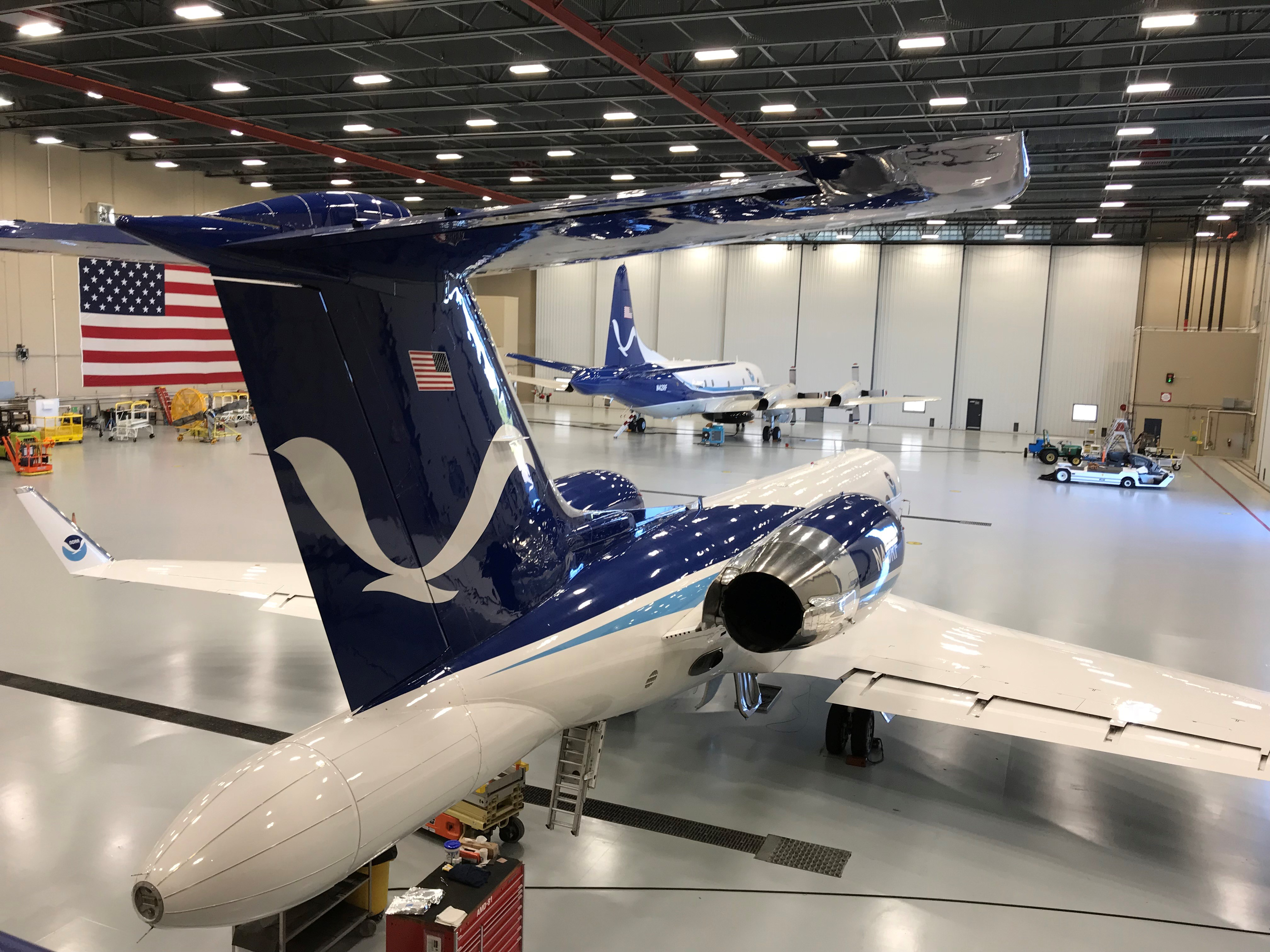
NOAA 42 and NOAA 49 inside NOAA's AOC at LAL

The airport encompasses 1,772 acres (717 hectares) at an elevation of 142 feet (43 m). It has two asphalt runways: 10/28 is 8,500 by 150 feet (2,591 by 46 m) and 5/23 is 5,000 by 150 feet (1,524 by 46 m).

Emergency services are provided by the Lakeland Fire Department, which maintains a 24-hour staffed station on the airfield with a specialized crash truck and crew providing aircraft rescue and firefighting (ARFF) capability. The airport maintains ARFF Index B and is capable of meeting Index C with prior notice.

== See also ==
- List of airports in Florida
- South Lakeland Airport
