= Tweed New Haven Airport =

Airport in Connecticut, United States

Tweed-New Haven Regional Airport

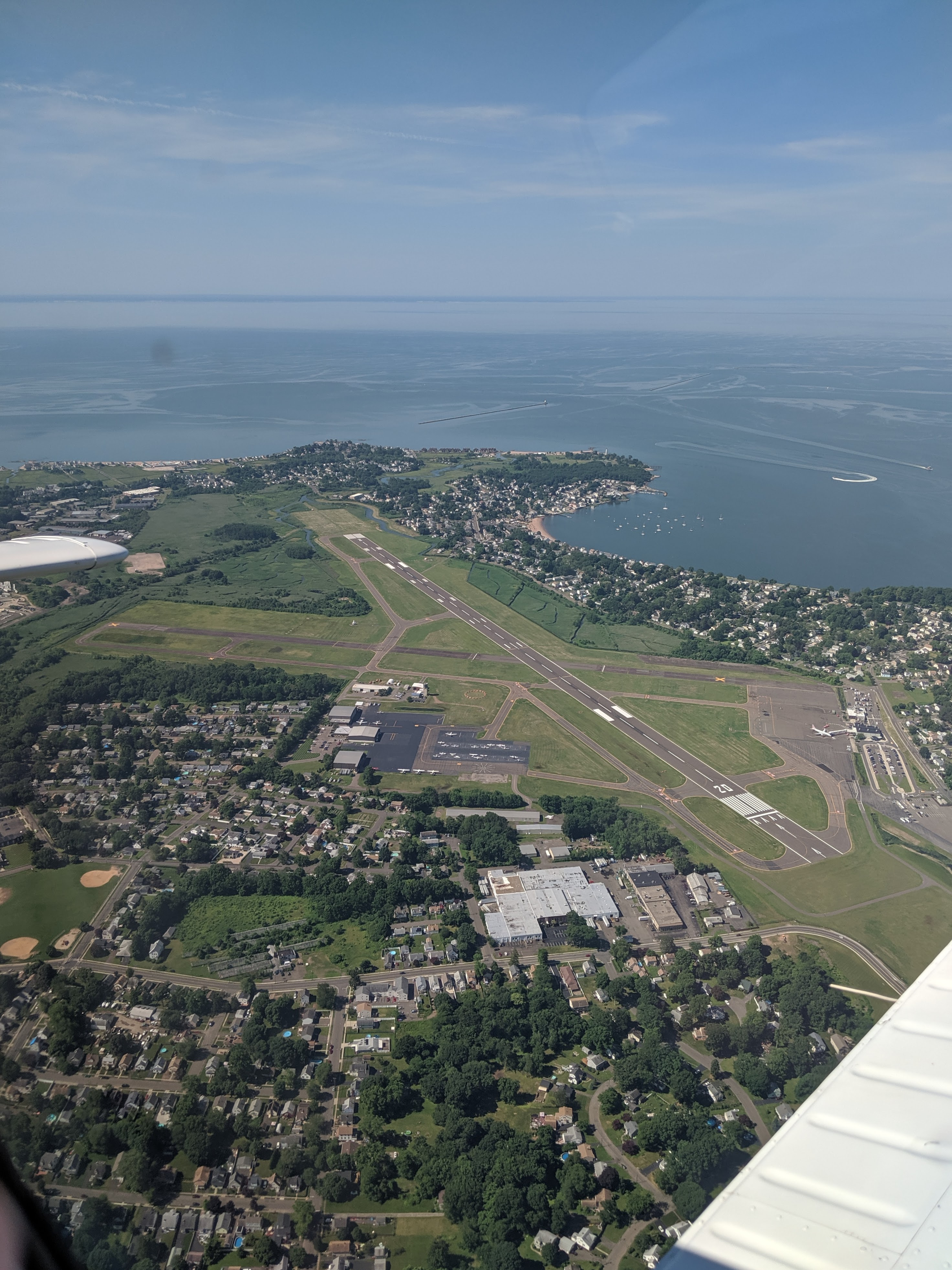
- Tweed-New Haven Airport in 2019
- IATA: HVN; ICAO: KHVN; FAA LID: HVN

Summary
- Airport type: Public
- Owner: City of New Haven
- Operator: Tweed-New Haven Regional Airport Authority
- Serves: New Haven, Connecticut, and the New York metropolitan area
- Location: New Haven County
- Opened: August 29, 1931 (95 years ago)
- Operating base for: Avelo Airlines
- Elevation AMSL: 12 ft (3.7 m)
- Coordinates: 41°15′50″N 072°53′12″W
- Website: flytweed.com

Maps
- FAA airport diagram (2025)
- Interactive map of Tweed-New Haven Regional Airport

Runways
Direction	Length		Surface
Direction	ft	m	Surface
2/20	5,600	1,707	Asphalt

Statistics (2025)
- Passenger volume: 1,467,000
- Departing passengers: 737,000
- Aircraft operations: 34,454
- Based aircraft (2022): 63
- Sources: FAA, BTS

Tweed-New Haven Regional Airport (IATA: HVN, ICAO: KHVN, FAA LID: HVN) is a public airport located three miles southeast of downtown New Haven, in New Haven County, Connecticut, United States. The airport is partly located in the City of New Haven (which owns the airport) and partly in the Town of East Haven. It is one of two airports with regularly scheduled commercial service in Connecticut, the other being Bradley International Airport in Windsor Locks.

Tweed Airport is included in the Federal Aviation Administration (FAA) National Plan of Integrated Airport Systems for 2017–2021, in which it is categorized as a non-hub primary commercial service facility.

== History ==
Ground-breaking ceremonies for New Haven Municipal Airport occurred on November 11, 1929. The facility was later dedicated and opened for traffic on August 29, 1931, as the New Haven Municipal Airport. On June 25, 1961, it was renamed in honor of John H. "Jack" Tweed – its first airport manager.

=== Historical airline service ===
The first airline to serve New Haven was Li-Con Airways, Inc., (Long Island-Connecticut Airways) of Islip, Long Island, New York. That carrier commenced service on November 10, 1933, and provided passenger and airmail service until July 1934. In the fall of 1934, American Airlines began serving New Haven as a stop on flights between New York and Boston and continued service until 1960. The American service was then replaced by Allegheny Airlines and Allegheny Commuter (with the latter being operated by commuter air carriers Suburban Airlines and Pennsylvania Airlines). Allegheny operated British Aircraft Corporation BAC One-Eleven jets into Tweed in the mid-1970s. Eastern Airlines initiated service in 1948 and then left in 1970 due to legal challenges pertaining to a runway extension. Eastern returned briefly from 1972 to 1974 with Boeing 727 and McDonnell Douglas DC-9-30 "Whisperjet" service nonstop to Baltimore-Washington (BWI), Washington-National (DCA) and Boston. The carrier also offered one-stop service to Miami (MIA) and Atlanta (ATL).

==== 1970s and 1980s ====
Fixed base operator (FBO) New Haven Airways started scheduled flights in 1978 and became New Haven's hometown airline, NewAir, in 1980. The airline operated flights to New York's JFK and LaGuardia Airports, Philadelphia, Baltimore/Washington International, and Washington National Airports, with de Havilland Canada DHC-6 Twin Otter, Embraer EMB-110 Bandeirante and Short 360 commuter turboprop aircraft. NewAir ended all service in 1985.

Competing was Pilgrim Airlines based at Groton–New London, to New York–JFK and LaGuardia, Boston, Washington (DCA) on de Havilland Canada Twin Otters and Fokker F27 turboprops. By the mid-1980s the two airlines merged and were then purchased by Hartford-based Business Express Airlines, which initially flew only from Brainard Airport to Boston and Philadelphia. Business Express established a code-sharing relationship with Delta Air Lines and became a Delta Connection feeder airline in 1985.

Ocean Airways, a commuter airline headquartered in New Haven that had been called Monmouth Airlines until 1979, listed New Haven among the points on its route structure from July 1979.

In 1987 Hyannis-based Provincetown-Boston Airlines (PBA), a commuter airline for People Express Airlines (which was subsequently merged into Continental Airlines), began flights to New Haven. PBA operating as Continental Express flew Embraer EMB-110s from Tweed to Continental's hub at Newark and also to Hyannis and Nantucket, Massachusetts.

USAir Express (operated by commuter air carriers PSA, Piedmont, Allegheny) flew to Philadelphia, Pittsburgh, and Washington, DC area airports, utilizing Shorts 360, Dash-8 100/300, Dornier 328 and Beechcraft 1900 turboprop aircraft.

Jet flights from New Haven to Chicago O'Hare Airport started in 1985–86, initially on Air Wisconsin's BAe-146s operating code sharing service as "United Express" on behalf of United Airlines. From 1991 to 1996, United Airlines Boeing 737-300s and 737-500s flew non-stop to O'Hare. Tweed was also served by Atlantic Coast Airlines operating code sharing service as United Express flying Embraer EMB-120 Brasilia turboprops to Washington Dulles Airport.

Continental Express (flown by PBA) service continued with Beechcraft 1900 and ATR 42 turboprops, while Business Express flights were operated with Saab 340 and Beechcraft 1900 turboprops.

Other small air carriers serving New Haven over the years include Ocean Airlines, Astec Air East, East Hampton Aire, Trans International Express, Trans World Express operated by Pocono Airlines on behalf of Trans World Airlines (TWA), and Northwest Airlink operated by Precision Airlines and Northeast Express Regional Airlines on behalf of Northwest Airlines.

==== 1990s ====
By the late 1990s service began to decline to the airport. Business Express service ended, as it put its Saab-340s out of service after its acquisition by AMR Corporation. Continental Express flights ended in 1994, returned in 1995, and then left again on December 17, 1997.

=== 21st century ===
Comair (Delta Connection) began service to HVN in 2004 with three daily flights to Cincinnati-Northern Kentucky International Airport using CRJ-200 aircraft. The airline ceased operations at HVN in January 2006.

Pan Am Clipper Connection, operated by Boston-Maine Airways, began non-stop flights to Baltimore-Washington International Thurgood Marshall Airport, Hanscom Field, and Pease International Airport on March 8, 2007, using 19-seat Jetstream 31 aircraft. Service ended on July 30, 2007.

This left US Airways Express (Piedmont) as the only airline at Tweed, which in 2015 became American Eagle following the American Airlines-US Airways merger.

American Eagle was the only airline serving New Haven year-round. As of November 29, 2017, PSA replaced Piedmont's Dash 8-100 turboprop service with three daily round trips to and from Philadelphia on Canadair CRJ-200, Canadair CRJ-700 and occasionally Canadair CRJ-900 regional jets. Weekly flights to Charlotte Douglas International Airport started on December 22, 2018. Service by Republic Airways to Philadelphia and flying the Embraer E-175 commenced on May 3, 2019. On September 9, 2020, all service was shifted to Charlotte then subsequently canceled one month later on October 7, 2020. American Eagle service resumed on January 5, 2021, after a renewal of the government-subsidized CARES Act created by the ongoing COVID-19 pandemic. Service was shifted back to Philadelphia with one daily flight; however, all service ended once again on September 30, 2021.

Today, the airport is operated by AFCO AvPORTS of Dulles, Virginia – a subsidiary of Goldman Sachs, under contract with the Tweed-New Haven Regional Airport Authority.

On April 18, 2019, Shoreline Aviation – based at the airport – announced a merger with Cape Air. This popular seaplane service was expected to continue connecting HVN with the New York Skyports Seaplane Base in New York City.

On June 14, 2019, Southern Airways Express, a Florida-based-Part 135 commuter carrier, began seasonal nonstop service between Tweed and Nantucket, Massachusetts.

On May 6, 2021, Houston-based low-cost startup Avelo Airlines announced that it would be opening its first East Coast base at Tweed New Haven. The airline operates a fleet of Boeing 737-700 aircraft and initial routes from Tweed would be to Fort Lauderdale, Fort Myers, Orlando, and Tampa beginning on November 3, 2021. Before service even started, two more routes were announced to Sarasota and West Palm Beach. Service began as planned on November 3 with the first flight departing New Haven to Orlando. As of 2026, service had been expanded to 56 cities.

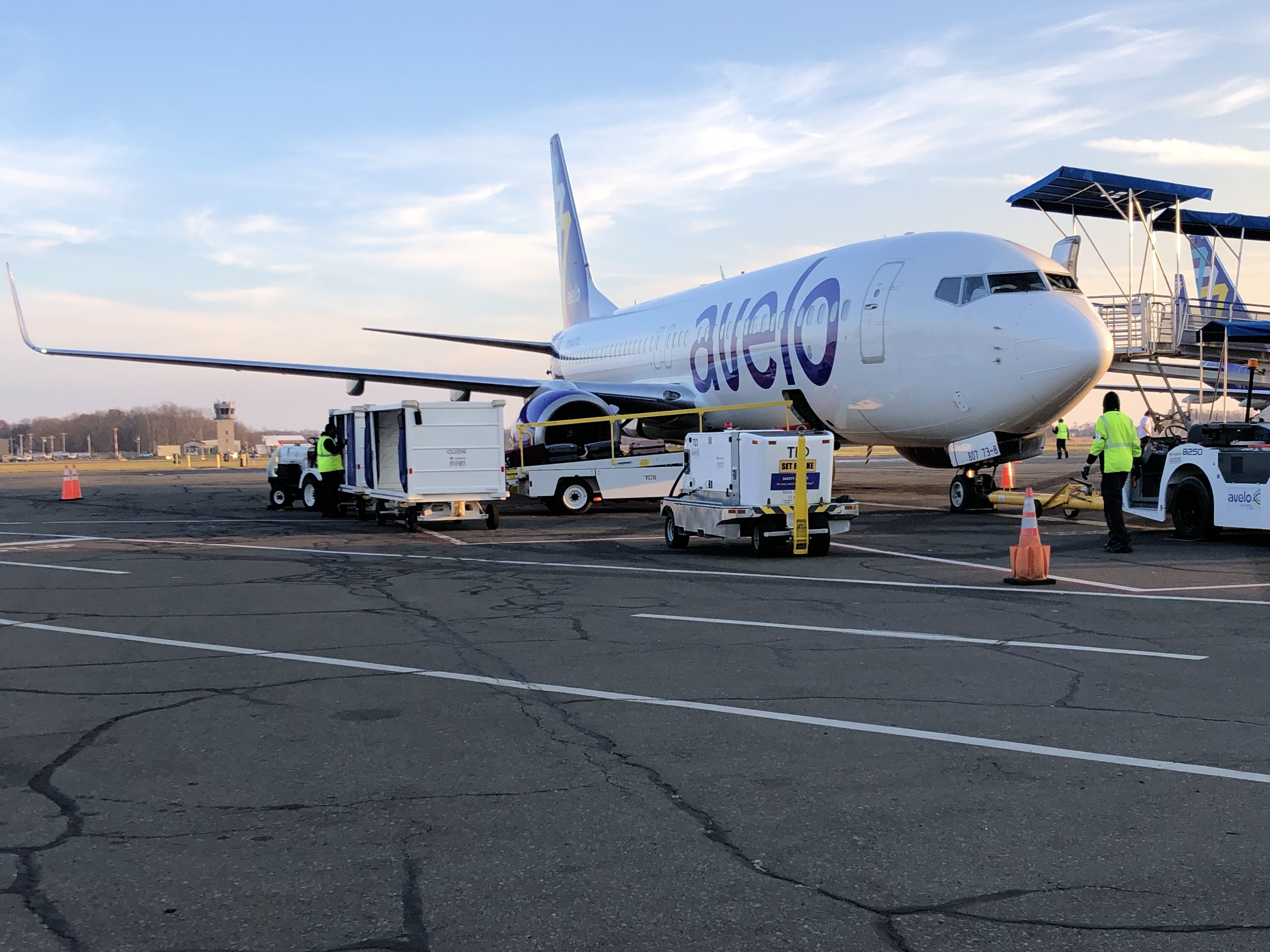
An Avelo Airlines Boeing 737-800 at the airport's terminal in 2023

On August 7, 2024, Breeze Airways announced it will be launching 10 flights in direct competition with Avelo Airlines current routes from New Haven. This will expand operations from Tweed New Haven by adding more flight operations to the already small airport and increase competition. Service for these new routes out of New Haven commenced on December 10. This number increased to 16 on February 7, 2025.

==== Airport expansion ====
In October 2024, the airport received a $4 million grant for the construction of a new, 81,568-square-foot (7,577.9 m^{2}) terminal on its east side. When complete, the new, six-gate terminal will replace the existing one on the west side, built in 1931 and functionally obsolete. The project is expected to cost between $70,000,000 and $100,000,000.

The runway will also be expanded by 975 feet as part of this long-awaited airport expansion project. Additional funding was secured for the expansion project in February 2024, when the airport received a $2 million grant. A federal appeals court upheld the review against local legal challenges, and the physical construction of the new terminal and the runway expansion is scheduled to be ground-broken by late-2026 and to be completed by 2028.

===== Expansion controversy =====
The future of the airport has been the subject of disagreement between the City of New Haven and the Town of East Haven. New Haven has advocated airport runway expansion, which would be required to attract more commercial air service and larger planes. Some groups of local residents have historically been opposed, saying that expansion would negatively affect the local environment and health of New Haven and East Haven residents.

In 2002, the FAA and the State of Connecticut had approved the airport's layout plan which specified the installation of safety overruns and extending the length of Tweed's main runway 02–20. In 2007, the FAA and the State of Connecticut approved the addition of safety overruns to Tweed's main runway. The City of New Haven issued the wetlands and building permits for the project, but officials in East Haven voted to reject the upgrade proposal and deny permits for work on the East Haven (north) side; the Airport Authority and the City of New Haven filed a lawsuit against the Town of East Haven to allow work on the north overrun, and won.

Since the lawsuit, the Airport Authority has completed the work for the $25 million safety overruns on the New Haven (south) side of the airport, as well as the East Haven (north) side.

On March 16, 2009, New Haven and East Haven announced that an agreement had been reached, keeping the main runway at 5,600 feet (1,700 m), with all obstructions in the approach zones to be removed. Departures are to be capped at 30 per day, with a passenger cap of 180,000 boardings per year.

In July 2014, the Tweed New Haven Airport Authority and the City of New Haven sought federal grant money as a part of the Small Community Air Service Development Program. Language within this air service proposal described the airport's hope to lengthen the main runway past 5,600 feet (1,700 m). In the same month, the airport also sought an increase in annually-appropriated State of Connecticut funds, specifically to pave the runway safety areas in order to expand the length of the runway. This legislation was not enacted and federal money for air service development was not granted. In 2015, Mayor Toni Harp of New Haven and Rep. Rosa DeLauro wrote a joint letter to residents pledging their support for runway expansion.

Opposition to the airport runway expansion was strong among some local residents, resulting in the formation of a small grassroots campaign. Tensions flared up at community meetings on May 20 and 21, 2015. East Haven voters and Mayor Joseph A. Maturo, Jr. continued to oppose Tweed's expansion proposals.

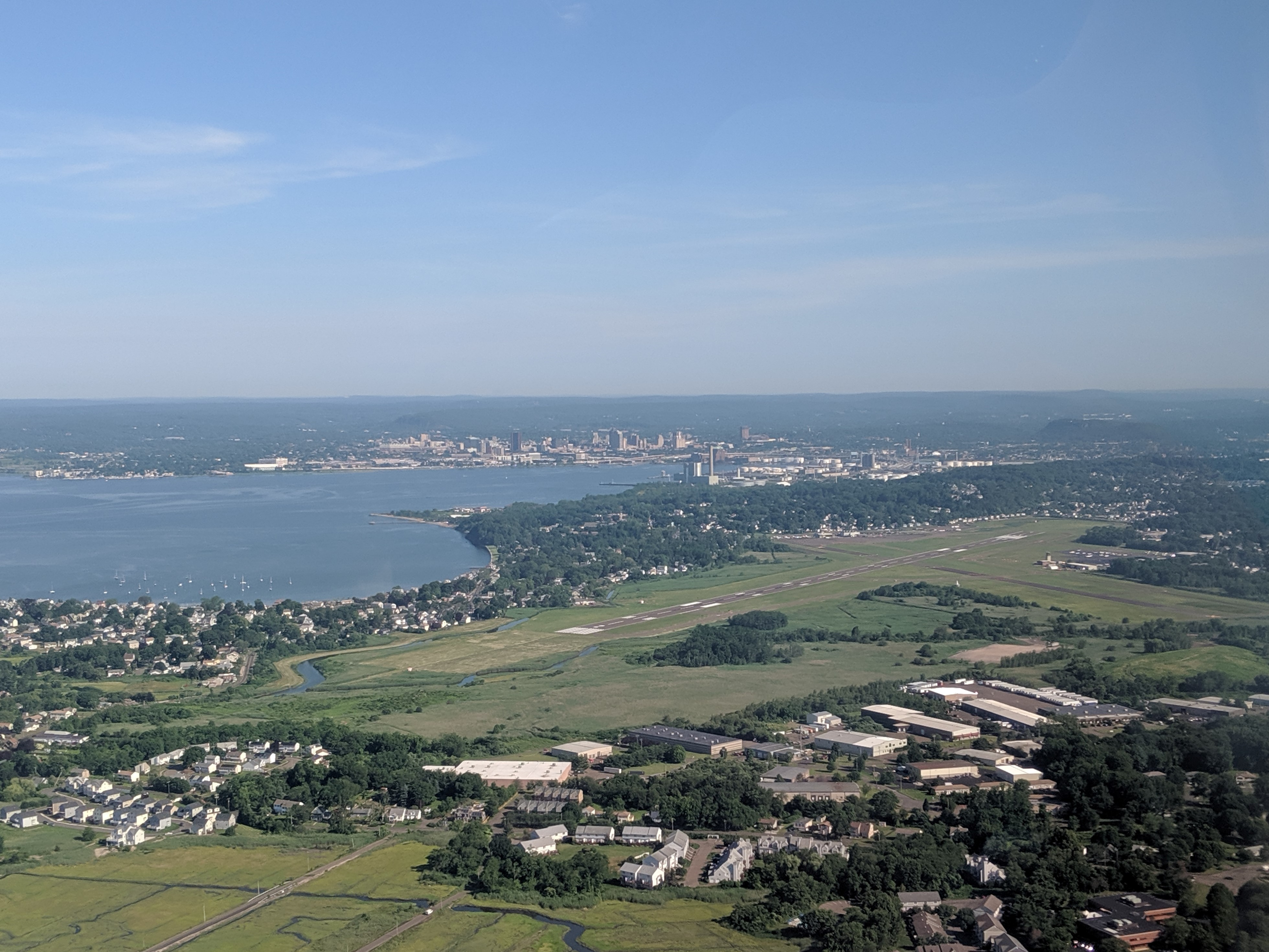
HVN with New Haven in the background in June 2019

In November 2015, the Airport Authority's board of directors voted to sue the State of Connecticut in Federal court.

Tim Larson, former executive director and State Senator for East Hartford, described Tweed as "an airport at a critical juncture. Commercial carriers are interested in servicing the Southern Connecticut market but will not consider coming to Tweed until the runway is lengthened." He added that "American (formerly US Airways), may discontinue our existing service when in the next few years they replace the current Dash-8 aircraft with planes that require a longer runway." Activist residents responded with a new effort against the expansion and a reporting app for noise, health, and quality of life complaints. East Haven Mayor Maturo described the lawsuit as "foolish".

In July 2019, the United States Court of Appeals for the Second Circuit ruled in favor of the airport. In a unanimous opinion, the court ruled that the state statute limiting the length of the runway is preempted by federal law, and is therefore invalid.

In December 2019, Connecticut Attorney General William Tong submitted an appeal to the Supreme Court of the United States seeking a challenge to the runway expansion.

On March 23, 2020, the Supreme Court of the United States declined to hear Connecticut's appeal to the proposed runway expansion. Having exhausted all legal options, the state can no longer prevent the airport from expanding its runway and adding additional services.

On May 6, 2021, Avelo Airlines announced that their new East Coast hub would be located at Tweed and would hire 100 new employees to be based in New Haven. Avelo Airlines announced that flights would begin in the third quarter of 2021. It was also announced that AFCO AvPORTS would build a new terminal on the East Haven side of the airport in addition to expanding the length of the runway. Service began with flights to four destinations in Florida, but it quickly expanded to 14 destinations in eight states. During Avelo's first full year of service, over 340,000 enplanements were recorded, an all-time record for the airport. The growth in passenger totals further highlighted the need for the expansion, with the existing terminal experiencing overcrowding issues and no longer being able to efficiently handle the airport's needs.

The Federal Aviation Administration approved the expansion plans in December 2023. The airport received grants in 2024 for the new terminal's construction. A new framework passed in April 2026 settled long-standing traffic disputes between the neighboring municipalities, and the airport received an additional $11.3 million FAA grant in May 2026 to build the new terminal apron.

== Facilities and aircraft ==
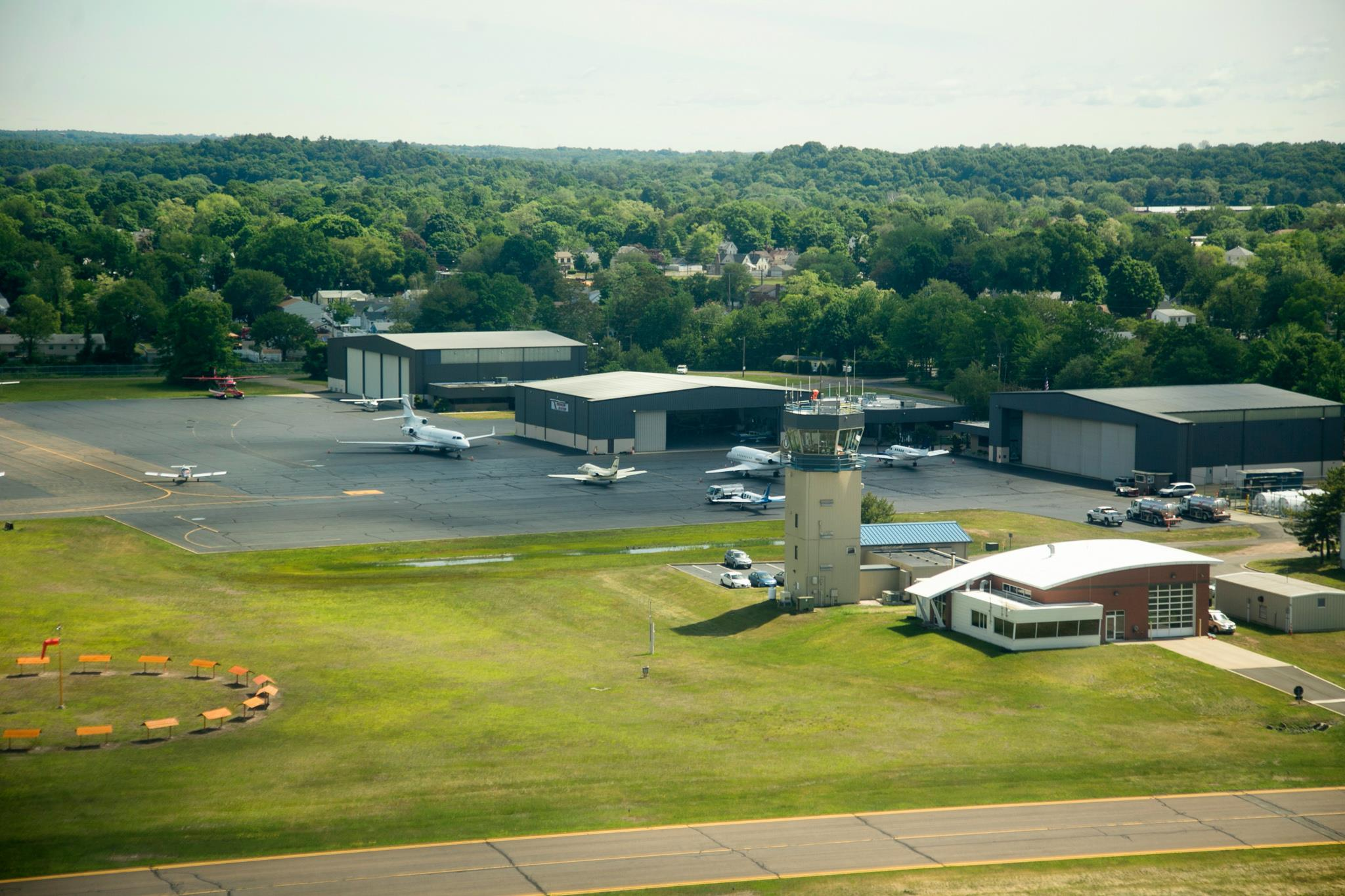
The general aviation facilities on the East Ramp of the airport in the 2010s

Tweed-New Haven Airport covers 394 acres (159 ha) at an elevation of 12 feet (4 m) above mean sea level. It has one asphalt runway: 2/20 is 5,600 by 150 feet (1,707 x 46 m). The airport previously had a crosswind runway, 14/32, which was decommissioned in 2015.

For the 12-month period ending May 31, 2021, the airport served 36,029 aircraft operations, averaging 99 per day: 92% general aviation, 6% air taxi, 1% scheduled commercial, and <1% military. In November 2022, 63 aircraft were then based at this airport: 46 single-engine, 4 multi-engine, and 13 jet.

General aviation operations at the airport are handled by the Fixed-Base Operator, Robinson Aviation, Inc., which has been providing FBO services at the airport since 1989. Services offered include on-site maintenance, flight training and aircraft rental via New Haven Aviation Center, in addition to normal ground handling, fueling, and concierge services. General aviation accounts for the majority of traffic at the airport, catering to corporate, charter, and private-use aircraft of all sizes.

The Connecticut Wing Civil Air Patrol 73rd Minuteman Squadron (NER-CT-073) operates out of the airport.

== Airlines and destinations ==
Airlines	Destinations
Avelo Airlines	Aguadilla, Atlanta, Charlotte/Concord, Cleveland, Dallas/Fort Worth, Daytona Beach, Fort Lauderdale, Fort Myers, Houston–Intercontinental, Indianapolis, Jacksonville (FL), Lakeland, Myrtle Beach, Nashville, Orlando, Raleigh/Durham, San Juan, Sarasota, Tampa, West Palm Beach, Wilmington (NC); Seasonal: Baltimore, Charleston (SC), Chicago–O'Hare, Detroit, Greenville/Spartanburg, Key West, Knoxville, Savannah
Breeze Airways	Charleston (SC), Fort Myers, Jacksonville (FL), Myrtle Beach (begins May 26, 2027), Norfolk, Orlando, Raleigh/Durham, Richmond, Vero Beach, West Palm Beach

== Statistics ==
=== Annual traffic ===
Annual passenger traffic at HVN, 2002–present
Year	Passengers	Year	Passengers	Year	Passengers	Year	Passengers
2002	11,000	2008	68,000	2014	68,000	2020	23,000
2003	31,000	2009	66,000	2015	62,000	2021	57,000
2004	78,000	2010	72,000	2016	57,000	2022	701,000
2005	129,000	2011	80,000	2017	57,000	2023	978,000
2006	76,000	2012	75,000	2018	78,000	2024	1,169,000
2007	75,000	2013	74,000	2019	95,000	2025	1,467,000

=== Carrier shares ===
Carrier shares (June 2025 – May 2026)
1. Avelo, 1,288,000 (88.8%)
2. Breeze, 162,000 (11.2%)

Airline Market Shares (June 2025 – May 2026)
Rank	Airline	Passengers	Market Share
1	Avelo	1,288,000	88.84%
2	Breeze	162,000	11.16%

=== Top destinations ===
Busiest domestic routes from HVN (June 2025 – May 2026)
Rank	Airport	Passengers	Carriers
1	Orlando, Florida	92,060	Avelo, Breeze
2	Fort Lauderdale, Florida	59,990	Avelo
3	Raleigh–Durham, North Carolina	49,890	Avelo, Breeze
4	West Palm Beach, Florida	42,100	Avelo, Breeze
5	Tampa, Florida	39,910	Avelo
6	Fort Myers, Florida	39,720	Avelo, Breeze
7	(Georgia (U.S. state)) Atlanta, Georgia	34,930	Avelo
8	Myrtle Beach, South Carolina	31,290	Avelo
9	Charlotte-Concord, North Carolina	30,960	Avelo
10	Nashville, Tennessee	26,710	Avelo

== Ground transportation ==
=== Highway access ===
The airport can be accessed from the Connecticut Turnpike's (I-95's) northbound Exit 50 onto Townsend Avenue, and southbound Exit 51 onto Frontage Road. More directly, the terminal is accessed by taking Fort Hale Road to Burr Street.

=== Public transportation ===
Bus connections
System	Route(s)	Refs
CT Transit New Haven	206	

CT Transit bus route 206 provides regular daily service between the passenger terminal and East Chapel Street in Downtown New Haven. The route also provides access to New Haven–State Street train station, which is served by Amtrak, CT Rail, and the Metro-North Railroad.

== Accidents and incidents ==
- On March 1, 1958, an American Airlines Convair CV-240-O with eight passengers destined for Bridgeport Airport crashed on the runway after the landing gear was retracted before the aircraft had lifted off. The plane landed on its belly and a small engine fire occurred. There were no injuries.
- On June 7, 1971, a Convair 580 operating as Allegheny Airlines Flight 485 with 30 passengers arriving from Groton-New London Airport crashed, striking cottages 4,890 feet (1,490 m) from the runway. 28 occupants died. It was blamed on pilot error.
- On October 16, 1974, a Cessna Citation owned by Asplundh Tree Expert Company crashed during takeoff after both engines ingested seagulls, causing a loss of power. The crew aborted takeoff, but the aircraft overran the runway, broke through a fence, and came to rest in a creek.
- On January 7, 2011, a Bombardier Dash 8-100, operating as Piedmont Airlines flight 4507 from Philadelphia International Airport to New Haven was struck by lightning over the Long Island Sound. The captain reported electrical problems and diverted safely to Long Island MacArthur Airport due to better weather. The flight carried 33 passengers who were subsequently bused to New Haven.
- On August 9, 2013, a Rockwell International Turbo Commander 690B from Teterboro Airport in New Jersey crashed into two houses in an East Haven residential neighborhood while on approach to this airport. The impact and the resulting fires destroyed both houses. The incident resulted in the deaths of both people on the plane (the 54-year-old pilot Bill Henningsgaard and his 17-year-old son Maxwell) and two children in one of the homes (13-year-old Sade Brantley and her 1-year-old sister Madisyn Mitchell).
- On February 22, 2017, a single-engine Piper PA-38-112, which was operated by the Connecticut Flight Academy, crashed southeast of Runway 2 in a swamp. This is the second deadliest crash for the flight academy. The student pilot was killed on impact, the flight instructor was listed in critical condition. Eyewitnesses reported seeing the plane nosedive prior to crashing. The NTSB wrapped up its investigation and published a final report on the accident on February 12, 2018. A plastic valve inside the fuel selector was found to have failed in such a position as to restrict fuel flow to the engine, resulting in a total loss of engine power due to fuel starvation. Final blame was shared between the flight school, whom the NTSB said failed to properly address progressive wear and binding of the part, as well as the flight instructor's exceeding the critical angle of attack for the plane while attempting an emergency return to the airport, resulting in an aerodynamic stall/spin.
- On June 30, 2022, at about 5:20 pm, a single-engine prop plane headed from Florida to Massachusetts crashed into the Quinnipiac River after the plane began to experience some engine troubles over New Haven. The two people on board radioed into Tweed New Haven Airport alerting them to the engine troubles. Tweed Airport personnel advised the pilot to attempt to make it to the airport to land the plane. The pilot stated that he would not make it and would ditch into the river. Both persons and a dog were rescued thanks to nearby boaters and bystanders at the Quinnipiac Marina. Fire crews along with other partners were able to safely pull the plane out of the water. The incident is being investigated by the NTSB and FAA.

== See also ==
- Hartford–Brainard Airport (HFD)
- List of airports in Connecticut
- Westover Metropolitan Airport (CEF) – previously marketed by Skybus Airlines as "Hartford (Chicopee, MA)"; however, due to the collapse of Skybus Airlines in April 2008, the passenger terminal is currently empty.
