= Greater Rochester International Airport =

Domestic airport located in Rochester, New York, USA

Frederick Douglass Greater Rochester International Airport

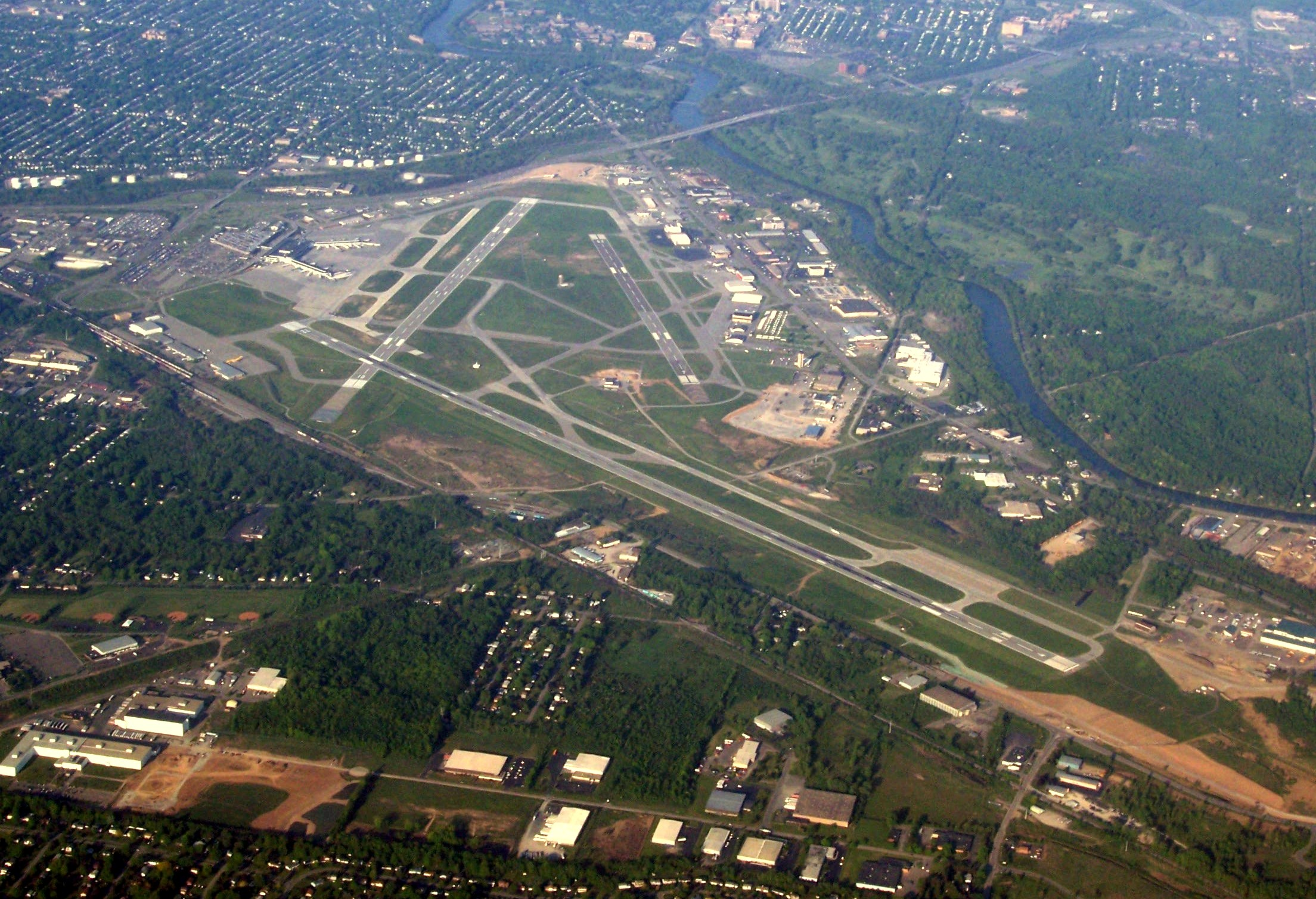
- IATA: ROC; ICAO: KROC; FAA LID: ROC

Summary
- Airport type: Public
- Owner: County of Monroe
- Operator: Monroe County Airport Authority
- Serves: Rochester, New York, U.S.
- Opened: 1919; 107 years ago
- Elevation AMSL: 559 ft (170 m)
- Coordinates: 43°7′8″N 077°40′21″W
- Website: rocairport.com

Maps
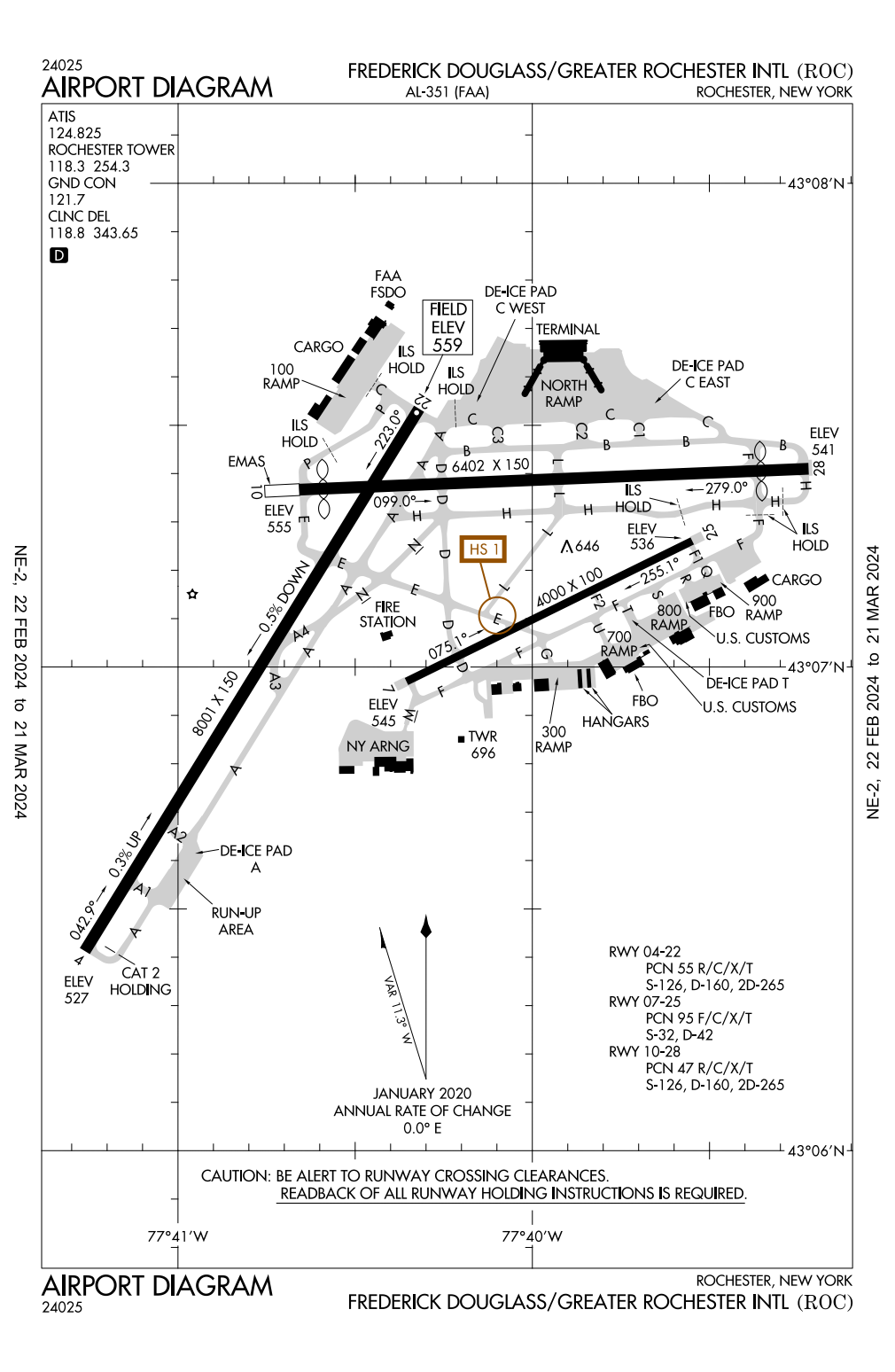
- FAA airport diagram
- Interactive map of Frederick Douglass Greater Rochester International Airport

Runways
Direction	Length		Surface
Direction	ft	m	Surface
04/22	8,001	2,439	Asphalt
07/25	4,000	1,219	Asphalt
10/28	6,401	1,951	Asphalt

Statistics (2025)
- Passengers: 2,761,000
- Sources: airport website, FAA,

Frederick Douglass Greater Rochester International Airport (IATA: ROC, ICAO: KROC, FAA LID: ROC) is a public airport located within the City of Rochester, three miles (4.8 km) southwest of Downtown, in Monroe County, New York, United States. It is owned and operated by Monroe County. The airport is home to the 642nd Aviation Support Battalion, part of the 42nd Infantry Division.

== History ==
=== Early history ===
==== Baker Field ====
A 1910 newspaper article cited "a site near Scottsville Road", along with the Baker Farm in Genesee Valley Park, as possible locations for "airships" to fly from Rochester to Toronto. The Baker Farm was located south of the original Genesee Valley Park, and was donated to the Parks Department of the City of Rochester in 1908. The golf course at Genesee Valley Park was extended to include the Baker Farm in 1914. During World War I, the Baker Farm area of the park, renamed "Baker Field", was used for military purposes. The United States School of Aerial Photography had been created at Kodak Park in Rochester, and Baker Field was the airfield associated with the project. Military use of the field ceased in 1918. Baker Field continued to be used as an airfield for a year or two thereafter, but flood conditions made it unsuitable for airfield use in the long run.

==== Britton Field ====
The site of the Greater Rochester International Airport, originally known as Britton Field, was used for aviation purposes as early as 1919. The Rochester Aircraft Corporation launched its first passenger flight from Britton Field August 18, 1919. The Curtiss JN-4 was piloted by Earl F. Beers. At the time, the only way to get to the field was either by car or by taking the Genesee Street trolley line to the end, and walking the remaining distance. Beers, a Rochester aviation pioneer, urged the local government to purchase Britton Field for a municipal airport. In 1919, Beers offered passenger flights out of Britton Field, charging $1.00 per minute.

Britton Field hosted the United States Flying Circus, consisting of six planes, in September 1919. Dozens of planes landed in Britton Field as part of an aviation race across the United States and back again. The race was won by Lt. Belvin Maynard, "The Flying Parson", who arrived in Rochester, from Buffalo, at 10:30 AM October 18, 1919. His flight from Buffalo's Curtiss Field to Britton Field, a distance of 70 miles, in 22 minutes. He continued to Binghamton before finishing the race at Mineola at 1:50 PM that afternoon. Britton Field was the scene of more competition when a pair of Rochester fliers and two from Syracuse raced between the two cities later in 1919, in a contest sponsored by the Rochester Aero Club and the Syracuse Aero Club. The Rochester newspaper reported that the two Rochester planes beat the combined flying time of the Syracuse pair by 15 seconds.

Purchase of the field as a "municipal aviation station" was authorized by the Rochester City Council in December 1919 The Rochester Aircraft Corporation proposed passenger service out of Britton Field across Lake Ontario to Toronto in 1920. "Young" Sparks, of Bradford, PA., demonstrated the early art of parachuting, by leaping from a plane from 2,100 feet, in an aerial field day at Britton Field in 1921. The United States Army considered Britton Field as a possible site for an airship mooring mast in 1924.

In the 1920s Eastman Kodak Company and the United States Army used Britton Field as landing field for the testing of Kodak's aerial photography experiments. The Fokker monoplane "Josephine Ford", flown by Commander Richard Byrd over the North Pole, was exhibited at Britton Field in October 1926, part of a nationwide tour intended to stimulate interest in aviation. During the Rochester exhibition, an unlicensed pilot, Charles Teleska, crashed his own plane.

The Colonial Air Transport Company, forerunner to American Airlines, developed plans in 1926 to run daytime flights from Boston to Chicago, stopping at Albany, Syracuse, Rochester, Buffalo, and Cleveland. An intersecting route from New York City to Montreal would cross at Albany, allowing for passenger transfers. The new route would carry passengers, mail and merchandise. Night flights were planned as soon as lighted fields were available. The Rochester Flying Club was formed that Fall, intending to keep Britton Field open to all aviation, and to start construction of a hangar and other improvements.

Charles Lindbergh flew The Spirit of St. Louis into Britton Field July 29, 1927, as part of an air tour of New York State. He was greeted by 75,000, according to newspaper reports. He stayed an hour and proceeded on to Buffalo. In the summer of 1927, the Rochester Community Players used Britton Field as one of the backdrops of their silent movie, "Fly Low Jack and The Game". The movie was written, directed, acted and produced by amateurs of the theater company, showcasing the new Cine-Kodak 16mm home movie system.

The first woman in Western New York to receive a pilot's license, Geraldine Grey of Buffalo, trained at Britton Field under the direction of William Dunlap in 1928.

=== Present terminal building ===
==== 1988-1992 expansion project: new terminal ====
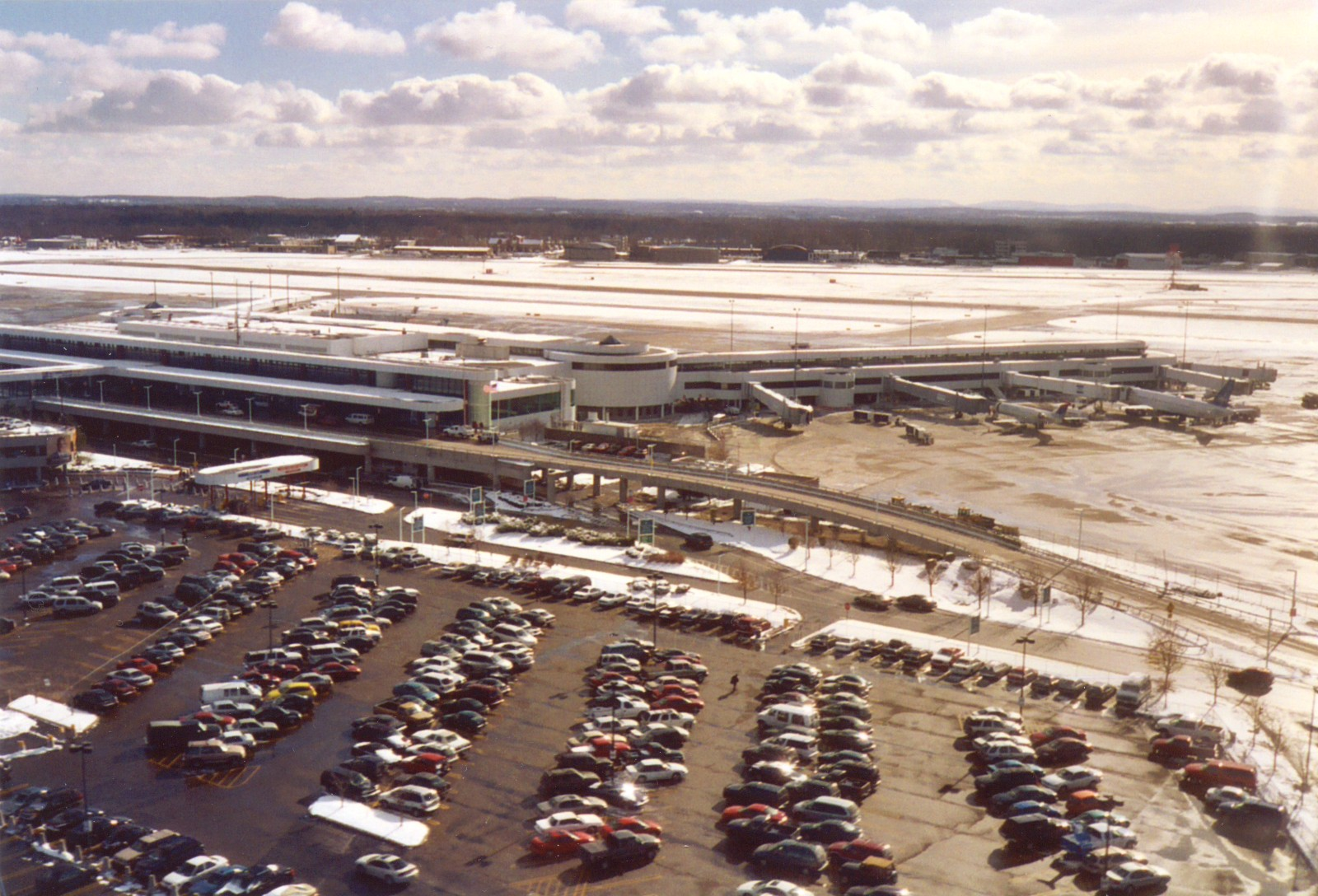
ROC's passenger terminal seen from an approaching aircraft in December 2005

In 1988 Monroe County approved a $109 million plan to replace the terminal with an entirely new two-level facility with a second-level approach road and parking garage. The new facilities were built in stages on the exact site, between 1989 and 1992 and designed by HNTB and built by Wilmorite, Inc.

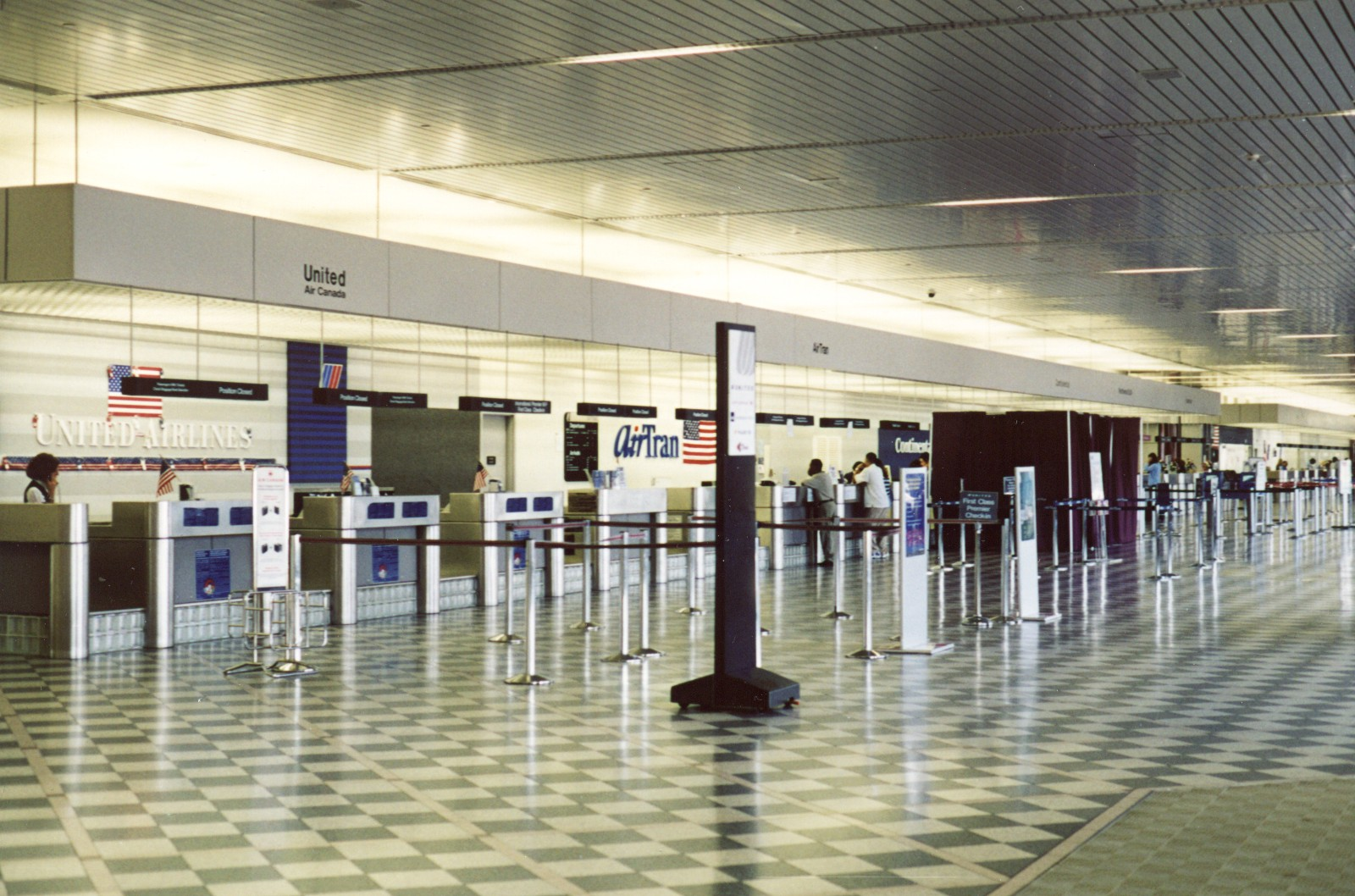
ROC's ticketing lobby, as seen in September 2002

==== 2006-2008 terminal improvements ====
In 2006, Monroe County consolidated the separate security checkpoints at each concourse, to one central security checkpoint. Monroe County argued that this arrangement, although it would close the terminal's large concessions atrium and airfield views to non-passengers, would be more efficient and save money.

=== Airport events at-large ===
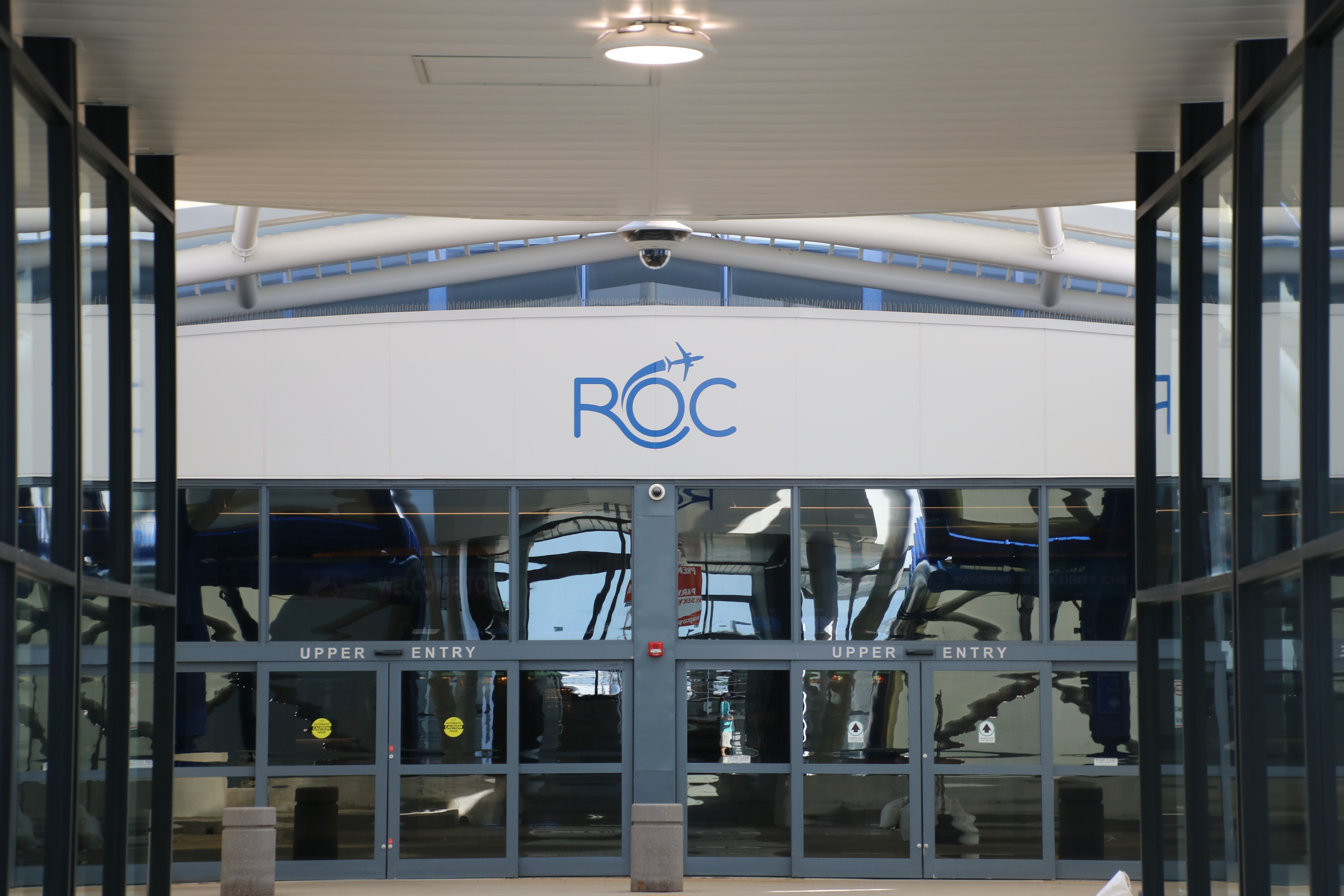

Southwest Airlines replaced AirTran's service at the airport after its acquisition by the airline in 2013.

In 2014, New York State Police established a base for its aviation unit at the Monroe County Regional Traffic Operations Center on airport property, already a station for that agency. At least two helicopters, previously based out of Batavia and Syracuse, were moved to consolidate operations and reduce costs. This unit services Western and Central New York, including Buffalo, Rochester and Syracuse.

In October 2018, Air Canada ended its service to Rochester from Toronto, leaving the airport without any international flights.

In May 2021, Frontier Airlines started new service to Orlando from Rochester. In 2023, Frontier ended all operations at the airport.

=== Renaming efforts ===
On August 12, 2020, Monroe County legislators confirmed that the airport would be renamed in honor of Douglass.

== Airfield ==
The airport covers 1,136 acres (460 ha) at an elevation of 559 feet (170 m). It has three runways - a primary runway, a general aviation runway, and a crosswinds runway:

- 4/22: 8,001 ft × 150 ft (2,439 m × 46 m), asphalt
- 7/25: 4,000 ft × 100 ft (1,219 m × 30 m), asphalt
- 10/28: 6,402 ft × 150 ft (1,951 m × 46 m), asphalt

== Airlines and destinations ==
=== Passenger ===
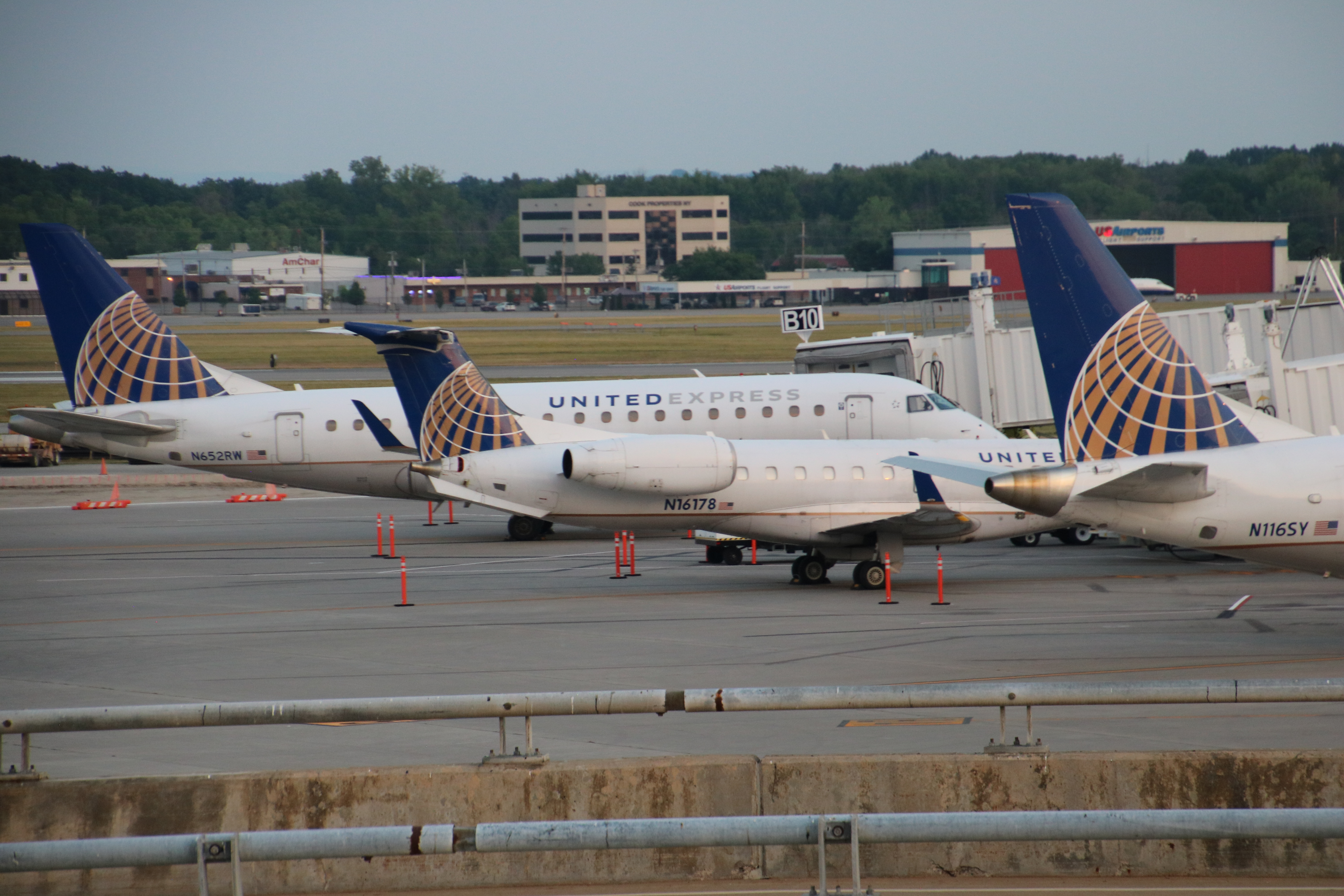
Several United Airlines aircraft lined up at Concourse B

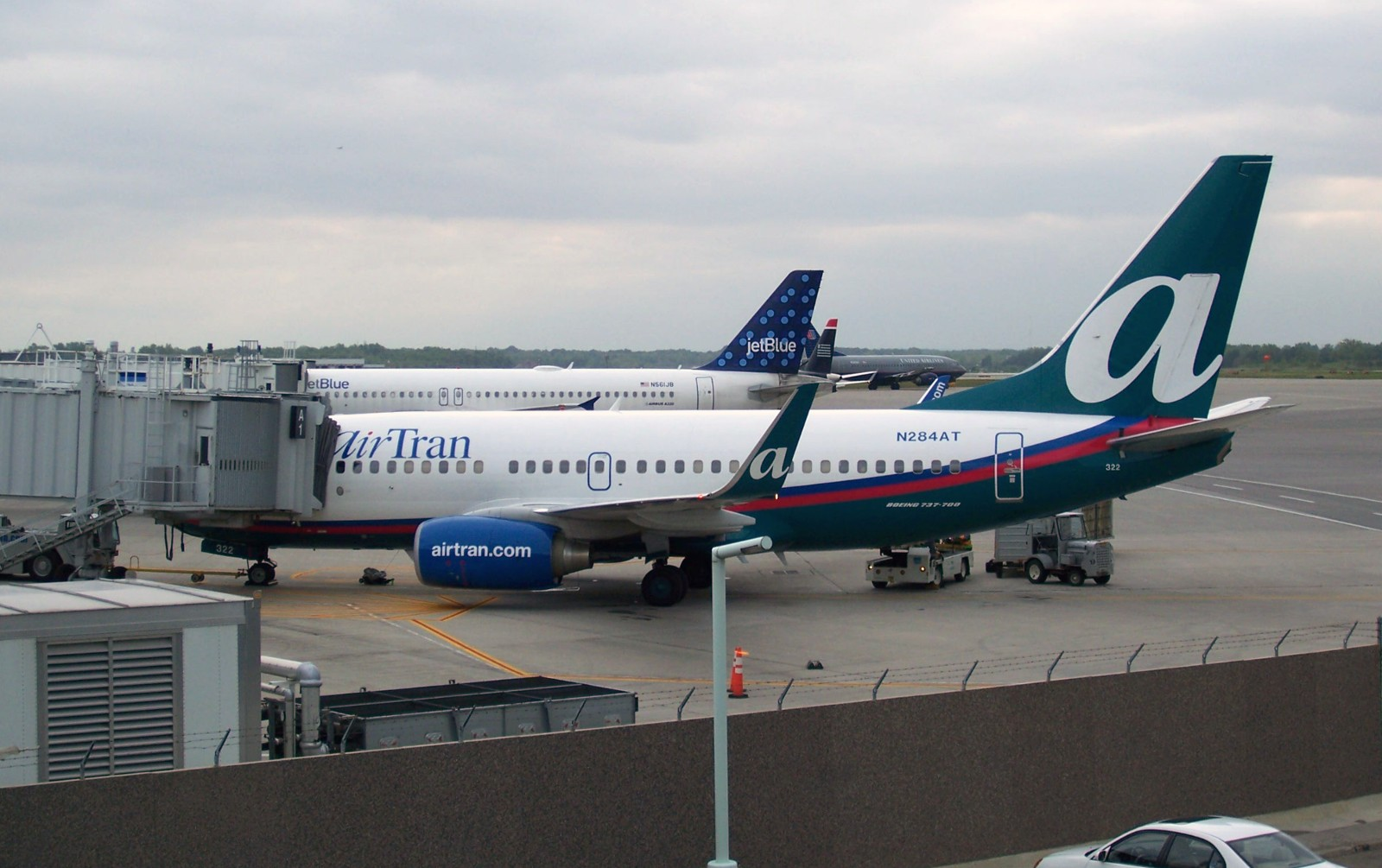
Boeing 737-700 of AirTran Airways and an Airbus A320 of JetBlue Airways at Concourse A

Airlines	Destinations
Allegiant Air	Fort Lauderdale, Sarasota; Seasonal: Punta Gorda (FL)
American Airlines	Charlotte
American Eagle	Boston, Chicago-O'Hare, Miami, Philadelphia, Washington–National
Avelo Airlines	Charlotte/Concord, Lakeland, Raleigh/Durham
Breeze Airways	Charleston (SC), Myrtle Beach, Raleigh/Durham, Tampa; Seasonal: Fort Myers
Delta Air Lines	Atlanta
Delta Connection	Detroit, New York–JFK, New York–LaGuardia
JetBlue	New York–JFK, Orlando
Southwest Airlines	Baltimore, Chicago–Midway, Orlando; Seasonal: Fort Myers, Tampa
United Airlines	Chicago–O'Hare
United Express	Chicago–O'Hare, Newark, Washington–Dulles

Passenger destinations map
Domestic destinations from Greater Rochester International Airport
Red = Year-round destination
Green = Seasonal destination

== Airlines and terminal ==
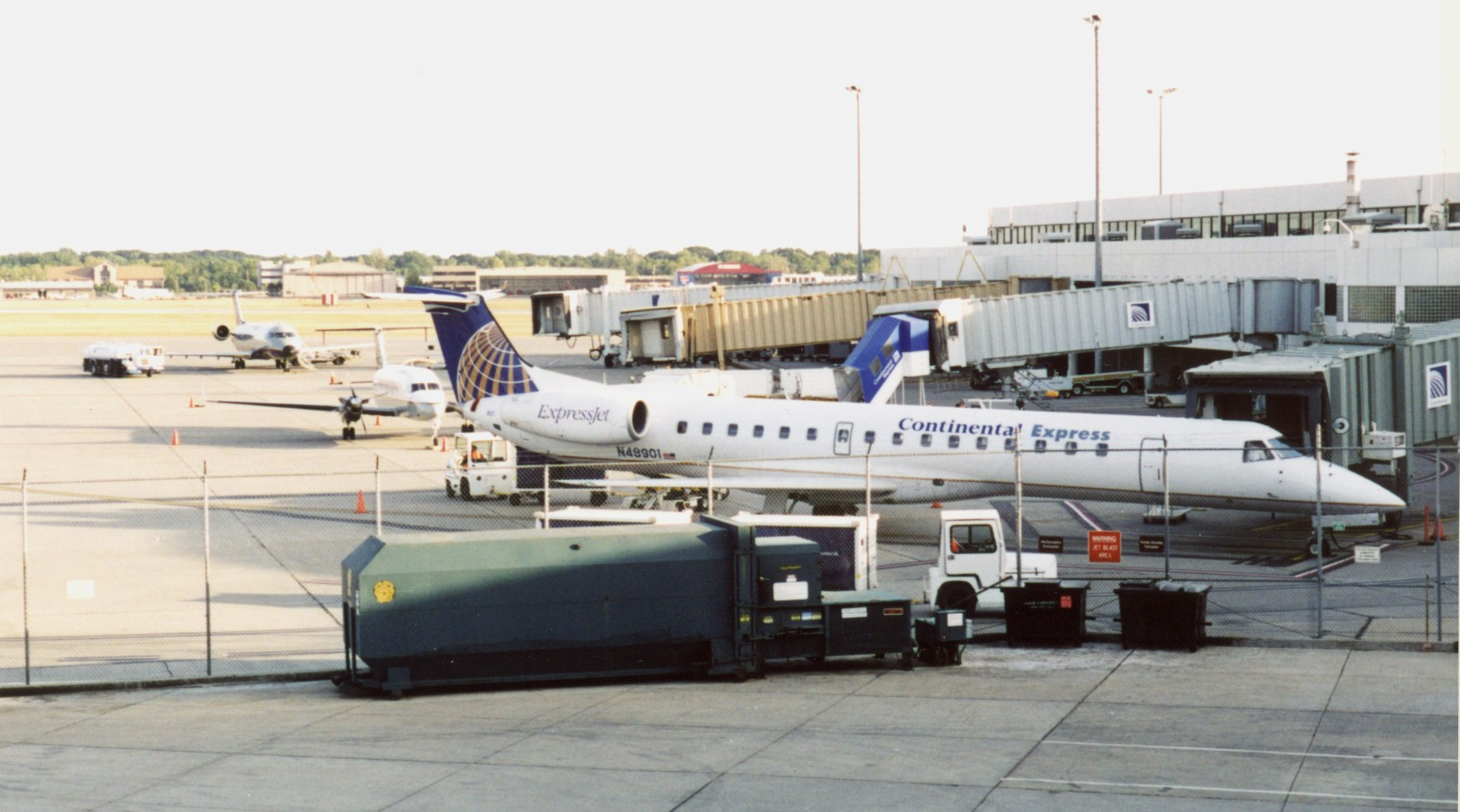
The East of Concourse B at ROC in September 2002

Greater Rochester International Airport has a two concourse terminal in the north of the airfield. The terminal is owned and operated by The Monroe County Airport Authority (MCAA). This terminal has two concourses, each with two stories. The top level of the terminal is home to shops, restaurants, bathrooms, and all gates. The bottom level is home to offices, ground service equipment, and US Customs and Immigration. The terminal has a total of twenty-one gates with ten gates in concourse A and eleven gates in concourse B. Both concourses have been named after somebody famous from Rochester. Concourse A is named after Frederick Douglass and concourse B is named after Susan B. Anthony.

== Cargo ==
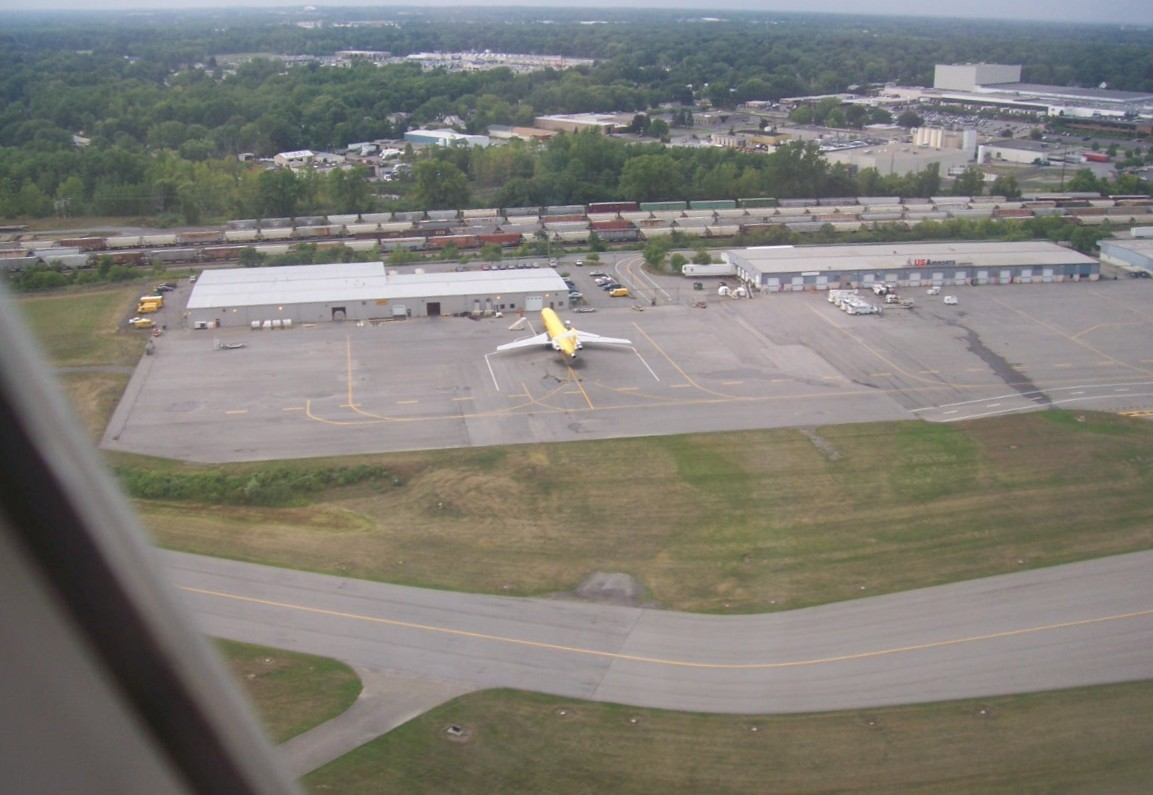
Two buildings of ROC's USAirports cargo terminal in August 2007

Greater Rochester International Airport has a cargo terminal in the northwest corner of the airfield. The terminal is operated by USAirports.

== Statistics ==
=== Top destinations ===
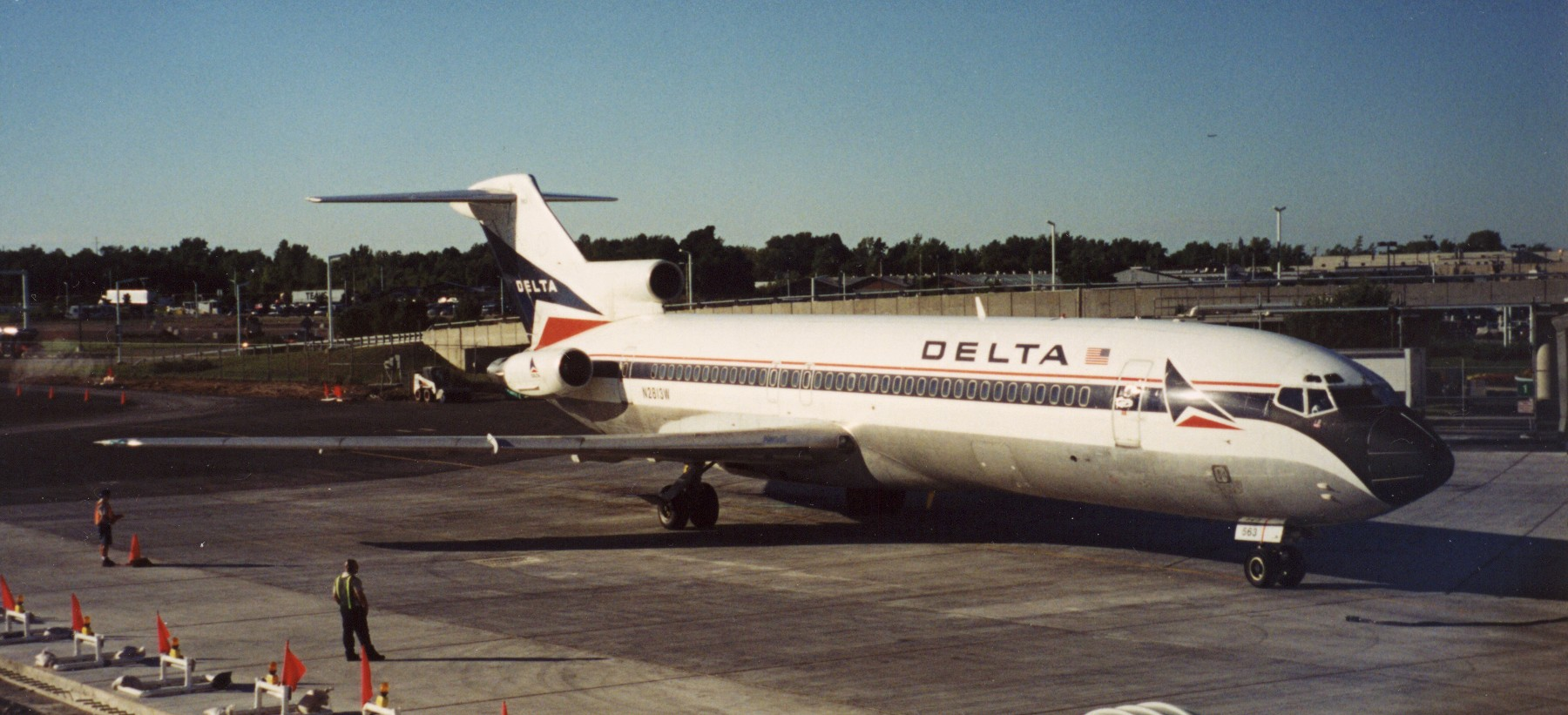
Delta Boeing 727-200 arriving from Hartsfield–Jackson Atlanta International Airport

Busiest domestic routes from ROC (January 2025 - December 2025)
Rank	City	Passengers	Carriers
1	Chicago–O'Hare, Illinois	183,800	American, United
2	Baltimore, Maryland	148,880	Southwest
3	Atlanta, Georgia	140,770	Delta
4	New York–JFK, New York	135,380	Delta, JetBlue
5	Charlotte, North Carolina	109,600	American
6	Detroit, Michigan	83,210	Delta
7	Orlando, Florida	78,220	Southwest, Spirit
8	Washington–Dulles	61,220	United
9	Washington–National	57,820	American
10	New York—LGA, New York	56,150	Delta

=== Airline market share ===
Carrier shares for (January 2025 - December 2025)
Carrier	Passengers (arriving and departing)
Southwest	521,000(18.87%)
Endeavor	320,000(11.58%)
Delta	282,000(10.22%)
American	184,000(6.68%)
United	179,000(6.50%)
Other	1,274,000(46.16%)

=== Annual traffic ===
Year	Total Passengers	% Change
2002	2,055,000	Steady
2003	2,458,000	▲19.61%
2004	2,717,000	▲10.54%
2005	2,889,000	▲6.33%
2006	2,822,000	▼2.32%
2007	2,838,000	▲0.57%
2008	2,679,000	▼5.60%
2009	2,538,000	▼5.26%
2010	2,515,000	▼0.91%
2011	2,364,000	▼6.00%
2012	2,394,000	▲1.27%
2013	2,402,000	▲0.33%
2014	2,339,000	▼2.62%
2015	2,345,000	▲0.26%
2016	2,356,000	▲0.47%
2017	2,391,000	▲1.49%
2018	2,540,000	▲6.23%
2019	2,544,000	▲0.16%
2020	831,000	▼67.33%
2021	1,532,000	▲84.36%
2022	2,316,000	▲51.17%
2023	2,646,000	▲14.25%
2024	2,653,000	▲0.26%
2025	2,761,000	▲4.07%

== General aviation ==
Greater Rochester International Airport has two fixed-base operators supporting general aviation operations. USAirports and Avflight provide hangar, fuel, and maintenance support for general aviation aircraft. Both FBOs fuel and de-ice airline traffic.

== Accidents and incidents ==
- Allegheny Airlines Flight 453 crash-landed on July 9, 1978, while arriving from Boston Logan International Airport. The BAC-111 aircraft was carrying 77 people. According to the NTSB report, the flight landed on Runway 28 at too high a speed, but with capability to reject the landing. The pilots chose to continue the landing, the aircraft skidded off the end of the runway, and its landing gear was sheared off by a ditch. There were no fatalities. The aircraft was written off.

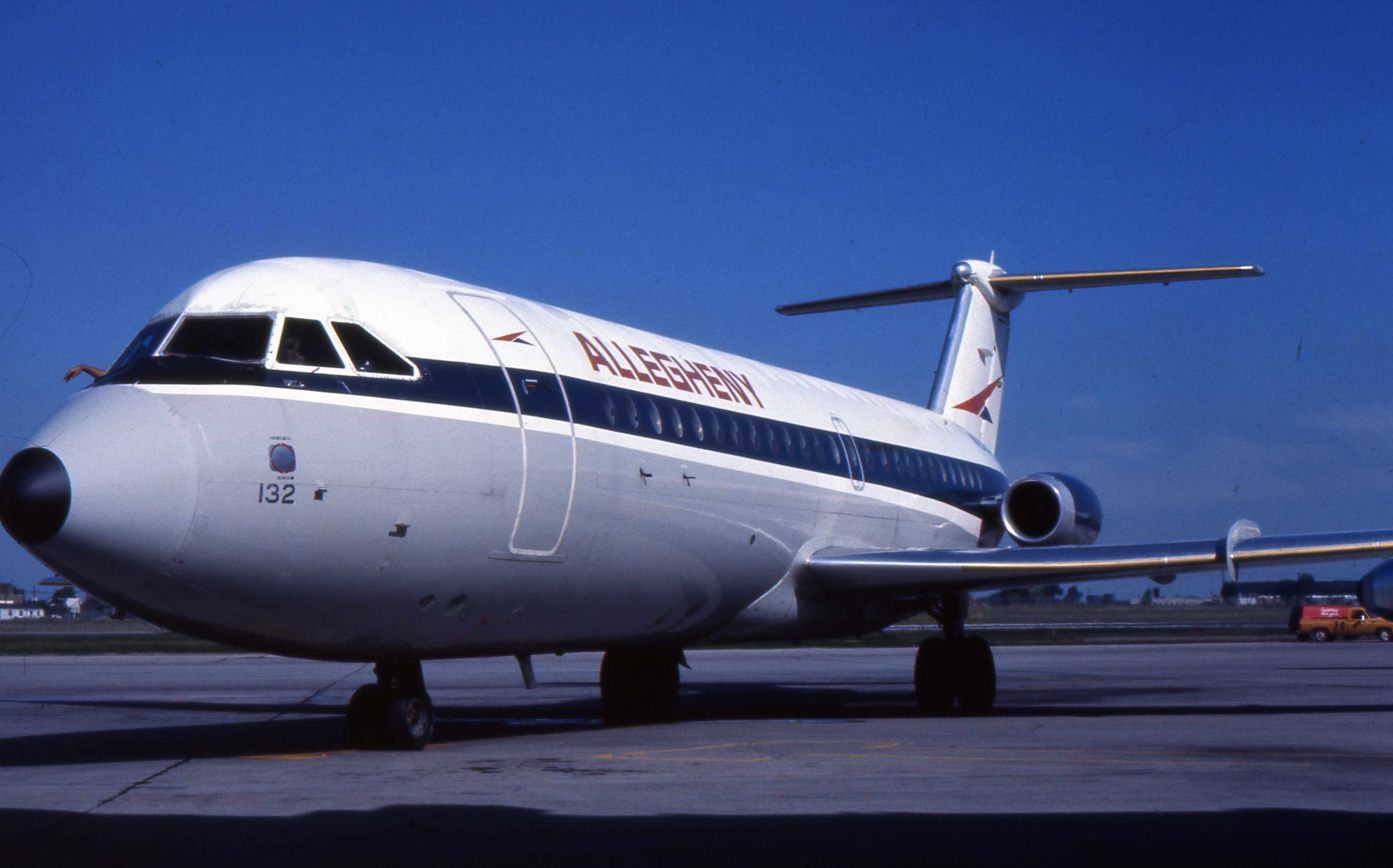
An Allegheny Airlines BAC-111 similar to the one that crashed at the airport

- On December 22, 1984, a Cessna 402B operated by Falcon Air, N8064Q, was destroyed while returning to land after a cargo door had opened during takeoff. The pilot was killed, no passengers were aboard. The NTSB listed the cause of the accident as pilot error including inadequate pre-flight planning, failure to maintain airspeed, pilot attentiveness, and inability to recognize and avoid stall.
- On November 14, 2002, a Cessna 210L, N2444S, was destroyed during a forced landing and collision with terrain while on approach to land. The accident site was 1 mile east of the airport 43°07′08.6″N 077°37′56.8″W. The pilot was killed, no passengers were aboard. The NTSB determined the accident to be 'A loss of engine power for undetermined reasons.'
- On February 16, 2020, a Cessna 172M, with the registration N1126U, operated by Rochester Air Center LLC crashed upon landing at runway 25. No one was injured, but the aircraft suffered substantial damage.
