= List of Avelo Airlines destinations =

This is a list of destinations that Avelo Airlines operates scheduled flights to as of January 2026. This list does not include destinations served by the airline’s former branding of Casino Express Airlines or Xtra Airways. The airline launched flights under its Avelo name in April 2021, initially with domestic flights within the United States, before launching international flights in November 2024. It operates a fleet of Boeing 737 aircraft.

== List ==
Country or territory	City	Airport	Start date	End date	Notes	Refs
Dominican Republic	Punta Cana	Punta Cana International Airport	February 22, 2025	January 21, 2026	Terminated	
Jamaica	Montego Bay	Sangster International Airport	November 16, 2024	January 25, 2026	Terminated	
Mexico	Cancún	Cancún International Airport	November 16, 2024	January 3, 2026	Terminated	
Puerto Rico	Aguadilla	Rafael Hernández Airport	November 18, 2026	Present		
Puerto Rico	San Juan	Luis Muñoz Marín International Airport	November 15, 2023	Present		
United States (Alabama)	Mobile	Mobile Downtown Airport	May 31, 2023	March 4, 2024	Terminated	
United States (Arizona)	Phoenix	Phoenix–Mesa Gateway Airport	May 3, 2021	August 16, 2021	Terminated	
United States (Arizona)	Tucson	Tucson International Airport	December 16, 2021	January 17, 2022	Terminated	
United States (California)	Burbank	Hollywood Burbank Airport	April 28, 2021	October 20, 2025	Terminated	
United States (California)	Eureka	Arcata–Eureka Airport	May 19, 2021	October 20, 2025	Terminated	
United States (California)	Palm Springs	Palm Springs International Airport	November 11, 2022	June 7, 2025	Terminated	
United States (California)	Redding	Redding Municipal Airport	May 20, 2021	August 26, 2024	Terminated	
United States (California)	Ontario	Ontario International Airport	October 10, 2024	March 31, 2025	Terminated	
United States (California)	Santa Rosa	Charles M. Schulz–Sonoma County Airport	April 28, 2021	August 11, 2025	Terminated	
United States (Colorado)	Colorado Springs	Colorado Springs Airport	May 3, 2023	September 1, 2024	Terminated	
United States (Colorado)	Denver	Denver International Airport	December 16, 2026	–	Future	
United States (Colorado)	Fort Collins	Northern Colorado Regional Airport	October 6, 2021	June 24, 2022	Terminated	
United States (Colorado)	Grand Junction	Grand Junction Regional Airport	May 9, 2021	August 16, 2021	Terminated	
United States (Connecticut)	Hartford	Bradley International Airport	November 7, 2024	January 25, 2026	Terminated	
United States (Connecticut)	New Haven	Tweed New Haven Airport	November 3, 2021	Present	Base	
United States (District of Columbia)	Washington, D.C.	Dulles International Airport	July 12, 2024	January 5, 2026	Terminated	
United States (Delaware)	Wilmington	Wilmington Airport	February 1, 2023	Present	Base	
United States (Florida)	Daytona Beach	Daytona Beach International Airport	June 22, 2023	Present		
United States (Florida)	Destin/Fort Walton Beach	Destin–Fort Walton Beach Airport	May 17, 2024	August 31, 2025	Terminated	
United States (Florida)	Fort Lauderdale	Fort Lauderdale–Hollywood International Airport	November 5, 2021	Present		
United States (Florida)	Fort Myers	Southwest Florida International Airport	November 11, 2021	Present		
United States (Florida)	Jacksonville	Jacksonville International Airport	February 14, 2025	Present		
United States (Florida)	Key West	Key West International Airport	November 19, 2025	Present	Seasonal	
United States (Florida)	Lakeland	Lakeland Linder International Airport	June 13, 2024	Present	Base	
United States (Florida)	Melbourne	Melbourne Orlando International Airport	June 21, 2023	January 6, 2024	Terminated	
United States (Florida)	Miami	Miami International Airport	June 6, 2025	August 16, 2025	Terminated	
United States (Florida)	Orlando	Orlando International Airport	November 3, 2021	Present		
United States (Florida)	Sarasota	Sarasota–Bradenton International Airport	January 13, 2022	Present		
United States (Florida)	Tampa	Tampa International Airport	November 8, 2021	Present		
United States (Florida)	West Palm Beach	President Donald J. Trump International Airport	December 16, 2021	Present		
United States (Georgia)	Atlanta	Hartsfield–Jackson Atlanta International Airport	May 2, 2024	Present		
United States (Georgia)	Savannah	Savannah/Hilton Head International Airport	May 6, 2022	Present	Seasonal	
United States (Idaho)	Boise	Boise Airport	May 24, 2022	May 1, 2025	Terminated	
United States (Illinois)	Chicago	Midway International Airport	May 26, 2022	November 4, 2024	Terminated	
United States (Illinois)	Chicago	O'Hare International Airport	May 15, 2025	Present	Seasonal	
United States (Indiana)	Indianapolis	Indianapolis International Airport	June 18, 2026	Present		
United States (Iowa)	Cedar Rapids	Eastern Iowa Airport	January 14, 2023	March 18, 2023	Terminated	
United States (Iowa)	Dubuque	Dubuque Regional Airport	March 22, 2023	April 6, 2024	Terminated	
United States (Kentucky)	Lexington	Blue Grass Airport	October 19, 2022	February 20, 2023	Terminated	
United States (Louisiana)	New Orleans	Louis Armstrong New Orleans International Airport	November 14, 2024; December 17, 2026	January 11, 2026 –	Future	
United States (Maine)	Portland	Portland International Jetport	May 21, 2025	August 31, 2025	Terminated	
United States (Maryland)	Baltimore	Baltimore/Washington International Airport	May 26, 2022	Present	Seasonal	
United States (Michigan)	Detroit	Detroit Metropolitan Airport	April 4, 2025	Present	Seasonal	
United States (Michigan)	Grand Rapids	Gerald R. Ford International Airport	May 23, 2025	Present		
United States (Michigan)	Kalamazoo	Kalamazoo/Battle Creek International Airport	October 26, 2022	April 8, 2024	Terminated	
United States (Michigan)	Lansing	Capital Region International Airport	October 26, 2022	April 7, 2024	Terminated	
United States (Michigan)	Traverse City	Cherry Capital Airport	June 15, 2024	September 17, 2025	Terminated	
United States (Missouri)	St. Louis	St. Louis Lambert International Airport	June 13, 2024	January 5, 2025	Terminated	
United States (Montana)	Bozeman	Bozeman Yellowstone International Airport	April 30, 2021; June 28, 2023	September 15, 2021; April 27, 2025	Terminated	
United States (Montana)	Kalispell	Glacier Park International Airport	May 22, 2023	August 30, 2025	Terminated	
United States (Nevada)	Las Vegas	Harry Reid International Airport	September 16, 2021; November 12, 2026	August 11, 2025; Present		
United States (New Hampshire)	Manchester	Manchester–Boston Regional Airport	June 21, 2023	January 5, 2026	Terminated	
United States (New York)	Albany	Albany International Airport	May 10, 2024	Present		
United States (New York)	Binghamton	Greater Binghamton Airport	November 16, 2022	August 18, 2024	Terminated	
United States (New York)	Islip	Long Island MacArthur Airport	May 22, 2025	Present	Seasonal	
United States (New York)	Rochester	Greater Rochester International Airport	June 14, 2023	Present		
United States (North Carolina)	Charlotte/Concord	Concord–Padgett Regional Airport	May 2, 2024	Present	Base	
United States (North Carolina)	Raleigh/Durham	Raleigh–Durham International Airport	May 26, 2022	Present		
United States (North Carolina)	Wilmington	Wilmington International Airport	June 30, 2022	Present		
United States (Ohio)	Cleveland	Cleveland Hopkins International Airport	June 19, 2026	Present		
United States (Ohio)	Dayton	Dayton International Airport	January 13, 2023	September 18, 2023	Terminated	
United States (Oregon)	Eugene	Eugene Airport	May 12, 2021	October 20, 2025	Terminated	
United States (Oregon)	Medford	Rogue Valley International–Medford Airport	May 9, 2021	October 18, 2025	Terminated	
United States (Oregon)	Redmond/Bend	Redmond Municipal Airport	May 13, 2021	October 20, 2025	Terminated	
United States (Oregon)	Salem	McNary Field	October 5, 2023	August 10, 2025	Terminated	
United States (South Carolina)	Charleston	Charleston International Airport	May 5, 2022	Present	Seasonal	
United States (South Carolina)	Greenville/Spartanburg	Greenville–Spartanburg International Airport	June 7, 2023	Present	Seasonal	
United States (South Carolina)	Myrtle Beach	Myrtle Beach International Airport	May 5, 2022	Present		
United States (Tennessee)	Knoxville	McGhee Tyson Airport	May 9, 2024	Present	Seasonal	
United States (Tennessee)	Memphis	Memphis International Airport	June 14, 2023	September 4, 2023	Terminated	
United States (Tennessee)	Nashville	Nashville International Airport	May 6, 2022	Present	Seasonal	
United States (Texas)	Brownsville/South Padre Island	Brownsville/South Padre Island International Airport	May 17, 2023	August 31, 2024	Terminated	
United States (Texas)	Dallas/Fort Worth	Dallas Fort Worth International Airport	March 7, 2025	Present		
United States (Texas)	Dallas/McKinney	McKinney National Airport	November 11, 2026	Present	Base	
United States (Texas)	Houston	George Bush Intercontinental Airport	September 21, 2026	Present		
United States (Texas)	Houston	William P. Hobby Airport	June 14, 2024	September 20, 2026	Terminated	
United States (Utah)	Ogden	Ogden–Hinckley Airport	May 4, 2021	June 26, 2022	Terminated	
United States (Utah)	Salt Lake City	Salt Lake City International Airport	October 24, 2024	May 1, 2025	Terminated	
United States (Virginia)	Charlottesville	Charlottesville–Albemarle Airport	May 3, 2023	September 4, 2023	Terminated	
United States (Virginia)	Newport News	Newport News/Williamsburg International Airport	October 19, 2022	April 16, 2023	Terminated	
United States (Washington)	Pasco	Tri-Cities Airport	April 29, 2021	October 18, 2025	Terminated	
United States (Wisconsin)	Mosinee/Wausau	Central Wisconsin Airport	October 5, 2023	August 31, 2024	Terminated	
