= Sarasota–Bradenton International Airport =

Airport in Florida, United States

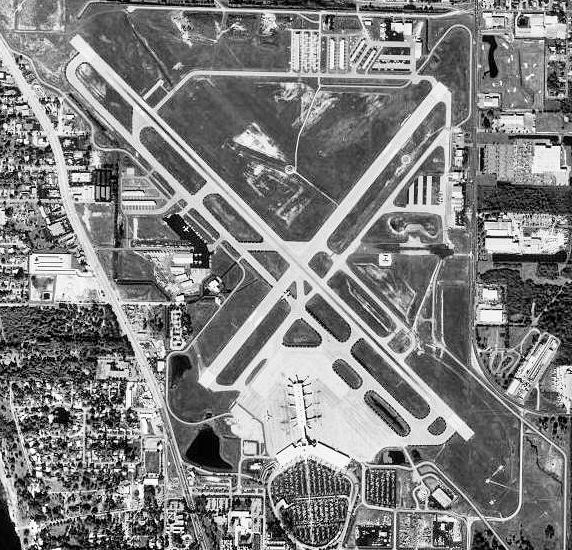
- USGS 1998 orthophoto
- IATA: SRQ; ICAO: KSRQ; FAA LID: SRQ

Summary
- Airport type: Public
- Owner: Sarasota Manatee Airport Authority
- Serves: Sarasota metropolitan area; Tampa Bay Area
- Location: Sarasota, Florida; Manatee / Sarasota counties
- Opened: 1942; 84 years ago
- Operating base for: Allegiant Air
- Elevation AMSL: 30 ft (9.1 m)
- Coordinates: 27°23′44″N 082°33′16″W
- Website: www.flysrq.com

Maps
- FAA diagram
- Interactive map of Sarasota–Bradenton International Airport

Runways
| Direction | Length | | Surface |
| Direction | ft | m | Surface |
|---|---|---|---|
| 14/32 | 9,500 | 2,896 | Asphalt |
| 04/22 | 5,006 | 1,526 | Asphalt |

Statistics (2025)
- Total passengers: 4,514,781
- Aircraft operations: 155,631
- Source: Federal Aviation Administration

Sarasota–Bradenton International Airport (IATA: SRQ, ICAO: KSRQ, FAA LID: SRQ) is a public use international airport located within three jurisdictions: Sarasota County, the city limits of Sarasota, and Manatee County, the city limits of Bradenton all in the U.S. state of Florida. Owned by the Sarasota Manatee Airport Authority, it is 3 miles (4.8 km) north of Downtown Sarasota and 6 miles (9.7 km) south of Bradenton.

== History ==
=== Origins ===
Before the Sarasota-Bradenton Airport was built, both Sarasota and Bradenton had their own airfields: Bradenton's Bradenton Airport and Sarasota's Lowe Field. Bradenton Airport was located on the southeast corner of 9th Street and 13th Avenue (near LECOM Park) established somewhere between 1935 and 1937 being abandoned at an unknown point during World War 2. Lowe Field was dedicated on January 12, 1929 and ended up opening on March 12. It was Sarasota's first municipal airport, located on 160 acres (0.65 km^{2}) of land west of what was then Oriente Avenue, which is now known as Beneva Road, and north of Fruitville Road. National Airlines began flying out of the airfield on August 4, 1937. Flights were often canceled because the landing strip got too wet to land on, which led to National Airlines leaving later that year after Sarasota could not pay for building concrete runways. During World War II, Lowe Field was used by the Civil Air Patrol. After the war, most civilian operations at Lowe Field went to the Sarasota-Bradenton Airport, with the exception of student pilots, mosquito control programs, and crop dusters. The airport continued operating until 1961 when the owner sold the land.

The airport was considered a replacement for Lowe Field's poor conditions and low capacity. Construction on the Sarasota-Bradenton Airport started in 1939 and opened the following year with CCC and WPA assistance at a cost of $1 million. In May 1941, the Sarasota Manatee Airport Authority was created.

==== Name origins ====
In the 1940s, SRQ was known by its two-character designation, RS. By 1948, growth in aviation demand prompted IATA to coordinate the assignment of three-character codes. The airport initially received the designation "SSO", a short-lived code subject to misinterpretation as the international distress signal, SOS. SRQ was chosen, with "Q" serving as filler text. The airport's IATA airport code, "SRQ", is used as a general nickname for the city of Sarasota and Sarasota area, as exemplified by media outlets like SRQ Magazine, WSRQ radio, and numerous local businesses in the area that include SRQ in their names.

=== World War II ===
In 1942, with the United States entering World War 2, the airport was leased to the Army Air Corps and became known as the Sarasota Army Airfield. The Army Air Corps later added 250 acres making the airport 870 acres. The 97th Bombardment Group was the first group, being transferred from MacDill Air Force Base in Tampa for training with B-17 Flying Fortresses staying from March to May. The 97th also performed construction and maintenance, including the construction of barracks and runway repair.

After the 97th left, the 92d Bombardment Group arrived for training and also performed construction work. In June the base was designated as a sub base changing its focus from bombers to fighters because the runways could not withstand the bombers' weight. The 69th Fighter Squadron transferred to the airfield from Drew Army Airfield to train with P-39 Airacobras. Sarasota had sub bases in: Bartow, St. Petersburg, Fort Myers, and Tampa, while Immokalee, Lake Wales, Punta Gorda and Winter Haven served as auxiliary fields for the base. Training was conducted as well on the base, with 70 pilots graduating on average every 30 days.

On July 25, 1945, a Douglas TC-47B that left out of Sarasota to Lake Charles on a navigation training session crashed after going through a thunderstorm north of Tampa. All 13 crew members died on board. The aircraft crashed roughly 20 miles northeast of Tampa.

After three years of use, the base officially closed and was transferred to civilian usage in 1947. Despite its transfer, the airport and its facilities deteriorated until the Florida Legislature passed the 1955 Sarasota Manatee Airport Authority Act. This act gave the airport more legal power and guidelines to operate.

=== Post-World War II expansion ===
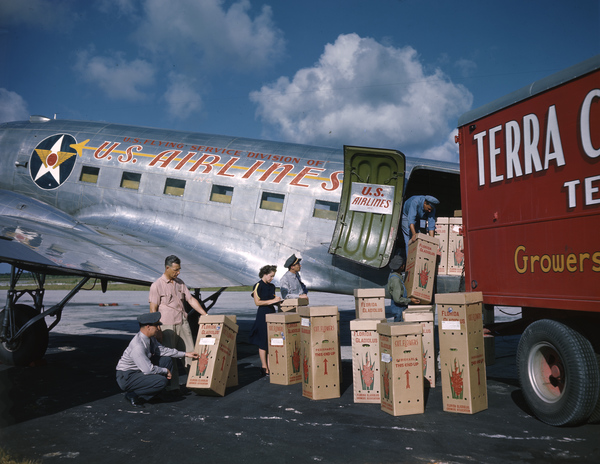
Produce from Terra Ceia Island being loaded onto a U. S. Airlines C-47, 1947

National Airlines was SRQ's first airline, moving from Lowe's Field by 1947.

Cancer research institute Jackson Memorial Laboratories considered establishing a laboratory on airport property. The extent of the plan is not known.

It was known as Sarasota-Bradenton Airport until 1956 when it got the word "international" added onto it toward the end becoming thus known as Sarasota–Bradenton International Airport. By April 1957, OAG showed six NA departures a day. Construction started on a terminal building designed by Paul Rudolph and locally known architect, John Cromwell, on August 18, 1958, and opening on May 2 the next year. with: a control tower, ticketing area, offices, gift shop, coffee shop, and a balcony for passengers to watch their planes arrive. In its opening year of 1959, the airport had roughly 22,000 annual passengers. Eastern arrived in January 1961, along with an air mail service as well. The airport's first jet flights were Eastern 727s in winter 1964–65 (though the longest runway was 5006 ft for a few years after that). By the 1960s the airport along with Eastern and National Airlines, welcomed two commuter airlines: Executive in 1964 and Florida Air in 1968. Executive established Sarasota as a maintenance base and later their headquarters from 1968 to 1971 and flew flights to Tampa and Fort Myers.

=== 1970s ===
By 1970, the airport had five commercial airlines: Eastern, National, Executive, Florida, and for a brief period, Mackey. Despite its continued growth through the 1970s, many airlines services were intermittent. Mackey and Florida both left in early 1970. Florida returned four years later and simultaneously established Sarasota as its headquarters. When Executive Airlines went bankrupt in 1971, it was replaced by Shawnee Airlines for a year and later returned in 1977. On March 30, 1974, an armed man attempted to hijack a Boeing 727 from National Airlines. He brought two hostages with him and demanded to be flown out of the area. He was unsuccessful, as a maintenance worker onboard disarmed him. He was captured about four hours afterwards. He received two concurrent sentences, one for 15 years and another for 25. A commuter airline named Sun Airlines had flights to several destinations from mid-1974 to mid-1975. The latter part of the decade introduced North Central Airlines in 1978, and Delta the following year.

The Airport Authority changed during the 1970s as well. In 1970, voters in Manatee and Sarasota counties decided that the authority should be elected instead of appointed, and state legislation was passed affirming this in 1972.

==== 1976 presidential election ====
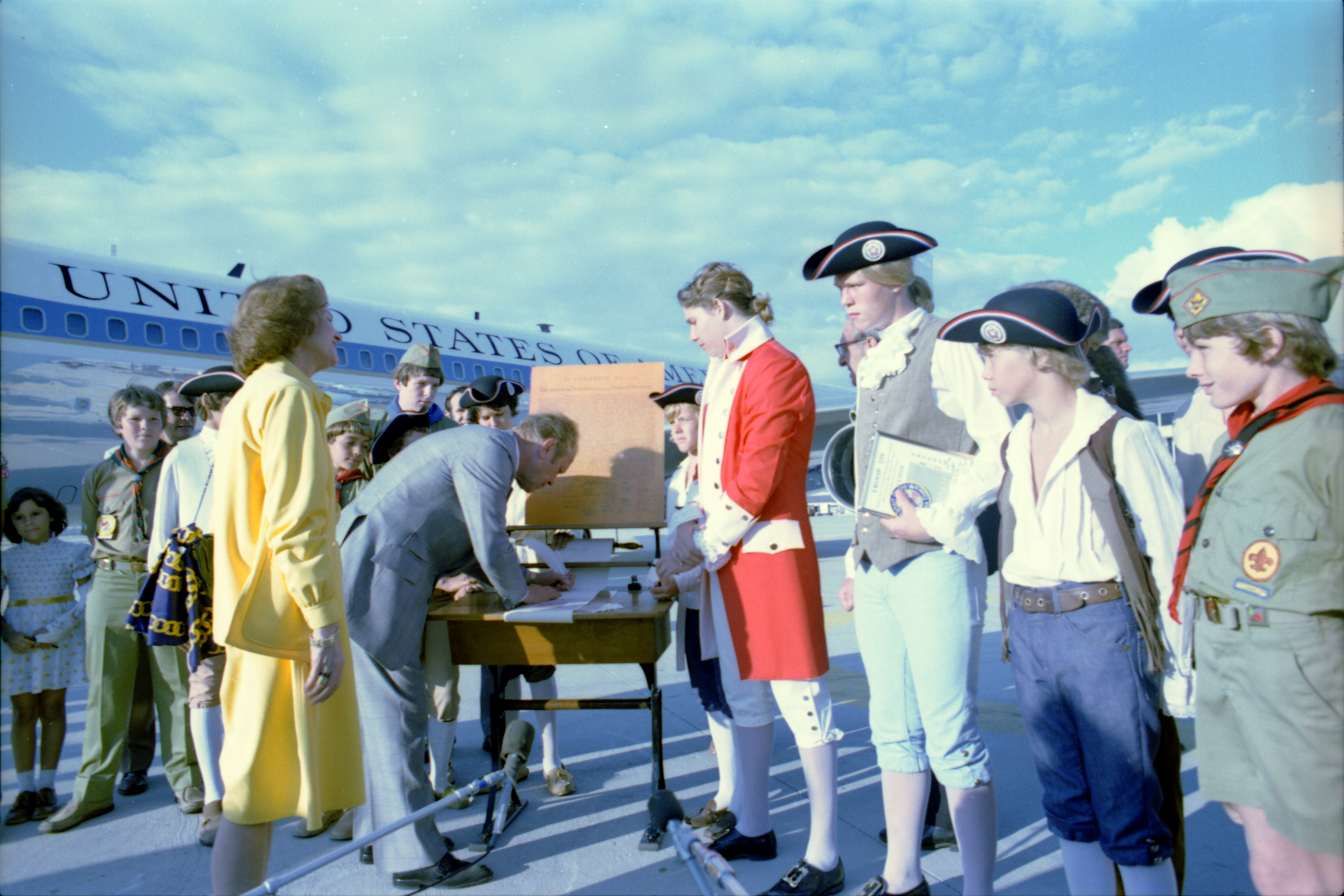
President Gerald R. Ford signing a proclamation presented by the Boy Scouts of America at the airport during his visit to the area

During the 1976 presidential election, several candidates visited and/or flew into the airport. On February 23, 1976, Gerald R. Ford and his family flew into the airport on Air Force One while visiting Sarasota on a trip across Florida. He briefly took questions from the press before leaving to go to a hotel. The following day he went to a church service and a barbecue. He gave a brief press conference before flying out of the airport to Tampa. Next month, on March 2, Jimmy Carter held a press conference at the airport before speaking to the public at adjacent New College. Likely that same day, Henry "Scoop" Jackson, another presidential candidate running on the Democratic ticket, hosted a campaign rally at the airport. George Wallace also visited the airport two days later on March 4.

=== 1980s and 1990s ===
In the late 1970s and early 1980s, there was a controversial proposal to move the airport by both Sarasota County and Manatee County due to airport overcrowding. An opinion poll was held in 1970, with 66% of voters voting against a new airport. The proposal suggested making the facility into a general aviation airport and constructing a replacement east of future Interstate 75 within Lakewood Ranch. Opposition to the airport also came from a local environmentalist, Gloria Rains, who was the head and founder of ManaSota-88, an environmental group. Rains would later oppose the development of Lakewood Ranch as well, but did like that natural features in the area were preserved. However, the airport authority struck down the idea in 1985. When a referendum was held in 1986 on the matter (as required under state law if they wanted to move the airport) it was struck down.

Instead of building a new airport, the airport's facilities, in general, would be expanded. Work began in 1987 to build a new airport terminal along with areas for parking, ramp space and landscaping. The new terminal building opened on October 29, 1989. During the first day the new airport terminal was in operation, the Sarasota Herald-Tribune reported that passengers and airline staff liked it. On its first day of operations the airport was still under construction and several problems were encountered: the computer system on the upstairs level security checkpoint area had glitches, along with problems being reported with the terminal's air conditioning. The rest of the project was finished by 1990.

A facility for commuter flights was added onto the airport in 1983.

The airport was designated port of entry status in 1992.

=== September 11 attacks ===
President George W. Bush aboard Air Force One flew into the airport on the evening of September 10, 2001 from Jacksonville taking Bush to the Colony Beach and Tennis Resort located nearby on Longboat Key where President Bush was expected to visit an elementary school in Sarasota the following day. Air Force One was at the airport on September 11, 2001. George W. Bush was at the Emma E. Booker Elementary School in Sarasota when Andrew Card first informed him of the September 11, 2001 attacks, at 9:05 AM. Bush left the school at 9:32 AM after making a statement about the attacks and returned to the airport at 9:44 AM. Air Force One taxied out at 9:54 AM and took off from runway 14 at 9:55 AM, employing the emergency capability of the VC-25 to perform a "rocket-like climb". It flew first to Barksdale Air Force Base in Louisiana.

=== 2003 – present ===
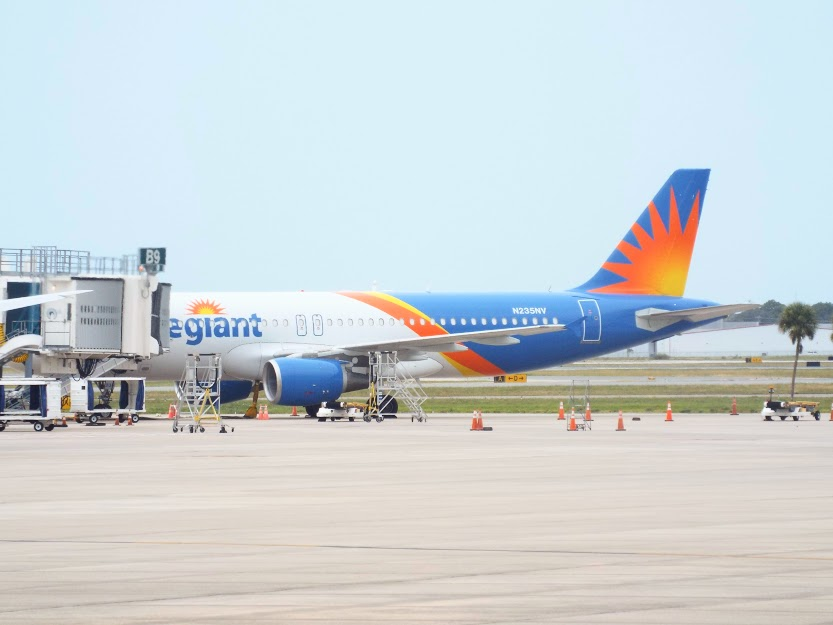
An Allegiant Air A320 at SRQ

In 2003, AirTran Airways began service at SRQ to Hartsfield–Jackson Atlanta International Airport, and Baltimore–Washington International Airport, and by 2011 the airline served six U.S. cities nonstop from SRQ.

In January 2012, AirTran Airways announced that it would drop SRQ on August 12, 2012, as part of its merger with Southwest Airlines. Despite this, Southwest Airlines began service to SRQ in February 2021.

==== Late 2010s and the 2020s ====
Construction on a new aircraft control tower started in November 2015 and was finished in 2017. Starting in the late 2010s, the airport started to rapidly grow in passenger traffic in a move mostly credited to Allegiant beginning to service the airport. Before the COVID-19 pandemic, the airport was one of the fastest growing in the United States.

On December 19, 2019, a GMC pickup truck crashed into the baggage claim, causing $250,000 in damage.

The COVID-19 pandemic resulted in air traffic significantly declining similar to other airports in the United States, but it was among the least impacted airports nationally. Despite a decline in the number of passengers several new flights were added/announced. Elite Airways expanded operations at the airport in 2021 when they started nonstop flights to White Plains, Martha's Vineyard, Nantucket and Portland, Maine on July 2. Passenger numbers in 2021 ended up being 70% higher than before the pandemic, and a one-year passenger traffic record set in 1990 was broken in a span of eight months. Avelo Airlines announced in August 2023 that a new flight would be added to Wilmington, Delaware with service beginning in November and the first flight occurred on November 2.

The airport broke ground on a second concourse on March 27, 2023. The new concourse, known as Concourse A, opened in January 2025 with five gates, bar, café, a restaurant, and a marketplace. The addition of Concourse A is expected to increase passenger capacity by 2.5 million. Also in 2025, an observation area opened named SRQ Observation Deck outside the airport in March. The observation area contains a speaker giving live audio from the air traffic control tower, a playground, and parking lot.

Hurricane Milton caused significant damage to the airport, including losing the entire roof of Concourse B. On October 11, 2024, the airport stated that it would remain closed until October 16.

== Facilities ==
The airport covers 1,102 acres (446 ha) at an elevation of 30 feet (9.1 m). It has two asphalt runways: 14/32 is 9,500 by 150 feet (2,896 x 46 m) and 04/22 is 5,006 by 150 feet (1,526 x 46 m).

The National Plan of Integrated Airport Systems (NPIAS) for 2023–2027 categorized it a "small hub" airport since it enplanes 0.05 percent to 0.25 percent of total U.S. passenger enplanements.

=== Terminal ===
The airport contains one terminal with a total of 18 gates on two concourses.

- Concourse A contains 5 gates (Gates A4-A8). Concourse A is a ground-level concourse on the east side of the terminal. It is used exclusively by Allegiant Air.
- Concourse B contains 13 gates (Gates B1-B12, B14). Concourse B is in the center of the terminal on the second level and is used by all other airlines. All gates in Concourse B have jet bridges. Customs and Immigration services for international flights are located on the lower level of Concourse B.

The terminal opened on October 29, 1989. Upon opening, the terminal included Concourse B and a small commuter concourse on the west end of the ticket counter (Gates D1-D4). The D gates were exclusively for ground-boarded commuter flights by airlines including Comair, American Eagle, and Air Sunshine. The D Gates had its own security checkpoint and baggage claim. The D Gates were closed in the early 2000s due to a reduction in commuter flights. The holding area for the D Gates was walled off from the ticketing area upon its closure, and later the space was converted to other uses including a large conference room.

On March 27, 2023, the airport broke ground on the terminal's first major expansion. The 75,300 square foot expansion included the addition of Concourse A, which opened in January 2025.

=== Airport security and fire services ===
The Sarasota-Manatee Airport Authority Police Department is an independent, Florida Department of Law Enforcement certified law enforcement agency located in Sarasota, Florida. The department is responsible for the security and protection of the assets of the airport including the terminals, tarmac, runway, FBO terminals, cargo facilities and buildings leased to third parties on airport property. Because Sarasota–Bradenton International Airport is located within two neighboring counties (Sarasota and Manatee) officers are authorized to conduct investigations and arrested within the confine of both counties on and off and adjacent to the airport. Like most law enforcement agencies in Florida and in the United States the Department utilizes Ford Crown Victoria's for patrols.

The Sarasota-Manatee Airport Authority Rescue and Firefighting Services is a certified by the State of Florida and the FAA to provide fire fighting and medical rescue services at the airport including the terminals, tarmac, runway, FBO terminals, cargo facilities and airport buildings leased to third parties on airport property and like the airport police the ARFF has authority to operate and respond to fire and rescue calls in both Sarasota and Manatee counties.

The following law enforcement and fire services provide mutual aid to the Sarasota-Manatee Airport Authority Police and ARFF in the event of a major incident. For portions of the airport within the City of Sarasota, city's police department and fire rescue respond, in the unincorporated areas of airport in Sarasota County are responded by the Sarasota County Sheriff's Office, Sarasota County Fire and Rescue and the Cedar Hammock Fire Control District, in the airport's unincorporated areas in Manatee County mutual aid is responded to by the Manatee County Sheriff's Office and the Manatee County Fire Department.

== Airlines and destinations ==
=== Passenger ===
| Airlines | Destinations | Refs |
|---|---|---|
| Air Canada | Seasonal: Toronto–Pearson | |
| Allegiant Air | Akron/Canton, Albany, Allentown, Asheville, Boston, Chicago/Rockford, Cincinnati, Columbus–Rickenbacker, Flint, Fort Wayne, Grand Rapids, Greenville/Spartanburg, Harrisburg, Indianapolis, Knoxville, Lexington, Minneapolis/St. Paul (resumes April 14, 2027), Nashville, Pittsburgh, Roanoke, Washington–Dulles; Seasonal: Appleton, Austin, Belleville/St. Louis, Cedar Rapids/Iowa City, Des Moines, Louisville, Moline/Quad Cities, Omaha, Peoria, Providence (begins February 13, 2027), Rochester (NY), South Bend, Syracuse, Toledo | |
| American Airlines | Charlotte, Dallas/Fort Worth, Philadelphia; Seasonal: Chicago–O'Hare, Washington–National | |
| American Eagle | Charlotte, Miami, Philadelphia, Washington–National; Seasonal: Chicago–O'Hare | |
| Avelo Airlines | Dallas/McKinney (begins December 16, 2026), New Haven; Seasonal: Wilmington (DE) | |
| Breeze Airways | Hartford, Providence, Raleigh/Durham; Seasonal: Akron/Canton, Long Island/Islip, Portland (ME), Richmond, White Plains | |
| Delta Air Lines | Atlanta, New York–LaGuardia; Seasonal: Detroit, Minneapolis/St. Paul | |
| Delta Connection | Seasonal: Boston, New York–JFK | |
| JetBlue | Boston, New York–JFK | |
| Southwest Airlines | Baltimore, Chicago–Midway, Columbus–Glenn, Indianapolis, Nashville, Orlando, Pittsburgh, St. Louis; Seasonal: Albany, Buffalo, Cleveland, Dallas–Love, Denver, Houston–Hobby, Kansas City, Milwaukee | |
| Sun Country Airlines | Seasonal: Minneapolis/St. Paul (ends April 13, 2027) | |
| United Airlines | Chicago–O'Hare, Newark; Seasonal: Denver | |
| United Express | Seasonal: Houston–Intercontinental | |

=== Destinations map ===
Destinations map
Destinations from Sarasota-Bradenton International Airport
Year-round destination
Seasonal destination
Future destination
Destination being terminated

== Statistics ==
=== Airline market share ===
Largest airlines at SRQ (February 2025 – January 2026)
| Rank | Airline | Passengers | Share |
|---|---|---|---|
| 1 | Allegiant | 1,025,000 | 23.00% |
| 2 | Southwest | 982,000 | 22.03% |
| 3 | Delta | 890,000 | 19.96% |
| 4 | American | 514,000 | 11.53% |
| 5 | United | 363,000 | 8.14% |
| | Others | 684,000 | 15.35% |

=== Top domestic destinations ===
Busiest domestic routes from SRQ (February 2025 – January 2026)
| Rank | City | Passengers | Carriers |
|---|---|---|---|
| 1 | Atlanta, Georgia | 340,960 | Delta |
| 2 | Charlotte, North Carolina | 151,000 | American |
| 3 | Baltimore, Maryland | 140,770 | Southwest |
| 4 | Newark, New Jersey | 108,930 | United |
| 5 | Chicago–O'Hare, Illinois | 93,820 | American, Frontier, United |
| 6 | Boston, Massachusetts | 78,830 | Allegiant, Delta, JetBlue |
| 7 | Nashville, Tennessee | 74,410 | Allegiant, Southwest |
| 8 | Minneapolis–Saint Paul, Minnesota | 64,370 | Allegiant, Delta, Sun Country |
| 9 | New York–LaGuardia, New York | 61,000 | Delta |
| 10 | Chicago-Midway, Illinois | 60,440 | Southwest |

=== Annual traffic ===
SRQ Airport Annual Passengers 2018–Present
| Year | Passengers | % Change |
|---|---|---|
| 2018 | 1,371,888 | ▲16.13% |
| 2019 | 1,966,950 | ▲43.38% |
| 2020 | 1,236,986 | ▼37.11% |
| 2021 | 3,163,543 | ▲60.83% |
| 2022 | 3,847,606 | ▲21.62% |
| 2023 | 4,322,402 | ▲12.34% |
| 2024 | 4,245,686 | ▼1.77% |
| 2025 | 4,514,781 | ▲6.34% |
