= Metropolitan Nashville Airport Authority =

- Formation: April 1970
- Type: Airport authority
- Region served: Nashville, Tennessee
- Chairman: Nancy B. Sullivan, P.E.
- Parent organization: City of Nashville
- Website: flynashville.com/nashville-airport-authority

The Metropolitan Nashville Airport Authority (MNAA) manages Nashville, Tennessee's airport systems. The system includes one general aviation airport, John C. Tune Airport and one commercial airport, Nashville International Airport.
