= Nashville International Airport =

Airport in Tennessee, United States

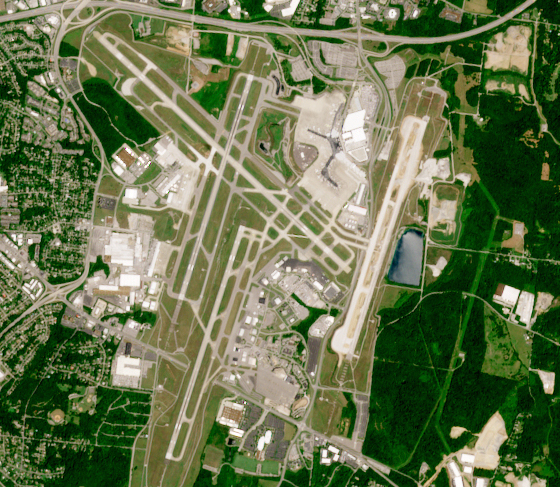
- Airport in 2020
- IATA: BNA; ICAO: KBNA; FAA LID: BNA; WMO: 72327

Summary
- Airport type: Public
- Owner/Operator: Metropolitan Nashville Airport Authority (MNAA)
- Serves: Nashville metropolitan area
- Location: Southeast Nashville, Tennessee, U.S.
- Opened: June 12, 1937; 89 years ago
- Operating base for: Allegiant Air; Southwest Airlines
- Elevation AMSL: 599 ft (183 m)
- Coordinates: 36°07′36″N 086°40′55″W
- Website: flynashville.com

Maps
- FAA airport diagram
- Interactive map of Nashville International Airport

Runways
Direction	Length		Surface
Direction	ft	m	Surface
2L/20R	7,704	2,348	Concrete
2C/20C	8,001	2,439	Concrete
2R/20L	8,001	2,439	Concrete
13/31	11,030	3,362	Concrete

Statistics (2025)
- Total passengers: 25,715,851 ▲4.6%
- Aircraft operations: 289,053
- Source: Nashville International Airport

Nashville International Airport (IATA: BNA, ICAO: KBNA, FAA LID: BNA) is a public/military airport in the southeastern section of Nashville, Tennessee, United States. Established in 1937, its original name was Berry Field, from which its ICAO and IATA identifiers are derived. The latest terminal was built in 1987, and the airport took its existing name in 1988. Nashville International Airport has four runways and covers 4,555 acres (1,843 ha) of land. It is the busiest airport in Tennessee, with more boardings and arrivals than all other airports in the state combined.

Aerial image of Sky Harbor Airport 1934

The airport was first served by American Airlines and Eastern Air Lines and was a hub for American in the late 20th century. The airport offers service to 99 destinations across the United States as well as a number of international destinations. In 2022, it averaged 600 daily aircraft movements.

Joint Base Berry Field, formerly Berry Field Air National Guard Base, is located at Nashville International Airport. The base is home to the 118th Wing and the 1/230th Air Cavalry Squadron Tennessee Army National Guard.

On September 11, 2026, the Nashville Airport Authority approved renaming the airport after singer-songwriter and actress Dolly Parton.

== History ==
=== Origins ===
Nashville's first airport was Hampton Field, which operated until 1921. It was replaced by Blackwood Field in the Hermitage community, which operated between 1921 and 1928. The first airlines to serve Nashville, American Airlines and Eastern Air Lines, flew out of Sky Harbor Airport in nearby Rutherford County.

By 1935, the need for an airport larger and closer to the city than Sky Harbor Airport was realized and a citizens' committee was organized by mayor Hilary Ewing Howse to choose a location. A 340-acre (1.4 km^{2}) plot along Dixie Parkway (now Murfreesboro Pike) composed of four farms was selected, and construction began in 1936 as one of the first major Works Progress Administration projects in the area. The airport was dedicated on November 1, 1936 as Berry Field, named after Col. Harry S. Berry, the Tennessee administrator for the Works Progress Administration. It opened in June 1937 with much fanfare, including parades, an air show and an aerial bombardment display by the 105th Aero Squadron, which was based at the field. Passenger service began in mid-July through American Airlines and Eastern Airlines, both of which operated Douglas DC-3s. The new airport had three asphalt runways, a three-story passenger terminal, a control tower, two hangars and a beacon, and was built at a cost of $1.2 million. In its first year, Berry Field served 189,000 passengers.

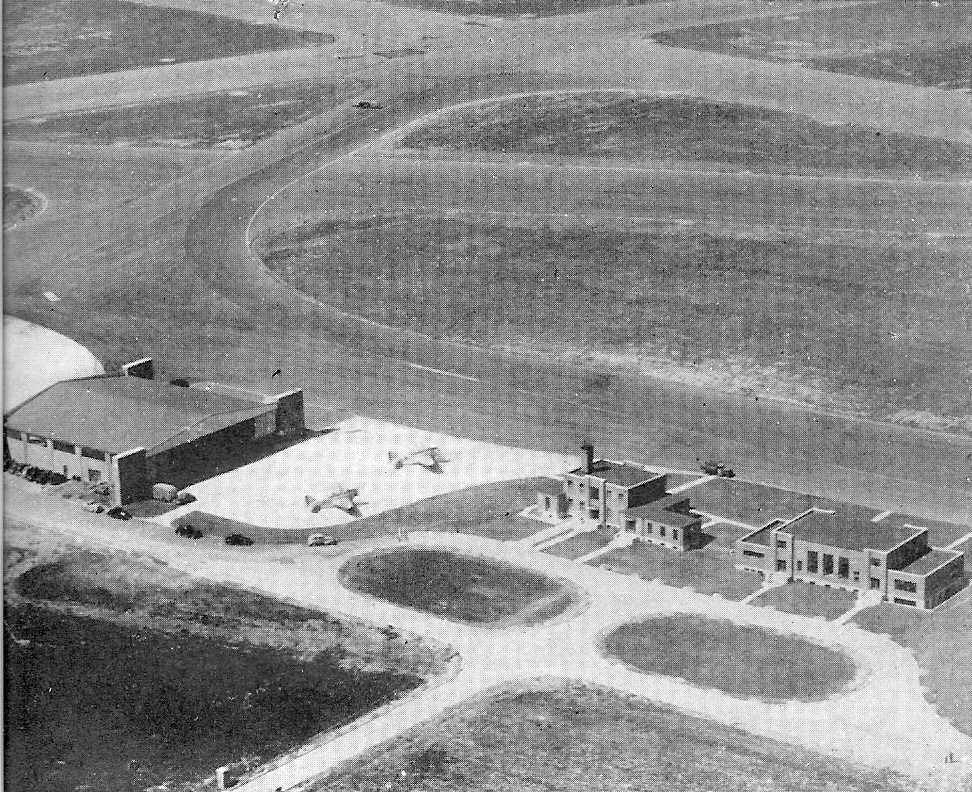
Tennessee National Guard facilities at Berry Field during World War II

During World War II, the airfield was requisitioned by the United States Army Air Forces Air Transport Command as the headquarters for the 4th Ferrying Command for movement of new aircraft overseas. During this time, the federal government expanded the airport to 1,500 acres (6.1 km^{2}). At the end of the war, the airport was returned to the control of the city, with a number of facilities remaining for support of the tenant unit of the Tennessee National Guard.

The airport had been enlarged by the military during World War II, but in 1958 the city aviation department started planning to expand and modernize the airport. In 1961, a new 145,000 square feet (13,500 m^{2}) terminal opened by Briley Parkway, west of Runway 2L. In that year, the first jets at Berry Field, American Airlines 720/720Bs, began scheduled service, and the six airlines that served Nashville carried 532,790 passengers. These renovations also included expansion of an existing runway, with 2L/20R extended by 600 feet (180 m), and the construction of a new crosswind runway, 13/31. In 1962, Nashville became the first municipal airport in the United States with a public reading room when the Nashville Public Library opened a branch inside the terminal.

By the 1970s, the airport was again in need of expansion and modernization. In 1973, the newly created Metropolitan Nashville Airport Authority (MNAA) finalized a plan for the long-term growth of the airport; the plan included a new terminal and a new parallel runway across Donelson Pike to increase capacity by reducing time between takeoffs and landings.

In the early 1980s, the MNAA commissioned Robert Lamb Hart, in association with the firm of Gresham, Smith and Partners, to design a modern terminal; construction began on the opposite side of the existing two crossing runways in 1984 and was completed in 1987. The new terminal had three main concourses and a smaller commuter concourse radiating from a distinctive three-story atrium. An international wing was built in Concourse A, and the airport was renamed Nashville International Airport/Berry Field. Although the Berry Field name is rarely used, the airport's IATA code of BNA is short for Berry Field Nashville, and the military facilities at the airport are still commonly known by this name. In 1989, a new parallel runway (2R/20L) was opened for use.

=== Hub years and aftermath ===
American Airlines announced in 1985 that it would establish a hub at Nashville, and it officially opened in 1986. The hub was intended to compete with Delta Air Lines, Eastern Air Lines and Piedmont Airlines for north–south traffic in the eastern United States. Besides providing nonstop flights to many cities in the U.S. and Canada, American also operated a transatlantic flight from Nashville to London. The American hub was touted as a selling point in bringing companies such as Nissan and Saturn Corporation to the Nashville area. Nonetheless, the hub operated at a loss even during its heyday in the early 1990s, as did its similarly sized hub at Raleigh/Durham.

American's service peaked in 1993 with 265 daily departures to 79 cities, after which flights were gradually scaled back until the hub closed in 1995. American cited the aftermath of the early 1990s recession and the lack of local passengers as reasons for the closure. In the aftermath of the hub closure, Southwest Airlines gradually filled the void by subleasing American's gates and seizing a majority of the Nashville market.

In 2002, Embraer Aircraft Maintenance Services (EAMS) selected Nashville as the location for its Regional Airline Support Facility, which was built on the site of the demolished 1961 terminal building.

In October 2006, the Nashville Metropolitan Airport Authority started an extensive renovation of the terminal building designed by Architectural Alliance of Minneapolis and Thomas, Miller & Partners, PLLC, of Nashville, the first since the terminal opened 19 years prior. The first phase of the project, completed in 2009, involved updating and expanding food and vending services, improving flight information systems and construction of a new consolidated security checkpoint for all terminals. The second phase, completed in 2011, involved the expansion of the ticketing and check-in areas, the construction and renovation of bathrooms and the renovation of the baggage-claim areas. The renovated terminal was named the Robert C. H. Mathews Jr. Terminal in honor of a MNAA board chair in 2011.

In addition to passenger amenities in the terminal and parking areas, the renovations included improvements to the airport's infrastructure. The largest project was the complete demolition and rebuilding of Runway 2L/20R, which was completed in August 2010. In addition to the rebuilding of Runway 2L/20R, Runway 2C/20C was closed from September through December 2010 for pavement and concrete rehabilitation. BNA's 91 acres (0.37 km^{2}) of tarmac were also rehabilitated during this project after being funded entirely by American Recovery and Reinvestment Act allotments.

=== Recent years ===
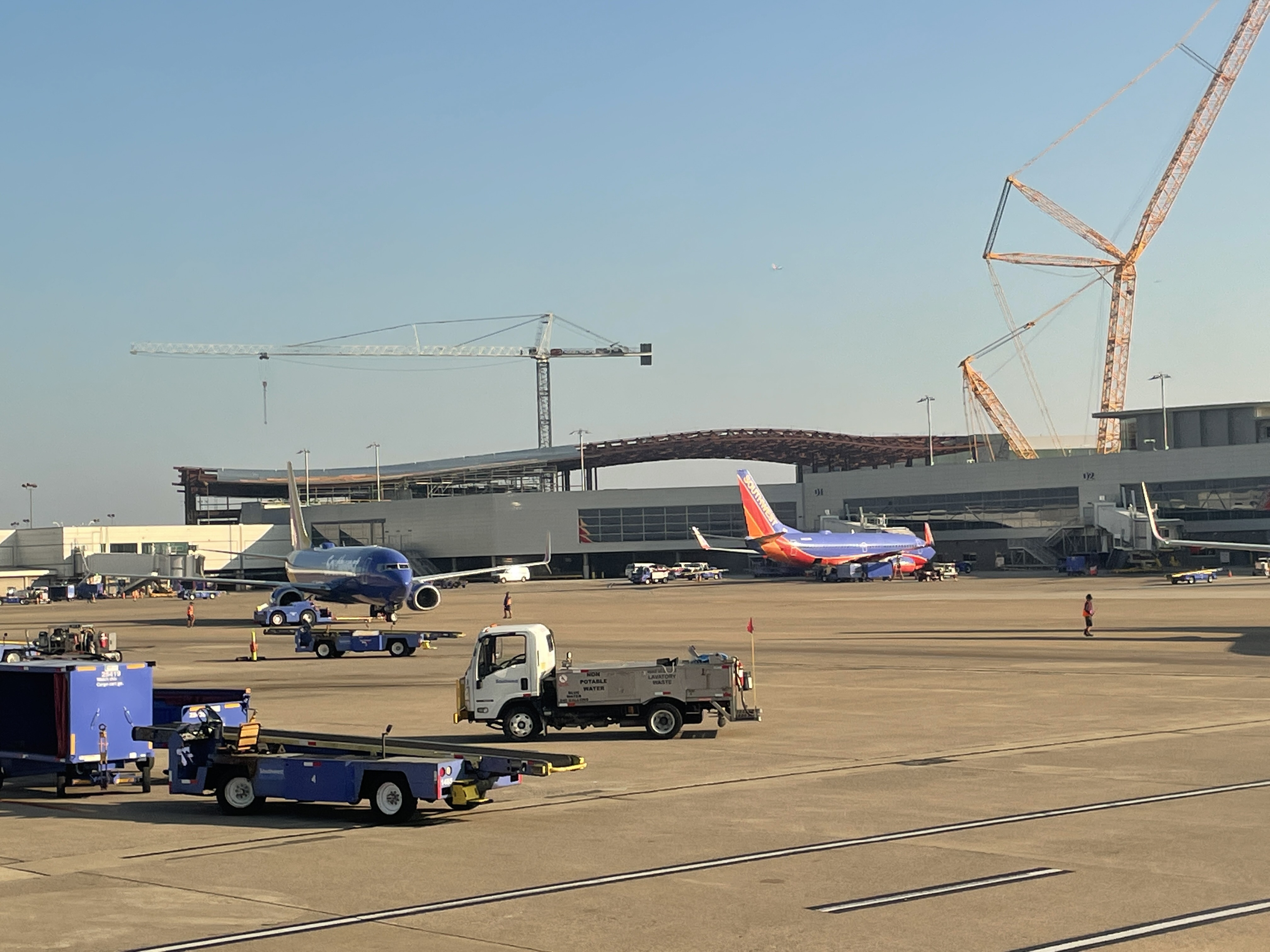
Construction in August 2021

Beginning in the mid-2010s, the airport has seen rapid growth in the volume of passengers and flights. Southwest Airlines, long the dominant airline in Nashville, steadily expanded its operations and made the airport one of its top destinations, including opening a crew base in May 2024. In May 2018, British Airways inaugurated nonstop service to London, restoring transatlantic service for the first time since American Airlines ended its London service in 1995.

To accommodate growth, the Metro Nashville Airport Authority commenced two expansion programs in 2016, entitled BNA Vision and New Horizon, to overhaul and expand many facilities. The BNA Vision upgrades consisted of expanding concourses, constructing a new international arrivals facility, building new parking garages and erecting a hotel. New Horizon's upgrades will include additional concourse expansions, upgrading the baggage handling system and expanding the terminal roadway. BNA Vision was mostly completed in 2023, and the hotel opened in March 2024. New Horizon is scheduled to be completed in 2028.

In August 2026, after the death of lifelong Tennessee resident and country superstar Dolly Parton, a Change.org petition to rename the airport after Parton gained 100,000 signatures in one day. Among the signatories were Republican Tennessee State Rep. Todd Warner and Metropolitan Nashville Councilman Russ Bradford, both of whom pledged to introduce measures in support of renaming the airport. On August 28, 2026, Governor Bill Lee announced official plans to rename the airport after Dolly Parton, subject to approval expected mid-September 2026.

On September 11, 2026, voters approved the renaming of the airport after the success of the fan-led petition. Airport authorities have noted that doing so would require a modification of their policy, which states that properties can only be named after people who have been dead for at least 2 years. The airport authority said it is working with Parton's estate to determine how best to present her legacy.

== Facilities ==
=== Terminal ===
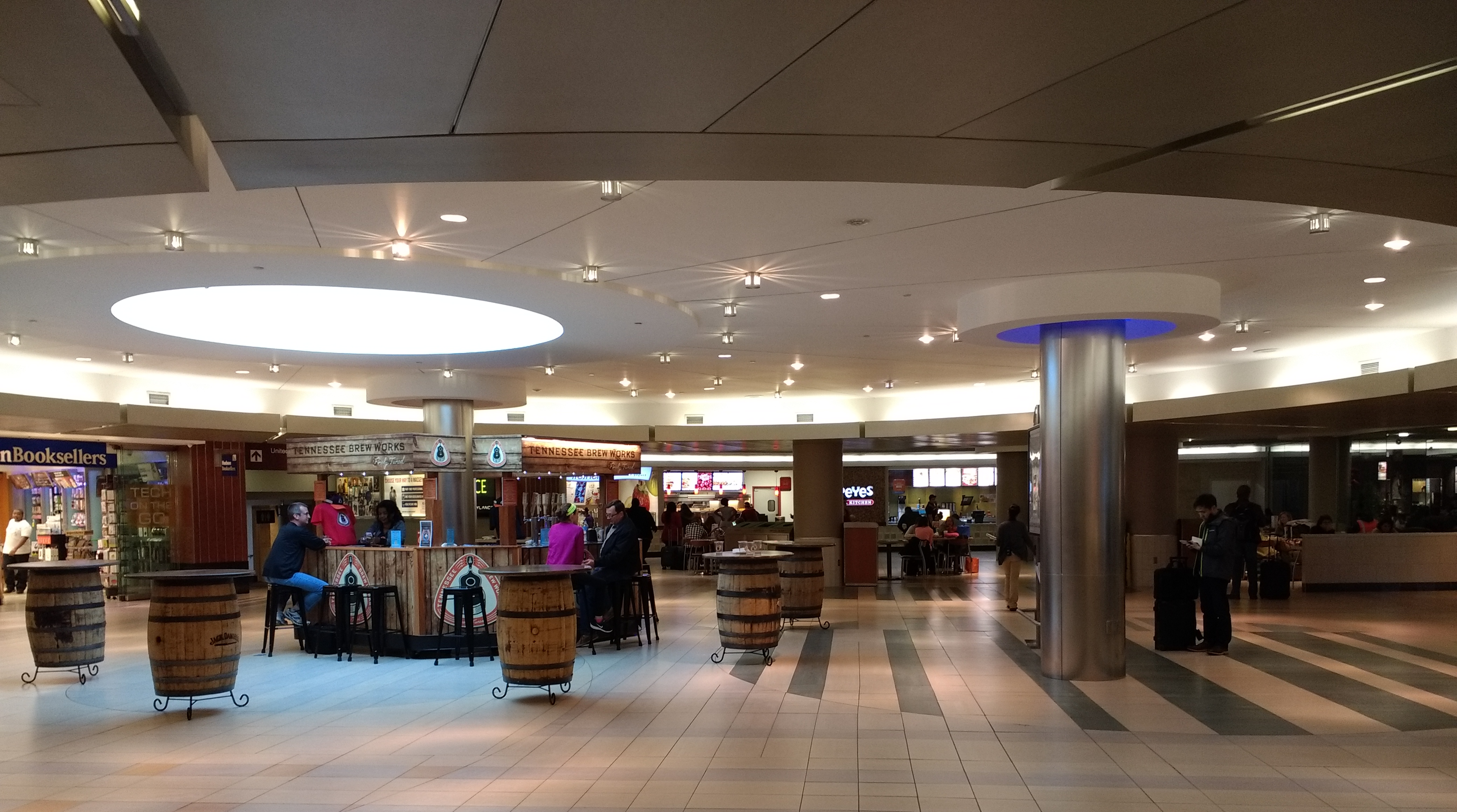
Interior of the terminal

The airport has one terminal with five concourses (of which one is currently under construction) and a total of 53 operational gates. All international arrivals(non preclearance) are processed in Concourse T. Gates C4-C11 are located on a satellite concourse.

- Concourse A is currently closed for reconstruction; it will reopen in 2028 with 16 gates.
- Concourse B contains 10 gates.
- Concourse C contains 26 gates.
- Concourse D contains 11 gates.
- Concourse T contains 6 gates.

=== Military facilities ===
Berry Field Air National Guard Base (ANGB) was located on the premises of Nashville International Airport. Since 1937 it hosted the 118th Airlift Wing (AW). Berry Field faced the removal of its flying mission with the BRAC 2005 recommendation to realign its assets to other units. It initially averted this fate by taking on a new role as the C-130 International Training Center. The C-130s assigned to the unit were eventually transferred and the 118th AW became the 118th Wing, supporting unmanned aircraft operations.

Approximately 1,500 personnel are assigned to both headquarters, Tennessee Air National Guard and to the 118 Air Wing at Berry Air National Guard Base. Approximately 400 are full-time Active Guard and Reserve (AGR) and Air Reserve Technician (ART) personnel, augmented by approximately 1100 traditional part-time air guardsmen.

The last C-130 left Nashville in December 2012, and on April 17, 2015, the first UH-60 Blackhawk helicopters belonging to the Tennessee Army National Guard's 1/230th Air Cavalry Squadron relocated to what is now known as Joint Base Berry Field from Army Aviation Support Facility #1 in Smyrna, Tennessee.

== Access ==
=== Car ===
The airport is served by I-40, which has an eastbound exit and westbound entrance ramp to the terminal road. The airport can also be accessed via the Donelson Pike exit. Taxis and rideshares may be found in the Ground Transportation Center on Level 1 of Terminal Garage 2.

=== Public transportation ===
The WeGo Route 18 bus connects the airport to downtown.

Nashville International Airport could eventually be connected to downtown Nashville via a light rail line, and the ongoing expansion allows for a connection to be made in the plaza on top of the parking garages. Proposals for Nashville–Atlanta passenger rail include a station stop at the airport.

== Airlines and destinations ==
=== Passenger ===
Airlines	Destinations
Aer Lingus	Dublin
Aeroméxico Connect	Mexico City–Benito Juárez (begins June 14, 2027)
Air Canada	Toronto–Pearson
Air Canada Express	Montréal–Trudeau
Air France	Paris–Charles de Gaulle (begins May 14, 2027)
Alaska Airlines	Portland (OR), Seattle/Tacoma; Seasonal: Anchorage (begins June 12, 2027)
Allegiant Air	Allentown, Appleton, Bozeman, Chicago/Rockford, Des Moines, Fargo, Fayetteville/Bentonville, Flint, Grand Rapids, Gulf Shores, Harrisburg, Orlando/Sanford, Peoria, Pittsburgh, Providence, Provo, Punta Gorda (FL), Richmond, St. Petersburg/Clearwater, Sarasota, Sioux Falls, Syracuse; Seasonal: Albany, Cedar Rapids/Iowa City, Destin/Fort Walton Beach, Fort Lauderdale, Shreveport, Washington–Dulles
American Airlines	Charlotte, Dallas/Fort Worth, Los Angeles, Miami, Philadelphia, Phoenix–Sky Harbor; Seasonal: Cancún, Chicago–O'Hare, Punta Cana, Washington–National
American Eagle	Charlotte, Chicago–O'Hare, Dallas/Fort Worth, Miami, New York–JFK, New York–LaGuardia, Philadelphia, Raleigh/Durham, Tampa, Washington–National
Avelo Airlines	Dallas/McKinney (begins December 17, 2026), Lakeland, New Haven, Wilmington (NC)
British Airways	London–Heathrow
Cayman Airways	Seasonal: Grand Cayman (begins May 21, 2027)
Contour Airlines	Fort Leonard Wood, Macon/Warner Robins (GA) (begins March 1, 2027), Quincy, Tupelo
Delta Air Lines	Atlanta, Boston, Detroit, Los Angeles, Minneapolis/St. Paul, Salt Lake City, Seattle/Tacoma; Seasonal: Cancún, New York–LaGuardia
Delta Connection	Austin, Boston, New York–JFK, New York–LaGuardia, Raleigh/Durham, Washington–National; Seasonal: Orlando
Frontier Airlines	Dallas/Fort Worth, Denver, Las Vegas, Orlando, Philadelphia
Icelandair	Seasonal: Reykjavík–Keflavík
JetBlue	Boston, Fort Lauderdale
Porter Airlines	Toronto–Billy Bishop
Southern Airways Express	Jonesboro
Southwest Airlines	Albany, Atlanta, Austin, Baltimore, Birmingham (AL), Boston, Burbank, Cancún, Charleston (SC), Charlotte, Chicago–Midway, Cincinnati, Cleveland, Columbus–Glenn, Dallas–Love, Denver, Des Moines (begins March 11, 2027), Destin/Fort Walton Beach, Detroit, Fort Lauderdale, Fort Myers, Greenville/Spartanburg, Hartford, Houston–Hobby, Indianapolis, Jackson (MS), Jacksonville (FL), Kansas City, Knoxville, Las Vegas, Little Rock, Long Beach, Los Angeles, Louisville, Manchester (NH), Memphis, Miami, Milwaukee, Minneapolis/St. Paul, Montego Bay, Myrtle Beach, New Orleans, New York–LaGuardia, Norfolk, Oklahoma City, Omaha, Ontario (CA), Orlando, Panama City (FL), Pensacola, Philadelphia, Phoenix–Sky Harbor, Pittsburgh, Providence, Punta Cana, Raleigh/Durham, Reno/Tahoe, Richmond, Sacramento, Salt Lake City, San Antonio, San Diego, San Francisco, San José (CR), San José del Cabo, San Juan, Sarasota, Savannah, St. Louis, Tampa, Tulsa, Washington–National, West Palm Beach, Wichita (begins March 11, 2027); Seasonal: Albuquerque, Aruba (begins March 13, 2027), Boise (begins June 3, 2027), Bozeman, Buffalo, El Paso, Grand Rapids, Hayden/Steamboat Springs, Liberia (CR) (begins February 13, 2027), Montrose, Nassau (begins June 3, 2027), Orange County, Portland (ME), Portland (OR), Providenciales (begins June 3, 2027), San Jose (CA), Seattle/Tacoma, St. Thomas (begins March 13, 2027)
Sun Country Airlines	Seasonal: Minneapolis/St. Paul
United Airlines	Chicago–O'Hare, Denver, Houston–Intercontinental, Newark, San Francisco, Washington–Dulles
United Express	Chicago–O'Hare, Houston–Intercontinental
Viva	Seasonal: Cancún
Volaris	Guadalajara
WestJet	Seasonal: Calgary, Toronto–Pearson

=== Cargo ===
Airlines	Destinations
Amazon Air	Cincinnati, Fort Worth/Alliance, Riverside/March Air Base, Wilmington (OH)
FedEx Express	Indianapolis, Memphis

== Statistics ==
=== Top destinations ===
Busiest domestic routes from BNA (September 2025 – August 2026)
Rank	City	Passengers	Carriers
1	Atlanta, Georgia	510,598	Delta, Southwest
2	Denver, Colorado	509,827	Frontier, Southwest, United
3	Dallas/Fort Worth, Texas	451,002	American, Frontier
4	Orlando, Florida	445,309	Frontier, Southwest, Spirit
5	Charlotte, North Carolina	405,136	American, Southwest
6	New York–LaGuardia, New York	398,272	American, Delta, Southwest
7	Chicago–O'Hare, Illinois	391,835	American, Frontier, Southwest, United
8	Phoenix–Sky Harbor, Arizona	343,800	American, Southwest
9	Boston, Massachusetts	328,742	Delta, JetBlue, Southwest, Spirit
10	Los Angeles, California	320,215	American, Delta, Southwest

Busiest international routes from BNA (September 2025 – August 2026)
Rank	City	Passengers	Carriers
1	London–Heathrow, United Kingdom	168,253	British Airways
2	Toronto–Pearson, Canada	150,552	Air Canada, Air Canada Rouge, WestJet
3	Cancún, Mexico	91,570	American, Delta, Southwest
4	Calgary, Canada	59,583	WestJet
5	Dublin, Ireland	55,816	Aer Lingus
6	Montréal–Trudeau, Canada	52,174	Air Canada
7	Reykjavík-Keflavík, Iceland	30,302	Icelandair
8	Punta Cana, Dominican Republic	28,405	American, Southwest
9	Vancouver, Canada	15,196	Air Canada, WestJet
10	Toronto–Billy Bishop, Canada	6,621	Porter Airlines

=== Airline market share ===
Largest airlines at BNA (September 2025 – August 2026)
Rank	Airline	Passengers	Share
1	Southwest Airlines	15,337,711	58.1%
2	American Airlines	3,346,276	12.7%
3	Delta Air Lines	2,982,949	11.3%
4	United Airlines	1,957,426	7.4%
5	Allegiant Air	599,222	2.3%
	Other	2,200,000	8.2%

=== Annual traffic ===
Annual passenger traffic at BNA 2002–present
Year	Passengers	Year	Passengers	Year	Passengers
2002	8,938,704	2012	10,180,157	2022	20,065,727
2003	8,979,774	2013	10,666,346	2023	22,975,376
2004	9,592,241	2014	11,289,747	2024	24,300,639
2005	9,956,375	2015	11,881,367	2025	25,247,226
2006	10,288,167	2016	13,098,934	2026	
2007	10,529,600	2017	14,244,511	2027	
2008	10,043,004	2018	16,058,520	2028	
2009	9,406,453	2019	18,293,903	2029	
2010	9,508,183	2020	8,390,482	2030	
2011	10,026,820	2021	15,591,879	2031	

== Accidents and incidents ==
- On January 1, 1947, a privately operated Douglas C-47A on final approach crashed into a house less than a mile from the airport. There were no fatalities, but 16 passengers and crew and two people on the ground were injured.
- On September 28, 1963, an Eastern Air Lines Douglas DC-7 crashed on landing after the aircraft's nose gear collapsed. All 45 passengers and crew survived.
- On May 31, 1985, a Gulfstream I crashed immediately after takeoff following the failure of the left engine. Both people on board were killed.
- On February 3, 1988, American Airlines Flight 132, an MD-83, suffered an in-flight fire on its way from Dallas Fort Worth International Airport to Nashville. The passengers and flight attendants noticed smoke emanating from the cargo hold as the flight approached Nashville. The pilots were notified, but no emergency was declared until after the plane had landed and pulled onto the taxiway. The plane was evacuated as firefighting vehicles arrived. There were 18 injuries to passengers, crew, firefighters and other personnel on the ground resulting from smoke inhalation and the evacuation procedure.
- On January 29, 1996, a United States Navy F-14 Tomcat fighter crashed shortly after takeoff. The jet struck a housing development and erupted into a fireball, killing the pilot and four individuals on the ground.
- On September 9, 1999, a TWA McDonnell Douglas DC-9 suffered a landing-gear collapse after a hard touchdown. All 46 passengers and crew survived.
- On October 29, 2013, a Cessna 172R departing from Windsor International Airport in Windsor, Ontario, Canada deviated from its declared destination of Pelee Island Airport, flew south to Nashville and circled the airport for two hours before crashing on Runway 2C and bursting into flames, killing the sole occupant. The burned wreckage went unnoticed for nearly six hours, as it had been obscured by dense fog, before being spotted by another general aviation aircraft. The NTSB investigation determined that the pilot, Michael Callan, was intoxicated at the time of the crash. Callan had falsely listed singer Taylor Swift as his next of kin and had written letters to her that caused investigators to believe that he had flown to Nashville to stalk her.
- On December 15, 2015, Southwest Airlines Flight 31, a Boeing 737-300 from Houston, exited the taxiway and rolled into a ditch shortly after landing in Nashville because of the collapse of the nosegear. All 138 passengers and crew were safely evacuated.
- On December 27, 2019, Southwest Airlines Flight 975, a Boeing 737-700 from Pittsburgh, sustained a bird strike while on approach, damaging the wing and horizontal stabilizer. The aircraft was able to land without injuries and was later returned to service following repairs.

== See also ==
- Tennessee World War II Army Airfields
