= Harry S. Berry =

American soldier and public administrator

Harry Smith Berry was an American soldier and public administrator who was the namesake of Berry Field.

== Life ==
Berry, a native of Tennessee, went to West Point, and served in the United States Army, in the Philippines, and in World War I and World War II, ultimately retiring with the rank of Colonel.

In 1909, he was engaged to Georgia Knox, whom he later married.

In between the wars, he was also a delegate to the 1920 Democratic National Convention. He later served as the administrator of the Works Progress Administration for Tennessee, during which he fought with Senator George L. Berry over its staffing.

== Legacy ==
Berry Field was named in his honor, as well as the former Berry Hall at the University of Tennessee; the latter was demolished in 2018.
