= Eastern Iowa Airport =

Airport in Cedar Rapids, Iowa

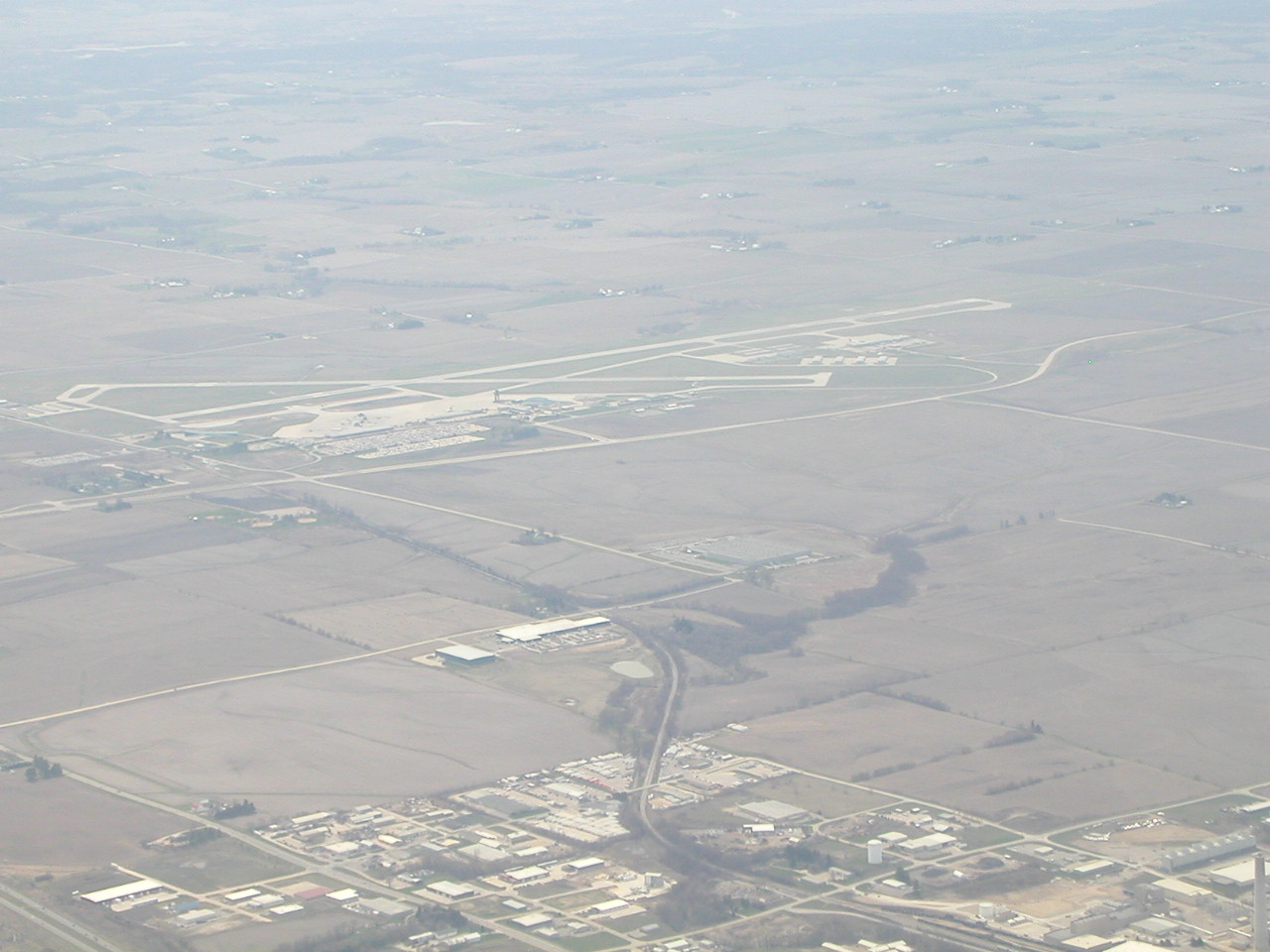
- Aerial view of CID
- IATA: CID; ICAO: KCID; FAA LID: CID

Summary
- Airport type: Public
- Owner: City of Cedar Rapids
- Operator: Cedar Rapids Airport Commission
- Serves: Cedar Rapids / Iowa City
- Location: Cedar Rapids, Iowa
- Elevation AMSL: 869 ft (265 m)
- Coordinates: 41°53′04.9″N 91°42′38.9″W
- Website: https://www.flycid.com/

Maps
- FAA airport diagram
- Interactive map of Eastern Iowa Airport

Runways
Direction	Length		Surface
Direction	ft	m	Surface
09/27	8,600	2,622	Concrete
13/31	6,200	1,890	Asphalt/concrete

Statistics
- Total passengers (2025): 1,633,266 ▲8.2%
- Enplaned cargo (lbs.) (2025): 28,337,119
- Landings (2025): 11,163
- Source: Federal Aviation Administration, Eastern Iowa Airport

Eastern Iowa Airport (IATA: CID, ICAO: KCID, FAA LID: CID) – also known as Cedar Rapids Airport – is a public airport in southern Cedar Rapids, Iowa, United States. It is located on Wright Brothers Boulevard, approximately two miles (3.2 km) west of Interstate 380. The airport covers 3,288 acres (1,331 ha) of land.

== Airline service ==
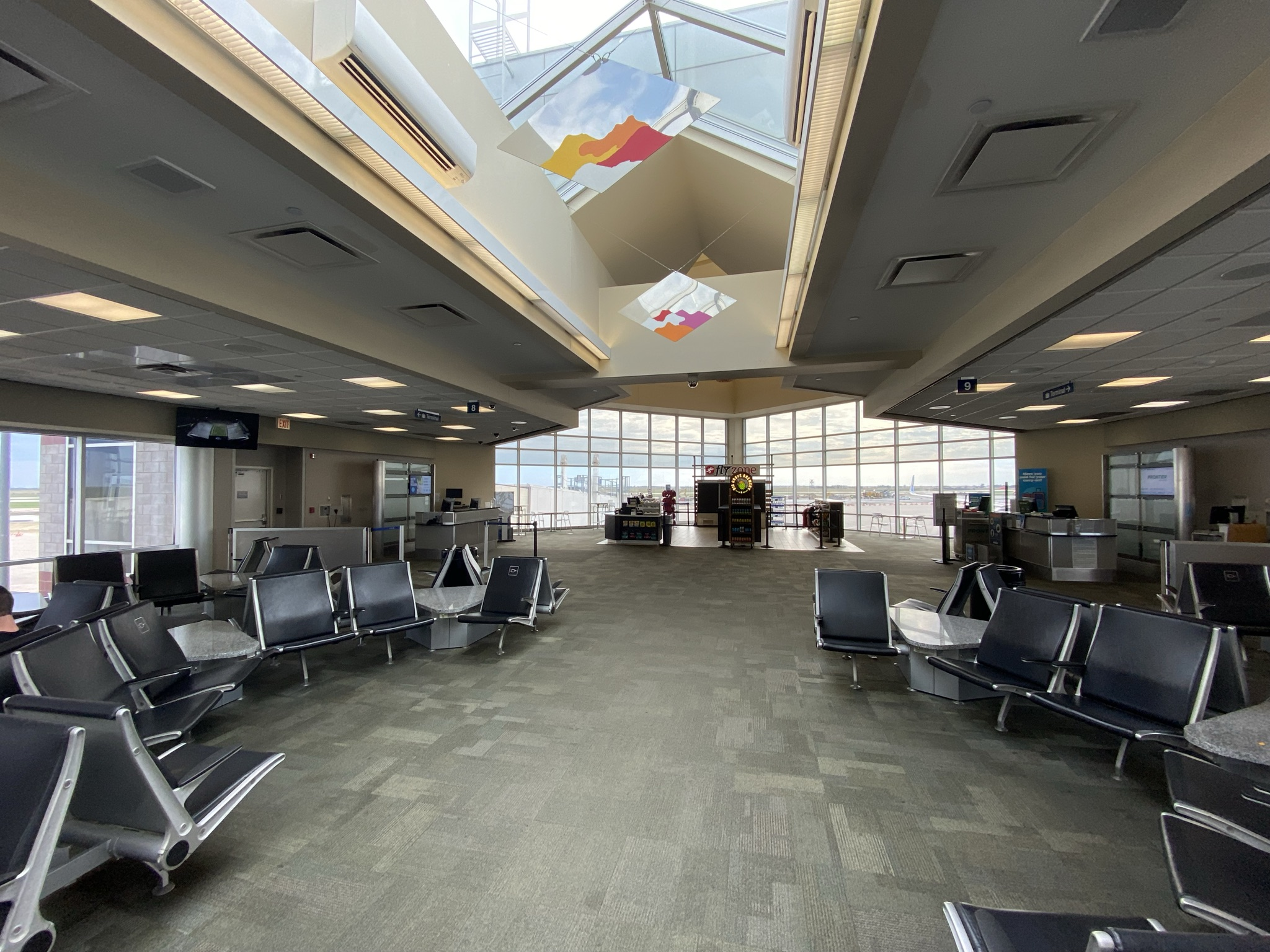
Gate area at Eastern Iowa airport

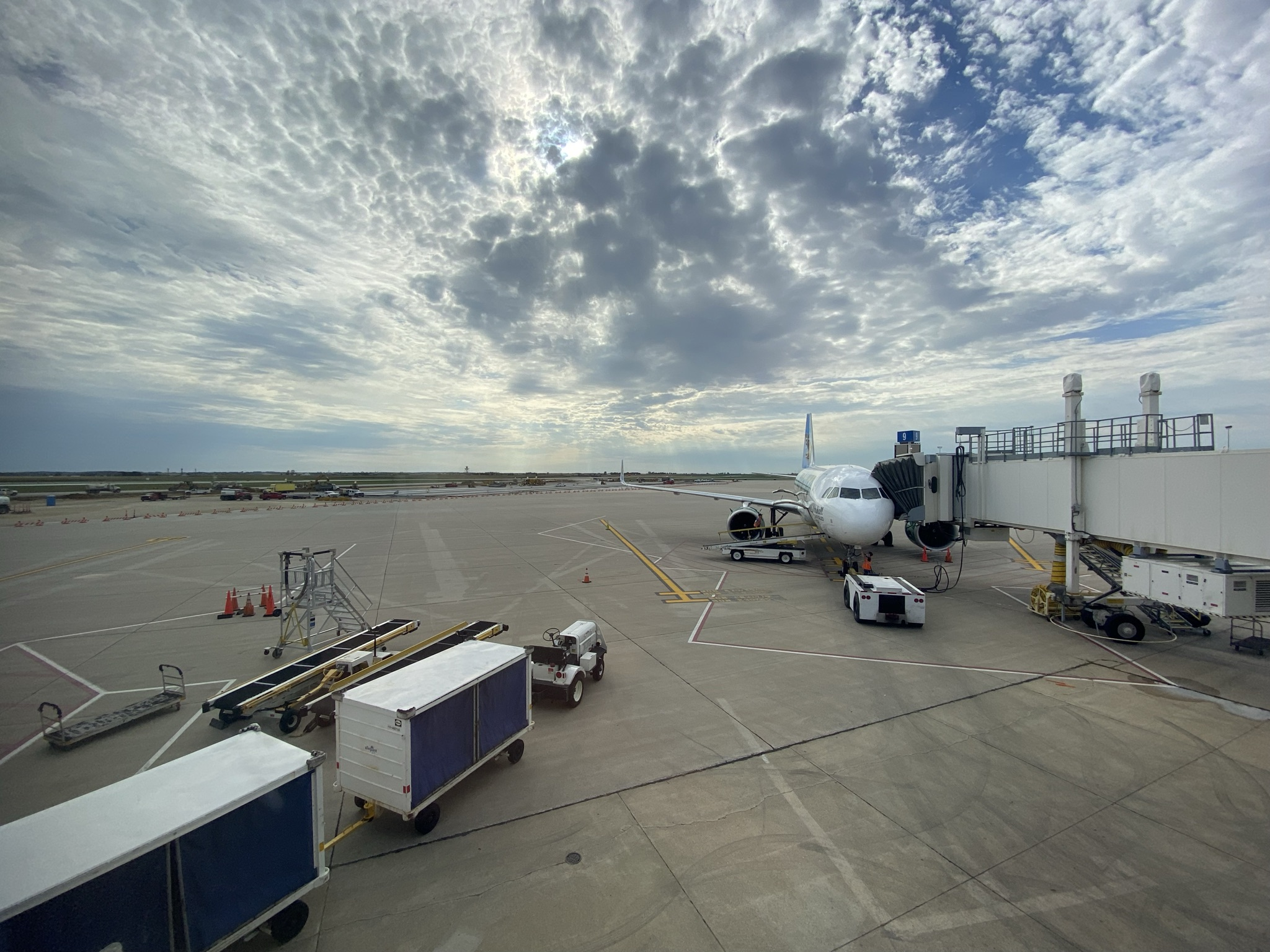
Tarmac view (construction work of new runway can be seen in the background)

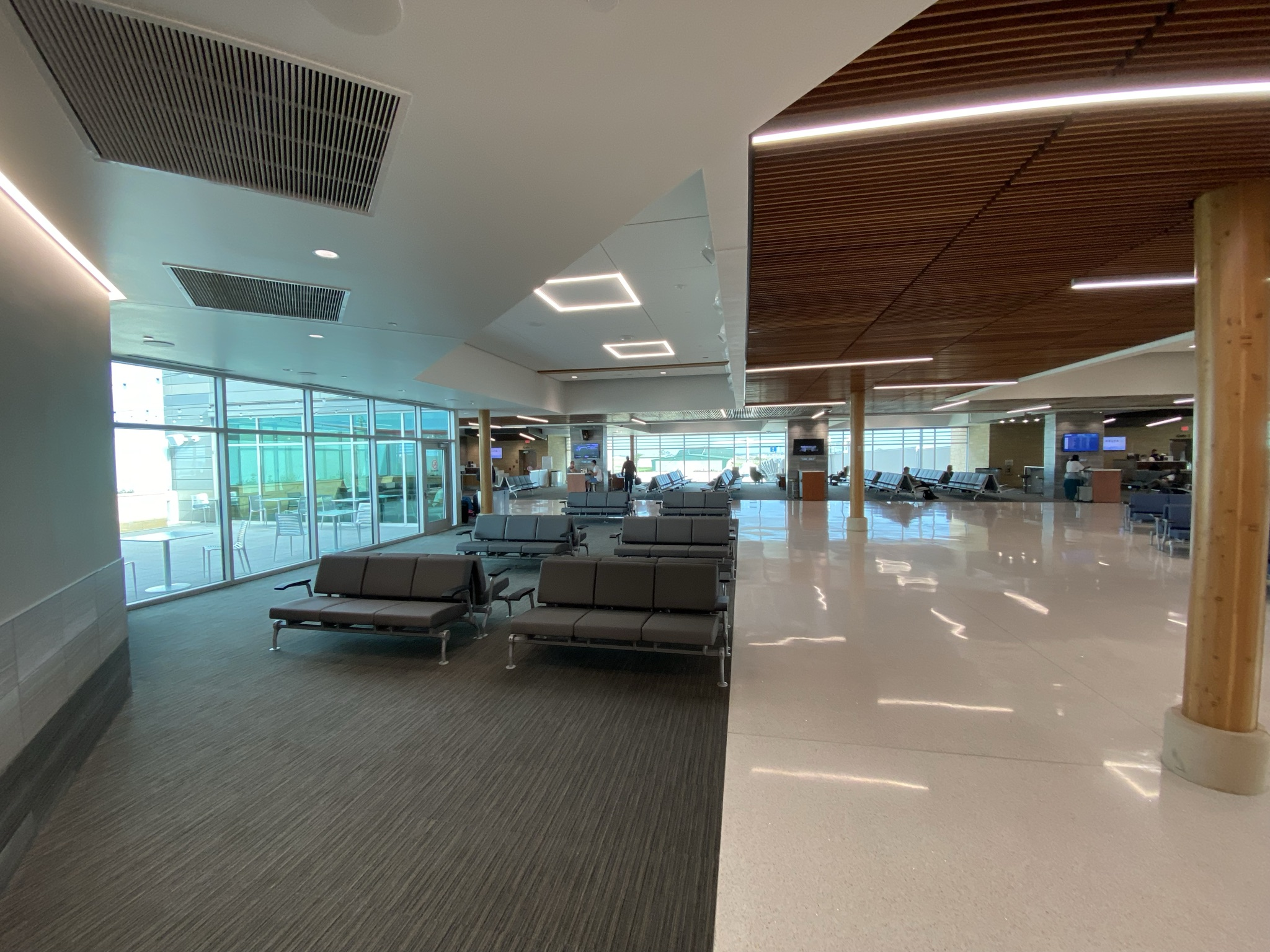
Terminal view

The airport was previously served almost entirely by regional jets, but now sees Delta use Boeing 737s that fly to Atlanta, as well as United with Airbus A320s and Boeing 737s to Denver International Airport and O'Hare International Airport. American has recently upgraded flights in 2022 on Airbus A319s and Airbus A320s to Charlotte, Dallas and Phoenix. Delta uses mostly regional jets to Minneapolis with Bombardier CRJ900 and Embraer 175, while Allegiant and Frontier fly Airbus A320 family aircraft. The airport sees five airlines with non-stop flights to seventeen airports. The airport has nine gates on the upper concourse with jet bridge boarding. The airport used to be divided into two concourses, designated (B) and (C). After the renovation, all the B gates were removed and three new gates were added in addition to the C gates. The gates lost their "C" designation and became gates 4–9. The new gates 1–3 serve Delta and Frontier. Shortly thereafter, the airport expanded the concourse and added an additional 4 gates, making for a total of 13 gates.

Arriving passengers have a short walk to the baggage claim area. Several national rental car company counters and a courtesy shuttle counter are in this area.

On July 8, 2016, the airport announced new twice-daily service between CID and Charlotte. The service started on November 4, 2016, and is flown on CRJ-700/900s by PSA Airlines, later upgraded to CRJ900 aircraft and currently now all Mainline Airbus Aircraft for American Airlines. On December 18, 2019, American Airlines began daily seasonal service from CID to Phoenix, which became daily year round service as of June 2021. This route used to be flown on CRJ900 aircraft and now is on Airbus 319 aircraft as of November 2022.

== History ==
Cedar Rapids' first airport was Hunter Field, a private airport established by Dan Hunter in the 1920s on Bowling Street SW north of U.S. Highway 30. The airport was used for private charter service, pilot training, and airmail, but it was unusable during bad weather.

Cedar Rapids Municipal Airport was completed with military funding in 1944 but was not dedicated until April 27, 1947. The Cedar Rapids Parks Department operated the airport until a new Airport Commission was established in 1945; Donald Hines, who led the effort to build the airport, was the commission's director until he retired in 1973; he died in 1975. Scheduled east–west passenger service from United Airlines began in 1947, and north–south passenger service from Ozark Air Lines began in 1957. In 1969, the airport had 31 airline arrivals each weekday and recorded 353,000 passengers that year.

The present terminal designed by Brown, Healey, Bock Architects and Planners was dedicated in 1986 with a ceremony that U.S. Secretary of Transportation Elizabeth Dole attended. The Cedar Rapids Airport was renamed The Eastern Iowa Airport in 1997 to reflect its status as a regional airport. In 2008 the airport enplaned and deplaned one million passengers for the first time in its history; it set a record in 2017 with 1,143,335 passengers. In 2019, CID set an all-time record with 1,342,496 passengers served.

On June 3, 2010, runway 9/27 closed for reconstruction, reopening on September 23. A temporary runway had been set up parallel to the closed runway. Beginning July 3, 2010, and lasting for four weeks, Runway 13/31 was also closed as they rebuilt the intersection with Runway 9/27.

== Airlines and destinations ==
=== Passenger ===
Airlines	Destinations	Refs
Allegiant Air	Fort Lauderdale, Las Vegas, Orlando/Sanford, Phoenix/Mesa, Punta Gorda (FL), Sarasota, St. Petersburg/Clearwater; Seasonal: Nashville	
American Airlines	Charlotte, Dallas/Fort Worth	
American Eagle	Chicago–O'Hare, Dallas/Fort Worth, Phoenix–Sky Harbor, Washington–National; Seasonal: Charlotte, Miami	
Delta Air Lines	Atlanta	
Delta Connection	Minneapolis/St. Paul	
Frontier Airlines	Denver, Orlando (both paused)	
United Airlines	Chicago–O'Hare, Denver	
United Express	Chicago–O'Hare, Denver	

Passenger destinations map
Destinations from Eastern Iowa International Airport
Red = Year-round destination
Green = Seasonal destination
Blue = Future destination

=== Cargo ===
Airlines	Destinations
DHL Aviation	Cincinnati, Kansas City
FedEx Express	Des Moines, Indianapolis, Memphis
UPS Airlines	Chicago/Rockford, Dallas/Fort Worth, Des Moines, Louisville, Spencer

== Statistics ==
=== Annual traffic ===
Annual traffic at CID
Year	Passengers
2013	1,042,291
2014	1,132,991
2015	1,105,625
2016	1,087,182
2017	1,143,816
2018	1,205,624
2019	1,342,859
2020	615,935
2021	1,058,884
2022	1,217,308
2023	1,381,362
2024	1,509,214
2025	1,633,266

=== Top destinations ===
Busiest domestic routes from CID (January 2025 – December 2025)
Rank	Airport	Passengers	Carriers
1	Chicago–O'Hare, Illinois	180,820	American, United
2	Denver, Colorado	125,800	Frontier, United
3	Dallas/Fort Worth, Texas	90,510	American
4	Minneapolis/St. Paul, Minnesota	66,140	Delta
5	Charlotte, North Carolina	60,170	American
6	Phoenix-Sky Harbor, Arizona	47,040	American
7	(Georgia (U.S. state)) Atlanta, Georgia	46,900	Delta
8	Phoenix/Mesa, Arizona	32,260	Allegiant
9	Punta Gorda, Florida	30,750	Allegiant
10	Sanford, Florida	24,790	Allegiant

Market Share Table:

== Accidents and incidents ==
- August 30, 1970 – US Navy Blue Angels pilot Lt. Ernie Christensen belly-landed his F-4J Phantom at the Eastern Iowa Airport in Cedar Rapids with one engine stuck in afterburner during an airshow at the airport. He ejected safely, while the aircraft ran off the runway.
- December 20, 2004 - A Learjet 25 collided with a berm while landing on runway 13 at CID Airport because of a failure of the nose gear strut, the takeoff roll was rough so a decision was made to return to the airport. There were no injuries.
- July 17, 2025 - A SkyWest Airlines flight from Omaha, Nebraska to Detroit, Michigan was forced to divert to the airport after passenger Mario Nikprelaj became "unruly" during the flight. Nikprelaj was arrested and removed from the aircraft, and the flight later continued on to Detroit. The criminal case against Nikprelaj was later moved to Federal court, with the state level charges being dropped. The FBI stated that they were investigating the incident.

== General aviation ==
Scheduled airline traffic shares the Eastern Iowa Airport with cargo and general aviation traffic. Numerous nearby airports specialize in general aviation; the closest is Green Castle Airport.

== See also ==
- List of airports in Iowa
- Cedar Rapids Transit
