= Avelo Airlines =

American ultra-low-cost airline

Avelo Airlines, Inc.

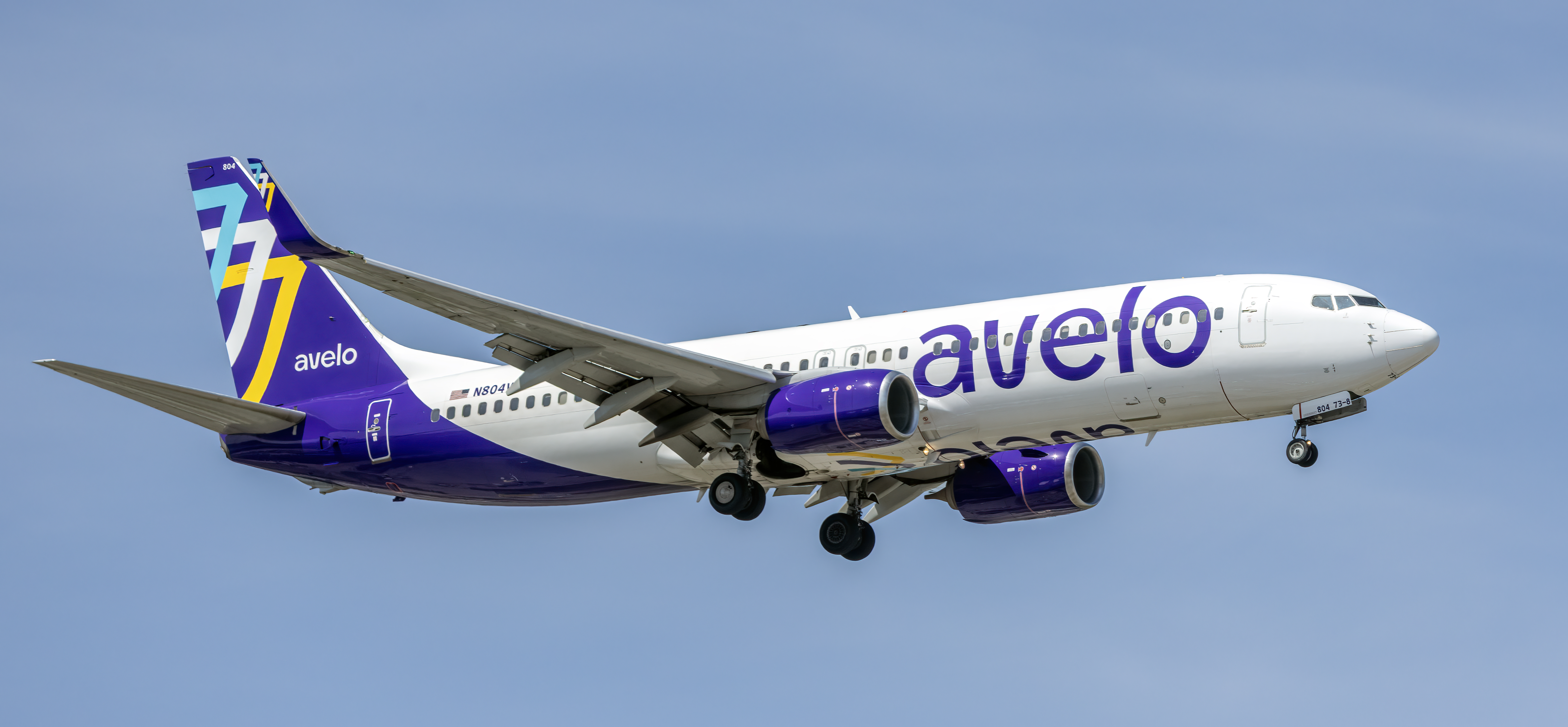
- Avelo Airlines Boeing 737-800
IATA	ICAO	Call sign
XP	VXP	AVELO
- Founded: July 20, 1987; 39 years ago (as Casino Express Airlines); December 8, 2005; 20 years ago (as Xtra Airways); April 8, 2021; 5 years ago (as Avelo Airlines)
- Commenced operations: April 28, 2021; 5 years ago (as Avelo Airlines)
- AOC #: BJNA472B
- Operating bases: Charlotte/Concord; Dallas/McKinney; Lakeland; New Haven; Wilmington (DE)
- Fleet size: 16
- Destinations: 34
- Parent company: Avelo, Inc.
- Headquarters: Houston, Texas, United States
- Key people: Andrew Levy (Chairman & CEO)
- Employees: 1,100+
- Website: aveloair.com

Avelo Airlines, Inc. (/əˈvɛloʊ/) is an American ultra-low-cost airline headquartered in Houston, Texas. It previously operated charter flights as Casino Express Airlines and Xtra Airways before transitioning to scheduled operations and rebranding as Avelo Airlines on April 8, 2021. The airline's first scheduled flight under the Avelo name was on April 28, 2021, from Hollywood Burbank Airport to Charles M. Schulz–Sonoma County Airport.

== History ==
=== Casino Express Airlines ===
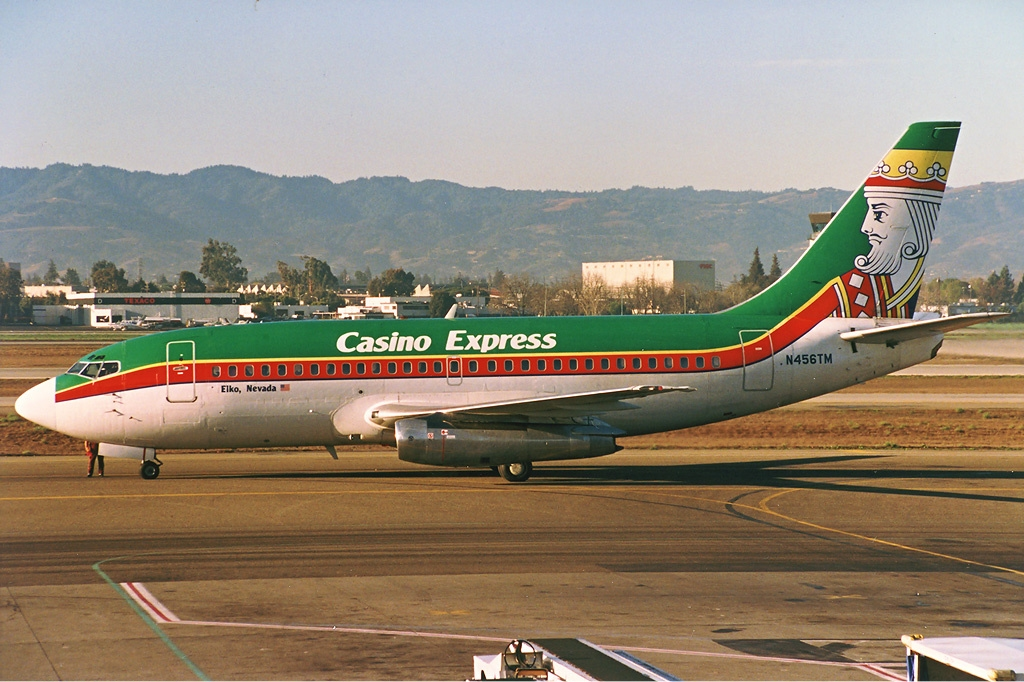
A former Casino Express Boeing 737-200 in 1994

Entrepreneur Tod McClaskey owned the Red Lion Inn and Casino in Elko, Nevada. In 1986, he contracted with Royal West Airlines to fly charters to bring gamblers to Elko. In 1987, he established Casino Express Airlines. From 1987 to 1989, Casino Express operations were flown by contract carrier Spirit of America Airlines, prior to Casino Express receiving its own certificate in 1989. Casino Express operated 737 jet service from Elko Regional Airport nonstop to many cities in the US. In 1994, Casino Express was operating scheduled weekend-only flights nonstop between Elko (EKO) and Portland, Oregon, (PDX) and Seattle (SEA) with McDonnell Douglas MD-80 jetliners. For a short time in 1999, Casino Express Airlines operated one Boeing 737-200 jetliner for the start-up airline Tahoe Air, which provided scheduled passenger air service with nonstop flights from the South Lake Tahoe Airport to Los Angeles International Airport in southern California and also nonstop service to San Jose International Airport in northern California.

=== Xtra Airways ===
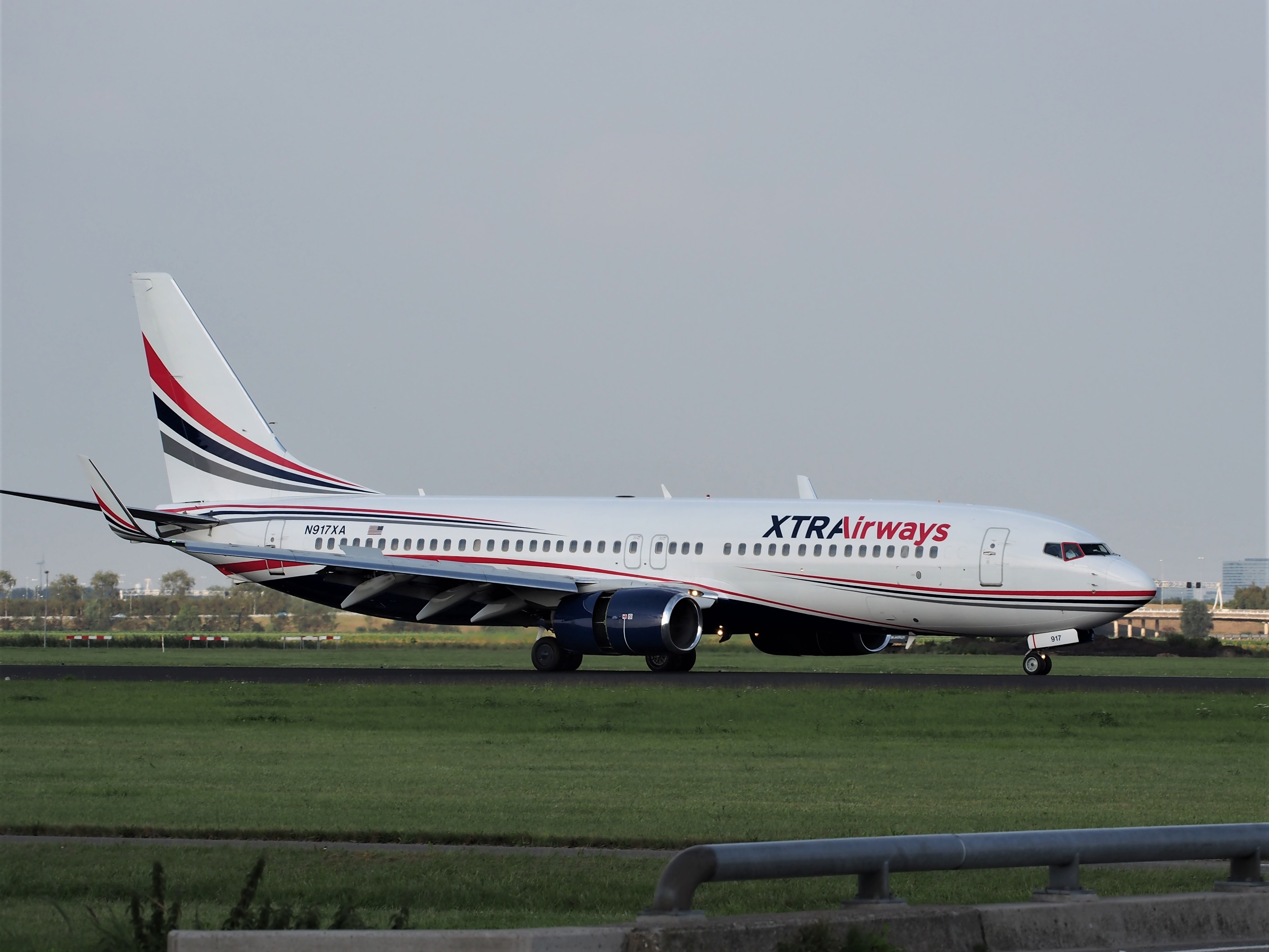
A former Xtra Airways Boeing 737-800 landing at Amsterdam Airport Schiphol in 2017

Casino Express quickly expanded its customer base to include sports teams, government agencies, foreign dignitaries, press corps, other gaming properties, and other types of public and private charters. It changed its name to Xtra Airways on December 8, 2005, to reflect its broader focus.

From 2007 through 2012, Xtra Airways dedicated two Boeing 737-400 aircraft to fly for Direct Air, an airline business based in Myrtle Beach, South Carolina.

Xtra Airways changed its aircraft livery in 2015 to an executive jet style, displaying flag blue and red stripes.

In September 2016, it began operating a Boeing 737-800 (registration: N881XA), repainted in a sky-blue and white livery with "Stronger Together" titles, for Hillary Clinton's 2016 presidential campaign. Soon afterward, a second aircraft, Boeing 737-400 (N314XA), was also chartered by the campaign, painted with a sky-blue stripe and "Clinton/Kaine" titles.

=== Avelo Airlines ===
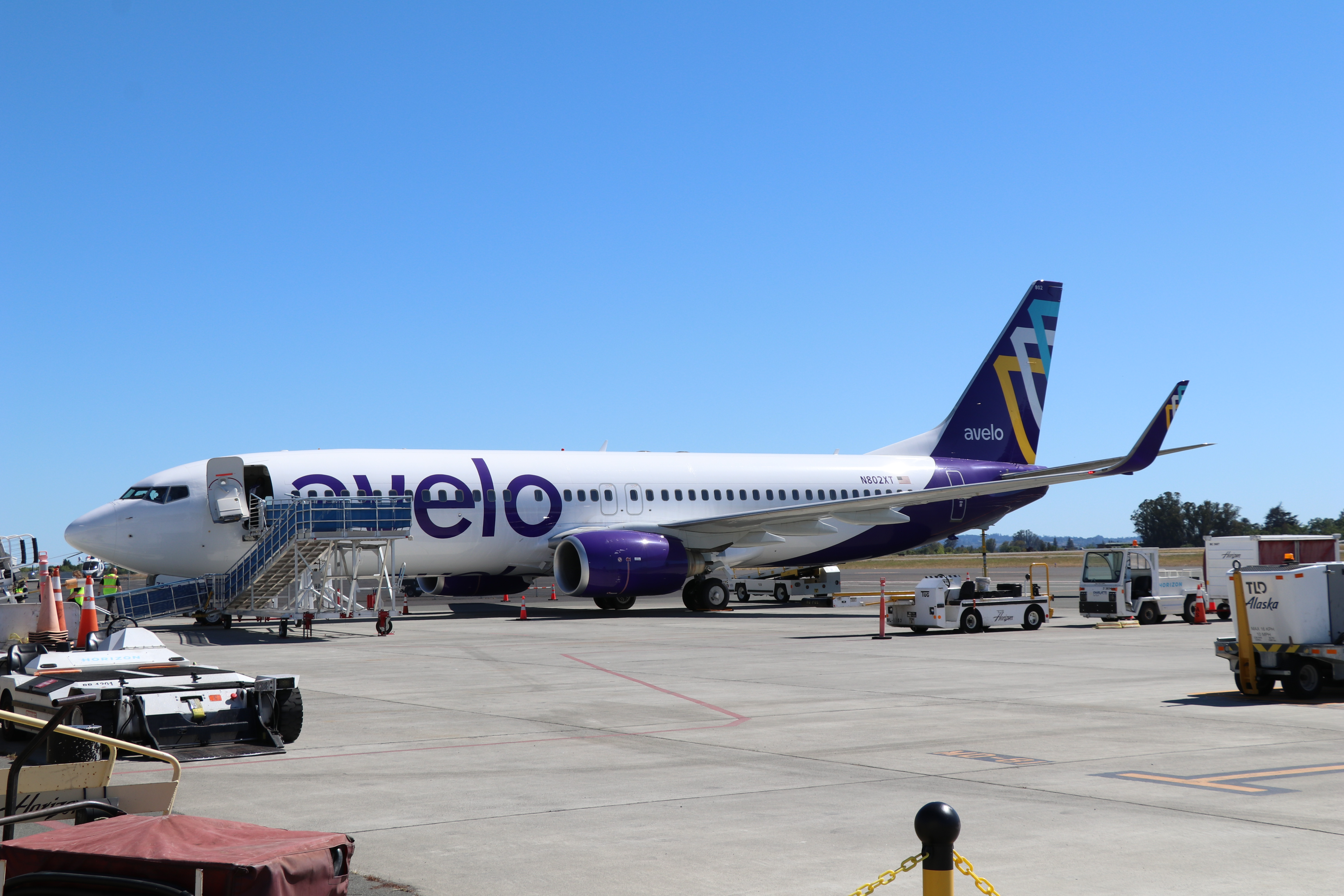
Avelo Airlines Boeing 737-800 at Sonoma County Airport after its inaugural flight from Burbank on April 28, 2021

Andrew Levy, former President of Allegiant Air and chief financial officer of United Airlines, acquired Xtra in August 2018, with the intent of transforming the charter airline into an ultra low-cost carrier. By that time, Xtra had sold most of its fleet to Swift Air, but kept one Boeing 737-400 to retain its FAA Part 121 Regularly Scheduled Air Carrier certification. By April 2019, the airline was considering operating Boeing 737-800s.

In February 2020, Levy announced the new holding company for Xtra, named Houston Air Holdings, Inc., reflecting the company's Houston headquarters. The same month, the company raised US$125 million in funding and received its first airplane from GE Capital Aviation Services ahead of its original plans to launch scheduled operations later in 2020.

On April 8, 2021, the new airline was announced under the name Avelo Airlines, and began selling tickets for flights based at Hollywood Burbank Airport in California. Its initial route network consisted of 11 unserved destinations from Burbank, launching between April 28 and May 20, 2021, with an initial fleet of three Boeing 737-800s, expanding to six by the end of 2021. Avelo's announcement of its entry into scheduled flight operations was met with competitive response initially from American and Alaska Airlines, with American upgauging to a larger Airbus A319 on its existing route between Phoenix Sky Harbor and Burbank, while Alaska announced a new service between Burbank and Santa Rosa to start on June 1, 2021. Avelo's inaugural flight occurred on April 28, 2021, which traveled from its Burbank base to Santa Rosa's Charles M. Schulz–Sonoma County Airport. The airline announced on July 7, 2021, that it would terminate its flights to Bozeman and Grand Junction by the end of September, while by July 29, 2021, the airline announced an additional five destinations including Fort Collins, Las Vegas, Monterey, Provo, and St. George, although the planned flights to Monterey, Provo, and St. George were later cancelled.

Following the airline's California launch in late April, Avelo announced on May 6, 2021, that it would open a new base at Tweed New Haven Airport in Connecticut during the third quarter of 2021. The airline additionally announced that it planned to invest US$1.2 million toward the New Haven airport's facilities, and that it would use Boeing 737-700 aircraft for its operations at the new base. On August 19, 2021, details of the airline's operations at its New Haven base were revealed, initially with four routes between New Haven and destinations in Florida announced to launch during November 2021. By the end of 2024, Avelo had expanded its service from New Haven to 26 destinations, making the airport its largest base.

On January 6, 2022, Avelo announced that it had raised an additional US$42 million. This second-round offering increased Avelo's invested capital base to over US$160 million. On April 14, 2022, the Association of Flight Attendants was certified as the exclusive representative of all of Avelo's 14 flight attendants after a vote under the Railway Labor Act was conducted by the National Mediation Board. Over the remainder of 2022, Avelo had established three more bases, consisting of Orlando International Airport in April 2022, Wilmington, Delaware's New Castle Airport in October 2022, and Raleigh–Durham International Airport in November 2022. In September 2023, the airline established its sixth base at Las Vegas's Harry Reid International Airport, but the base was relocated to Sonoma County Airport in Santa Rosa in May 2024. The airline posted its first profit in fourth quarter of 2023.

In February 2024, Avelo announced plans to add five additional aircraft to its fleet, all obtained from bankrupt Brazilian airline GOL. Additional aircraft were acquired from Aerolineas Argentinas and Southwest Airlines in the same year. In July, the airline unveiled its biggest network expansion to date, with 18 new routes, new bases at Hartford's Bradley International Airport and Lakeland Linder Airport, and the launch of international services to the Dominican Republic and Mexico for the first time. Levy stated the airline had found a niche primarily serving passengers traveling to visit friends and relatives seeking nonstop flights. Further routes from Santa Rosa to Ontario and Salt Lake City were announced in August before being terminated a few months later.

On September 10, 2025, Embraer announced a large order of their new E195-E2 aircraft by Avelo. The firm order was placed for 50 new aircraft with an additional option for 50 more. The purchase marks the first new fleet of aircraft for Avelo Airlines and a new aircraft type, straying from their current and past Boeing 737 aircraft. Deliveries are expected to begin in the first half of 2027.

==== ICE Deportation contract ====
In April 2025, Avelo Airlines signed an agreement for a long-term charter program flying for the U.S. Department of Homeland Security's Immigration and Customs Enforcement agency to "support the department's deportation efforts," the company told 12News. The company opened a new base out of Mesa Gateway Airport in Arizona, with "removal" flights commencing on May 12, 2025. The airline simultaneously announced it was ceasing service to and from Boise, Idaho, effective April 27, with the three Boeing 737-800 aircraft used for serving Boise being repositioned to serve the domestic and international flights supporting the new removal contract.

Justin Elicker, the mayor of New Haven, Connecticut, (where Avelo has its largest base), signed a petition criticizing the agreement and contacted Avelo president Andrew Levy to urge him to reconsider. The company is also facing calls for a boycott. Members of the Sonoma County Board of Supervisors in California also criticized Avelo, noting that the airline would shutter its operations base at the Sonoma County Airport and move employees for the contract, with Board Chair Lynda Hopkins stating, "They'll never get another dime from me," while also criticizing the airline's decision to participate in the "deportation industrial complex" rather than supporting the local tourist economy. City councilors in Portland, Maine, publicly considered removing the city's air service incentive program for airlines that run new nonstop flights from the Portland International Jetport, which would impact Avelo and every other airline that serves Portland. Avelo had only started servicing Portland in January 2025.

On July 14, 2025, Avelo announced it would close its Burbank base and cease all operations on the West Coast by December, citing market conditions. This move, which includes axing multiple routes and exiting several smaller airports, marks the end of Avelo’s four-year presence in the Western U.S. The decision reflects financial pressures, competitive challenges, and a pivot to more profitable East Coast markets.

On July 25, 2025, the city of New Haven prohibited the use of public funds for any travel on Avelo Airlines, stating that profiteering from "inhumane and often illegal immigration policies" was "antithetical to our values as a city."

On January 8, 2026, Avelo announced it would cease operating deportation flights on January 27, 2026. CEO Andrew Levy acknowledged that the contract with the U.S. Department of Homeland Security placed the airline in political controversy and did not provide consistent revenue.

=== Security incident ===
On November 20, 2025, security researcher Alex Schapiro published a responsible disclosure report detailing a critical vulnerability in Avelo's online reservation system. According to the report, an API endpoint allowed access to full reservation records without requiring a passenger last name and lacked rate limiting, making reservation codes susceptible to brute-force enumeration. Returned data included passenger personally identifiable information, contact details, Known Traveler Numbers, partial payment information, and complete itineraries. Schapiro stated that he notified Avelo on October 15, 2025, and the airline deployed fixes on November 13, 2025. He described Avelo's response as professional and cooperative throughout the disclosure process.

== Corporate affairs ==
Avelo's headquarters are located at 12 Greenway Plaza in Houston, Texas.

== Destinations ==
Avelo operates domestic routes on the East and West Coasts of the United States. Prior to rebranding as Avelo, the airline operated ad hoc and on-demand charter services as both Casino Express Airlines and Xtra Airways within the Americas.

== Fleet ==
=== Current fleet ===
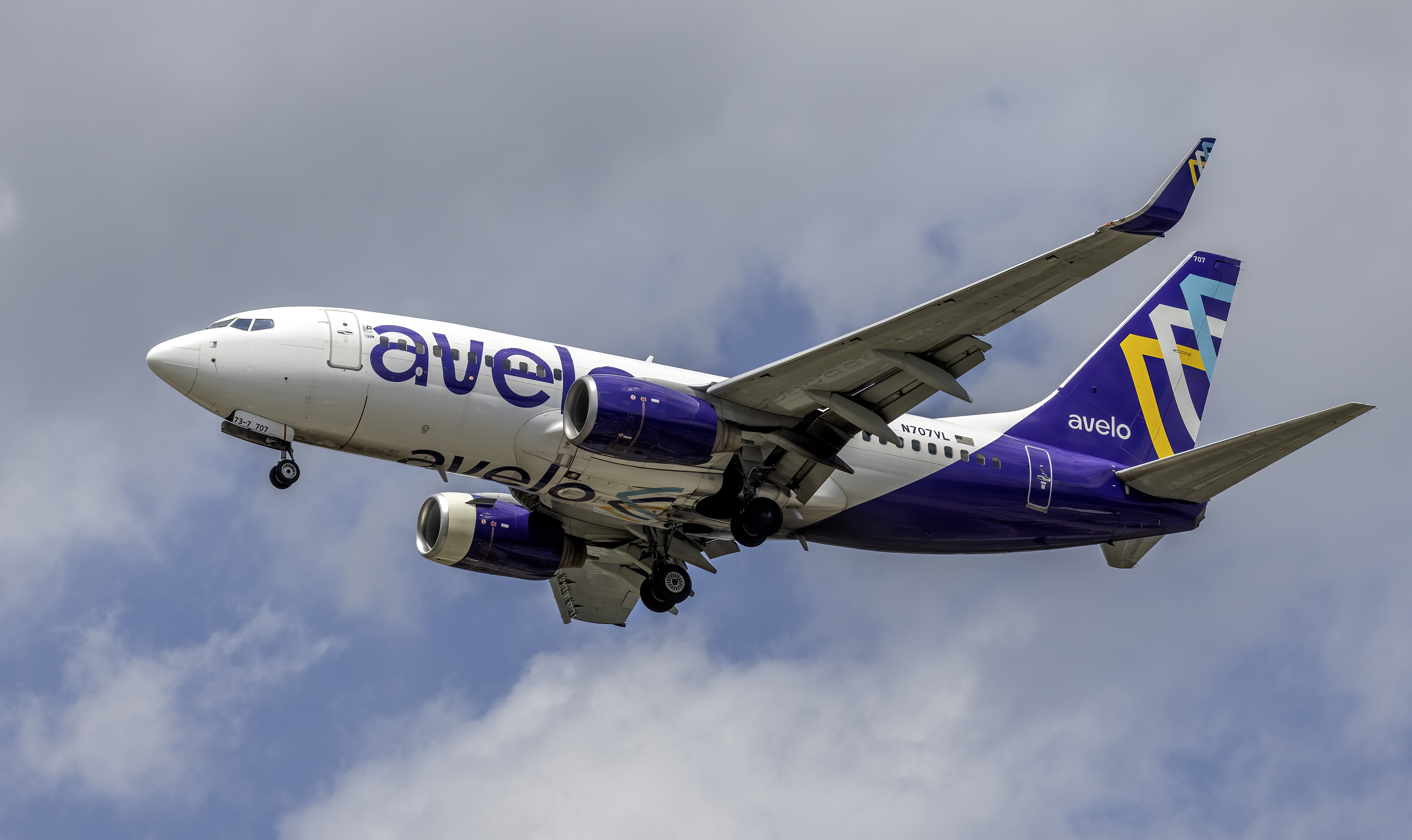
Avelo Airlines Boeing 737-700

As of April 2026, Avelo Airlines operates an all-Boeing 737 fleet composed of the following aircraft:

Aircraft	In service	Orders	Passengers	Notes
Boeing 737-700	1	—	149	
Boeing 737-800	14	—	189	
Embraer 195-E2	—	50	TBA	Order with 50 options. Deliveries begin 2028.
Total	15	50		

=== Former fleet ===
Avelo Airlines, Casino Express Airlines and Xtra Airways, previously operated these aircraft:

Aircraft	Total	Introduced	Retired	Notes
Boeing 737-700	6	2021	2026	Sold to the United States Department of Homeland Security.

== See also ==
- List of airlines of the United States
