= Royal West Airlines =

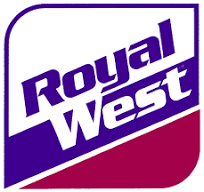

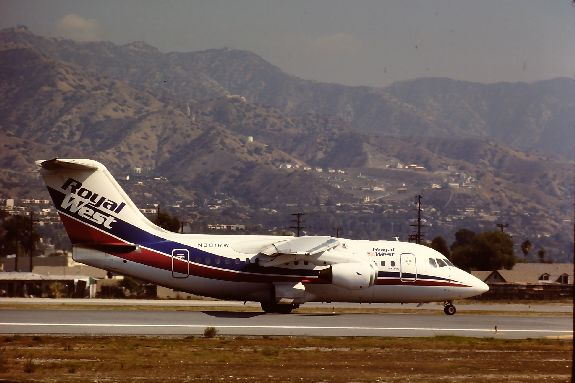
IATA	ICAO	Call sign
YM	RWE	ROYAL WEST
- Founded: 1980s
- Commenced operations: June 26 1986
- Ceased operations: February 28 1987
- Fleet size: 4
- Destinations: 3

Royal West Airlines was an airline based out of Las Vegas from 1986 to 1987 before it would go bankrupt. The airline operated a fleet of BAe 146s and marketed itself as the only airline operating non stop flights from Las Vegas to New York.

== History ==
Royal West was an airline of many iterations, the first of these iterations was from 1981 to 1982 when it merged with Aero West Airlines to form the second iteration of Royal West Airlines.

The original Royal West would utilize the Douglas DC 3 on Grand Canyon charter flights.

The second Royal West Airlines would begin operations on June 26 1986 utilizing this time the BAe 146, a regional jet commonly used by US Airlines in the 1980s.

The airline did not last much longer as on February 28 1987 the airline would cease operations only a few months after entering service.

At the time of Royal West ceasing operations it was advertising it's service from Las Vegas to New York however the service was not operated at the time, the airline was operating 13 Round trips daily between Los Angeles and Las Vegas.

== Fleet ==
Aircraft	Number of	Registartions	Notes
BAe 146	3	N803RW, N802RW, N802RW	
Boeing 727	1	N5609	Was sunk in 1993

== Destinations ==
The airline flew to the following destinations.

Country	City	Airport	Notes
United States	Burbank	-	
United States	Elko	-	
United States	Las Vegas	Harry Reid International Airport	
United States	Los Angeles	-	
United States	New York City	-	Did not start

== See also ==
List of defunct airlines of the United States
