= Green Castle Airport =

Coordinates: 41°45′18″N 91°43′40″W

Green Castle Airport (FAA LID: IA24) is a private airport northwest of Iowa City, Iowa, USA. It is a base for Green Castle Aero Club.
