= McKinney National Airport =

Airport in McKinney, Texas

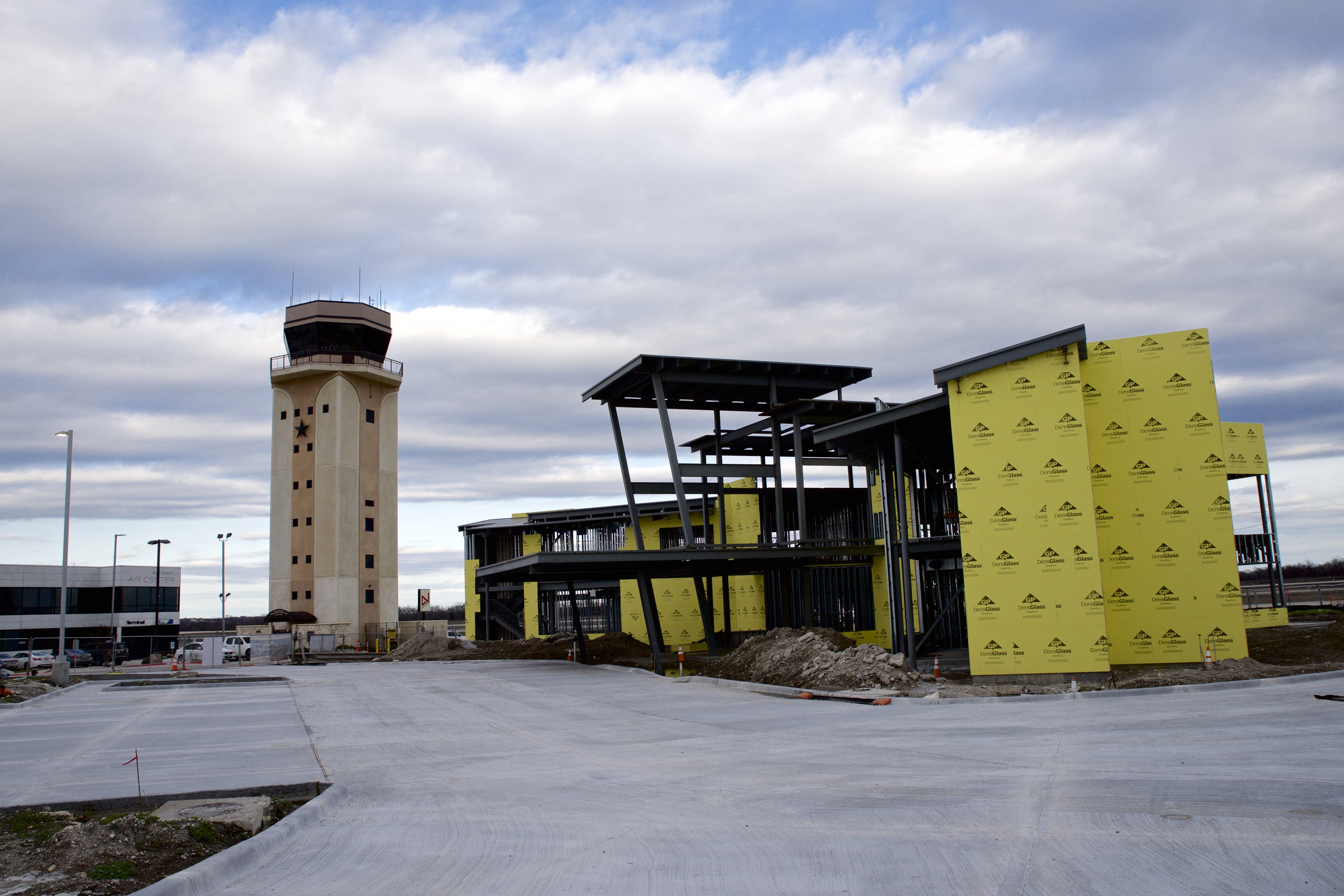
- Control tower and unfinished FBO building (2020)
- IATA: DTX; ICAO: KTKI; FAA LID: TKI

Summary
- Airport type: Public
- Owner: City of McKinney
- Serves: Dallas–Fort Worth metroplex and Texoma region
- Opened: 1979; 47 years ago
- Operating base for: Avelo Airlines
- Elevation AMSL: 589 ft (180 m)
- Coordinates: 33°10′41″N 096°35′26″W
- Website: flydtx.com

Maps
- FAA airport diagram

- Location within Texas Location within the United States

Runways
| Direction | Length | | Surface |
| Direction | ft | m | Surface |
|---|---|---|---|
| 18/36 | 7,002 | 2,134 | Concrete |

Statistics (2023)
- Aircraft operations: 142,001
- Based aircraft: 203
- Source: Federal Aviation Administration

McKinney National Airport (IATA: DTX, ICAO: KTKI, FAA LID: TKI), formerly Collin County Regional Airport at McKinney, is a general aviation airport located in McKinney, Texas, United States, about 30 miles (48 km) north of Downtown Dallas.

The airport is a reliever airport for Dallas Love Field and Dallas Fort Worth International Airport. It is owned by the City of McKinney and is home to many business aircraft, including the aircraft fleets of companies headquartered in nearby cities, such as Texas Instruments and Toyota Motor Corporation.

In 2025, city officials approved the construction of a $72 million commercial passenger terminal on the east side of the airport. The four-gate terminal opened on November 11, 2026, with flights operated by ultra-low cost carrier Avelo Airlines.

== History ==
=== Collin County Regional Airport ===
In the 1970s, the Federal Aviation Administration (FAA) proposed building the region's third major commercial airport, providing commercial air service to the fast-growing northern part of the Dallas–Fort Worth metroplex, in McKinney.

A regional airport was established in McKinney in 1979. Initially opened with a 4,000-foot (1,200 m) runway, its length was extended to 5,800 feet (1,800 m) in 1984.

In 2011, Collin County Regional Airport added a new 78-foot (24 m) tall contract FAA air traffic control tower equipped with the latest in radar, radio and voice switch technology. In 2012, a new 7,000-foot (2,100 m) long, 150-foot (46 m) wide runway was completed that can handle large aircraft with a maximum capacity of 450,000 pounds (200,000 kg).

=== McKinney National Airport ===
On November 1, 2013, the airport was purchased from Collin County by the City of McKinney for $25 million, changing the airport's name to McKinney National Airport. As part of the purchase, the city took over operations of the airport's fixed base operator (FBO), allowing the city to use fuel and service revenue for airport improvements and bond payments.

In 2018, a project to build a new executive terminal at McKinney National Airport began, which was originally slated to be completed in 2019. In September 2019, completion was delayed until 2020 as the city and the construction contractor worked on modifications to the terminal's exterior.

In 2019, the airport received a $15 million grant from the Texas Department of Transportation to extend its runway an additional 1,500 feet (460 m) to 8,500 feet (2,600 m).

==== Commercial passenger terminal ====
In 2023, the city proposed issuing $200 million in bonds which, when combined with other funding, would allow the airport to become the third major commercial airport in the metroplex. However, the bond issue was defeated at the polls, with 58.69% of voters voting against it.

In January 2025, after receiving an endorsement from the city council, the McKinney Planning and Zoning Commission approved construction of a 45,000 sq ft (4,200 m^{2}) commercial passenger terminal on the east side of the airport, designed with three gates and the ability to be expanded to five. The $72 million facility will have 1,500 parking spaces and rental car facilities. Officials said that discussions had begun with two unnamed low-cost carriers, that the terminal would initially see three to five flights a day using Boeing 737 or Airbus A320 aircraft, and that it would serve 200,000 passengers annually. Some citizens spoke out against the project, citing traffic, noise, and environmental concerns, and pointing to the rejection of the 2023 bond issue as evidence that voters were generally opposed to commercial airline operations in the city.

On February 18, 2025, the McKinney City Council awarded the pre-construction contract for the terminal project to Swinerton Builders. Funding for the project comes from local sources—including the McKinney Economic Development Corporation, the McKinney Community Development Corporation, and Tax Increment Reinvestment Zones—along with a $30M federal loan and federal and state transportation funds. Later that year, the airport received a $14.8M grant in the state budget passed by the 89th Texas Legislature, and documents obtained by The Dallas Morning News revealed that in late 2024, the city was negotiating with Avelo Airlines, which proposed to begin service in 2026 with three daily 737 flights. Airport officials said that negotiations were underway with two airlines but public discussion of the talks was blocked by nondisclosure agreements.

On December 17, 2025, the city of McKinney signed its first formal Airline Use and Lease Agreement (ULA) with Avelo Airlines.

== Facilities ==
McKinney National Airport covers 778 acres (315 ha) at an elevation of 589 feet (180 m). The concrete runway is 18/36, 7,002 feet (2,134m) long by 150 feet (46m) with a weight-bearing capacity of 450,000 pounds (200,000 kg) double tandem. It has high intensity runway lights, medium-intensity approach lights and precision approach path indicator lights for both runways, a runway 18 instrument landing system Category I approach and RNAV approaches to both 18 and 36.

The airport has vehicle rental and U.S. Customs services for international flights.

In the year ending December 31, 2023, the airport had 142,001 aircraft operations, an average of 389 per day: 93% general aviation, 6% air taxi and <1% military. 203 aircraft were then based at this airport: 144 single-engine, 26 multi-engine, 30 jet and 3 helicopter.

The airport has a contract FAA control tower open between 6:00 a.m. and 10:00 p.m.

== Airlines and destinations ==
| Airlines | Destinations |
|---|---|
| Avelo Airlines | Atlanta (begins December 16, 2026), Denver (begins December 16, 2026), Fort Lauderdale, Fort Myers, Las Vegas, Nashville (begins December 17, 2026), New Orleans (begins December 17, 2026), Orlando, Sarasota (begins December 16, 2026), Tampa, West Palm Beach (begins December 17, 2026) |

== See also ==
- List of airports in Texas
