= List of Allegiant Air destinations =

Allegiant Air's scheduled destinations (excluding charter operations) are listed below. Its reservation system does not allow travelers to book multi-segment flights (for example, Oakland to Cleveland via Phoenix even though the airline operates both sectors).

== List ==
| City | State | IATA | ICAO | Airport | Notes | Refs |
|---|---|---|---|---|---|---|
| Abilene | Texas | ABI | KABI | Abilene Regional Airport | Terminated | |
| Akron/Canton | Ohio | CAK | KCAK | Akron–Canton Airport | | |
| Albany | New York | ALB | KALB | Albany International Airport | | |
| Albuquerque | New Mexico | ABQ | KABQ | Albuquerque International Sunport | Terminated | |
| Allentown | Pennsylvania | ABE | KABE | Lehigh Valley International Airport | Operating base | |
| Amarillo | Texas | AMA | KAMA | Rick Husband Amarillo International Airport | Terminated | |
| Anchorage | Alaska | ANC | PANC | Ted Stevens Anchorage International Airport | Terminated | |
| Appleton | Wisconsin | ATW | KATW | Appleton International Airport | Operating base | |
| Asheville | North Carolina | AVL | KAVL | Asheville Regional Airport | Operating base | |
| Atlantic City | New Jersey | ACY | KACY | Atlantic City International Airport | | |
| Austin | Texas | AUS | KAUS | Austin–Bergstrom International Airport | | |
| Baltimore | Maryland | BWI | KBWI | Baltimore/Washington International Airport | Terminated | |
| Bangor | Maine | BGR | KBGR | Bangor International Airport | | |
| Belleville/St. Louis | Illinois/Missouri | BLV | KBLV | MidAmerica St. Louis Airport | | |
| Bellingham | Washington | BLI | KBLI | Bellingham International Airport | Operating base (to close November 2026) | |
| Billings | Montana | BIL | KBIL | Billings Logan International Airport | | |
| Bismarck | North Dakota | BIS | KBIS | Bismarck Municipal Airport | | |
| Bloomington | Illinois | BMI | KBMI | Central Illinois Regional Airport | | |
| Boise | Idaho | BOI | KBOI | Boise Airport | | |
| Boston | Massachusetts | BOS | KBOS | Logan International Airport | | |
| Bozeman | Montana | BZN | KBZN | Bozeman Yellowstone International Airport | | |
| Bristol | Tennessee | TRI | KTRI | Tri-Cities Regional Airport | | |
| Brownsville | Texas | BRO | KBRO | Brownsville/South Padre Island International Airport | Terminated | |
| Burbank | California | BUR | KBUR | Hollywood Burbank Airport | | |
| Burlington | Vermont | BTV | KBTV | Burlington International Airport | Terminated | |
| Casper | Wyoming | CPR | KCPR | Casper–Natrona County International Airport | Terminated | |
| Cedar Rapids | Iowa | CID | KCID | Eastern Iowa Airport | | |
| Champaign | Illinois | CMI | KCMI | University of Illinois Willard Airport | Terminated | |
| Charleston | South Carolina | CHS | KCHS | Charleston International Airport | | |
| Charlotte | North Carolina | USA | KJQF | Concord Regional Airport | | |
| Charlottesville | Virginia | CHO | KCHO | Charlottesville–Albemarle Airport | Terminated | |
| Chattanooga | Tennessee | CHA | KCHA | Chattanooga Metropolitan Airport | | |
| Chicago | Illinois | MDW | KMDW | Midway International Airport | | |
| Chicago/Rockford | Illinois | RFD | KRFD | Chicago Rockford International Airport | | |
| Cincinnati | Ohio/Kentucky | CVG | KCVG | Cincinnati/Northern Kentucky International Airport | Operating base | |
| Clarksburg | West Virginia | CKB | KCKB | North Central West Virginia Airport | | |
| Cleveland | Ohio | CLE | KCLE | Cleveland Hopkins International Airport | Terminated | |
| Colorado Springs | Colorado | COS | KCOS | Colorado Springs Airport | | |
| Columbia | Missouri | COU | KCOU | Columbia Regional Airport | Begins June 3, 2026 | |
| Columbia | South Carolina | CAE | KCAE | Columbia Metropolitan Airport | | |
| Columbus | Ohio | LCK | KLCK | Rickenbacker International Airport | | |
| Dayton | Ohio | DAY | KDAY | Dayton International Airport | | |
| Denver | Colorado | DEN | KDEN | Denver International Airport^{[S]} | | |
| Des Moines | Iowa | DSM | KDSM | Des Moines International Airport | Operating base | |
| Destin/Fort Walton Beach | Florida | VPS | KVPS | Destin–Fort Walton Beach Airport | Operating base | |
| Duluth | Minnesota | DLH | KDLH | Duluth International Airport | Terminated | |
| El Paso | Texas | ELP | KELP | El Paso International Airport | Terminated | |
| Elmira | New York | ELM | KELM | Elmira/Corning Regional Airport | | |
| Eugene | Oregon | EUG | KEUG | Eugene Airport | | |
| Evansville | Indiana | EVV | KEVV | Evansville Regional Airport | | |
| Fargo | North Dakota | FAR | KFAR | Hector International Airport | | |
| Fayetteville | Arkansas | XNA | KXNA | Northwest Arkansas Regional Airport | | |
| Flint | Michigan | FNT | KFNT | Bishop International Airport | Operating base | |
| Fort Collins | Colorado | FNL | KFNL | Northern Colorado Regional Airport | Terminated | |
| Fort Lauderdale | Florida | FLL | KFLL | Fort Lauderdale–Hollywood International Airport | Operating base | |
| Fort Myers | Florida | RSW | KRSW | Southwest Florida International Airport | | |
| Fort Wayne | Indiana | FWA | KFWA | Fort Wayne International Airport | | |
| Fresno | California | FAT | KFAT | Fresno Yosemite International Airport | | |
| Gary | Indiana | GYY | KGYY | Gary/Chicago International Airport | Terminated | |
| Grand Forks | North Dakota | GFK | KGFK | Grand Forks International Airport | | |
| Grand Island | Nebraska | GRI | KGRI | Central Nebraska Regional Airport | | |
| Grand Junction | Colorado | GJT | KGJT | Grand Junction Regional Airport | Terminated | |
| Grand Rapids | Michigan | GRR | KGRR | Gerald R. Ford International Airport | Operating base | |
| Great Falls | Montana | GTF | KGTF | Great Falls International Airport | | |
| Green Bay | Wisconsin | GRB | KGRB | Austin Straubel International Airport | Terminated | |
| Greensboro | North Carolina | GSO | KGSO | Piedmont Triad International Airport | | |
| Greenville | South Carolina | GSP | KGSP | Greenville–Spartanburg International Airport | | |
| Gulf Shores | Alabama | GUF | KJKA | Jack Edwards Airport | | |
| Gulfport | Mississippi | GPT | KGPT | Gulfport–Biloxi International Airport | Terminated | |
| Hagerstown | Maryland | HGR | KHGR | Hagerstown Regional Airport | | |
| Harrisburg | Pennsylvania | MDT | KMDT | Harrisburg International Airport | | |
| Honolulu | Hawaii | HNL | PHNL | Daniel K. Inouye International Airport | Terminated | |
| Houston | Texas | HOU | KHOU | William P. Hobby Airport | | |
| Huntington | West Virginia | HTS | KHTS | Tri-State Airport | | |
| Huntsville | Alabama | HSV | KHSV | Huntsville International Airport | | |
| Idaho Falls | Idaho | IDA | KIDA | Idaho Falls Regional Airport | | |
| Indianapolis | Indiana | IND | KIND | Indianapolis International Airport | Operating base | |
| Jackson Hole | Wyoming | JAC | KJAC | Jackson Hole Airport | Terminated | |
| Jacksonville | Florida | JAX | KJAX | Jacksonville International Airport | | |
| Kahului | Hawaii | OGG | PHOG | Kahului Airport | Terminated | |
| Kalispell | Montana | FCA | KGPI | Glacier Park International Airport | | |
| Kansas City | Missouri | MCI | KMCI | Kansas City International Airport | | |
| Key West | Florida | EYW | KEYW | Key West International Airport | | |
| Killeen | Texas | GRK | KGRK | Killeen Regional Airport | Terminated | |
| Kinston | North Carolina | ISO | KISO | Kinston Regional Jetport | Terminated | |
| Knoxville | Tennessee | TYS | KTYS | McGhee Tyson Airport | Operating base | |
| La Crosse | Wisconsin | LSE | KLSE | La Crosse Regional Airport | | |
| Lafayette | Louisiana | LFT | KLFT | Lafayette Regional Airport | Terminated | |
| Lansing | Michigan | LAN | KLAN | Capital Region International Airport | Terminated | |
| Laredo | Texas | LRD | KLRD | Laredo International Airport | | |
| Las Vegas | Nevada | LAS | KLAS | Harry Reid International Airport | Operating base | |
| Lexington | Kentucky | LEX | KLEX | Blue Grass Airport | | |
| Lincoln | Nebraska | LNK | KLNK | Lincoln Airport | Terminated | |
| Little Rock | Arkansas | LIT | KLIT | Clinton National Airport | | |
| Long Beach | California | LGB | KLGB | Long Beach Airport | Terminated | |
| Long Island/Islip | New York | ISP | KISP | Long Island Macarthur Airport | Terminated | |
| Los Angeles | California | LAX | KLAX | Los Angeles International Airport | Terminated | |
| Louisville | Kentucky | SDF | KSDF | Louisville International Airport | | |
| Madison | Wisconsin | MSN | KMSN | Dane County Regional Airport | Terminated | |
| Manhattan | Kansas | MHK | KMHK | Manhattan Regional Airport | Terminated | |
| McAllen | Texas | MFE | KMFE | McAllen Miller International Airport | | |
| Medford | Oregon | MFR | KMFR | Rogue Valley International–Medford Airport | | |
| Melbourne/Orlando | Florida | MLB | KMLB | Melbourne Orlando International Airport | | |
| Memphis | Tennessee | MEM | KMEM | Memphis International Airport | | |
| Milwaukee | Wisconsin | MKE | KMKE | Milwaukee Mitchell International Airport | Terminated | |
| Minneapolis/St. Paul | Minnesota | MSP | KMSP | Minneapolis–Saint Paul International Airport | | |
| Minot | North Dakota | MOT | KMOT | Minot International Airport | | |
| Missoula | Montana | MSO | KMSO | Missoula International Airport | | |
| Moline | Illinois | MLI | KMLI | Quad Cities International Airport | | |
| Monterey | California | MRY | KMRY | Monterey Regional Airport | | |
| Montrose | Colorado | MTJ | KMTJ | Montrose Regional Airport | Terminated | |
| Myrtle Beach | South Carolina | MYR | KMYR | Myrtle Beach International Airport | Seasonal | |
| Nashville | Tennessee | BNA | KBNA | Nashville International Airport | Operating base | |
| New Orleans | Louisiana | MSY | KMSY | Louis Armstrong New Orleans International Airport | | |
| Newark | New Jersey | EWR | KEWR | Newark Liberty International Airport | | |
| Newburgh | New York | SWF | KSWF | Stewart International Airport | | |
| Newport News | Virginia | PHF | KPHF | Newport News/Williamsburg International Airport | Terminated | |
| Niagara Falls | New York | IAG | KIAG | Niagara Falls International Airport | | |
| Norfolk | Virginia | ORF | KORF | Norfolk International Airport | | |
| Ogden | Utah | OGD | KOGD | Ogden-Hinckley Airport | Terminated | |
| Ogdensburg | New York | OGS | KOGS | Ogdensburg International Airport | Terminated | |
| Oklahoma City | Oklahoma | OKC | KOKC | Will Rogers World Airport | | |
| Omaha | Nebraska | OMA | KOMA | Eppley Airfield | | |
| Orange County/Santa Ana | California | SNA | KSNA | John Wayne Airport | | |
| Orlando | Florida | MCO | KMCO | Orlando International Airport | | |
| Orlando/Sanford | Florida | SFB | KSFB | Orlando Sanford International Airport | Operating base | |
| Owensboro | Kentucky | OWB | KOWB | Owensboro–Daviess County Regional Airport | | |
| Palm Springs | California | PSP | KPSP | Palm Springs International Airport | | |
| Pasco | Washington | PSC | KPSC | Tri-Cities Airport | | |
| Peoria | Illinois | PIA | KPIA | General Wayne A. Downing Peoria International Airport | | |
| Philadelphia | Pennsylvania | PHL | KPHL | Philadelphia International Airport | | |
| Phoenix | Arizona | PHX | KPHX | Phoenix Sky Harbor International Airport | | |
| Phoenix/Mesa | Arizona | AZA | KIWA | Phoenix–Mesa Gateway Airport | Operating base | |
| Pittsburgh | Pennsylvania | PIT | KPIT | Pittsburgh International Airport | Operating base | |
| Plattsburgh | New York | PBG | KPBG | Plattsburgh International Airport | | |
| Portland | Oregon | PDX | KPDX | Portland International Airport | | |
| Portsmouth | New Hampshire | PSM | KPSM | Portsmouth International Airport at Pease | | |
| Providence | Rhode Island | PVD | KPVD | T. F. Green Airport | | |
| Provo | Utah | PVU | KPVU | Provo Municipal Airport | Operating base | |
| Pueblo | Colorado | PUB | KPUB | Pueblo Memorial Airport | Terminated | |
| Punta Gorda | Florida | PGD | KPGD | Punta Gorda Airport | Operating base | |
| Raleigh | North Carolina | RDU | KRDU | Raleigh–Durham International Airport | Terminated | |
| Rapid City | South Dakota | RAP | KRAP | Rapid City Regional Airport | | |
| Redmond/Bend | Oregon | RDM | KRDM | Redmond Municipal Airport | Terminated | |
| Reno | Nevada | RNO | KRNO | Reno–Tahoe International Airport | Terminated | |
| Richmond | Virginia | RIC | KRIC | Richmond International Airport | | |
| Roanoke | Virginia | ROA | KROA | Roanoke–Blacksburg Regional Airport | | |
| Rochester | Minnesota | RST | KRST | Rochester International Airport | Terminated | |
| Rochester | New York | ROC | KROC | Greater Rochester International Airport | | |
| Saginaw | Michigan | MBS | KMBS | MBS International Airport | Terminated | |
| Salisbury | Maryland | SBY | KSBY | Salisbury–Ocean City–Wicomico Regional Airport | Terminated | |
| San Antonio | Texas | SAT | KSAT | San Antonio International Airport | Terminated | |
| San Diego | California | SAN | KSAN | San Diego International Airport | Terminated | |
| San Francisco | California | SFO | KSFO | San Francisco International Airport | Terminated | |
| San Juan | Puerto Rico | SJU | TJSJ | Luis Muñoz Marín International Airport | Terminated | |
| Santa Maria | California | SMX | KSMX | Santa Maria Public Airport | | |
| Santa Rosa | California | STS | KSTS | Charles M. Schulz–Sonoma County Airport | Terminated | |
| Sarasota | Florida | SRQ | KSRQ | Sarasota–Bradenton International Airport | | |
| Savannah | Georgia | SAV | KSAV | Savannah/Hilton Head International Airport | Operating base (to close November 2026) | |
| Shreveport | Louisiana | SHV | KSHV | Shreveport Regional Airport | | |
| Sioux Falls | South Dakota | FSD | KFSD | Sioux Falls Regional Airport | | |
| South Bend | Indiana | SBN | KSBN | South Bend International Airport | | |
| Spokane | Washington | GEG | KGEG | Spokane International Airport | | |
| Springfield | Illinois | SPI | KSPI | Abraham Lincoln Capital Airport | | |
| Springfield | Missouri | SGF | KSGF | Springfield–Branson National Airport | | |
| St. Cloud | Minnesota | STC | KSTC | St. Cloud Regional Airport | | |
| St. George | Utah | SGU | KSGU | St. George Regional Airport | Terminated | |
| St. Petersburg | Florida | PIE | KPIE | St. Pete–Clearwater International Airport | Operating base | |
| State College | Pennsylvania | SCE | KUNV | State College Regional Airport | Terminated | |
| Stockton | California | SCK | KSCK | Stockton Metropolitan Airport | | |
| Syracuse | New York | SYR | KSYR | Syracuse Hancock International Airport | | |
| Toledo | Ohio | TOL | KTOL | Toledo Express Airport | | |
| Topeka | Kansas | FOE | KFOE | Topeka Regional Airport | Terminated | |
| Traverse City | Michigan | TVC | KTVC | Cherry Capital Airport | | |
| Trenton | New Jersey | TTN | KTTN | Trenton–Mercer Airport | | |
| Tucson | Arizona | TUS | KTUS | Tucson International Airport | Terminated | |
| Tulsa | Oklahoma | TUL | KTUL | Tulsa International Airport | | |
| Twin Falls | Idaho | TWF | KTWF | Magic Valley Regional Airport | Terminated | |
| Washington D.C./Northern Virginia | Virginia | IAD | KIAD | Dulles International Airport | | |
| West Palm Beach | Florida | PBI | KPBI | President Donald J. Trump International Airport | | |
| Wichita | Kansas | ICT | KICT | Wichita Dwight D. Eisenhower National Airport | | |
| Wilkes-Barre | Pennsylvania | AVP | KAVP | Wilkes-Barre/Scranton International Airport | Terminated | |
| Wilmington | North Carolina | ILM | KILM | Wilmington International Airport | Terminated | |
| Worcester | Massachusetts | ORH | KORH | Worcester Regional Airport | Terminated | |
| Youngstown | Ohio | YNG | KYNG | Youngstown–Warren Regional Airport | Terminated | |
