= Minot International Airport =

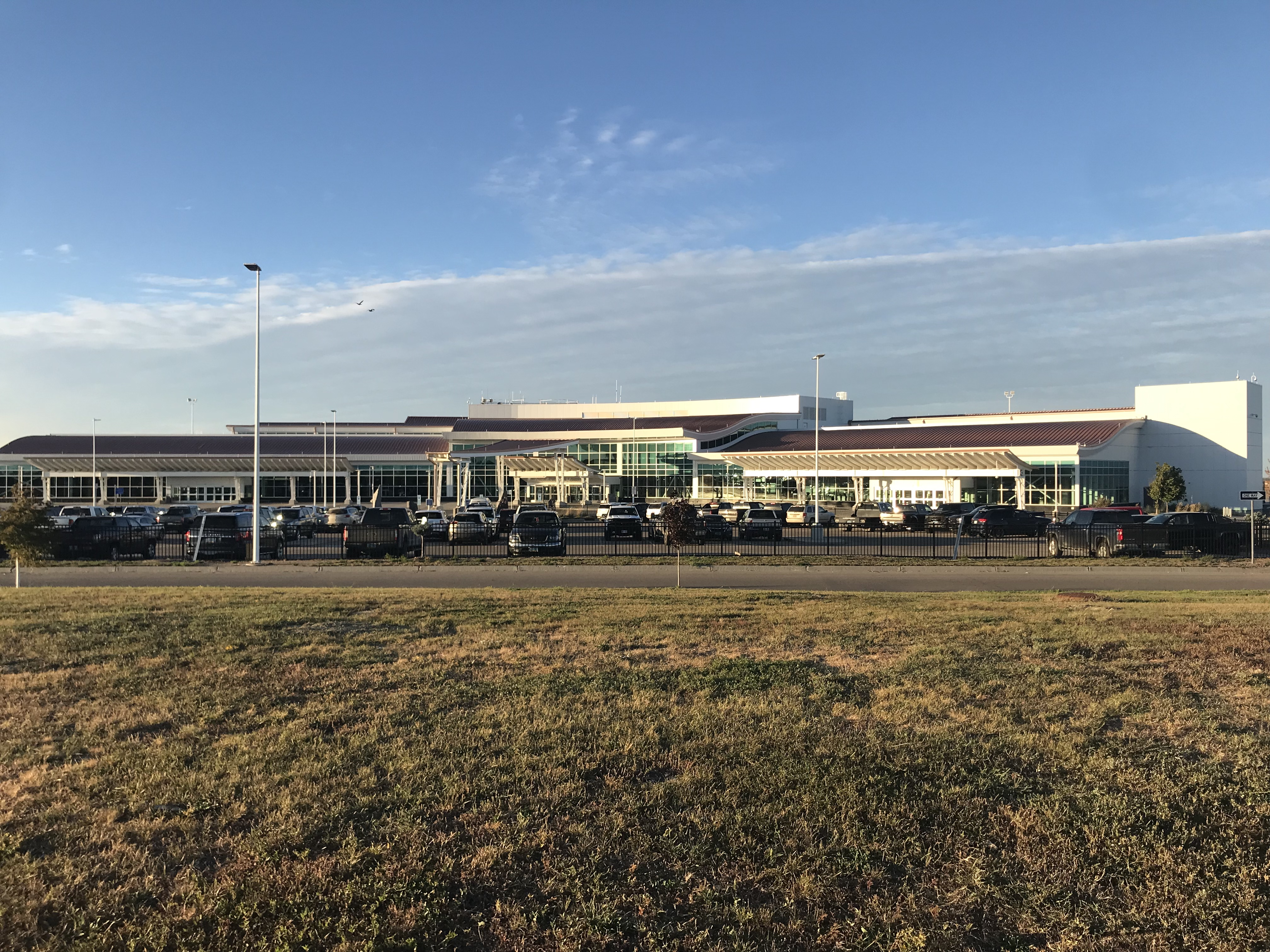
- Terminal from southwest in 2022
- IATA: MOT; ICAO: KMOT; FAA LID: MOT

Summary
- Airport type: Public
- Owner: City of Minot
- Serves: Minot, North Dakota, U.S.
- Elevation AMSL: 1,716 ft (523 m)
- Coordinates: 48°15′28″N 101°16′41″W
- Website: motairport.com

Map
- Location in the United States Location in North Dakota

Runways
Direction	Length		Surface
Direction	ft	m	Surface
13/31	7,700	2,347	Concrete
8/26	6,348	1,935	Asphalt

Statistics (2024)
- Total Passengers: 337,000
- Aircraft operations: 34,305
- Based aircraft: 128
- Source: Bureau of Transportation Statistics, Federal Aviation Administration

Minot International Airport (IATA: MOT, ICAO: KMOT, FAA LID: MOT) is in Ward County, North Dakota, United States, two miles north of the city of Minot, which owns it. The National Plan of Integrated Airport Systems for 2011–2015 categorized it as a primary commercial service airport.

MOT currently handles between ten and fifteen commercial flights a day from three airlines, as well as various charters and general aviation traffic. For many years Northwest Airlines, followed by successor Delta Air Lines, was the airport's sole commercial carrier but an economic and population boom have resulted in other carriers adding flights as well. Delta Connection, United Express, and Allegiant Air currently offer flights to Minneapolis, Denver, Phoenix/Mesa, and Las Vegas, respectively.

Minot International has no scheduled passenger airline service out of the country, but receives its international title (like many other airports) because of its customs service. Customs service is available for aircraft arriving from Canada and other countries. The Transportation Security Administration (TSA) fully searches all passengers and carry-on luggage prior to boarding, rather than using a selective process as is the case at major airports.

Delta Air Lines commands the largest percentage of MOT travelers and operates up to six daily flights to Minneapolis, all on Delta Connection.

United Airlines became Minot's second largest airline in 2010 and currently operates four daily flights to Denver. Allegiant Air became the airport's third airline in 2010, with flights to Las Vegas, then added service to Phoenix-Mesa. The number of flights to each destination fluctuates.

Frontier Airlines became the airport's fourth airline in 2012 with four flights per week to Denver. Though passenger loads were high, Frontier discontinued service from Minot in 2015 due to restructuring of the airline. The original Frontier Airlines served Minot on a route that connected it with Saskatoon, Regina, and Denver (Stapleton); bankruptcy halted that airline's operations in 1986.

== Facilities ==
The airport covers 1,563 acres (6.33 km^{2}) at an elevation of 1,716 feet (523 m) above sea level. It has two runways: 13/31 is 7,700 by 150 feet (2,347 by 46 m) feet concrete and 8/26 is 6,348 by 100 feet (1,935 by 30 m) asphalt. Its longest runway can receive Boeing 747s.

In the year ending March 30, 2023, the airport had 33,020 aircraft operations, average 90 per day: 73% general aviation, 6% airline, 6% military, and 15% air taxi. 128 aircraft were then based at this airport: 119 single-engine, 6 multi-engine, 1 jet, and 2 helicopter.

In 2013, aircraft operations dropped to 32,023 for the fiscal year. Itinerant general aviation operations is still the highest percentage of operations with 10,429. Air carrier is at 6,825 and air taxi is at 5,201. Finally, for itinerant operations, military made up 283. Local operations include 6,898 civil and 2,387 military operations. Based aircraft has dropped to 112 housed aircraft.

Avflight is the fixed-base operator at the airport, offering a 24 hour fueling station for quick turns and efficient technology stops. Other services include catering, Customs, international garbage disposal, and rental cars.

Minot Aero Center is a maintenance business at the airport, offering flight training, maintenance, and general aircraft services.

== Historical airline service ==
Braniff Airways started service in 1952 with one daily departure south to Bismarck with DC-3 equipment. The original Frontier Airlines started new service on May 1, 1959, with three daily departures to Bismarck on 26 passenger DC-3s. North Central Airlines had four daily departures in July 1960 on DC-3 equipment; the service went to Bismarck and Devils Lake, east of Minot. North Central became Republic in 1979, Northwest in 1986, and Delta in 2010.

== Airlines and destinations ==
=== Passenger ===
Airlines	Destinations	Refs
Allegiant Air	Las Vegas, Phoenix/Mesa	
Delta Connection	Minneapolis/St. Paul	
United Express	Denver	

== Statistics ==
Top domestic destinations from MOT (February 2025 – January 2026)
Rank	Airport	Passengers	Airline
1	Minneapolis-St. Paul, Minnesota	81,920	Delta
2	Denver, Colorado	52,390	United
3	Phoenix-Mesa, Arizona	22,710	Allegiant
4	Las Vegas, Nevada	16,260	Allegiant
5	Orlando-Sanford, Florida	3,220	Allegiant
6	Houston-Intercontinental, Texas	1,020	United

== Growth and future ==
Usage statistics
Year	Total passengers	Percentage change
2003	71,134	Steady
2004	74,063	▲4.12%
2005	76,128	▲2.79%
2006	74,929	▼1.57%
2007	70,871	▼5.42%
2008	71,143	▲0.38%
2009	66,873	▼6.00%
2010	90,210	▲34.90%
2011	148,959	▲65.12%
2012	221,188	▲48.49%
2013	219,285	▼0.86%
2014	218,618	▼0.30%
2015	179,067	▼18.09%
2016	148,814	▼16.89%
2017	138,920	▼6.65%
2018	147,727	▲6.34%
2019	162,840	▲10.23%
2020	84,669	▼48.00%
2021	253,000	▲198.81%
2022	278,000	▲9.88%
2023	293,000	▲5.39%
2024	337,000	▲15.02%

Minot's growth in population and economy, along with the enormous influx of workers and residents due to the Bakken oil boom in western North Dakota, have increased air passenger numbers tremendously. Though Minot is the fourth largest city in North Dakota, the airport is now the third-busiest. Located at the southwest corner of the property, the early 1990s terminal was designed for roughly 100,000 passengers, and became undersized after just two decades. This resulted in makeshift changes such as temporary long term parking, additional hold-room areas, and other similar measures.

Minot's forecasted growth over the next twenty years warranted a study to identify alternatives to deal with that growth, and the best option was a new terminal directly east of the 1991 terminal; its predecessor was on the west side of the property, near 24th Avenue NW and just east of North Broadway (US 83). Design of the current terminal building was completed in May 2013, and included four to six gates, room for up to four car rental companies, additional restaurant space, additional check in areas for future new airlines, and greatly expanded parking facilities for short term, long term, and rental car parking.

Growing passenger numbers, parking issues, and the possibilities of new airlines and destinations made a new terminal at Minot International Airport a top priority. The projected $40 million terminal joined a list of other major improvements over the next three years which include additional apron, a new taxiway, a new Snow Removal Equipment building, additional parking and a new access road, with total investment around $98 million to cope with increased traffic.

Four times the size of its predecessor, the 121,000-square-foot (11,200 m^{2}) new terminal opened on February 29, 2016. The old terminal building was demolished that November, after the city voted to demolish the structure after the new terminal was completed. There is no definite plan for the area after the demolition, but the city is considering a car rental facility as a frontrunner to be built in the old terminal's place.

== Ground Transportation ==
Minot City Transit buses do not directly serve the terminal, however, buses do travel along 3rd Street Northeast and Airport Road, where passengers may flag down any bus at an intersection.

== Accidents and incidents ==
- July 20, 2025: SkyWest flight 3788 from Minneapolis, Minnesota to Minot, North Dakota was forced to make an "aggressive maneuver" after a B-52 came dangerously close to the flight. The plane had been cleared to land at MOT when the pilot executed a sharp turn to prevent a possible collision with the B-52 bomber, and was later able to land safely at MOT after circling the airport a few times. The B-52 had flown from Minot Air Force Base to conduct a flypast at the North Dakota State Fair.

== See also ==
- Dakota Territory Air Museum
- List of airports in North Dakota
- Minot Air Force Base
- North Dakota World War II Army Airfields
