= Allegiant Travel Company =

American travel and hospitality company

- Type: Public
- Traded as: Nasdaq: ALGT; S&P 600 component
- Industry: Tourism
- Founded: 1999; 27 years ago
- Headquarters: Summerlin, Nevada, United States
- Key people: Greg Anderson (CEO); Maury Gallagher (chair); Robert Neal (president and CFO)
- Revenue: ▲US$2.6 billion (2025)
- Operating income: ▲US$37 million (2025)
- Net income: ▼US$(45) million (2025)
- Total assets: US$4.2 billion (2025)
- Total equity: US$1.1 billion (2025)
- Number of employees: ▼5,616 (2025)
- Subsidiaries: Allegiant Air; Sun Country Airlines
- Website: allegiantair.com
- Footnotes; Financials as of December 31, 2025. References

The Allegiant Travel Company is an American airline holding and hospitality company headquartered in Las Vegas, Nevada. The company owns Allegiant Air and Sun Country Airlines.

== History ==
The Allegiant Travel Company was founded in 1999 as the parent company of Allegiant Air, which itself had been founded in 1997. Initially based out of Fresno, California, the company reorganized in 2000 with Maurice J. Gallagher Jr. gaining an almost 20 percent stake in the company. He had previously been a prominent creditor of Allegiant and was one of the co-founders of ValuJet Airlines.

In May 2006, Allegiant Travel Company filed plans for an initial public offering (IPO). It officially began trading on the Nasdaq exchange under the stock ticker symbol, ALGT, in December of that year.

By 2024, Allegiant Travel's primary subsidiary, Allegiant Air, had switched from a fleet predominately composed of MD-80s to one exclusively composed of Airbus and Boeing jets.

In January 2026, Allegiant Travel Company announced an agreement to acquire Sun Country Airlines in a cash-and-stock transaction valued at about $1.5 billion. The United States Department of Transportation approved the merger on April 15, 2026, and shareholders of both airlines approved the transaction on May 8, 2026. Following the merger, Allegiant shareholders would own approximately 67 percent of the combined company, while Sun Country shareholders would own the remaining 33 percent. The transaction closed on May 13, 2026. Allegiant and Sun Country will continue to operate separately while working toward a single operating certificate.

== Business trends ==
The key trends for the Allegiant Travel Company (including its consolidated subsidiaries) are (financial years ending December 31):

	2014	2015	2016	2017	2018	2019	2020	2021	2022	2023	2024	2025
Revenue (in million US$)	1,137	1,262	1,379	1,511	1,667	1,841	990	1,707	2,301	2,509	2,513	2,607
Net income (in million US$)	87	220	220	198	161	232	(184)	152	3	118	(240)	(45)
Employees (FTE)	2,411	2,846	3,416	3,752	3,901	4,363	3,863	4,458	5,306	5,643	5,991	5,616
Passengers (in millions)	8.2	9.5	11.1	12.3	13.8	15.0	8.6	13.6	16.8	17.3	16.8	18.5
Load factor (%)	87.5	85.0	85.0	83.7	84.7	83.9	59.5	70.3	85.0	85.9	83.6	82.0
Aircraft			84	89	76	91	95	108	121	126	123	123
Notes/sources							(Note: 2020: Activities and income in fiscal 2020 were severely reduced by the impact of the coronavirus pandemic)					

== Subsidiaries ==
=== Allegiant Air ===
Allegiant Air was founded in 1997 and is the ninth-largest commercial airline in the United States as of January 2020. Part of Allegiant Air's business model includes earning commissions by selling passengers ancillary items like rental cars, hotel rooms, tickets to events, amusement park passes, and other add-ons. The airline has a fleet composed of 126 Airbus and Boeing jets that serves more than 500 routes across the country.

=== Sun Country Airlines ===
Sun Country Airlines has operated since 1983. Originally founded as a charter airline, Sun Country began scheduled passenger service out of Minneapolis–Saint Paul in 1995. After going public for the first time in 2021 under the leadership of CEO Jude Bricker, the airline expanded to a fleet of more than 65 aircraft, serving scheduled passenger routes primarily from its Minneapolis hub while also operating cargo flights for Amazon. In early 2026, Allegiant Travel Company and Sun Country reached an agreement for Allegiant to acquire the airline for $1.5 billion. The transaction closed on May 13, 2026, bringing Sun Country under the Allegiant Travel Company umbrella.

=== Other ===
The Allegiant Travel Company also counts the golf course management software firm, Teesnap, as one of its subsidiaries. The company was founded in 2013 and has been owned by Allegiant since its outset. The firm's software was being used by 590 golf courses as of November 2023, but was also looking for a buyer for the subsidiary as of the same date. Another Allegiant subsidiary, Game Plane, created an eponymous game show that was filmed on Allegiant Air flights, which ran during 2014 and 2015 on the Discovery Family Channel. Allegiant Travel also operated an information technology company called Allegiant Systems that had the goal of selling software systems to other airlines.

Allegiant Travel formerly operated family entertainment centers in Utah and Michigan. Known as Allegiant Nonstop, the company closed the centers in 2020.

The company also built and briefly operated Sunseeker Resort in Charlotte County, Florida, which it intended to be the first in a chain. Plans for the inaugural Sunseeker Resort Charlotte Harbor were announced in August 2017. Construction on the project was initially halted due to the COVID-19 pandemic, but resumed in 2021 with plans for the 500 room, 180 extended-stay suite resort. The resort opened on December 15, 2023. On September 4, 2025, Allegiant Travel Company sold the resort to the Blackstone, an investment firm that strategically acquires and manages "troubled assets", for $200 million, which will operate the resort under Hilton's Curio Collection brand.

== Sponsorships ==
The Allegiant Travel Company is the official sponsor of several sports teams and venues.

=== Allegiant Stadium ===
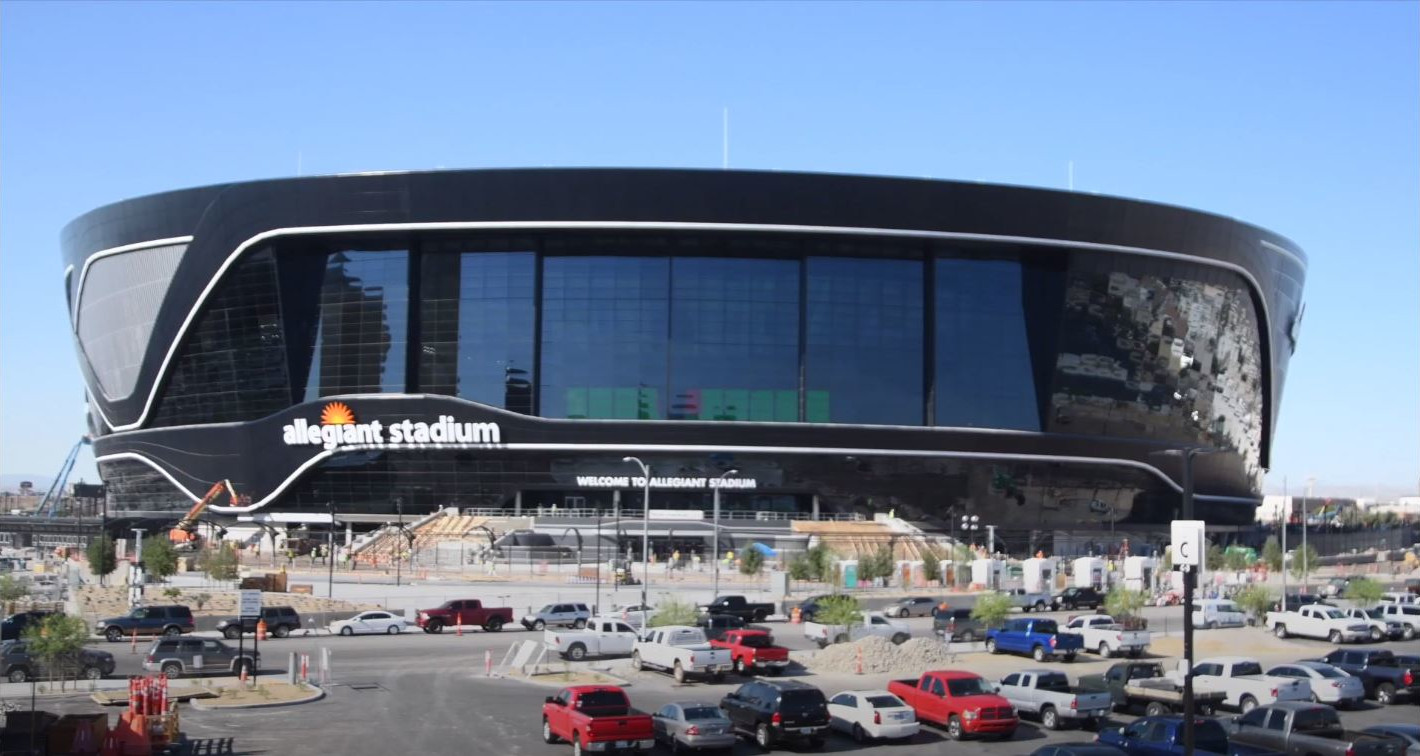
Allegiant Stadium under construction, June 2020

In August 2019, Allegiant was awarded the naming rights for the home of the Las Vegas Raiders and the UNLV Rebels football team, Allegiant Stadium. It is also the official airline of the Raiders.

=== Other sport sponsorships ===
In July 2018, Allegiant was named the official airline of Minor League Baseball (MiLB). In December of that year, it announced a credit card partnership with the MiLB that would allow Allegiant credit card holders to earn points in relation to their local baseball teams and communities.

Allegiant is also the official domestic airline partner of the Vegas Golden Knights. In September 2019, the company unveiled a Golden Knights-themed plane that featured a livery with the team's logo. In January 2020, Allegiant signed a deal to become the official airline of the Indianapolis Colts, and the following year became the official airline of the Pac-12 Conference.

== See also ==
- List of Allegiant Air destinations
- List of S&P 600 companies
