= Grand Forks Airport =

Grand Forks Airport may refer to:

- Grand Forks Airport, an airport in Grand Forks, British Columbia
- Grand Forks International Airport, an airport in Grand Forks, North Dakota
- Grand Forks Municipal Airport, a former airport in Grand Forks, North Dakota
