= List of NASCAR Truck Series champions =

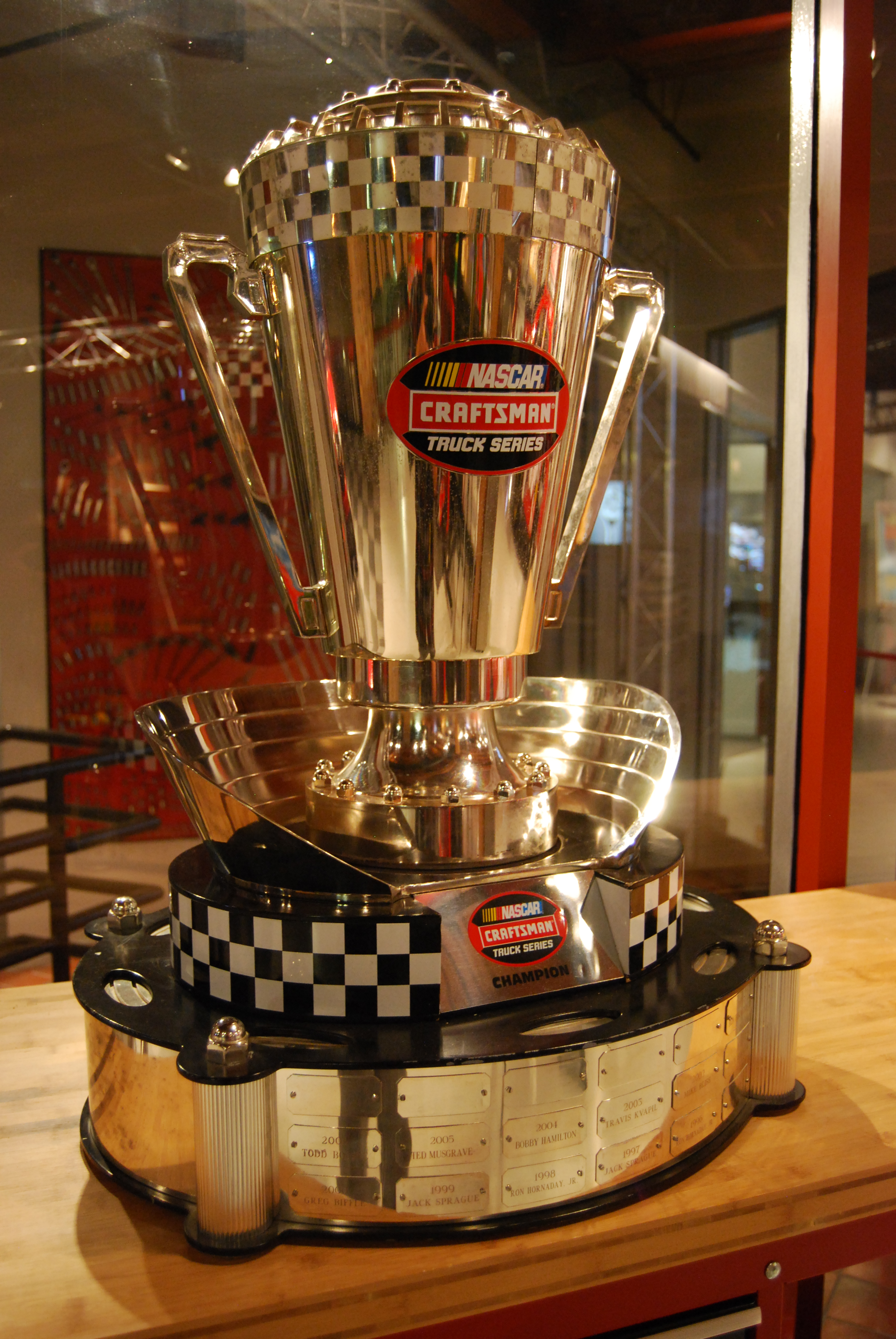
The Truck Series championship trophy during the first Craftsman Truck Series era

The NASCAR Truck Series Drivers' Championship is awarded by the chairman of NASCAR to the most successful NASCAR Craftsman Truck Series racing car driver over a season, as determined by a points system based on race results. The Drivers' Championship was first awarded in 1995 to Mike Skinner. The first driver to win multiple Championships was Ron Hornaday Jr., in 1996 and 1998. The most recent Drivers' Champion is Kaden Honeycutt who won his first championship in 2026.

Overall, 23 different drivers have won the Championship, with Ron Hornaday Jr. holding the record for most titles at four. Crafton has the record for most consecutive Drivers' Championships, winning two from 2013 to 2014. Erik Jones is the youngest driver to claim the NASCAR Truck Series Championship, being 19 years, 5 months, and 21 days old when he won the 2015 title. Hornaday is the oldest winner of the NASCAR Truck Series Title; he was 51 years, 4 months and 24 days old when he won the 2009 championship.

== By season ==
Points Format History: List of NASCAR points scoring systems NASCAR playoffs

Season	Driver	Owner	No.	Manufacturer	St	Ws	TT	P	Pts	Gap
Full Season Points
1995	Mike Skinner	Richard Childress	3	Chevrolet	20	8	18	10	3224	126
1996	Ron Hornaday Jr. (1)	Dale Earnhardt	16	Chevrolet (2)	24	4	23	2	3831	53
1997	Jack Sprague (1)	Rick Hendrick	24	Chevrolet (3)	26	3	23	5	3969	232
1998	Ron Hornaday Jr. (2)	Dale Earnhardt (2)	16	Chevrolet (4)	27	6	22	2	4072	3
1999	Jack Sprague (2)	Rick Hendrick (2)	24	Chevrolet (5)	25	3	19	1	3747	8
2000	Greg Biffle	Jack Roush	50	Ford	24	5	18	4	3826	230
2001	Jack Sprague (3)	Rick Hendrick (3)	24	Chevrolet (6)	24	4	17	7	3670	73
2002	Mike Bliss	Steve Coulter	16	Chevrolet (7)	25	5	18	4	3359	46
2003	Travis Kvapil	Steve Coulter (2)	16	Chevrolet (8)	25	1	22	0	3837	9
2004	Bobby Hamilton	Bobby Hamilton	4	Dodge	25	4	16	0	3624	46
2005	Ted Musgrave	Jim Smith (2)	1	Dodge (2)	25	1	15	1	3535	55
2006	Todd Bodine (1)	Stephen Germain	30	Toyota	25	3	16	1	3666	127
2007	Ron Hornaday Jr. (3)	Kevin Harvick	33	Chevrolet (9)	25	4	22	1	3982	54
2008	Johnny Benson	Bill Davis	23	Toyota (2)	25	5	18	3	3725	7
2009	Ron Hornaday Jr. (4)	Kevin Harvick (2)	33	Chevrolet (10)	25	6	20	4	3959	187
2010	Todd Bodine (2)	Stephen Germain (2)	30	Toyota (3)	25	4	20	2	3937	207
2011	Austin Dillon	Richard Childress (2)	3	Chevrolet (11)	25	2	16	5	888	6
2012	James Buescher	Steve Turner	31	Chevrolet (12)	22	4	14	0	808	6
2013	Matt Crafton (1)	Duke Thorson	88	Toyota (4)	22	1	19	0	804	40
2014	Matt Crafton (2)	Duke Thorson (2)	88	Toyota (5)	22	2	17	0	833	21
2015	Erik Jones	Kyle Busch	4	Toyota (6)	23	3	19	5	899	15
3 Round Elimination Playoff format
2016	Johnny Sauter	Maurice J. Gallagher Jr.	21	Chevrolet (13)	23	3	19	1	4030	4
2017	Christopher Bell	Kyle Busch (2)	4	Toyota (7)	23	5	21	5	4035	1
2018	Brett Moffitt	Shigeaki Hattori	16	Toyota (8)	23	6	13	0	4040	6
2019	Matt Crafton (3)	Duke Thorson (3)	88	Ford (2)	23	0	18	3	4035	2
2020	Sheldon Creed	Maurice J. Gallagher Jr. (2)	2	Chevrolet (14)	23	5	13	4	4040	5
2021	Ben Rhodes (1)	Duke Thorson (4)	99	Toyota (9)	22	2	16	0	4034	2
2022	Zane Smith	Bob Jenkins	38	Ford (3)	23	4	19	3	4040	5
2023	Ben Rhodes (2)	Duke Thorson (5)	99	Ford (4)	23	1	14	0	4032	1
2024	Ty Majeski	Mike Curb	98	Ford (5)	23	3	14	6	4040	5
2025	Corey Heim	David Gilliland	11	Toyota (10)	25	12	21	10	4040	5
7 race Chase format
2026	Kaden Honeycutt	David Gilliland (2)	11	Toyota (11)	25	5	19	3	2471	83

== By driver ==
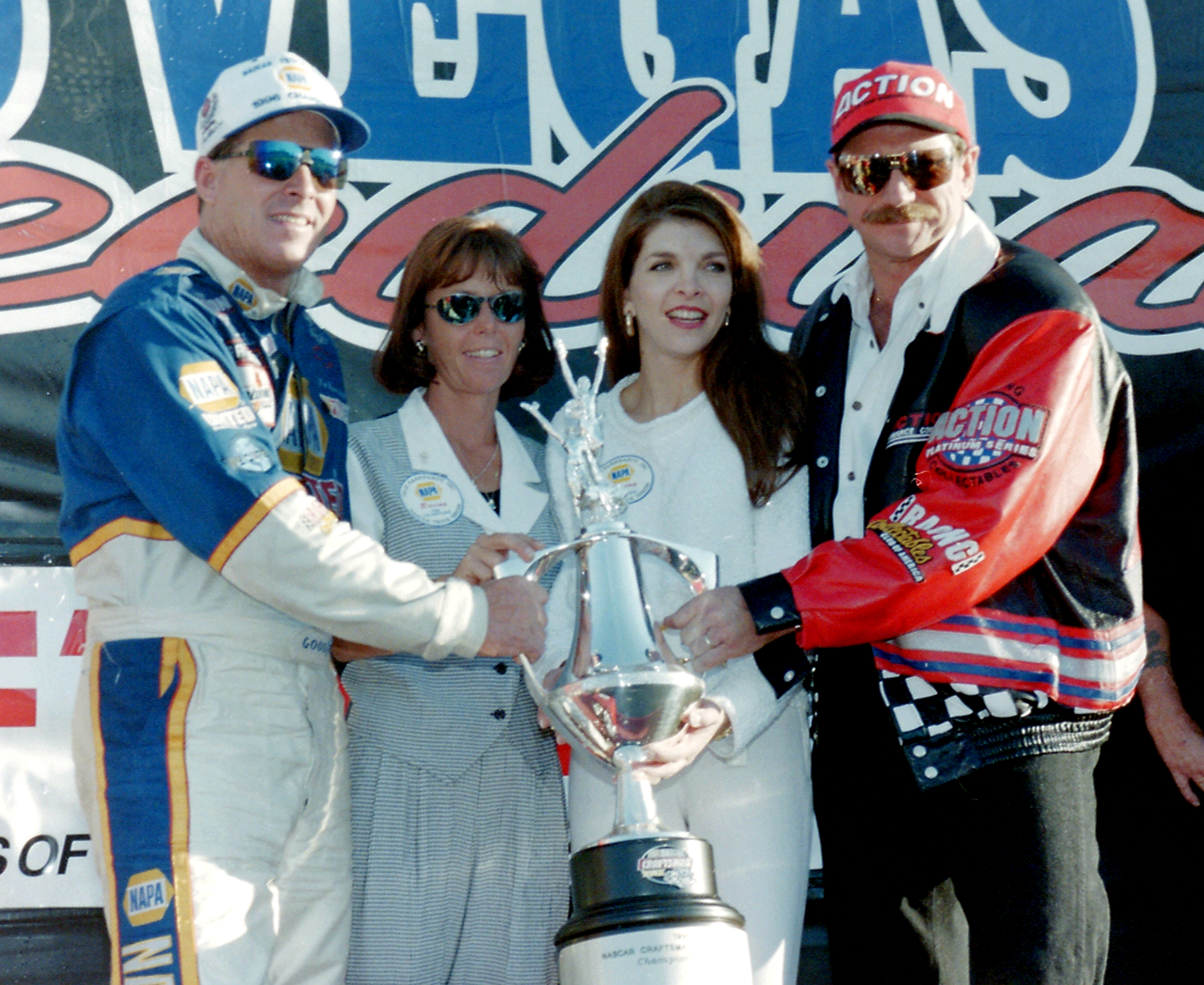
Ron Hornaday Jr. celebrates the first of his four Truck Series titles in 1996

Driver	Total	Seasons
Ron Hornaday Jr.	4	1996, 1998, 2007, 2009
Jack Sprague	3	1997, 1999, 2001
Matt Crafton	3	2013, 2014, 2019
Todd Bodine	2	2006, 2010
Ben Rhodes	2	2021, 2023
Mike Skinner	1	1995
Greg Biffle	1	2000
Mike Bliss	1	2002
Travis Kvapil	1	2003
Bobby Hamilton	1	2004
Ted Musgrave	1	2005
Johnny Benson	1	2008
Austin Dillon	1	2011
James Buescher	1	2012
Erik Jones	1	2015
Johnny Sauter	1	2016
Christopher Bell	1	2017
Brett Moffitt	1	2018
Sheldon Creed	1	2020
Zane Smith	1	2022
Ty Majeski	1	2024
Corey Heim	1	2025
Kaden Honeycutt	1	2026

== Regular season champions ==
From 2017–2025, NASCAR has awarded a regular season championship to the driver with the most points heading into the playoffs.

Season	Driver	Owner/Team	Number	Manufacturer
2017	Christopher Bell	Kyle Busch (Kyle Busch Motorsports)	4	Toyota
2018	Johnny Sauter	Maury Gallagher (GMS Racing)	21	Chevrolet
2019	Grant Enfinger	Mike Curb (ThorSport Racing)	98	Ford
2020	Austin Hill	Shigeaki Hattori (Hattori Racing Enterprises)	16	Toyota
2021	John Hunter Nemechek	Kyle Busch (Kyle Busch Motorsports)	4	Toyota
2022	Zane Smith	Bob Jenkins (Front Row Motorsports)	38	Ford
2023	Corey Heim	David Gilliland (Tricon Garage)	11	Toyota
2024	Christian Eckes	Bill McAnally (McAnally–Hilgemann Racing)	19	Chevrolet
2025	Corey Heim (2)	David Gilliland (Tricon Garage)	11	Toyota

== See also ==
- NASCAR
- NASCAR Craftsman Truck Series
- List of NASCAR Cup Series champions
- List of NASCAR O'Reilly Auto Parts Series champions
- List of NASCAR teams
- List of NASCAR tracks
