= North Dakota World War II Army Airfields =

North Dakota World War II Army Airfields
- Part of World War II

Site information
- Type: Army Airfields

Location
- Map Of North Dakota World War II Army Airfields

Site history
- Built: 1940-1944
- In use: 1940-present

During World War II, the United States Army Air Forces (USAAF) established numerous airfields in North Dakota for training pilots and aircrews of USAAF fighters and bombers.

Most of these airfields were under the command of Second Air Force or the Army Air Forces Training Command (AAFTC). However the other USAAF support commands (Air Technical Service Command (ATSC); Air Transport Command (ATC) or Troop Carrier Command) commanded a significant number of airfields in a support roles.

It is still possible to find remnants of these wartime airfields. Many were converted into municipal airports, some were returned to agriculture and several were retained as United States Air Force installations and were front-line bases during the Cold War. Hundreds of the temporary buildings that were used survive today, and are being used for other purposes.

== Major airfields ==
Air Transport Command

- Bismarck MAP, Bismarck

Joint use USAAF/Civil Airport
Now: Bismarck Municipal Airport (IATA: BIS, ICAO: KBIS, FAA LID: BIS)

- Fargo MAP, Fargo

Joint use USAAF/Civil Airport
Now: Hector International Airport (IATA: FAR, ICAO: KFAR, FAA LID: FAR)
And: Fargo Air National Guard Base

- Port O'Minot, Minot, North Dakota

Joint use US Navy/USAAF/Civil Airport
Now: Minot International Airport (IATA: MOT, ICAO: KMOT, FAA LID: MOT)

Note: Minot Air Force Base (1957-Present) is NOT this facility.

Army Air Force Training Command

- Grand Forks Municipal Airport, Grand Forks

Joint use USAAF/Civil Airport
Contract Pilot School
Non aviation use, redeveloped and part of urban area of Grand Forks.

Note: Grand Forks Air Force Base (1957-Present) is NOT this facility.
