= Gemini Air Cargo =

American cargo airline

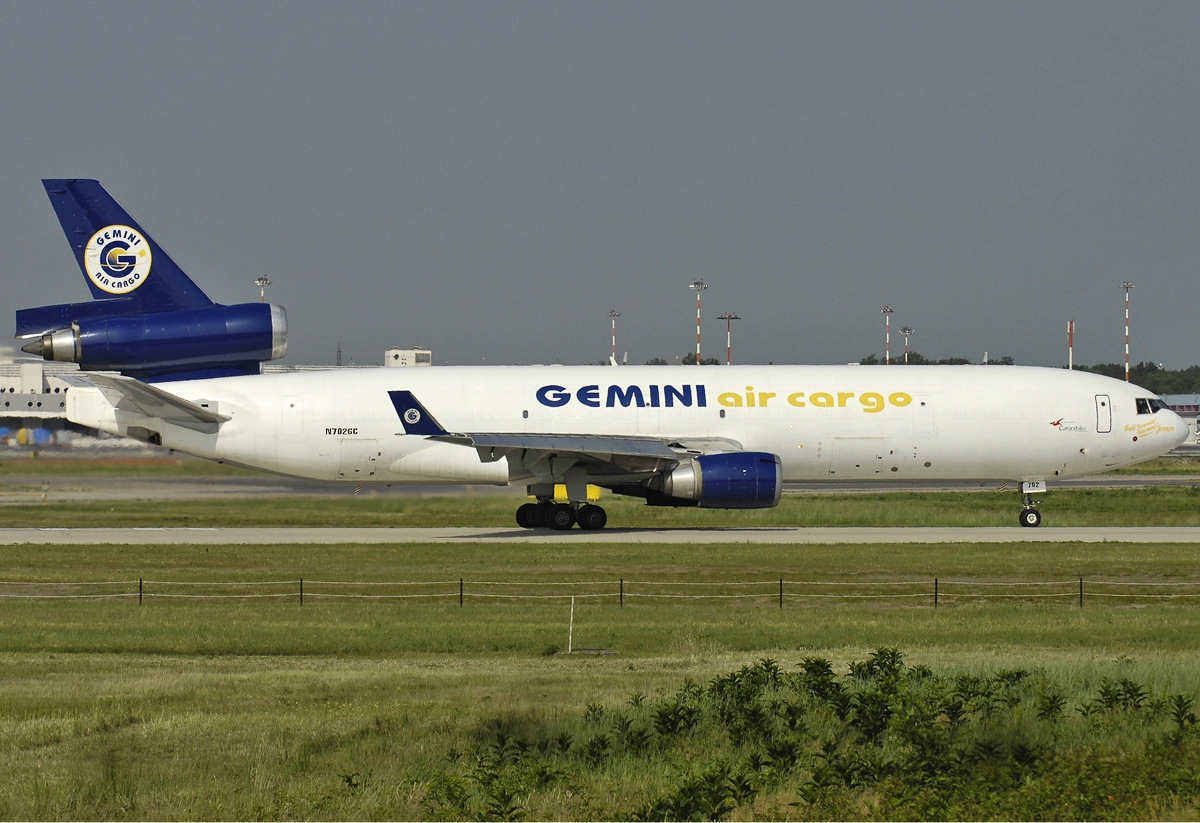
- A Gemini Air Cargo Douglas MD11F at the Milan Malpensa Airport in 2007
IATA	ICAO	Call sign
GR	GCO	GEMINI
- Founded: December 1995; 30 years ago
- Ceased operations: August 12, 2008; 18 years ago
- Hubs: Miami International Airport; John F. Kennedy International Airport
- Fleet size: 15
- Destinations: 16
- Headquarters: Dulles, Virginia, United States
- Key people: Sam Woodward - Chairman, President, & C.E.O. Ahmad R. Zamany - Senior Vice President, C.O.O.
- Website: Official website

Gemini Air Cargo was an American ACMI (Aircraft, Crew, Maintenance, & Insurance) cargo airline headquartered in Dulles, Virginia, United States. It operated worldwide cargo schedules and charters on a wet-lease basis.

Its main bases were Miami International Airport and John F. Kennedy International Airport, New York.

== History ==
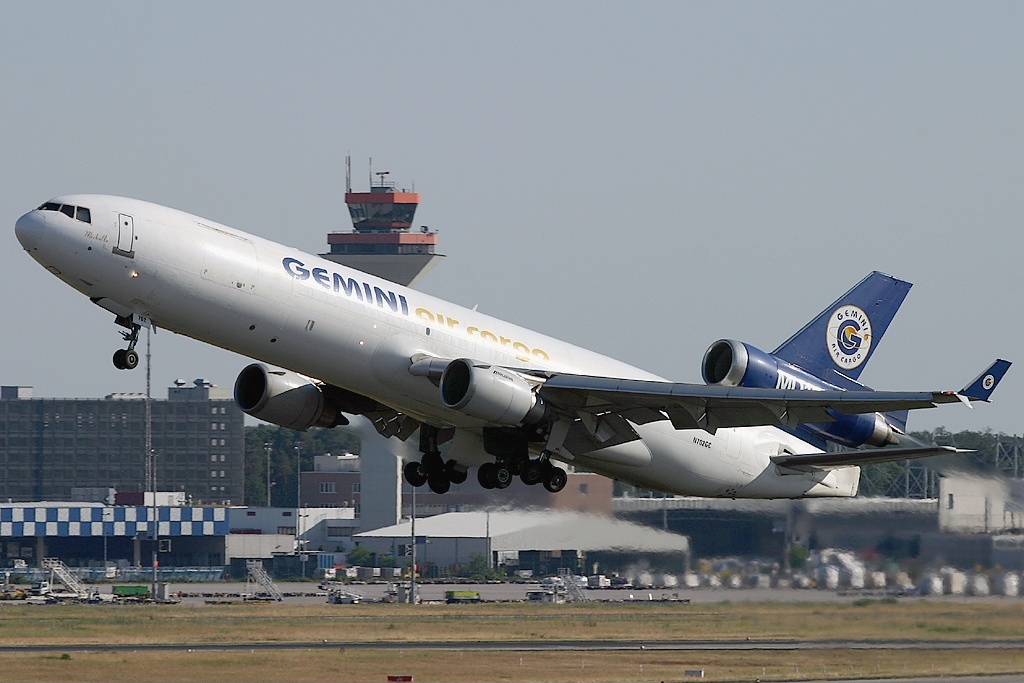
A Gemini Air Cargo Douglas MD-11F at the Frankfurt Airport in 2005

The airline was established in December 1995 by William Stockbridge, with financial backing from Lehman Brothers and Green Tree Capital. It began operations as an ACMI (Aircraft, Crews, Maintenance, Insurance) using DC-10-30F aircraft which were obtained from Lufthansa and converted to cargo configuration by Aeronavali in Venice. Prior to obtaining its own FAR Part 121 certificate, Gemini operated with crews from Sun Country Airlines under Sun Country's certificate for several months before certification in October 1996.

In July 1999 the airline was acquired by The Carlyle Group. In August 2006 the airline emerged from bankruptcy reorganization in a debt restructuring involving a DIP (debtor in position) and exchange of debt for equity with Bayside Capital. Bayside had pledged to grow Gemini and take advantage of the fast-growing cargo market into the next two decades.

However, in the early summer of 2008 Gemini filed again for bankruptcy protection. The reasons were to be found in the sudden oil price increase that hit hard the thirsty McDonnell Douglas DC-10-30F fleet and the 2008 financial crisis.

Gemini Air Cargo ceased operations the evening of August 12, 2008, and the airline later confirmed that month it was in liquidation.

As of December 2008, Gemini Air Cargo was purchased by Gemini Worldwide Holdings LLC with plans to start a new cargo/passenger service as Gemini Worldwide Airways. Operations have not started as of mid 2015.

== Destinations ==
Gemini Air Cargo operated the following scheduled flights (as of January 2005):

=== National ===
Anchorage, Cincinnati, Columbus, Los Angeles, Miami, and New York City

=== International ===
Brussels, Frankfurt, Guayaquil, Hong Kong, Medellín, Nottingham, Quito, Sapporo, Seoul, and Taipei

== Fleet ==
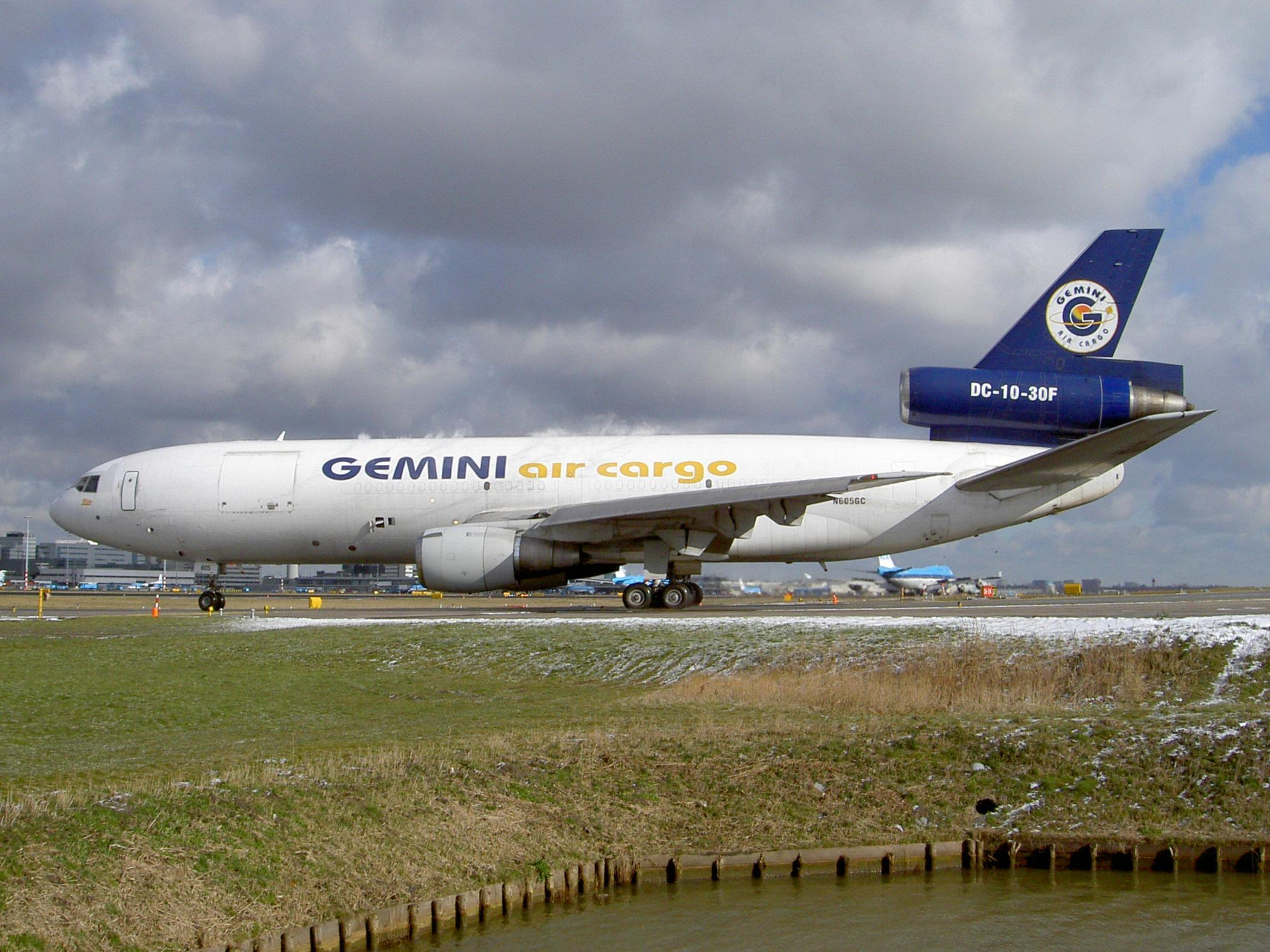
Gemini Air Cargo McDonnell Douglas DC-10-30F

The Gemini Air Cargo fleet consisted of:

- 12 McDonnell Douglas DC-10-30F
- 4 McDonnell Douglas MD-11F

== See also ==
- List of defunct airlines of the United States
