= Allegiant Air =

American ultra-low-cost airline

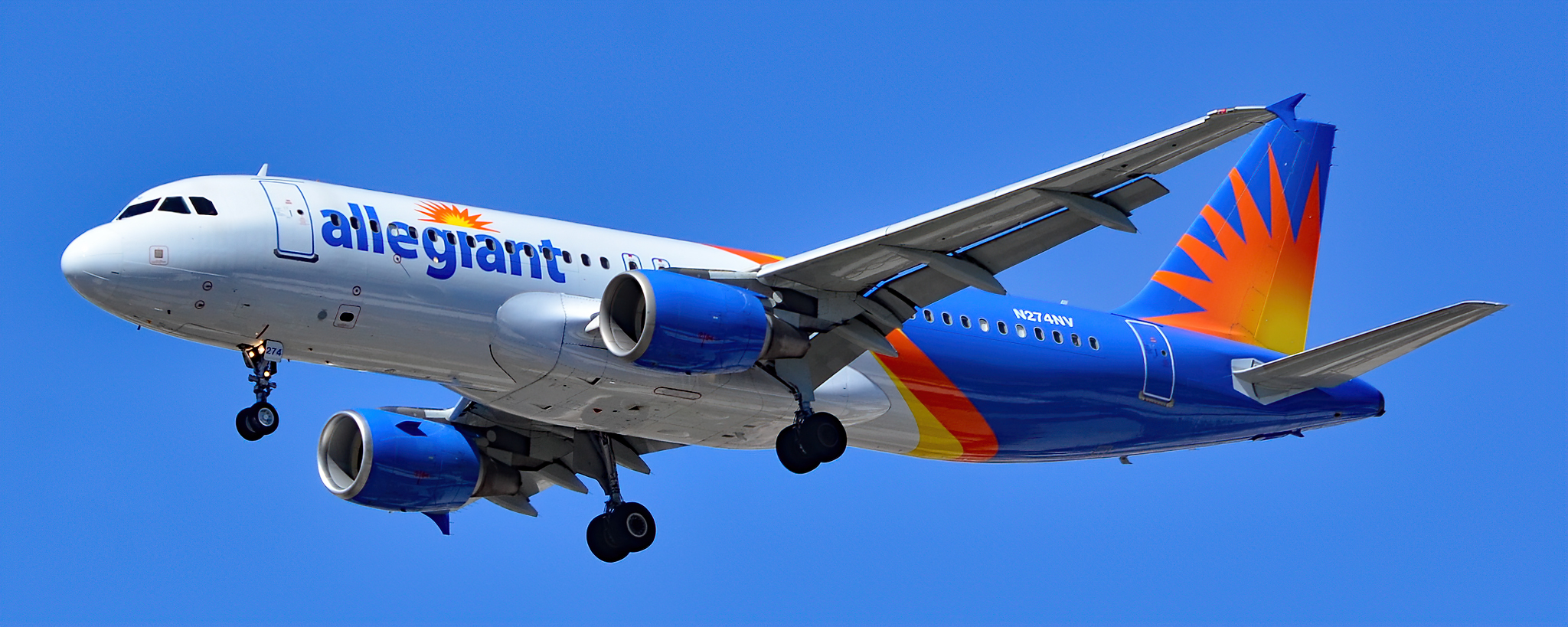
- Allegiant Air Airbus A320
IATA	ICAO	Call sign
G4	AAY	ALLEGIANT
- Founded: January 1997; 29 years ago
- Commenced operations: June 1998; 28 years ago
- AOC #: WX0A156I
- Operating bases: Allentown; Appleton; Asheville; Bellingham (ends November 2026); Cincinnati; Destin/Fort Walton Beach; Des Moines; Flint; Fort Lauderdale; Grand Rapids; Indianapolis; Knoxville; Las Vegas; Nashville; Orlando/Sanford; Phoenix/Mesa; Pittsburgh; Provo; Punta Gorda; Sarasota; Savannah (ends November 2026); St. Petersburg/Clearwater
- Frequent-flyer program: Allways Rewards
- Fleet size: 123
- Destinations: 124
- Parent company: Allegiant Travel Company
- Headquarters: 1201 North Town Center Drive; Las Vegas, Nevada, United States
- Key people: Gregory C. Anderson (CEO)
- Website: allegiantair.com

Allegiant Air is an American ultra-low-cost airline headquartered in Las Vegas, Nevada, United States. The airline focuses on serving leisure traffic from small and medium-sized cities that it considers to be underserved, offering low base fares with minimal inclusions and a greater number of add-on fees.

Allegiant was founded in 1997 and is wholly owned by Allegiant Travel Company, a publicly traded company with 5,600 employees and over US$2.6 billion in market capitalization as of 2016. The airline is the fourteenth largest in North America.

Allegiant Travel Company acquired Sun Country Airlines on May 13, 2026, in a roughly $1.5 billion deal and plans to fold all operations under the Allegiant Air brand while maintaining a significant presence at Sun Country's base at Minneapolis–St. Paul. The two carriers will continue to operate independently until a single operating certificate is granted.

== History ==
=== 1997–1999: Early history ===
Allegiant Air was founded in January 1997 by Mitch Allee, the company's owner and chief executive officer; Jim Patterson, president; and Capt. Dave Beadle, chief pilot, under the name WestJet Express. Following a trademark dispute with Westjet Air Center of Rapid City, South Dakota, and because of the name's similarity to WestJet of Canada, the airline adopted the name Allegiant Air. On June 19, 1998, Allegiant received FAA and DOT certification for scheduled and charter domestic operations. The airline also received authority to operate charter service to Canada and Mexico.

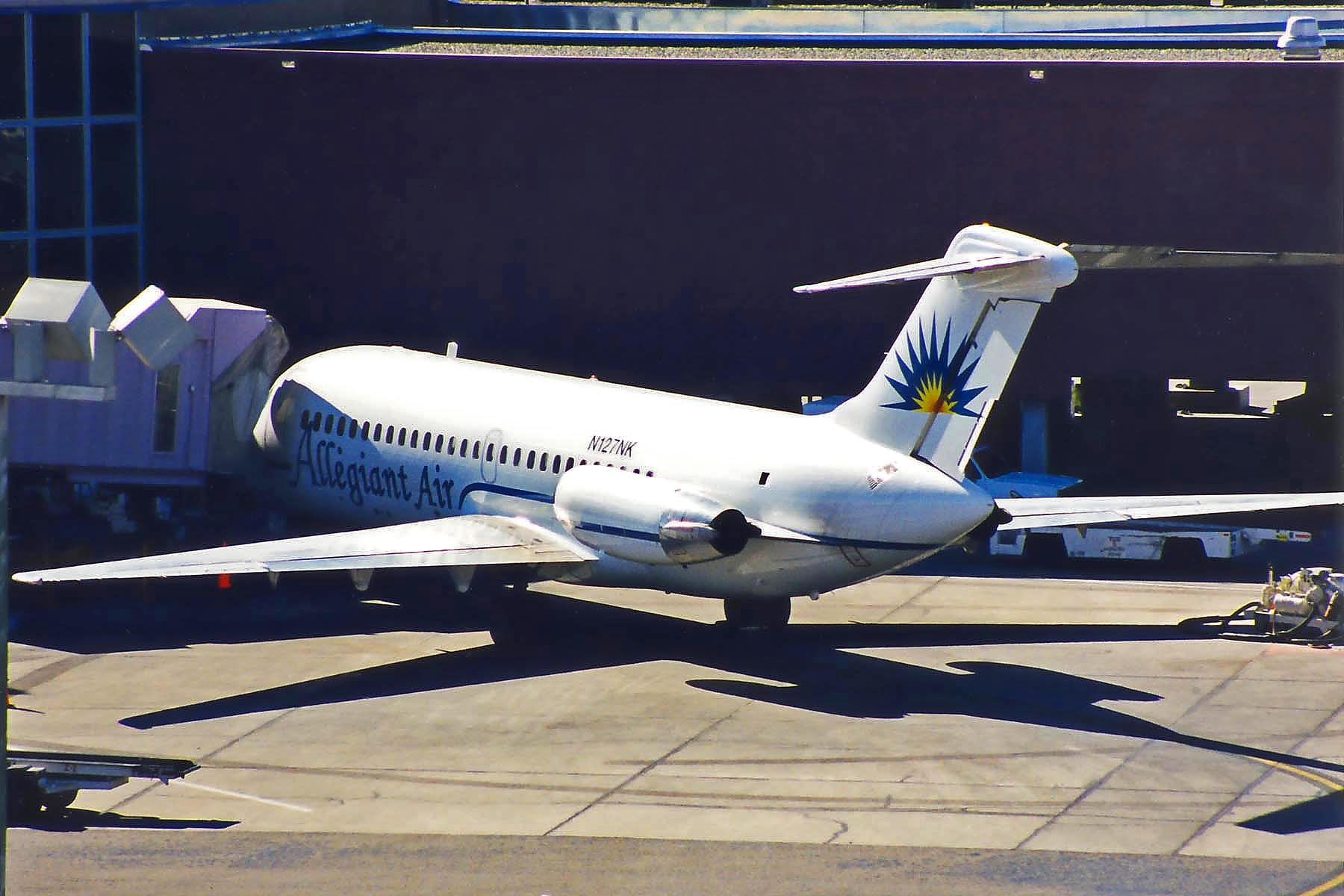
An Allegiant Air Douglas DC-9

Scheduled service began on October 15, 1998, with Douglas DC-9 flights between Las Vegas and the airline's original base in Fresno, California. By August 1999, Allegiant added service to South Lake Tahoe and Burbank. In November, the schedule was cutback to just Las Vegas to Long Beach or Fresno. During this period, Allegiant operated its flights as direct-sale public charters.

=== 2000s ===
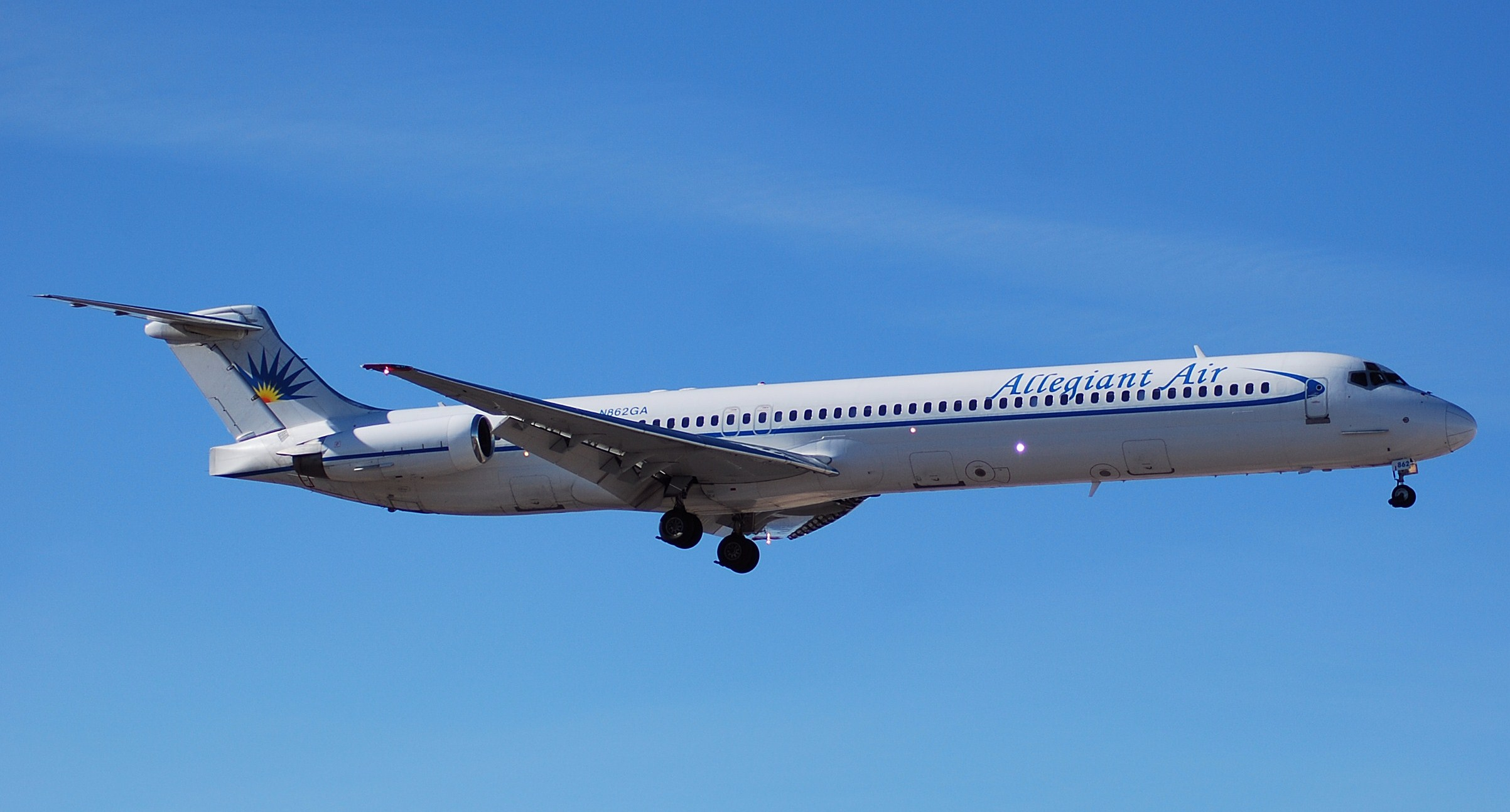
A former Allegiant Air McDonnell Douglas MD-83 wearing the first livery

In 2000, Allegiant dropped the public charter designation, resumed flights from South Lake Tahoe, and added service to Portland, Oregon, and Reno.

Higher fuel costs contributed to Allegiant filing for Chapter 11 bankruptcy protection in December 2000. The restructuring allowed major creditor Maury Gallagher to take control of the airline. Gallagher had previously worked with Fresno-based WestAir and was among the founders of ValuJet Airlines. Under his leadership, Allegiant adopted a low-cost carrier business model focused on linking smaller cities with Las Vegas while selling bundled air and hotel packages. The airline exited bankruptcy in late 2001, and the case was formally closed in early 2002. During the restructuring, Allegiant relocated its headquarters and operations to Las Vegas.

Allegiant entered into a long-term agreement with Harrah's in March 2002 to provide charter flights to its casinos in Laughlin and Reno. Around the same time, the airline acquired its first McDonnell Douglas MD-80 aircraft. Between 2002 and 2004, Allegiant developed its scheduled-service model around leisure travel from smaller cities to Las Vegas. By 2004, the airline served Las Vegas from 13 small cities and sold bundled vacation packages that combined airfare and hotel accommodations.

Allegiant Travel, the airline's holding company, completed a private equity placement worth $39.5 million in May 2005. The company later filed a registration statement with the Securities and Exchange Commission ahead of a planned initial public offering of common stock. Allegiant raised $94.5 million through the sale of 5.75 million shares priced at $18 each. Shares began trading on the NASDAQ under the ticker symbol "ALGT" in December 2006.

By 2006, Allegiant operated a fleet of 21 MD-80 aircraft and served 40 small cities, primarily through Las Vegas and Orlando/Sanford, Florida. The airline opened a fourth operations base at Mesa, Arizona, in October 2007, linking the Phoenix metropolitan area with 14 Allegiant destinations. Mesa joined Las Vegas, Orlando, and Tampa/St. Petersburg as operating bases for the airline. At the time, Allegiant operated 32 aircraft serving 53 destinations. Mesa Gateway Airport later announced a 10,000-square-foot (930 m^{2}) terminal expansion that increased the number of gates from two to four and allowed Allegiant to expand service in the Phoenix area.

Allegiant opened its fifth operations base at Fort Lauderdale on November 14, 2007, adding connections between South Florida and other Allegiant destinations. A sixth base opened at Bellingham, Washington, in January 2008. Growth at Bellingham was partly driven by the airport's proximity to Greater Vancouver in British Columbia.

=== 2010s ===
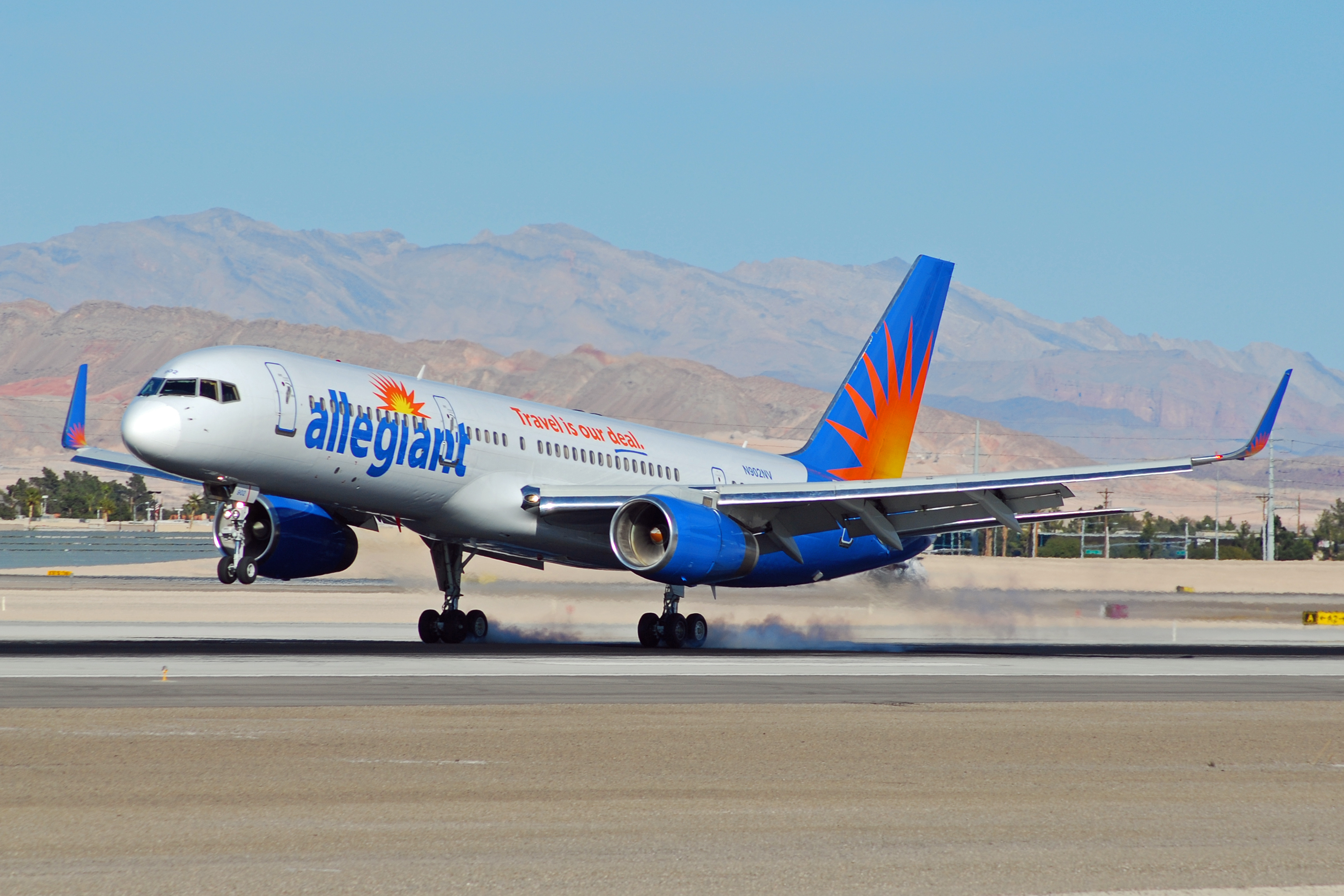
A former Allegiant Air Boeing 757-200 in 2012

In January 2010, the airline celebrated its one-millionth passenger to fly out of Phoenix-Mesa Gateway Airport. Allegiant's parent company also announced that it had purchased 18 additional used MD-80 aircraft from Scandinavian Airlines. In February 2010, Allegiant opened its ninth base at Grand Rapids' Gerald R. Ford International Airport in Michigan. The airline based two McDonnell Douglas MD-80 aircraft in Grand Rapids, but ended their airport's status in 2011. The airline continues to fly out of Grand Rapids in a reduced capacity.

On July 1, 2010, Allegiant returned to Long Beach Airport (LGB) in Long Beach, California, having previously served LGB with DC-9 jets with nonstop flights to Las Vegas (LAS) and Lake Tahoe (TVL) in 2000. The airline also intended to fly from Bellingham and Stockton several times a week; however, that plan never came to fruition. Allegiant continues to serve Stockton with flights to Las Vegas, Phoenix/Mesa and San Diego. About 16 months later in November 2011, Allegiant closed its Long Beach facility.

In March 2010, Allegiant purchased six used Boeing 757-200 jetliners as part of plans to begin flights to Hawaii, with deliveries from early 2010 to the fourth quarter of 2011. It gained approval for the type with the FAA in July 2011, and then worked with the FAA to obtain the appropriate ETOPS rating in order to be able to serve Hawaii. Allegiant no longer operates service to Hawaii.

In July 2015, Allegiant Air announced that bases would be established at the Asheville Regional Airport and Cincinnati/Northern Kentucky International Airport. In October the same year, it came under Federal Aviation Administration monitoring following several emergency landings and aborted takeoffs involving its McDonnell Douglas MD-80 fleet. In December, WFTS-TV interviewed a former Allegiant mechanic who alleged that maintenance procedures were not consistently followed before aircraft were returned to service. A 2016 investigation by the Tampa Bay Times reported that Allegiant aircraft were four times more likely to experience in-flight failures than aircraft operated by other major U.S. airlines. The newspaper also found that 46 of the airline's 86 aircraft had made emergency landings. At the time, the average age of Allegiant's MD-80 fleet was 29 years. There were also more than 100 serious mechanical incidents between January 2016 and October 2017, including engine failures, cabin smoke incidents, hydraulic leaks, and aborted takeoffs. Allegiant responded that many of the incidents involved its MD-80 fleet, which it was replacing with Airbus A320 family aircraft. The airline also cited the 2016 FAA audit, which found the carrier's safety issues to be "minor" and "non-systemic". Allegiant later stated that it received a "clean bill of health" following a 2016 FAA audit. FAA officials said the airline had returned to the agency's normal five-year inspection cycle.

In August 2017, Allegiant announced that a new base would be established at the Indianapolis International Airport. The base began operations in early 2018. Throughout 2017, the airline flew 12 million passengers on its 99 planes to 120 destinations from California to Florida. In February 2018, Allegiant also announced that a new base would be established at the Destin–Fort Walton Beach Airport. In June 2018, Allegiant added another base at McGhee Tyson Airport in Knoxville, Tennessee. Allegiant retired all of its MD-80 aircraft by November 2018.

In January 2019, Allegiant announced that it would be adding another base at Gerald R. Ford International Airport in Grand Rapids, Michigan. Allegiant announced that they would be adding an additional base at Des Moines International Airport in Des Moines, Iowa, by November 2019. The base was delayed as a result of the COVID-19 pandemic and opened in 2021.

=== 2020s ===
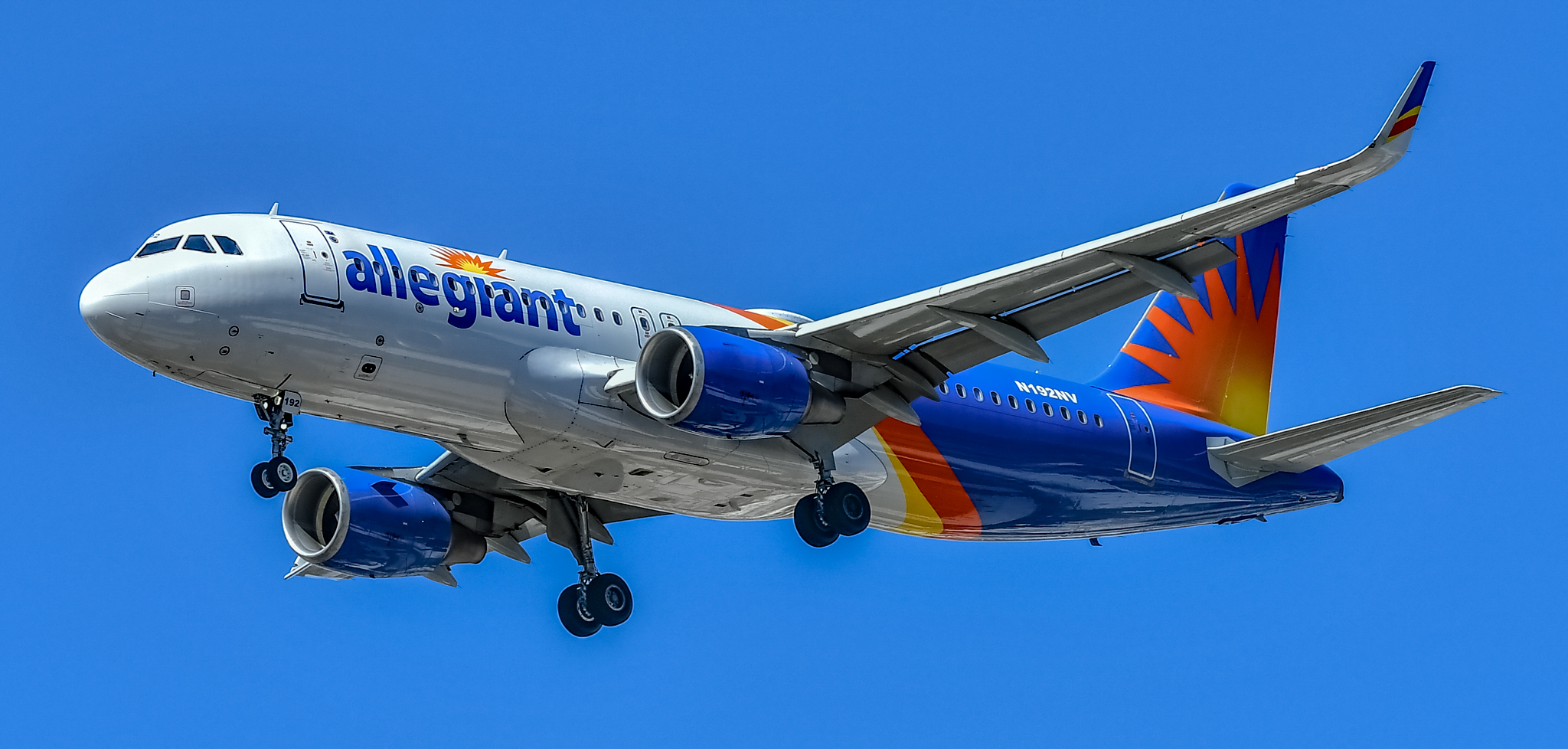
Allegiant Air Airbus A320 in 2025

On February 12, 2021, Allegiant launched flights to John Wayne Airport in Orange County, California with eight initial destinations including Boise, Grand Junction, Las Vegas, Medford, Missoula, Provo, Reno/Tahoe, and Spokane.

On August 10, 2021, Allegiant announced that they would be opening two more operating bases at Appleton and Bishop beginning March 2022.

On October 7, 2021, Allegiant began serving non-stop flights from Minneapolis-St. Paul to Asheville, North Carolina, and Palm Beach, Florida. They would later serve five more, including Punta Gorda, Florida; Destin-Fort Walton Beach, Florida; and Phoenix-Mesa, Arizona. They serve all of these routes using Airbus A320 family aircraft. During the same year, it entered into a joint venture with Viva Aerobus to expand routes between the United States and Mexico.

In January 2026, Allegiant Travel Company announced an agreement to acquire Sun Country Airlines in a cash-and-stock transaction valued at about $1.5 billion. The agreement was approved by the boards of both companies and expected to close in the second half of 2026, subject to approval by Sun Country shareholders and regulatory review by the United States Department of Justice and other authorities. The airlines will continue to operate separately until receiving a single Federal Aviation Administration operating certificate. Following the completion of the merger, the combined airline was expected to operate under the Allegiant name and be headquartered in Las Vegas, with Allegiant chief executive officer Gregory C. Anderson continuing to lead the company and Sun Country chief executive officer Jude Bricker joining the board of directors.

== Corporate affairs ==
Allegiant Air is a wholly owned subsidiary of Allegiant Travel Company, a publicly traded holding company. The corporate headquarters for both the airline and its holding company are in Summerlin, Nevada, a suburb of Las Vegas.

=== Business model ===
Allegiant's business model differs from most other U.S. ultra-low-cost carriers by focusing primarily on leisure travelers in small and medium-sized cities that it considers underserved by major airlines. The airline operates nonstop flights from these markets to warm-weather vacation destinations such as Florida, Las Vegas, and Phoenix, avoiding the traditional hub-and-spoke model used by larger carriers. Because many of its routes face little or no direct competition, Allegiant has been able to maintain a niche network; as of early 2020, only 18% of its 518 routes were also served nonstop by another airline.

Like other ULCCs, Allegiant offers low base fares with few included amenities while generating substantial ancillary revenue through additional fees for services such as checked and carry-on baggage, seat assignments, and onboard food and beverages. The airline also aggressively markets hotel bookings, rental cars, and tourist attractions through its Allegiant Vacations platform, generating additional commission revenue beyond airfare sales. In 2024, ancillary fees averaged $75.34 per passenger.

Operationally, Allegiant emphasizes simplicity and low overhead costs. The airline sells only point-to-point nonstop itineraries and does not offer connecting service, reducing scheduling complexity and minimizing the need to re-accommodate passengers during disruptions. It frequently serves secondary airports in major metropolitan areas where landing fees and operating costs are lower, and in some markets has rented ticket counters on an hourly basis while outsourcing ground handling and airport staffing to third-party contractors. Allegiant maintains numerous crew bases and typically schedules employees to return to their home base each day, reducing hotel and overnight expenses. Allegiant has also historically pursued a lower-cost fleet strategy by purchasing used or discounted aircraft and operating them at lower daily utilization rates than many competitors.

=== Charter flights ===
Allegiant's air charter operation contributed 7% of its revenue in 2009.

In March 2011, Allegiant took over charter service to Wendover Airport for Peppermill Casinos, Inc. to shuttle customers to Peppermill's three casinos in West Wendover, Nevada.

Allegiant also transports firefighters for the United States Forest Service as well as college basketball teams. Allegiant had a contract to supply charter flights from Miami to four cities in Cuba beginning June 2009. The contract was for fixed-fee flying, meaning all the airline was required to do was provide the dry aircraft and the flight crew. The contractor was responsible for all other costs including fuel. Allegiant ended this service in August 2009.

The company had charter contracts with Caesars Entertainment to ferry customers to Caesars casino properties through Reno-Tahoe International Airport, Laughlin/Bullhead International Airport and Tunica Municipal Airport. These contracts ended in December 2012 when Caesars Entertainment signed a new contract with Republic Airways to provide the charter service to Caesars properties in Atlantic City, New Jersey, Tunica, Mississippi, and Laughlin, Nevada.

=== Sponsorships ===
In July 2018, Allegiant became the official airline of Minor League Baseball (MiLB). In September of the same year, Allegiant partnered with the National Hockey League's Vegas Golden Knights as its official airline partner. On June 3, 2019, soccer club FC Cincinnati announced that they had entered a multiple-year agreement with Allegiant making them the club's official airline partner. The agreement includes club and stadium assets, game-day experience and more. Allegiant also offers its popular Fan Flyaway Program to FCC fans. FCC's TQL Stadium also has an entry gate named after the airline.

On August 5, 2019, Allegiant signed a 20-year agreement with the NFL's Las Vegas Raiders for the naming rights to their new stadium, Allegiant Stadium, in Paradise, Nevada. Allegiant was also a main sponsor with GMS Racing in the NASCAR Xfinity Series and the NASCAR Gander Outdoors Truck Series and continues to be an associate sponsor for the team co-owned by Chairman Maury Gallagher, Legacy Motor Club in the NASCAR Cup Series. In January 2020, Allegiant became the official airline of the Indianapolis Colts.

=== Workers' right to organize ===
Flight attendants at the carrier voted to organize under the Transport Workers Union of America in December 2010, citing scheduling concerns and other issues in their work rules. In August 2012, the pilots voted to organize and joined the Teamsters. Allegiant's chairman and then-CEO, Maurice J. Gallagher Jr., was critical of the unionization of airline employees, saying, "Unionization is one of those things that clogs the arteries and makes you less quick and not as nimble as you need to be on top of your game... In this industry and others that are heavily unionized, you ultimately end up with bankruptcy as the primary driver."

== Destinations ==
As of December 2021, Allegiant served 133 destinations across the United States, primarily focusing on smaller non-hub regional airports with flights often operating only a few times per week. The airline adjusts routes based on expected demand and profitability, regularly adding or discontinuing service as market conditions change.

Allegiant Air frequently serves secondary airports in major metropolitan areas where landing fees and operating costs are lower than at the region's primary airport. Examples include serving Mesa instead of Sky Harbor in the Phoenix area; Midway instead of O'Hare in Chicago; Orlando/Sanford instead of Orlando International; St. Pete–Clearwater instead of Tampa International; and MidAmerica instead of Lambert in the St. Louis region.

Although it does not operate flights within Canada, Allegiant markets to Canadian travelers and intentionally serves airports near the Canada–United States border, such as Bellingham, Washington, which attracts passengers from the Vancouver area, and Plattsburgh, New York, which serves travelers from the Montreal region.

=== Top domestic markets ===
Top domestic markets (September 2024 - August 2025)
Rank	Airport	Passengers	Share
1	Orlando/Sanford, Florida	1,486,280	100%
2	St. Petersburg/Clearwater, Florida	1,304,950	99.5%
3	Punta Gorda/Fort Myers, Florida	1,090,820	99.5%
4	Phoenix/Mesa, Arizona	1,041,150	98%
5	Las Vegas, Nevada	972,850	4%

== Fleet ==
=== Current fleet ===
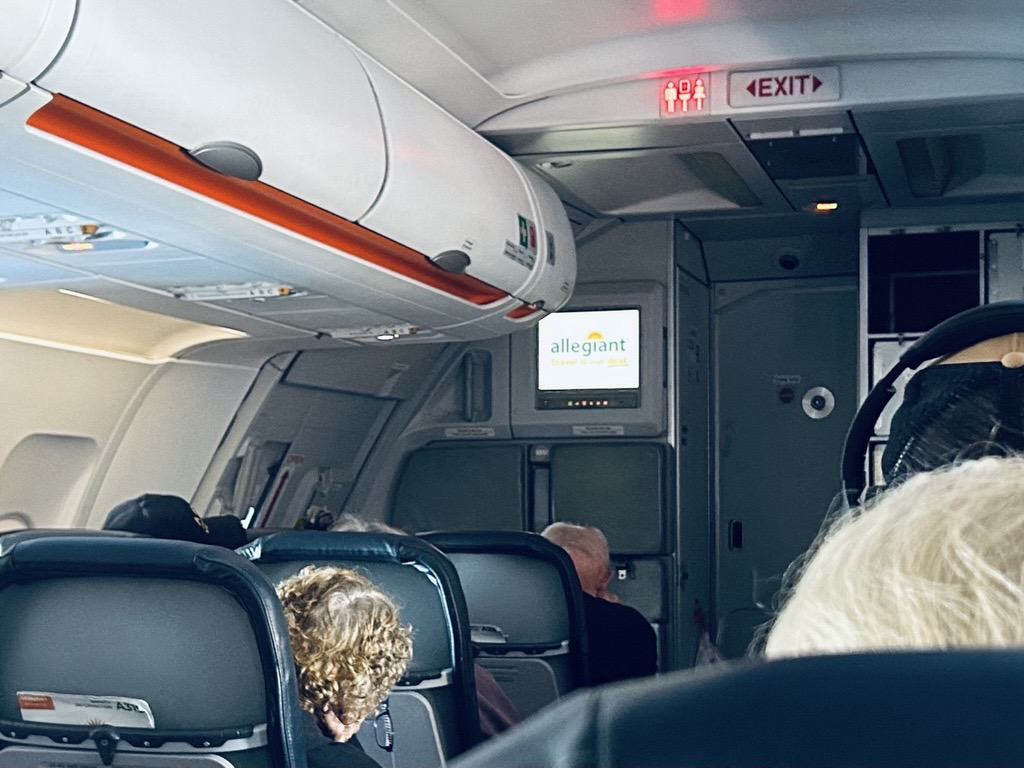
Interior of an Allegiant Air aircraft.

As of January 2026, the Allegiant fleet consists of the following aircraft:

Aircraft	In service	Orders	Passengers				Notes
Aircraft	In service	Orders	E	Y+	Y	Total	Notes
Airbus A319-100	28	—	—	18	138	156	
Airbus A320-200	4	—	—	18	159	177	To be retired.
Airbus A320-200	75	—	—	18	168	186	Being reconfigured with Extra class seats.
Airbus A320-200	75	—	36	12	132	180	Being reconfigured with Extra class seats.
Boeing 737 MAX 7	—	24	TBA				Option for 80 additional aircraft. Deliveries until 2027.
Boeing 737 MAX 200	16	10	21	31	138	190	Option for 80 additional aircraft. Deliveries until 2027.
Total	123	34					

=== Fleet development ===
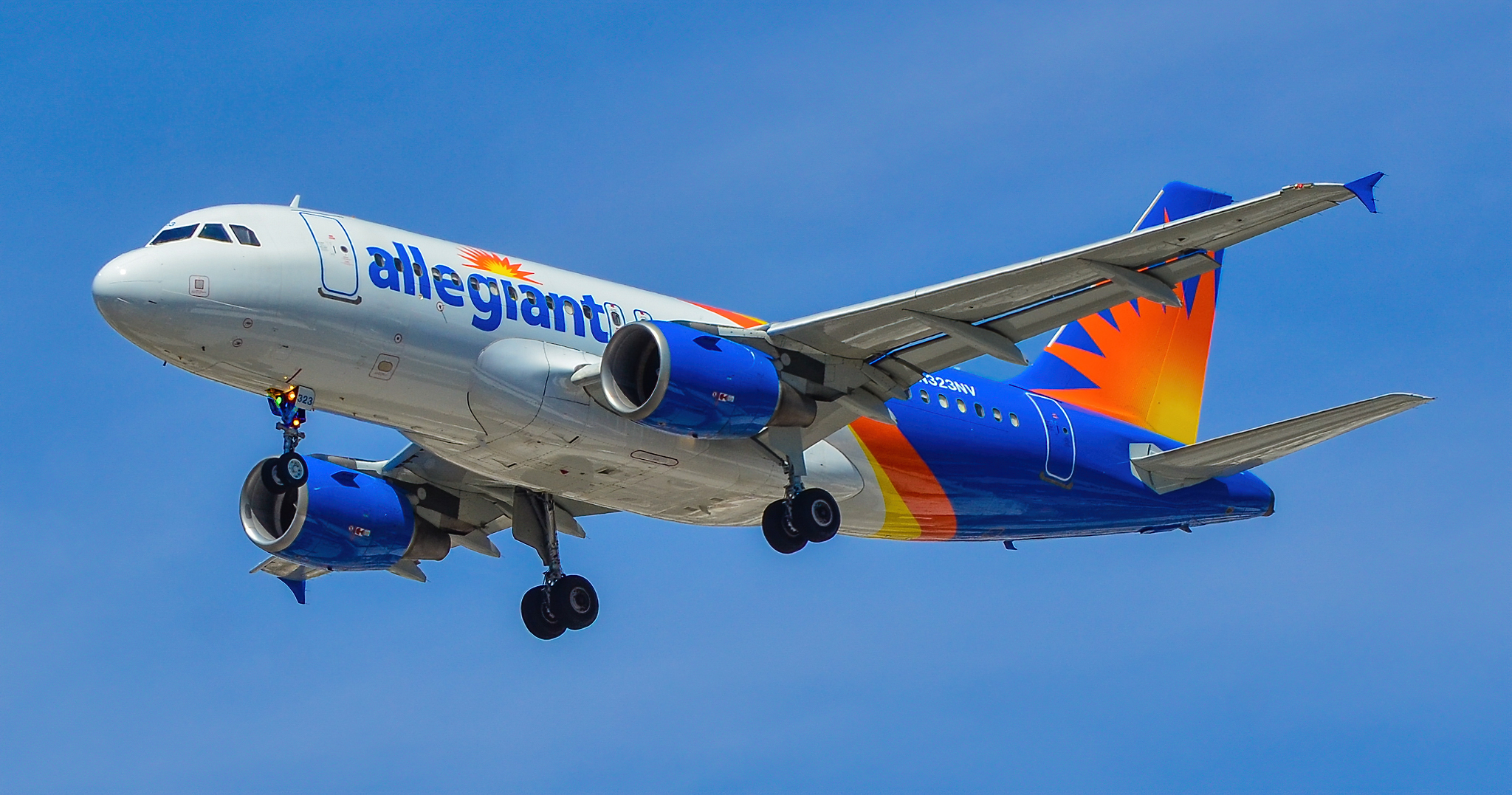
Allegiant Air Airbus A319

Allegiant has historically pursued a lower-cost fleet strategy by purchasing used or discounted aircraft and operating them at lower daily utilization rates than many competitors. The company has stated that low acquisition costs allow it to operate aircraft profitably at lower utilization rates than many other airlines. Allegiant aircraft average between 4 1/2 and 8 flight hours per day, compared with the 11 hours per day targeted by Frontier, another U.S. ULCC, and 13 hours at carriers such as JetBlue.

At the start of operations in the late 1990s, Allegiant operated used McDonnell Douglas DC-9 aircraft. In 2002, the airline began replacing the DC-9 fleet with newer used aircraft from the McDonnell Douglas MD-80 family (MD-82, -83, -87, and -88), a later derivative of the DC-9.

Starting in 2010, Allegiant purchased six Boeing 757-200 aircraft from Thomson Airways. The airline used the aircraft to launch service between the mainland United States and Hawaii. The Hawaii service was ultimately discontinued, and the airline gradually retired the 757 fleet by the end of 2017 rather than undertake expensive D checks on the aircraft.

In 2012, Allegiant announced a transition from the MD-80 fleet to the Airbus A320 family. The airline purchased 35 used Airbus A319 aircraft from EasyJet and Cebu Pacific, configured with high-density seating and four overwing exits. Beginning in 2013, the airline also added used Airbus A320 aircraft acquired from airlines including Iberia and Philippine Airlines, while leasing additional aircraft.

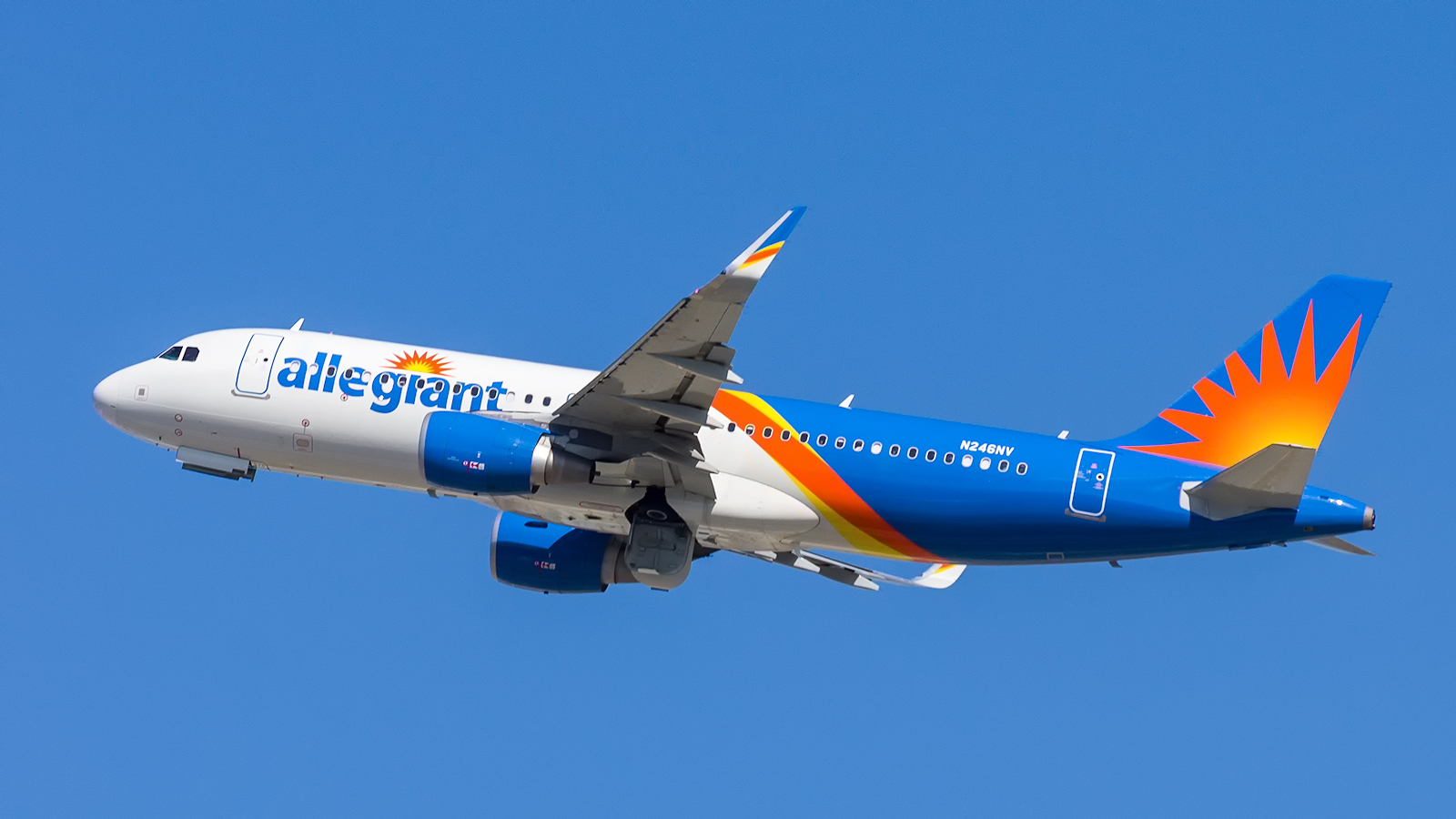
Allegiant Air Airbus A320

In 2016, Allegiant purchased its first brand-new aircraft, ordering 13 Airbus A320s directly from Airbus. The airline stated that it took advantage of lower prices as Airbus prepared to transition production to the newer A320neo family. After exercising additional purchase options, Allegiant ultimately acquired 29 new Airbus aircraft.

The airline retired its last MD-80 in November 2018.

In January 2022, Allegiant announced an order for 50 Boeing 737 MAX aircraft. The airline plans to retire its oldest Airbus aircraft, but will continue to operate the A320-family aircraft alongside the 737 MAX fleet.

== Incidents and accidents ==
- On March 29, 2007, Allegiant Air Flight 758, a McDonnell Douglas MD-83, experienced a hydraulic failure that prevented the nose landing gear from deploying on final approach to Orlando Sanford International Airport. The aircraft landed safely with one passenger among the 157 passengers and crew members receiving minor injuries. The aircraft was substantially damaged but was repaired and returned to service.
- On July 23, 2015, an Allegiant aircraft attempted to land at Hector International Airport in Fargo, North Dakota, which was under a temporary flight restriction due to a rehearsal by the Blue Angels flight team for an upcoming air show. The pilots flying the aircraft, the airline's vice president of flight operations and its director of flight safety, declared a fuel emergency, stating, "Yeah, listen, we're bingo [near empty] fuel here in about probably three to four minutes and I got to come in and land." The FAA issued a letter of correction, to which an Allegiant spokesperson responded that the airline had implemented new training and procedures.

== See also ==
- Air transportation in the United States
