= Grand Forks Municipal Airport =

Airport in Grand Forks County, North Dakota

Coordinates: 47°55′44″N 97°06′02″W

Grand Forks Municipal Airport is a former airport, located within current city limits approximately 3 miles (4.8 km) west-northwest of central Grand Forks, North Dakota. It was closed shortly after World War II and is now redeveloped as part of the urban area of Grand Forks.

== History ==
Airport provided contract glider training to the United States Army Air Forces, 1942–1944. Training provided by Jolly Flying Service. Used primarily C-47 Skytrains and Waco CG-4 unpowered Gliders. The mission of the school was to train glider pilot students in proficiency in operation of gliders in various types of towed and soaring flight, both day and night, and in servicing of gliders in the field.

Airfield closed after the war and aviation operations moved to the current Grand Forks International Airport location. Currently only the original terminal building survives and is used by a travel agency. There are no other remains visible as land was used for expansion of the city of Grand Forks.

== See also ==
- North Dakota World War II Army Airfields
- 29th Flying Training Wing (World War II)
