= Bismarck Municipal Airport =

Airport in North Dakota, United States

- Bismarck Municipal Airport
- IATA: BIS; ICAO: KBIS; FAA LID: BIS

Summary
- Airport type: Public
- Owner: City of Bismarck
- Serves: Bismarck, North Dakota
- Elevation AMSL: 1,661 ft (506 m)
- Coordinates: 46°46′22″N 100°44′45″W
- Website: BismarckAirport.com

Map
- Location in North Dakota BIS (the United States)

Runways
Direction	Length		Surface
Direction	ft	m	Surface
13/31	8,794	2,680	Asphalt
3/21	6,600	2,012	Asphalt

Statistics (2024)
- Aircraft operations: 27,791
- Based aircraft: 93
- Passengers: 586,000
- Sources: Bureau of Transportation Statistics, FAA

Bismarck Municipal Airport (IATA: BIS, ICAO: KBIS, FAA LID: BIS) is in Burleigh County, North Dakota, United States, three miles southeast of the City of Bismarck, North Dakota, which owns it. The National Plan of Integrated Airport Systems for 2011–2015 categorized it as a primary commercial service airport.

== History ==
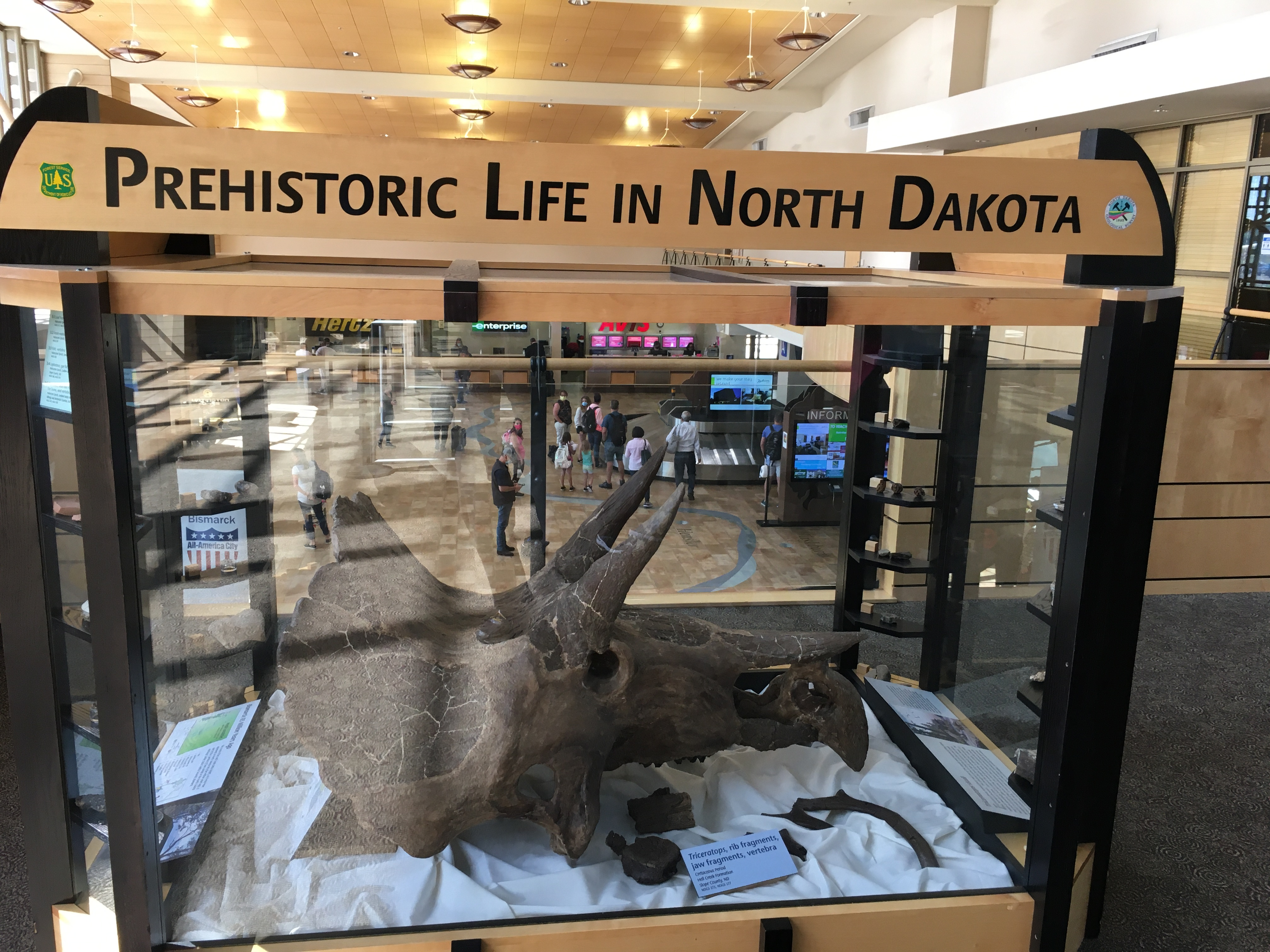
An exhibit on prehistoric life in North Dakota in the upper level of the terminal building, as seen in 2021; behind it on the lower level can be seen a baggage claim carousel and rental car company counters

The original terminal, a single-story Modernist building, was designed in 1963 by Ritterbush Brothers, a local architectural firm. A two-story addition was constructed in 1982. The original building was demolished in 2003 to make way for the present building, and the addition was demolished in summer of 2005, after the completion of the new $15 million terminal. It was designed by Tvenge Associates, another Bismarck firm, and opened in May 2005. A parking lot is just south of the new terminal.

Bismarck Airport had its 7th consecutive year of record passenger boardings in 2016, with 271,020 passengers boarding commercial airline flights at the airport. Airport Director Greg Haug "...was pleased to see the year-end numbers come in and attributes these record boardings to Bismarck’s strong economy."

== Facilities ==
Bismarck Municipal Airport covers 2,425 acres (981 ha) at an elevation of 1,661 feet (506 m). It has two runways, both asphalt: 13/31 is 8,794 by 150 feet (2,680 x 46 m) and 3/21 is 6,600 by 100 feet (2,012 x 30 m).

In the year ending December 31, 2020, the airport had 28,004 aircraft operations, average 77 per day. 93 aircraft were then based at the airport: 49 single-engine aircraft, 16 multi-engine aircraft, 15 military aircraft, 11 jet aircraft, and 2 helicopters.

== Airlines and destinations ==
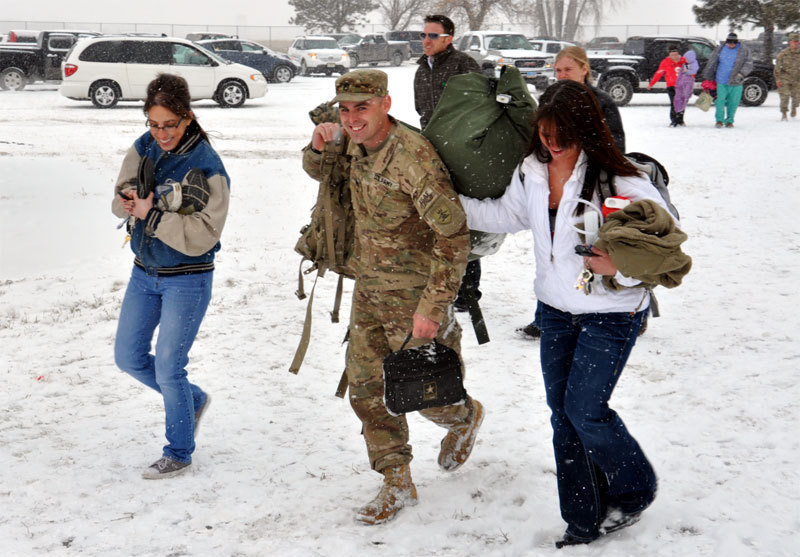
Scene at the parking lot at the airport, 2013

=== Passenger ===
Airlines	Destinations	Refs
Allegiant Air	Las Vegas, Phoenix/Mesa	
American Eagle	Chicago–O'Hare, Dallas/Fort Worth	
Delta Air Lines	Minneapolis/St. Paul	
Delta Connection	Minneapolis/St. Paul	
United Express	Denver	

Destinations map
Destinations from Bismarck Municipal Airport
Red = Year-round destination
Green = Seasonal destination
Blue = Future destination

=== Cargo ===
Airlines	Destinations
Alpine Air Express	Fargo
Encore Air Cargo	Fargo, Sioux Falls
FedEx Feeder	Fargo

== Statistics ==
=== Top destinations from BIS ===
Busiest domestic routes from BIS (August 2025 – July 2026)
Rank	Airport	Passengers	Airline
1	(Minnesota) Minneapolis–Saint Paul International (MSP)	121,490	Delta
2	(Colorado) Denver International (DEN)	65,710	United
3	(Texas) Dallas/Fort Worth (DFW)	45,940	American
4	(Arizona) Phoenix–Mesa Gateway (AZA)	36,150	Allegiant
5	(Nevada) Las Vegas McCarran (LAS)	15,430	Allegiant
6	(Illinois) Chicago–O'Hare (ORD)	15,100	American
7	(Florida) Orlando–Sanford (SFB)	2,130	Allegiant

=== Carrier shares ===
Carrier shares (August 2025 – July 2026)
Rank	Carrier	Passengers	% of market
1	SkyWest	216,000	35.77%
2	Envoy	120,000	19.92%
3	Allegiant	107,000	17.82%
4	Endeavor	84,130	13.96%
5	Delta	75,460	12.53%

=== Annual traffic ===
Traffic by calendar year
	Passengers	Change from previous year
2014	492,000	-
2015	523,000	▲6.30%
2016	544,000	▲4.02%
2017	545,000	▲0.18%
2018	563,000	▲3.30%
2019	618,000	▲9.77%
2020	303,000	▼50.97%
2021	427,000	▲40.92%
2022	481,000	▲12.64%
2023	513,000	▲6.65%
2024	586,000	▲14.23%
2025	616,000	▲5.12%

=== Accidents at or near BIS ===
On April 7, 1998, a Corporate Air Cessna 208B Super Cargomaster impacted terrain 1.6 miles SE of Bismarck Municipal Airport due to the pilot's failure to maintain airspeed during the approach, icing conditions and low level experience with the aircraft type. The sole occupant, the pilot, was killed.

== Ground transportation ==
Bis-Man Transit buses provide service directly to the terminal. The 3 Green Route travels from downtown Bismarck to the airport and the University of Mary.

== See also ==
- List of airports in North Dakota
- North Dakota World War II Army Airfields
