= Maury Gallagher =

American entrepreneur

Maurice J. Gallagher Jr.
- Occupations: Chairman, Allegiant Travel Company; Founder and owner of GMS Racing; Co-owner of Legacy Motor Club
- Known for: Commercial airline entrepreneur and NASCAR team owner
- Spouse: Marcia Gallagher
- Children: 2, including Spencer

Maurice J. Gallagher Jr., (born November 26, 1950) also known as Maury Gallagher, is a commercial airline entrepreneur and current chairman and former CEO of Allegiant Travel Company. Prior to Allegiant, he co-founded and invested in WestAir and ValuJet. He is also the founder of several non-aviation businesses in the telecommunications and adaptive learning fields. He is also the co-owner of the NASCAR Cup Series racing team Legacy Motor Club.

Gallagher is an alumnus of UC Davis where he endowed a chair in the name of him and his wife. The university also has a named hall for Gallagher, referred to as the Maurice J. Gallagher Jr. Hall.

== Early life and education ==
Gallagher attended UC Davis where he received his Bachelor of Arts in history in 1971. He went on to UC Berkeley where he received his MBA in 1974.

== Career ==
=== Aviation career ===
Gallagher was a founder of WestAir, which operated from 1978 to 1992. He served as Vice President-Finance of the parent company of WestAirCommuter Holdings, Inc. from 1979 until 1982. From 1983 until August 1992, he served as an executive and director of WestAir Holding, Inc. until the company was acquired by Mesa Air in May 1992. WestAir functioned as the west-coast commuter/regional airline affiliate of United Airlines. Gallagher also was a member of the investment group that founded ValuJet Airlines, Inc. (one of the predecessors to AirTran Airways, Inc.) and served as a board member of ValuJet from its inception in 1993 until 1997.

Gallagher is the Chairman of Allegiant Travel Company, and its major subsidiary, Allegiant Air. Gallagher was the major creditor of the then small, Fresno-based scheduled airline in 2000 when it declared bankruptcy. He gained control of the airline as a result of the bankruptcy and later became CEO and Chairman. The airline changed headquarters to Las Vegas and eventually changed its business model of flying older large commercial aircraft from small cities around the US to large leisure destinations (initially Las Vegas, later Orlando, Phoenix, St Petersburg, Fort Lauderdale and other cities).

In September 2024, Gallagher retired from the CEO position.

=== Telecommunications and adaptive learning ===
Gallagher has been involved other entrepreneurial activities, not all of them aviation-related. For instance, in between his time at ValuJet and Allegiant, he founded and had leadership positions at Mpower Communications, a CLEC that went public in 1998.

=== Motorsports ===
Outside of airlines, he is also known for owning GMS Racing, an American professional NASCAR team that currently fields entries in the NASCAR Camping World Truck Series. Originally built in order to further extend his son Spencer Gallagher's racing career in the ARCA Menards Series, it has since become one of the major teams in the Truck Series and Chevrolet's current flagship Truck team. Drivers Johnny Sauter and Sheldon Creed won the Truck Series championship for GMS in 2016 and 2020, respectively.

After the 2021 NASCAR Cup Series season, Richard Petty Motorsports majority owner and Medallion Financial CEO Andrew Murstein sold his stake of the team to Gallagher and the team was renamed Petty GMS Motorsports. The team name was changed to Legacy Motor Club in 2023 after NASCAR Cup Series and IndyCar Series driver Jimmie Johnson purchased an ownership stake. However, the GMS Racing team did not merge into Petty's team, and GMS continued to field entries in the Truck Series and the ARCA Menards Series in 2022. In January 2023, the team announced it would not be fielding cars in the 2023 ARCA Menards Series Season in order to better focus on their entries in the NASCAR Craftsman Truck Series.

== Philanthropy ==
Gallagher has made two prominent donations to the UC Davis Graduate School of Management. The first was for an endowed chair in the name of him and his wife, the second was a $10 million donation which prompted the school to name its new building the Maurice J. Gallagher Jr. Hall. In 2011, Gallagher gave the commencement address for the UC Davis business school.
