= Braniff (name) =

Braniff is both a given name and surname. Notable people with the name include:

- Braniff Bonaventure (born 1973), American football player
- Alberto Braniff (1884–1966), Mexican airplane pilot
- Kevin Braniff (born 1983), Northern Irish footballer
- Paul Braniff (hurler) (born 1983), Irish hurler
- Paul Revere Braniff (1897–1954), American airline executive
- Thomas Elmer Braniff (1883–1954), American airline executive

== See also ==
- Paul Braniff (disambiguation)
- Braniff (disambiguation)
