= Braniff (disambiguation) =

Braniff may refer to:

- Braniff (name); people with the given name and surname "Braniff"
- Braniff Productions; the old name of the production company for South Park, now called South Park Studios

== Airlines ==
- Braniff International Airways, a pioneering American airline that existed from 1928 until 1982.
- Braniff (1983-1990), Braniff, Inc., the second airline, formed from portions of the assets of Braniff International which operated between 1983 and 1990, to use the same name of its predecessor.
- Braniff (1991-1992), the third airline to bear the Branniff name formed in 1991 that went out of business in 1992

== See also ==
- Paul Braniff (disambiguation)
