= Charles Edmund Beard =

American businessman and CEO

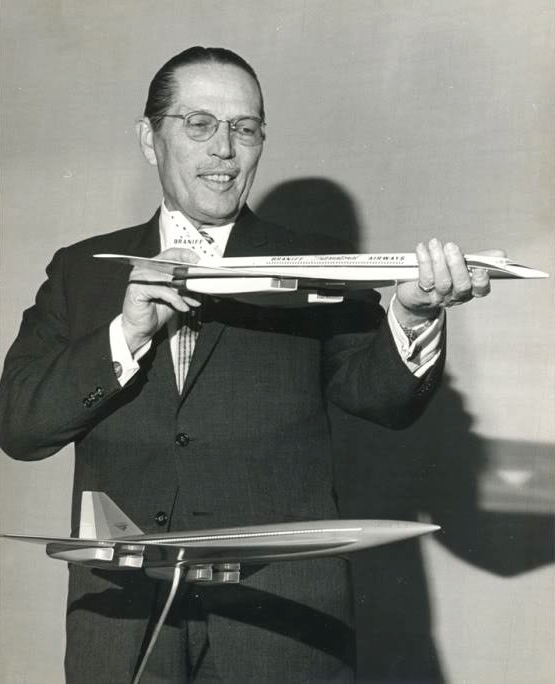
- April 1964 Braniff file photo of President Charles Edmund Beard admiring models of designs for the US Supersonic Transport. In May 1964, he had placed deposits for two of the planned aircraft for Braniff.

President of Braniff Airways
- In office 1954–1965
- Preceded by: Tom Braniff
- Succeeded by: Harding Lawrence

Charles Edmund Beard (November 23, 1900 − July 18, 1982) was the former President of Braniff International Airways, from 1954 until 1965. He was the third president since its inception in 1928, the first person outside the Braniff family to be CEO of the airline. Beard, along with Braniff Board Chairman Fred Jones (Oklahoma City, Oklahoma Ford dealer magnate), managed the airline conservatively, but recorded record growth and traffic statistics between 1954 and early 1965.

== Early years ==
Beard was born September 5, 1906, in Toledo, Ohio. His parents were Hiram Edmund Beard and Mamie Reiser Beard. He attended Lake Forest Academy in Lake Forest, Illinois, where he completed grades nine through twelve.

Beard entered the United States Navy at the age of 16 as a Carpenter's Mate, after convincing them that he was 18 and therefore allowed to enlist. He signed up for aerial gunnery school and graduated third in a class of 400. He was assigned to the Great Lakes Training Station as a Chief Gunner's Mate instructor.

== Education and early careers ==
Beard was honorably discharged from the military and continued his education at the university level. He returned to Lake Forest, Illinois, and attended nearby Lake Forest College to take basic courses. He then transferred to the University of Toledo to prepare for a career in the newspaper business. At Toledo he took courses including history, journalism, and English. He could not graduate from the university, as he left the school in 1922, to begin working to support his family. Charles Beard was offered a job as a reporter with the Chicago Daily News. He accepted and moved to Chicago at the age of 21.

Beard's career in journalism was short-lived, and he became interested in acting. In 1922, he moved to New York City, and began his stage career on what was called the Subway Circuit, a group of legitimate New York theaters not on Broadway that featured shows that had left Broadway and were to be "going on tour" or shows being tried out in the Subway Circuit first to see if they would get a positive review on Broadway.

In 1922, he met Rose Esther Wheaton of Kokomo, Indiana, and married her on February 23, 1923, in Toledo, Ohio, after moving from New York to Toledo where he accepted a position working in a warehouse. The pay was eighteen dollars per week and Beard remained with the warehouse job until 1928, eventually being promoted to sales manager. In 1929, Beard was offered a job in Chicago with the Chicago Air Traffic Association as a ticket manager. He did well there, and was asked to go to New York to open a consolidated ticket office for the Association in 1932.

Beard was then offered a job with Northwest Airways in 1933, as Passenger Traffic Manager. He remained with the carrier for only a short period until an industry-wide economic slowdown caused him to be laid off. Beard then took various jobs at the Chicago World's Fair working for Chevrolet and finally Goodyear Tire and Rubber between 1933 and 1935. His career path would soon change and he would find his career home for the next thirty years at a small Oklahoma-based airline.

== Braniff Airways, Inc. ==
Beard was hired by Braniff Airways, Inc. of Oklahoma City, Oklahoma, in October, 1935. His first position was as General Traffic Manager. Braniff grew from a small local service carrier to the tenth largest carrier in the world in terms or passengers carried, becoming a major international carrier in 1948 with service extended from the mainland US to the southern reaches of South America.

In 1937 Beard would be elevated to Vice President of the Texas airline, and was also elected to the board of directors. His duties were administration of advertising, sales and airline traffic. He was further promoted in 1943 to the executive committee of the board of directors and in 1947 was again promoted to executive vice president. Beard was second in command behind company founder Thomas Elmer Braniff, and was in general running the company by the early 1950s.

On January 11, 1954, company founder Tom Braniff was killed in a private plane crash while on a fishing trip. Beard was elected president of Braniff Airways with Fred Jones, an original Braniff investor, as chairman of the board. Tom Braniff had managed the company with a fatherly and personal touch and that, together with Beard's pragmatic management style, created the perfect team. Beard was now on his own and his overly conservative management methods began to alienate employee groups who had always felt that Braniff was a family, a belief publicized by Tom Braniff. In 1955 Beard wrote a biography of Tom Braniff Thomas E. Braniff (1883-1954) Southwest Pioneer in Air Transportation, published by the Newcomen Society Press, OCLC 4165446.

Beard was, however, a personable manager and was known to arrive at a ticket counter or out in the hangar and extend his hand for a shake followed by "Hello, I'm Chuck Beard, and I work here too." He led the company through the loss of their founder and began planning to take the airline into the fast approaching jet age. He ordered new Lockheed Electra four-engine turboprop aircraft and soon followed with five Boeing 707-227 pure jet aircraft for the longer haul routes of South America and mainland USA transcontinental operations. He also ordered 26 new British Aerospace Corporation BAC-One11 twin jet aircraft for the shorter haul low density operations.

In 1964, Braniff International Airways was purchased by insurance magnate Troy V. Post's Greatamerica Corporation along with National Car Rental. The new owner decided that the airline was in need of a new management team, hiring Harding Lawrence, the executive vice president of Continental Airlines, to be president and Greatamerica's Ed Acker as vice president. This led to Beard's retirement at the age of 64.

In April, 1965, Charles Edmund Beard retired from Braniff after 30 remarkable years of service with the Texas-based carrier. He left on a high note and was at Dallas Love Field on March 11, 1966, for the first delivery of the new BAC-One11 twinjet from England. Beard was largely credited for increasing traffic and profits during each year he was president of Braniff from 1954 until early 1965. However, the phenomenal growth and profits that Braniff would produce after his departure would be the envy of the industry.

== Honors ==
- May, 1957 awarded Order of Merit from Peru
- February, 1960 awarded the Order of Balboa (Panama)
- April, 1964 given Honorary Doctorate of Commercial Science from University of Toledo

== Board memberships ==
- First National Bank of Dallas, Board Member
- Frito Lay Corporation, Dallas, board member and Member of Executive Committee
- Lone Star Cement Company, Dallas, Board Member
- Air Transport Association, Board Member
- Air Traffic Conference, President
- United States Council of the International Chamber of Commerce, Member Air Transport Committee
- Boy Scouts of America, Director of the Dallas Circle 10 Council
- Dallas Theatre Center, Director
- Dallas Council on World Affairs, Director
- The National Association for Mental Health, Director, January, 1960
- Carnegie Foundation for World Peace, Trustee

== Retirement and death ==
After his April, 1965, retirement from his beloved Braniff Airways, Charles Beard remained active in the Dallas business community with his various board memberships and civic activities. On May 12, 1982, the day Braniff International ceased operations, he suffered a major heart attack. He died on July 18, 1982, and was buried with his first wife, Rose E. Beard, who died of cancer in 1963. He had two children with her: a son, Rev. Robert D. Beard, and a daughter Barbara Rose Magee. After her death he married Doris Stewart Beard in 1964.
