= George Stanley Gordon =

American advertising executive (1926–2013)

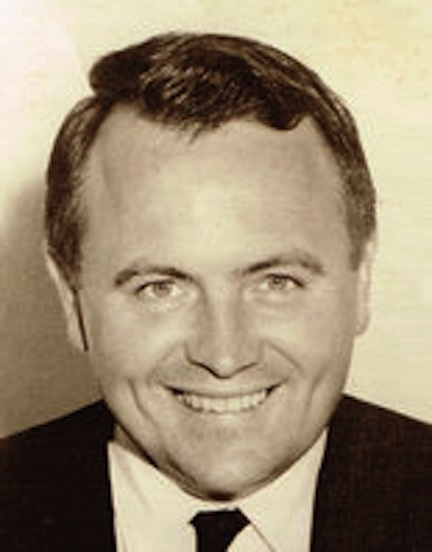
Founder of Gordon and Shortt Advertising Agency, George Stanley Gordon

George Stanley Gordon (November 19, 1926 – April 22, 2013) was an American advertising executive who founded the famed Gordon and Shortt Advertising Agency. Gordon approached famed artist Alexander Calder and brought him to Braniff International Airways Chairman Harding Lawrence with a proposal for Calder to paint a Braniff jet airliner in what would become the world's first flying artwork.

== Early life and education ==
George Gordon was born in Brooklyn, New York. His parents were mother Emily Millar Gordon from County Down, Ireland, and father George Gordon from Liverpool England. George Gordon's mother was a housewife and his father a Merchant Marine who served in World War I for England. George Gordon had a brother and one sister.

Gordon began attending PS 102 in Brooklyn, New York, in 1933, at the age of eight. He then attended high school years at Brooklyn Technical High School where he graduated in January, 1944, with a major in Chemistry. In 1944, Gordon enrolled and attended Brown University in Providence, Rhode Island, where he majored in Psychology. Gordon attended the school via a Naval Scholarship. While at the school he played baseball and won two varsity letters which eventually led him to a try out for the Brooklyn Dodgers. He then played baseball for the Olean, New York team. Gordon graduated from Brown in June, 1946, with a Bachelor of Arts degree.

In May, 1946, Gordon earned a ranking of Ensign in the Navy. He received his military training at Bloomsburg State Teacher's College at Bloomsburg, Pennsylvania, where he was trained as a Gunnery and Deck Officer. Gordon served in World War II, treating the wounded on hospital ships in the Pacific Theater. Gordon remained in the Naval Reserves until 1959.

Gordon attended the University of Pennsylvania's Wharton School of Finance where he graduated in 1949 with a Masters of Business Administration Degree. Gordon attended Harvard University's six-week Advanced Management Program in 1968.

== Early career ==
After his honorable discharge from the military in 1949, Gordon moved to Canada where he became Brand Manager for National Distellers. His research and development plan was credited with developing the first marketing plan in the liquor industry aimed at the African American market. His position continued with National Distillers until 1953. He then accepted a position with Benton and Bowles Advertising Agency where he became Account Manager for his first multimillion-dollar budget for selling Procter & Gamble Products. Gordon remained with Benton and Bowles until 1957.

In 1958, Gordon became director of worldwide marketing at Massey Ferguson. Gordon was lauded for turning the 300 million USD company to a profitable status. When he arrived the company was near bankruptcy and he decided that the company would use national television to promote its products. He remained with Massey Ferguson until 1963.

Gordon accepted a position at Eastern Airlines in 1963, as Vice-President of Marketing. Gordon created The Sunrise at Eastern Campaign and was in charge of a 92 million USD budget. The Sunrise Campaign caused an increase in Eastern's market share and a doubling of yearly carrier's revenue's to 750 million USD. Gordon reported directly to Eastern's President Arthur D. Lewis, the successor to Eddie Rickenbacker and remained with Eastern until 1963.

== Founder Gordon and Shortt Agency ==
In 1963, after leaving Eastern Airlines, Gordon accepted a position with Foote, Cone and Belding. He was named Vice President of Management and Supervisor and remained with them until 1974.

While at Foote Cone, and Belding, George Gordon formed his own advertising agency, Gordon and Shortt in 1968. Gordon and Shortt had such clients as General Motors and Braniff Airways, where he created the Flying Colors Campaign. Gordon merged his agency with Wells Rich Greene Agency of New York which became Wells Rich Greene and Shortt in the Dallas, Texas market. George Gordon retired in 1980 but the new agency continued to service the Braniff account until 1981. The Gordon and Shortt Agency had offices in Dallas, Detroit and New York City.

== Alexander Calder Flying Mobiles ==
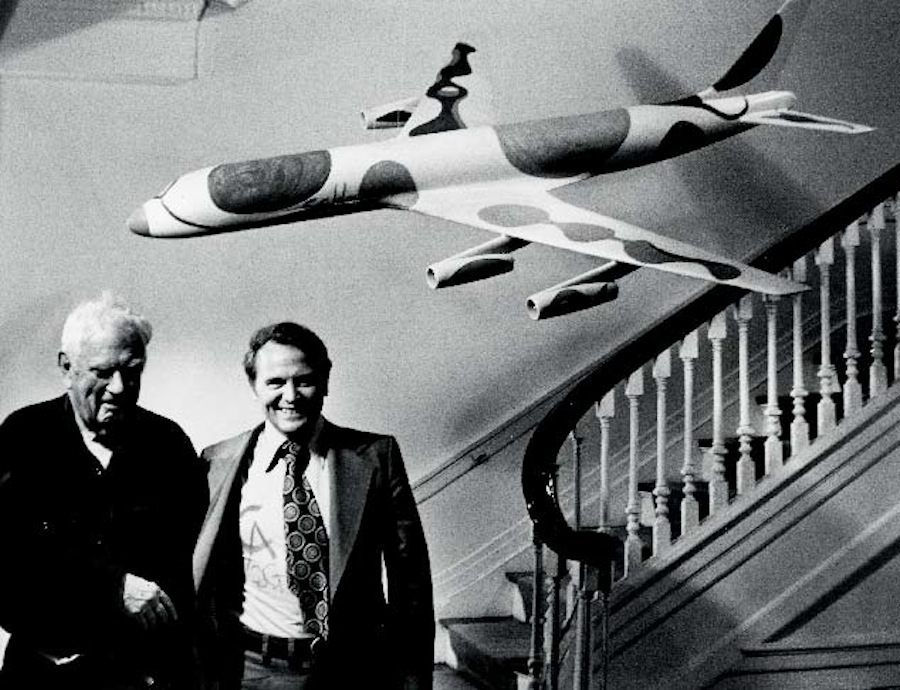
Master Artist Alexander Calder and advertising executive George Gordon with Braniff Douglas DC-8 model painted by Mr. Calder in 1973.

In 1972, Gordon approached Alexander Calder about painting a full sized jet airliner. Calder, the creator of the Mobile and Stabile art forms, agreed to meet with Gordon who explained the project. Calder misunderstood and believed that Gordon was proposing that Calder paint toy airplanes. Calder was not interested. Gordon further explained that he wanted Calder to paint a full sized jet airliner and further explained that it would be the world's largest flying artwork. Calder was immediately interested and agreed.

Gordon introduced Calder to Braniff International Airways Chairman, Harding Lawrence. Gordon knew that Braniff was devoted to the art and fashion industries and thought that Braniff would be the best candidate for the revolutionary jet plane painting project. A contract was created where Calder would paint fifty gouaches for possible later use of the gouache designs on Braniff aircraft and create the design for a Braniff Douglas DC-8 jet liner, in a manner that would celebrate the airline's 25th year of service to the South American continent. The work would be titled Flying Colors. As a result of his brilliant work with this project, Gordon's agency Gordon and Shortt obtained the Braniff account in 1972 and would remain Braniff's ad agency until 1979 when it merged with Wells Rich Greene Agency.

Mr. Calder was commissioned to paint a second aircraft in 1975 under Gordon's direction. The aircraft was a Braniff Boeing 727-291 Trijet registered as N408BN, which was painted to celebrate the United States Bicentennial year of 1976. A vibrant red white and blue design was created by Calder and applied to the aircraft titled Flying Colors of the United States. A third design was commissioned in 1976 to celebrate Braniff's long associations with Mexico and would be titled Salute to Mexico. Calder was working on painting the test models for the design on the night he died, November 11, 1976. The Mexico design was revealed to the public at a special event in Acapulco, Mexico, in February 1977, but it was never applied to any Braniff aircraft.

In the late 1970s, Gordon attempted to assemble a group of investors to buy the original Calder Douglas DC-8 and Boeing 727 flying artworks. By the time he had gotten the financing to make the purchases, Braniff had already painted both aircraft in their latest color scheme. It is not known if the Calder hand painted engine nacelles from either aircraft were saved.

== Braniff Airways Account ==
As a result of his bringing Alexander Calder to Braniff Airways to paint a Braniff jet which would become the world's first flying mobile, he received the 25 million USD per year Braniff account, in 1972. While at Braniff he created the Flying Colors Campaign as well as the Elegance Campaign at the beginning and the end of the 1970s respectively. Gordon remained actively involved with the Braniff account until his retirement in 1980.

== East Hampton Aire ==
After Gordon's retirement from the advertisement business he turned his attention to the airline business of which he had become very experienced from his position at Eastern Airlines and from working on the Braniff account. In 1985, he formed East Hampton Aire, based at Wainscott, New York. Gordon created a revolutionary marketing strategy at East Hampton Aire. He pioneered the concept of operating airline hubs at smaller outlying airports. The innovation caught the attention of Houston, Texas-based Continental Airlines who bought Gordon's airline in 1993.

== The Calder Airplane Project ==
In 1999, Gordon co-founded The Calder Airplane Project, with Herman Roggeman. An artisan by trade, Roggeman was the owner of Metal Concepts of Cold Spring, New York. The Calder Airplane Project produced limited edition models of both aircraft that Alexander Calder had painted for Braniff Airways. After Calder’s death, Gordon also conceived of a series of mobiles and standing mobiles that were neither designed by Calder nor authorized by the Artist’s Estate. Among them is the erroneous L’Éléphant noir (also known as Sun, Moon and Stars; Celestial Elephant; Black Elephant; and Pink Elephant), made in an edition of 999 examples.

== Producer and professor ==
In 1988, Gordon became a theater producer. He received many awards an honors for his theatrical productions. In 1994, he produced "The Jeweler's Shop" Off Broadway and then at various Catholic churches throughout the Northeast for fifteen years. In 1997, George Stanley Gordon became an adjunct professor of entrepreneurship at the University of Connecticut Stamford's Graduate School of Business. Gordon retained this professorship until 1999.

== Honors ==
- The Clio
- Ad Man of the Year, Ad Age
- Marketing Man of the Year, Ad Age
- Outer Critics Circle Award, 1988, for producing "Oil City Symphony", as best Off-Broadway Musical
- Drama Desk Award

== Productions as producer ==
- "The Jeweler's Shop" by Pope John Paul The II, highly successful with a 30-day sold out run in Washington D.C.
- "Kensington Gardens", a musical based on the James Barrie story written in 1894 as a prequel to "Peter Pan"

== Retirement and death ==
Gordon retired from advertising in 1980, but remained very active with other business ventures and philanthropic endeavors. Gordon married twice, first to Olive Briggs with whom he had two daughters, Kimberly (Slayton) and Dana. He married Janet Morgan and became the father of two sons, George III and Troy. Gordon met his life partner, Nancy Wareham-Gordon, with whom he had one daughter, Chloe Wareham-Gordon.

Gordon had suffered from Lewy Body Dementia a severe neurological disease for many years during the 2000s. On April 22, 2013, Gordon died at the age of 86 at Calvary Hospital in Bronx, New York.
