= Braniff International Airways =

Airline of the United States (1928–1982)

Braniff International

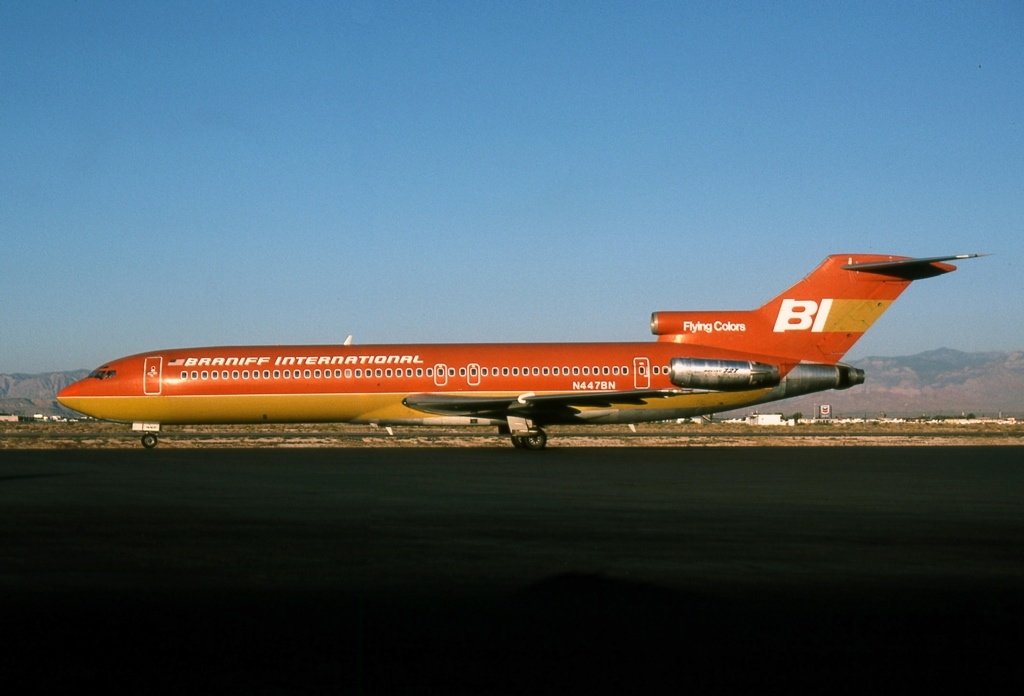
IATA	ICAO	Call sign
BN	BNF	BRANIFF
- Founded: May 29, 1928; November 3, 1930
- Commenced operations: June 20, 1928; November 13, 1930
- Ceased operations: May 12, 1982 (Only airline operations ceased; all subsidiaries continued in operation. Company is still in operation.)
- Operating bases: Boston; Dallas/Fort Worth (1974–1982); Dallas–Love (1935–1975); Denver–Stapleton; Chicago–O'Hare; Guam; Hong Kong–Kai Tak; Honolulu; Houston–Intercontinental; Kansas City; Lima; Los Angeles; Miami; Memphis; Minneapolis/St. Paul; New York–JFK; New York–LaGuardia; Newark; Washington–Dulles
- Frequent-flyer program: Braniff Travel Bonus Bonanza and Friends of the Orange 747s
- Subsidiaries: Braniff Education Systems, Inc.; Braniff Realty, Inc.; Braniff International Hotels, Inc.*; Braniff Guardian Services, Inc.; Driskill Operating Company*; Hoteles Internacional, SA de CV*; Braniff Airways Mexico, SA*; Braniff Airways Peru, SA; *
- Fleet size: 115 (as of December 1979)
- Destinations: 81 (as of November 1, 1979)
- Parent company: Braniff Airways, Incorporated (until 1964); Greatamerica Corporation (until 1967); Ling Temco Vought, Inc. (until 1971); Braniff International Corporation (1973–1983); Dalfort Corporation (1983–1988); The Texas Trust/Braniff Trust (1983–present)
- Headquarters: DFW Airport, Texas
- Key people: Charles Edmund Beard; Harding Lawrence; John J. Casey; Howard Putnam; Dale R. States; C. A. Cass, Jr.; Elizabeth B. Allen; Richard B. Cass; Collin L. Ice
- Founders: Paul Revere Braniff (first CEO); Thomas Elmer Braniff
- Website: www.braniffinternational.com

Braniff Airways, Incorporated, which operated as Braniff International Airways from 1948 until 1965, and then Braniff International from 1965 until the cessation of air operations, was a trunk carrier, a scheduled airline in the United States that operated from 1928 until 1982 and continues today as a retailer, hotelier, travel service, and branding and licensing company, administering the former airline's employee pass program and other airline administrative duties. Braniff's routes were primarily in the Midwestern and Southwestern United States, Mexico, Central America, and South America. In the late 1970s, it expanded to Asia and Europe. The airline ceased air carrier operations in May 1982 because of high fuel prices, credit card interest rates, and extreme competition from the large trunk carriers and the new airline startups created by the Airline Deregulation Act of December 1978. In addition, the direct legislative requirements of the ADA were not followed or implemented by the Civil Aeronautics Board (CAB) , which in turn became an advantage to the larger air carriers and a disadvantage to carriers Braniff's size. Two later airlines used the Braniff name: the Hyatt Hotels-backed Braniff, Inc. in 1983–89 and Braniff International Airlines, Inc. in 1991–92.

In early 2015, the private irrevocable trust (The Texas Trust) that owns and administers Braniff's intellectual property and certain other company assets since 1983 released the assets to a private entity associated with the trust, which founded a series of new Braniff companies that were incorporated in Oklahoma, for historical purposes and for administration of the Braniff trademarks, copyrights, and other intellectual property. These companies included Braniff Air Lines, Inc., Paul R. Braniff, Inc., Braniff Airways, Incorporated, Braniff International Hotels, Inc., and Braniff International Corporation. During 2017 and 2018, some of the original Braniff companies were reinstated for historical purposes and administration of Braniff's intellectual property assets, including those of Mid-Continent Airlines, Pan American Grace Airways, and Long and Harman Airlines, Inc. Braniff International Hotels, Inc., operates 19 hotels and restaurants today in the United States and South America. However, in early 2022, the private trust that originally owned Braniff's intellectual property since 1983 reacquired these assets along with the original Braniff companies and corresponding assets.

== The corporate evolution of Braniff International ==
In 1926, the first Braniff airline entity, Braniff Air Lines, Inc., was incorporated in Oklahoma; in 1928, the company was reincorporated as Paul R. Braniff, Inc., again in Oklahoma; in 1930, the company was reincorporated as Braniff Airways, Incorporated in Oklahoma; in 1946, the company became publicly known under the trade name Braniff International Airways. In 1966, the company was reincorporated as Braniff Airways, Incorporated, in Nevada; in 1973, the company was reincorporated as Braniff International Corporation and Braniff Airways, Incorporated, became the wholly owned subsidiary of Braniff International; in 1983, the company was reincorporated in Delaware as Dalfort Corporation, which included Braniff, Inc., as the wholly owned airline subsidiary of Dalfort Corporation; in 1990, the company was reincorporated in Delaware as Braniff International Airlines, Inc.; and in 2015, the company was reincorporated as Braniff Airways, Incorporated, in Oklahoma, which included its operating subsidiaries and original parent company.

== History ==
=== Braniff Air Lines, Inc. ===
In April 1926, Paul Revere Braniff incorporated Braniff Air Lines, Inc., which was a planned flight school and aircraft maintenance entity that never came to fruition. However, the name and company were retained by his brother, Thomas Elmer Braniff, and him until 1932.

=== Oklahoma Aero Club ===
In 1927, Paul R. Braniff, his brother Thomas, and several investors formed Oklahoma Aero Club to fly the founding executives using a Stinson Detroiter, purchased by Paul Braniff, registered as NC1929, on hunting, fishing, and business trips. Paul Braniff was the sole pilot, and flew the investors to their meetings. These included Frank Phillips, founder of Phillips Petroleum; E. E. Westervelt, manager of Southwest Bell Telephone; Fred Jones, Ford dealership owner; Virgil Browne of Coca-Cola Company; and Walter A. Lybrand, an Oklahoma City attorney.

Scheduling conflicts between the executives caused the new venture to be disbanded. Eventually, the Braniff brothers, Mr. Lybrand, and Mr. Westervelt bought out the interests of the other investors.

=== Paul R. Braniff, Inc. ===
Second Braniff Airlines logo, circa 1928–30, after the company was sold to Universal Aviation of St. Louis, Missouri, in April 1929

In the spring of 1928, insurance magnate Thomas Elmer Braniff founded an air carrier, maintenance, aircraft dealer, and flight school organization with his brother Paul, called Paul R. Braniff, Inc., which did business as Tulsa-Oklahoma City Airline. The new company, founded in May 1928, began regularly scheduled service from Oklahoma City, Oklahoma, and Tulsa, Oklahoma, using six-passenger Lockheed Vega single-engined aircraft on June 20, 1928.

The first flight was flown by Paul Braniff along with the company mechanic. The flight from Oklahoma City SW 29th Street Airport to Tulsa McIntire Airport was uneventful, but the return flight was delayed several hours for thunderstorms in the area. The one-way fare between the two cities was $12.50 or $20.00 round trip with a baggage allowance of 25 pounds and a charge of 10 cents for each pound over the maximum allowable amount. The fare included ground transportation from both airports to the downtown areas of each city, which was provided by Yellow Cab Company. The new airline was solely dependent on passenger-carrying fares for its revenue, since it had not entered into any mail or express contracts with the United States Post Office.

=== Universal Airlines and Braniff Air Lines, Inc. ===
The new Braniff venture was profitable within a month of service inauguration, but with the weakening economic conditions, the company found itself in need of a merger partner. In 1929, the Braniff brothers sold the assets of the company (the Paul R. Braniff, Inc., company organization was retained by the Braniff brothers) to Universal Aviation Corporation of St. Louis, Missouri, when the organization started operating as Braniff Air Lines, Inc. In 1930, the company was bought by the Aviation Corporation (AVCO), which was the predecessor of American Airlines.

Braniff Airlines, Inc., and the carrier grew by adding service from Oklahoma City to San Angelo, Texas, with intermediate stops at Wichita Falls, Breckenridge, and Abilene, Texas, by the summer of 1929 and service at Denison, Texas, was added on July 5, 1929. An additional route was operated between Oklahoma City and Ft. Worth with intermediate stops at Wewoka, Oklahoma, and Dallas Love Field and a third route operated between Oklahoma City and Tulsa with intermediates stops at Wewoka and Seminole, Oklahoma, with all beginning on July 15, 1929 (this is most likely when the first Braniff service began at Dallas Love Field). The new airline performed as one of the best in the Universal System with a 99% completion rate reported during the month of July 1929 and the airline also led the other divisions in number of passengers carried.

Service was added between Oklahoma City and Amarillo during the summer of 1929. Package express and air freight service was added to the list of Braniff services on September 1, 1929, and included Dallas Love Field.

=== Braniff Airways, Incorporated ===
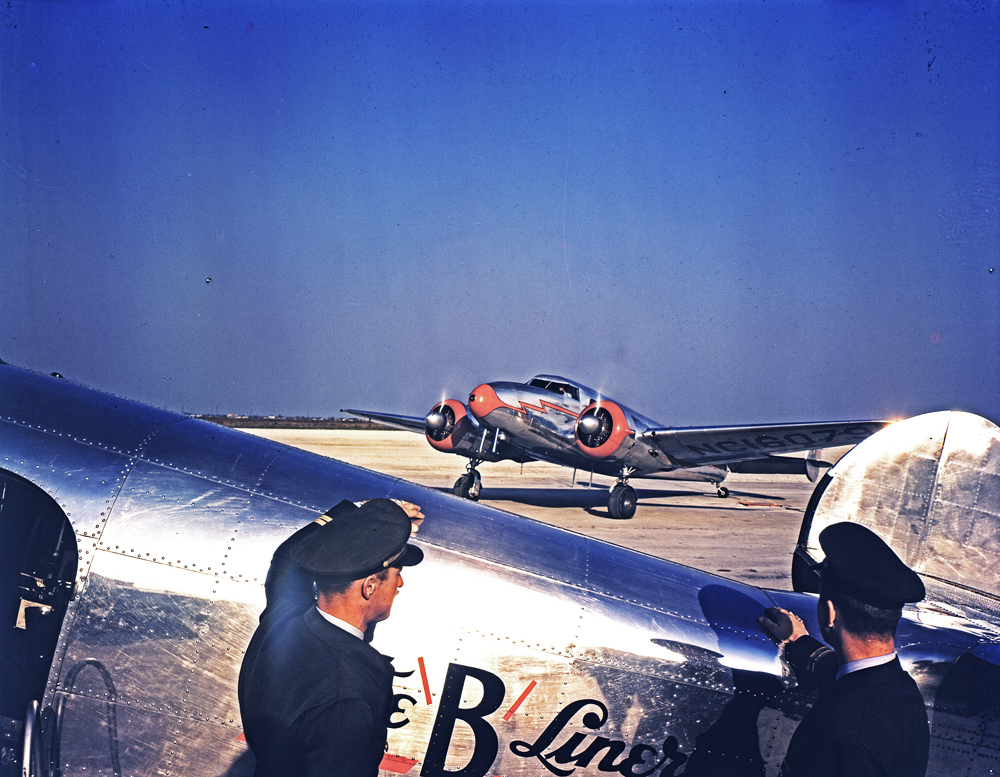
Braniff pilots outside a "B-Liner" Lockheed Model 10 Electra, Houston Municipal Airport, 1940: In the background is a Lockheed Model 12 Electra Junior.

In the fall of 1930, Tom and Paul Braniff once again founded a new airline called Braniff Airways, Incorporated, which was organized on November 3, 1930, and began service on November 13, 1930, between Oklahoma City and Tulsa and Oklahoma City and Wichita Falls Texas. Braniff Airways purchased two six-passenger, 450-horsepower Lockheed L-5 Vega single-engined aircraft capable of cruising at speeds of 150 miles per hour. Braniff's advertising touted the new carrier as the World's Fastest Airline.

Braniff quickly expanded its route system to include Kansas City Fairfax Airport on December 5, 1930. The new service operated nonstop between Kansas City and Tulsa and additional new cities were added in early 1931. By the end of 1930, the airline had added new service to its route map and employed six people and the new service between Tulsa and Kansas City had increased system route mileage to 241 miles. On February 25, 1931, Braniff welcomed in the new year by adding Chicago Midway Airport to its route map. The new service operated nonstop between Kansas City and Chicago once each day. The flight originated at Wichita Falls and continued to Midway Airport with intermediate stops at Oklahoma City, Tulsa, and Kansas City.

The summer of 1931 welcomed St Louis to the Braniff system on June 15, with nonstop service offered between St Louis and both Chicago and Tulsa. Additional Lockheed Vegas were added to the fleet during 1931 and 1932.

=== Braniff's first airmail route ===
The fledgling airline shut down to reorganize in March 1933, with the company airborne again in less than a year. Paul Braniff, travelled to Washington, DC, to petition for a Chicago-Dallas airmail route. The United States Postal Service granted Braniff their first airmail route soon after, and the new route was inaugurated in May 1934, which effectively saved the company from failure. In early 1935, Braniff became the first airline to fly from Chicago to the U.S.–Mexico border. In August 1935, Paul Braniff left to pursue other opportunities and Charles Edmund Beard was placed in charge of daily operations. In 1954, Beard was appointed president and CEO of Braniff with Fred Jones of Oklahoma City becoming chairman of the board.

=== Midwestern expansion ===
On December 28, 1934, Braniff purchased Dallas-based Long and Harman Air Lines, that operated passenger and mail routes from Amarillo to Brownsville and Galveston. Braniff Airways merged with the company on December 28, 1934, and began operating Long and Harman's routes on January 1, 1935, which took the airline from Chicago to Brownsville, Texas, and as far west as Amarillo, Texas.

=== Wartime service ===
During the war, Braniff remanded all of its Douglas DC-2 fleet and a substantial number of its new 21-passenger Douglas DC-3 fleet to the United States Army Air Forces. The DC-3 had just entered the fleet in December 1939. All of the Airline's DC-2s were given to the military for wartime service and none were accepted back into the fleet at the end of the war. Besides offering its aircraft to the United States military, it also leased its facilities at Dallas Love Field to the military, which became a training site for pilots and mechanics.

Braniff was given a contract to operate a military cargo flight between Brownsville, Texas, and Panama City/Balboa City, in the Canal Zone. The route was called the Banana Run because Braniff's pilots made agreements with the banana producers in Panama to move their bananas to the United States to sell. Because of the war, they could not fly their produce out of the country, but Braniff devised at least a small way to assist the growers. Because of Braniff's superb service during the war and over the Banana Run, the airline was rewarded with a significant international route award just a year after the war ended.

=== Aerovias Braniff formed ===
Thomas Elmer Braniff created a Mexican-based airline, Aerovias Braniff, in 1943. Service was inaugurated in March 1945, after the carrier received its operating permits from the Mexican government. Aerovias Braniff operated domestic flights in Mexico between Nuevo Laredo, Monterrey, and Mexico City, and also between Mexico City, Puebla, Veracruz (city) and Merida, Mexico. The August 1946 Braniff Airways system timetable indicates that Braniff was operating scheduled passenger flights at this time on a roundtrip routing of Chicago - Kansas City - Dallas - San Antonio - Laredo - Nuevo Laredo which connected with the Aerovias Braniff service. The new company, owned by Mr. Braniff, operated three 21-passenger Douglas DC-3s that had been allocated to the carrier from the United States War Surplus Administration in February, 1945.

Mr. Braniff had applied to the federal Civil Aeronautics Board (CAB) for authority to merge Aerovias Braniff with Braniff Airways, Inc. However, the Mexican government suspended Aerovias' Braniff's operating permits in October 1946, under pressure from Pan American Airways, Inc., and merger of the two carriers was not approved by the CAB. Braniff was allowed to operate a charter service in Mexico for a brief period in 1947, but that was also discontinued, and service was not commenced again until 1960.

=== Latin America route award ===
After World War II, on May 19, 1946, the CAB awarded Braniff routes to the Caribbean, Mexico, and Central and South America, competing with Pan American-Grace Airways, with this airline also being known as Panagra, which Braniff would eventually acquire and merge with during the late 1960s. The CAB awarded Braniff a 7719 statute-mile route from Dallas to Houston to Havana, Balboa, C.Z., Panama, Guayaquil, Lima, La Paz, Asunción, and then to Buenos Aires, Argentina, and also a route from Asunción to São Paulo and Rio de Janeiro, Brazil. At that time, the airline changed its trade name to "Braniff International Airways" (the official corporate name remained Braniff Airways, Incorporated) and flights to South America via Cuba and Panama began on June 4, 1948, with a routing of Chicago – Kansas City – Dallas – Houston – Havana – Balboa, C.Z. – Guayaquil – Lima (Lima service did not begin until June 18, 1948). The route was then extended in February 1949 to La Paz and in March 1949, to Rio de Janeiro, Brazil. Douglas DC-4s and Douglas DC-6s flew to Rio; initially, DC-3s flew Lima to La Paz. Braniff was the first airline authorized by the CAB to operate jet-assisted take-off aircraft (DC-4s) at La Paz.

Braniff inaugurated new service from Lima, Peru, to Rio de Janeiro, Brazil, with a stop at São Paulo, added in October 1950. Service was extended in March 1950 from La Paz to Asunción, Paraguay, and in May 1950 to Buenos Aires, Argentina. Argentine President Juan Perón and his famed wife Evita Perón participated in the festivities at the Palacio Casa Rosada in Buenos Aires. In October 1951, departures from Dallas became daily - three a week to Buenos Aires and four to Rio de Janeiro. Beginning in 1951, flights to South America stopped at Miami, but Braniff did not carry domestic passengers to or from Dallas or Houston to or from Miami.

=== Mid-Continent Airlines merger ===
By October 1951, Braniff flew to 29 airports in the US, from Chicago and Denver south to Brownsville, Texas, to Central America, Cuba, and South America.

After months of negotiations, Braniff acquired Mid-Continent Airlines, a small Kansas City-based trunk line, on August 16, 1952. The merger added numerous cities, including Minneapolis/St. Paul, Sioux City, and Sioux Falls in the North; Des Moines, Omaha, and St. Louis in the Midwest; and Tulsa, Shreveport, and New Orleans in the South. The acquisition of the Minneapolis/St. Paul to Kansas City route (with stops in Des Moines and Rochester, Minnesota) was of particular interest to Braniff, as Mid-Continent had been awarded this route instead of Braniff in 1939.

After the merger, Braniff operated 75 aircraft and over 4000 employees, including 400 pilots. In 1955, Braniff was the 10th-largest US airline by passenger miles and 9th-largest by domestic passenger miles.

With the addition of the South America route system, merger with Mid-Continent Airlines, and reduction in mail subsidy on the Mid-Continent system, Braniff International Airways recorded a US$1.8 million operating loss during 1953. Aircraft that were scheduled to be disposed of offset the loss and the company recorded a meager US$11,000 net income. An increase in mail subsidy, requested by Mr. Braniff before his death, was granted in 1954, and the company returned to profitability.

=== Deaths of the Braniff brothers ===
On January 10, 1954, Braniff's founder Thomas Elmer Braniff died when a Grumman flying boat owned by United Gas crash-landed on the shore of Wallace Lake, 15 miles outside of Shreveport, Louisiana, due to icing. According to information from Captain George A. Stevens: "Mr. Braniff was on a hunting expedition with a group of important citizens of Louisiana. They were returning to Shreveport from a small duck-hunting lake near Lake Charles, Louisiana, in a Grumman Mallard aircraft with no deicing system. The wings iced up on approach to landing in Shreveport, and the plane lost altitude. One of the wings hit cypress stumps, and the plane crashed against the shore. It caught fire and all 12 lives aboard were lost."

Braniff Executive Vice President Charles Edmund Beard became the first non-Braniff family member to assume the role of president of the airline after Tom Braniff's death. Mr. Beard gathered Braniff employees together at the Braniff hangar at Love Field on January 18, 1954, to announce that the airline would move forward and assured the public that the airline would continue. In February 1954, Mrs. Bess Thurman Braniff was appointed a vice president of the company. She was instrumental in calming the fears of Braniff's creditors, which became concerned, especially after the losses incurred in 1953, quickly followed by the loss of Mr. Braniff.

Paul R. Braniff died in June 1954 from complications from pneumonia and from throat cancer. Tom Braniff's wife, Bess Thurman Braniff, also died in August 1954, of cancer. Tom's son, Thurman Braniff, was killed in a training plane crash at Oklahoma City in 1937, and his daughter Jeanne Braniff Terrell died in 1948 from complications of childbirth. Jeanne Braniff's child died two days after birth and her husband Alexander Terrell died a year later in 1949.

=== New equipment and facilities ===
Charles Edmund Beard led Braniff into the jet age. The first jets were four Boeing 707-227s; a fifth crashed on a test flight when still owned by Boeing. Braniff was the only airline to order the 707-227 because their low density and powerful engines were perfectly suited to Braniff's thin and high routes from the US mainland to South America. In 1971, Braniff sold the jets to British West Indies Airways, an airline based in the Caribbean. Boeing 720s were added in the early 1960s. In 1965, Braniff's fleet was about half jet, comprising 707s, 720s, and British Aircraft Corporation One-Eleven jetliners. The long-range Boeing 707-320C intercontinental model was then introduced. However, all the 707s, 720s, and One-Elevens were subsequently removed from the fleet in favor of the ideally suited Boeing 727 Trijet. Braniff's last piston-aircraft schedule was operated with a Convair 340 in September 1967, and the last Lockheed L-188 Electra turboprop service was flown in April 1969.

In February 1957, Braniff moved into a new headquarters located temporarily in the new Exchange Bank Building at Exchange Park, a high-rise office development within sight of Dallas Love Field. The airline was required to move into the temporary building until its new 10-story Braniff Tower also in Exchange Park was ready for move-in on Valentine's Day 1958. Braniff remained in this building until December 1978, when it moved into its spacious new Braniff Place World Headquarters on the west side of DFW Airport. The airline opened a maintenance and operations base with over 433,000 square feet on the east side of Dallas Love Field at 7701 Lemmon Avenue in October 1958. The airline occupied the facility until the late 1980s, with the Braniff, Inc. (Braniff II) holding company, Dalfort, remaining there until 2001.

=== Boeing Super Sonic Transport (SST) ===
In April 1964, Braniff made deposits on two Boeing 2707 Supersonic Transports, $100,000 per aircraft. This would give Braniff slots number 38 and 44 when the SST began production. President Beard said the two aircraft would be used on the carrier's US-to-Latin America flights, where the Boeing 707 was performing satisfactorily. When this deposit was made, the SST program was being financed by the US government. In 1971, Congress cancelled the program, against the Nixon administration's wishes.

=== Greatamerica ===
In 1964, Troy Post, chairman of Greatamerica Corporation, an insurance holding company based in Dallas, purchased Braniff and National Car Rental as part of an expansion of holdings and growth outside the insurance business. Braniff and National were chosen after Greatamerica CFO Charles Edward Acker identified them as underused and undermanaged companies. Acker had stated in a 1964 study that Braniff's conservative management was hampering the growth that the "jet age" required, in part by cash purchase of new planes instead of financing them, diverting working capital from growth initiatives. As part of the acquisition, Acker became executive vice president and CFO of Braniff.

Troy Post hired Harding Lawrence, executive vice president of Continental Airlines, who was responsible for a 500% increase in sales at the Los Angeles-based carrier during his tenure, as the new president of Braniff International. Lawrence was determined to give Braniff a glossy, modern, and attention-getting image. Over the next 15 years, his expansion into new markets – combined with ideas unorthodox for the airline industry – led Braniff to record financial and operating performance, expanding its earnings tenfold despite typical passenger load factors around 50%.

=== Mary Wells and "The End of the Plain Plane" ===
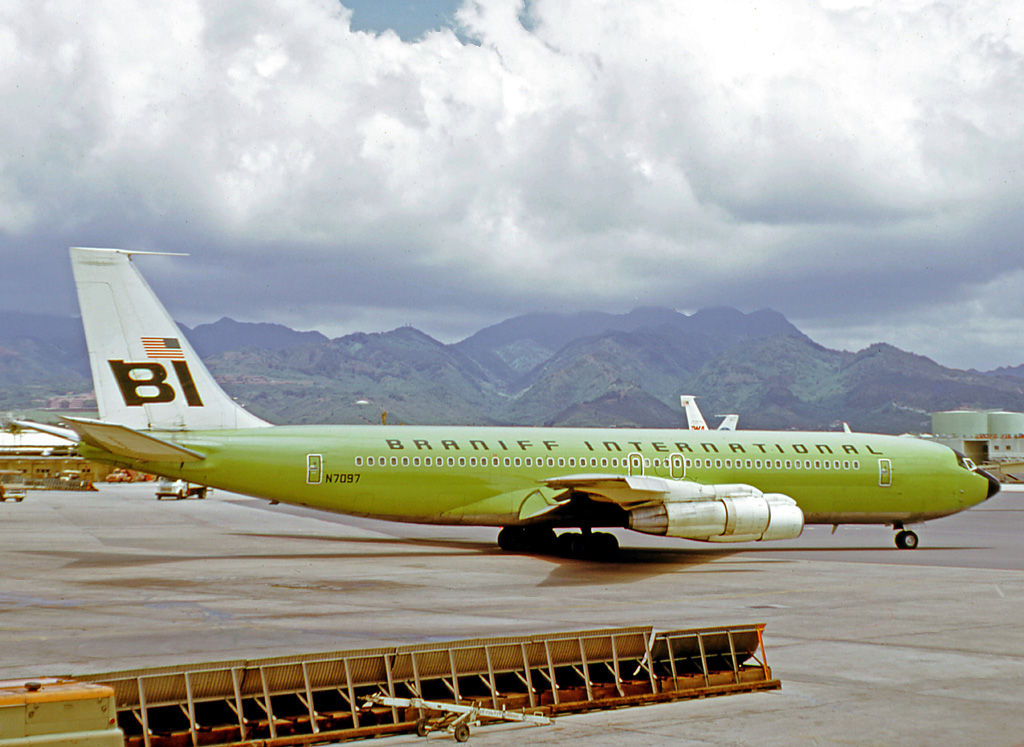
Boeing 707-327C of Braniff International at Honolulu Airport in 1971

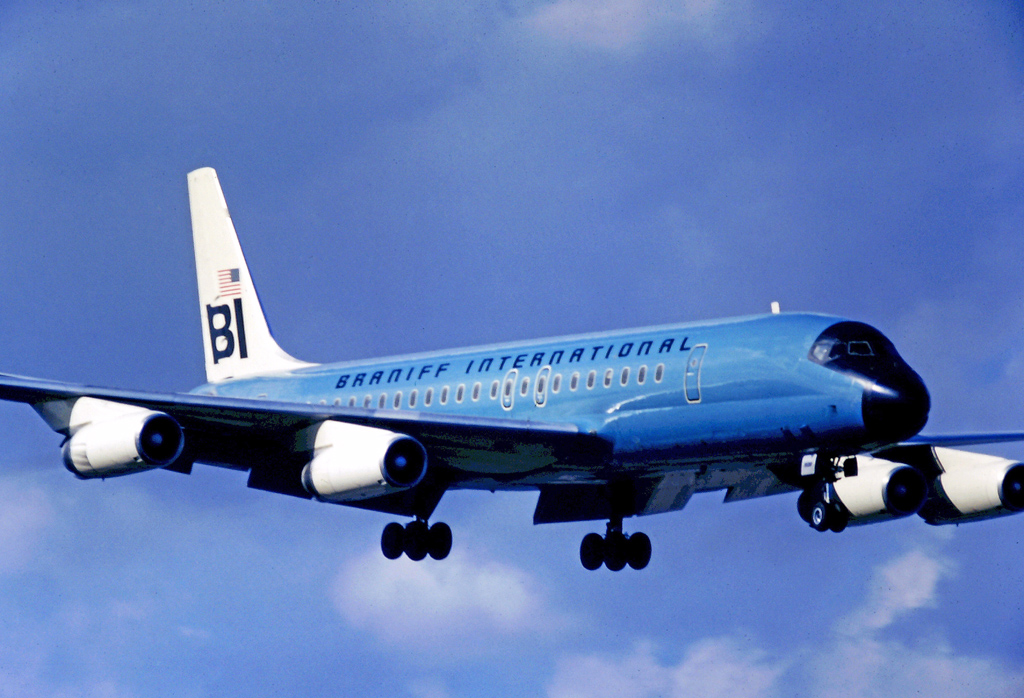
Braniff International Douglas DC-8-62 landing at Miami International Airport in 1971

To begin the overhaul of Braniff's image, Lawrence hired Jack Tinker and Partners, who assigned advertising executive Mary Wells – later Mary Wells Lawrence after her November 1967 marriage to Harding Lawrence in Paris – as account leader. First on the agenda was to overhaul Braniff's public image — including the 1959 Red and Blue El Dorado Super Jet livery, which Wells saw as "staid". New Mexico architect Alexander Girard, Italian fashion designer Emilio Pucci, and shoe designer Beth Levine were hired, and with this new talent, Braniff began the "End of the Plain Plane" campaign.

At Girard's recommendation, the old livery was dropped in favor of a single color on each plane, selected from a palette of rich and mid-century styled hues such as "Lemon Yellow" and "Periwinkle Blue Lavender", dubbed the Alexander Girard Solid Color Scheme. He favored a small "BI" logo and small titles and originally wanted each aircraft painted in a solid light brown color. However, Braniff engineering and Braniff's advertising department modified Girard's single color idea, enlarged the "BI" logo, and added white wings and tails. This, ironically, was based on the 1930s Braniff Lockheed Vega color schemes, which also carried colorful paint with white wings and tails. The new fleet carried such colors as beige, ochre, orange, turquoise, baby blue, medium blue, lemon yellow, and lavender/periwinkle blue. Lavender was dropped after a month, due to the similarity in coloration to the witch moth (Ascalapha odorata), a sign of bad luck in Mexican mythology.

Fifteen colors were used during the 1960s (Harper and George modified Girard's original seven colors in 1967), in combination with 57 variations of Herman Miller fabrics. Many of the color schemes were applied to aircraft interiors, gate lounges, ticket offices, and even the corporate headquarters. Art to complement the color schemes was flown in from Mexico, Latin America, and South America. Girard designed an extensive line of furniture for Braniff's ticket offices and customer lounges. This furniture was made available to the public by Herman Miller, for a year, in 1967.

Pucci used a series of nautical themes for crew uniforms for flight attendants, pilots, and ground and terminal personnel. For the hostesses, Pucci used "space age" themes, including plastic Bolas (first-edition zippered version) Space Helmets (second edition with snaps) as they were dubbed by Pucci. These clear plastic bubbles, which resembled Captain Video helmets and which Braniff termed "RainDome", were to be worn between the terminal and the plane to prevent bouffant hairstyles from being disturbed by outside elements. "RainDomes" were dropped the following year because the helmets cracked easily, no place to store them was on the aircraft, and new jetway installation at many airports made them unnecessary. However, the helmets were still approved for use through 1967. For the footwear, Beth Levine created plastic boots and designed two-tone calfskin boots and shoes. Later uniforms and accessories were composed of interchangeable parts, which could be removed and added as needed.

Emilio Pucci designed additional new uniforms for Braniff through 1975. This included the updated 1966 Supersonic Derby Collection, 1968 Pucci Classic Collection, 1971 747 Braniff Place Pant Dress Collection, 1972 727 Braniff Place Pant Dress Collection, 1973 Pucci Blue Pilot Uniform, 1974 Pucci The Classic Collection, and finally in 1975, the Flying Colors Collection, which only included impressive white coveralls with red and blue Flying Colors logo for maintenance personnel. In 1977, the responsibility for uniforms passed on to Halston.

=== MAC Charters ===
In 1966, Braniff obtained a government contract to transport military personnel from the US mainland to Vietnam and other military outposts in the Pacific region. Braniff also operated flights to and from Hawaii for R&R furloughs for military personnel during the Vietnam War. The Military Airlift Command (MAC) routes were expanded in the Pacific and added to the Atlantic side in 1966. The last Braniff MAC charter associated with the Vietnam War was flown in 1975.

=== Merger with Panagra ===
In February 1967, Braniff purchased Pan American-Grace Airways, which was also known as Panagra from shareholders of Pan American World Airways and W. R. Grace, increasing its presence and making it the leading US airline in South America. The merger was effective on February 1, 1967, and Panagra's remaining piston-engined airliners were retired. Panagra operated early-model Douglas DC-8 jets at this time, which were a new addition to the Braniff fleet; a Panagra order for five long-range Douglas DC-8-62 jetliners was then taken up by Braniff, and deliveries began in late 1967, replacing the older Series 30 Panagra DC-8s by the end of 1967.

Revenue passenger miles (millions)(Scheduled services only)
	Braniff	Panagra	Mid-Continent
1951	332	126	9
1955	680	161	(merged 1952)
1960	1181	198	
1965	1804	278	
1970	4262	(merged 1967)	
1975	6290		

=== "When You Got It — Flaunt It" ===
Under the leadership of George Lois and his advertising firm Lois, Holland Calloway, Braniff started a campaign that presented stars such as Andy Warhol, Sonny Liston, Salvador Dalí, Whitey Ford, the Playboy Bunny, and other celebrities of the time flying Braniff. After the End of the Plain Plane campaign, it became one of the most celebrated marketing efforts Madison Avenue had ever produced, blending style and arrogance. The key advertising slogan was "When you got it — flaunt it."

Management considered the campaign a success. Braniff reported an 80% increase in business during the life of the campaign in spite of an economic downturn the following year.

=== "Terminal of the Future" and JetRail ===
Braniff opened the "Terminal of the Future" at Dallas Love Field in late December 1968 and the Jetrail Car Park people mover monorail system in April 1970. Both operated until January 1974. Jetrail was the world's first fully automated monorail system, taking passengers from remote parking lots at Love Field to the Braniff terminal. Braniff was a leading partner in the planning of Dallas/Fort Worth International Airport and contributed many innovations to the airline industry during this time.

=== Braniff International Hotels ===
Braniff International Hotels operates/licenses/owns 19 hotels and restaurants throughout the United States, Central and South America. Braniff hotels offer discounted travel throughout its network for both Braniff retirees and employees as well as the general public.

=== Remaking the jet fleet ===
Braniff had been one of the first U.S. operators of the BAC One-Eleven (and the first U.S. airline to order the twin jet), but in 1965, Lawrence ordered 12 new Boeing 727-100s and cancelled most of the remaining One-Eleven orders. The 727s had been selected before Lawrence's arrival, but no orders had been placed. These planes were the "quick change" (B727-100C) model, with a large freight-loading door on the left side just aft of the flight deck. This allowed Braniff to begin late-night cargo service, while the aircraft carried passengers during the day, in August 1966. This doubled the 727 use rate and allowed Braniff to open the new cargo business, dubbed AirGo. The new 727s could also be outfitted in a mixed cargo/passenger combi aircraft configuration and Braniff did operate "red eye" overnight services carrying cargo in the forward section with seating for 51 passengers in the rear coach compartment.

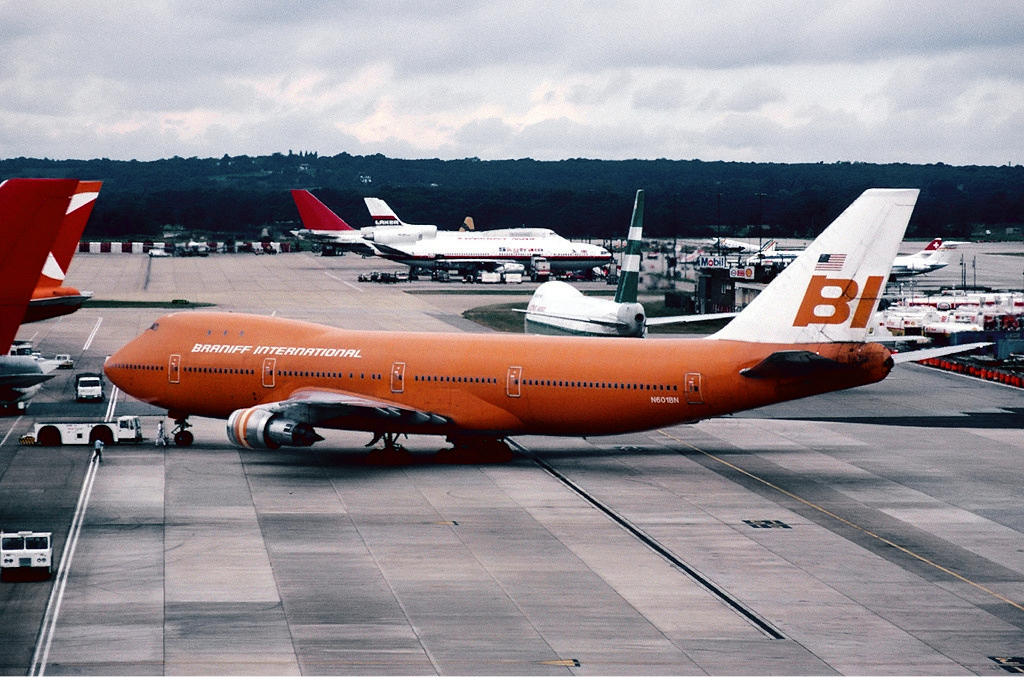
Boeing 747-100 at London Gatwick Airport in 1981

In 1970, Braniff accepted delivery of the 100th Boeing 747 built – a 747-127, N601BN – and began flights from Dallas to Honolulu, Hawaii, on January 15, 1971. This plane, dubbed "747 Braniff Place" and "the Most Exclusive Address in the Sky", was Braniff's flagship, and it flew an unprecedented 15 hours per day with a 99% dispatch reliability rate over the Transpacific long route. In 1978, N601BN flew the first flight from Dallas/Fort Worth to London. The Braniff 747 livery of bright orange led to the aircraft being nicknamed "the Great Pumpkin". The popularity of "the Great Pumpkin" led to extensive publicity, and even the licensing of a scale model by the Airfix model company.

The Boeing 727 became the backbone of the Braniff fleet. The trijet was the key aircraft in the 1971 Fleet Standardization Plan that called for three aircraft types; the Boeing 727 primarily operated on domestic services, the Boeing 747 for Hawaii, and the Douglas DC-8 for South America. This plan would lower operating costs. When Lawrence took office in May 1965, Braniff operated 13 different aircraft types. Braniff eventually ordered several variants of the 727 including the "quick change" cargo/passenger combi aircraft variant, the stretched 727-200, and later the 727-200 Advanced. Lawrence also increased utilization of the fleet.

In 1969, the Lockheed L-188 Electras were retired, making Braniff an all-pure-jet airline. By the mid-1970s, Braniff's fleet of 727s showed the efficiencies that a single type of aircraft could produce. The company's maintenance costs on the 727s were lower than the dual-pilot DC-9. In 1975, Braniff had one 747, 11 DC-8s, and 70 727s. The Douglas DC-8s were aging, and speculation arose whether new Boeing 757s, Boeing 767s, or Airbus A300s would replace the long-range DC-8-62s (which flew Braniff's South American routes including nonstops from Los Angeles and New York City to Bogotá, Colombia and Lima, Peru as well as nonstops from Miami and New York City to Buenos Aires) with McDonnell Douglas MD-80s possibly being introduced on shorter routes. In 1978, Braniff announced it had chosen the Boeing 757 and 767 to replace the DC-8s over its Latin America Division routes, but the airline never operated the 757, 767, A300, or MD-80.

=== Alexander Calder ===
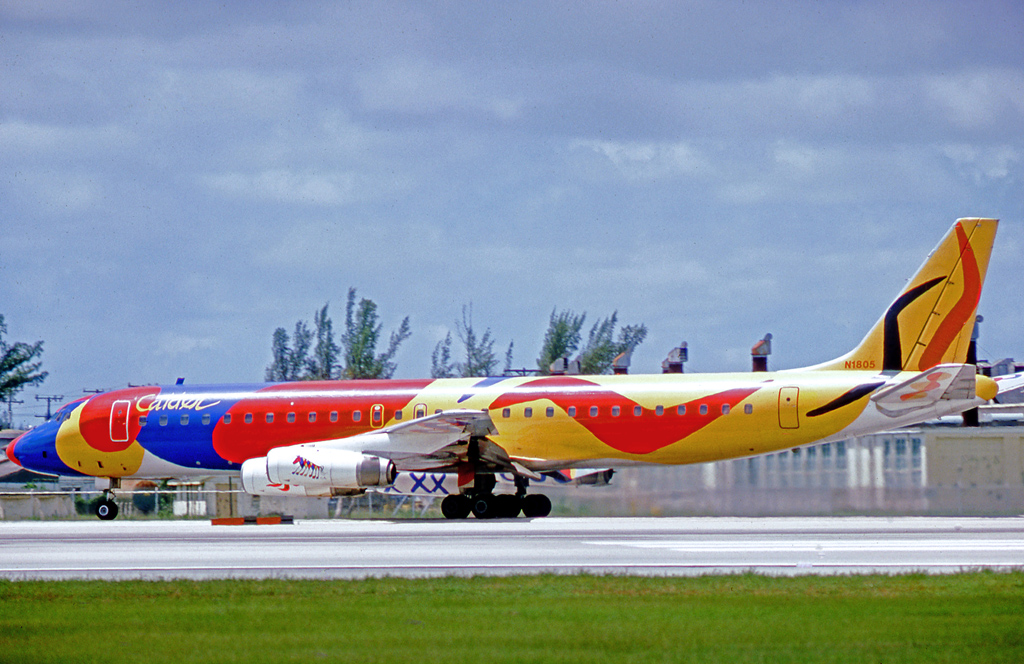
Braniff Douglas DC-8-62 wearing Alexander Calder's Flying Colors of South America design at Miami Airport in August 1975

In December 1972, American Modern Master Alexander Calder was commissioned by Braniff to paint an aircraft. Calder was introduced to Harding Lawrence by veteran advertising executive George Stanley Gordon, who eventually took over Braniff's advertising account. Calder's contribution was a Douglas DC-8 known simply as "Flying Colors of South America". In 1975, it was showcased at the Paris Air Show. Its designs reflected the bright colors and simple designs of South America and Latin America and was used mainly on South American flights.

Later in 1975, he debuted "Flying Colors of the United States" to commemorate the Bicentennial of the United States. This time, the aircraft was a Boeing 727-200. First Lady Betty Ford dedicated "Flying Colors of the United States" in Washington, DC, on November 17, 1975. Calder died in November 1976 as he was finalizing a third livery, termed "Flying Colors of Mexico" or "Salute to Mexico". Consequently, this livery was not used on any Braniff aircraft.

=== Halston and the Elegance Campaign ===
In the fall of 1976, Braniff commissioned American couturier Halston to bring an elegant and sophisticated feel to Braniff. The new Ultrasuede uniforms and Ultra Space leather aircraft interiors were dubbed the Ultra Look by Halston, who had used the term to describe his elegant fashions. The Ultra Look was applied to all uniforms and the entire Braniff fleet (including the two Calder aircraft). The Ultra Look was an integral part of Braniff's new Elegance Campaign, which was designed to herald the maturing of Braniff, as well as the look and feel of opulence throughout the airline's operation. Halston's uniforms and simple designs were praised by critics and passengers. A sleek new paint scheme, dubbed Ultra, was designed by Braniff's industrial design firm, Harper and George, along with Detroit auto company Cars and Concepts in conjunction with Halston. Iridescent colors of Chocolate Brown, Perseus Green, Mercury Blue, and Terra Cotta along with two metallic colors were matched with striking racing stripes called Power Paint Stripes, which served to enhance the elegant scheme with a sleek, racy feel.

=== Concorde SST ===
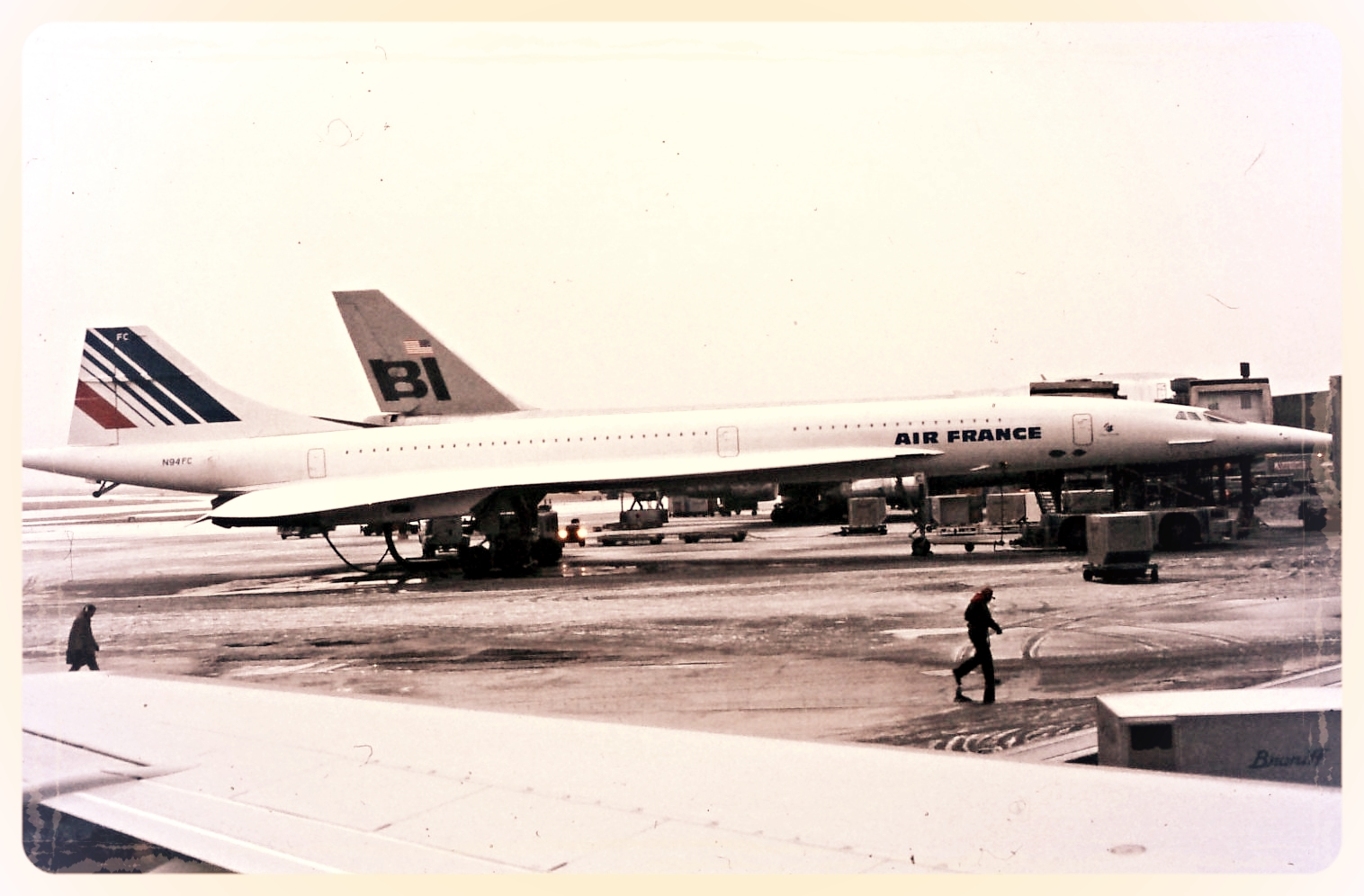
An Air France Concorde at Dallas-Fort Worth Airport in February 1980: During its time operating with Braniff, the aircraft wore an American registration only used on domestic flights.

In 1978, Braniff Chairman Harding L. Lawrence negotiated a unique interchange agreement to operate the Concorde over American soil, making it first time that Concorde was used for domestic—and fully overland—flights. Concorde service began on 12 January 1979 between Dallas/Fort Worth International Airport and Washington Dulles, with service to Paris and London on interchange flights with Air France and British Airways, respectively.

Flights between Dallas-Fort Worth and Washington Dulles airports were operated by Braniff's cockpit and cabin crews. During the domestic flights, the Braniff's registration numbers were affixed to the fuselage with temporary adhesive vinyl stickers. At Washington Dulles, the cockpit and cabin crews were replaced by ones from Air France and British Airways for the continued flight to Europe, and the temporary Braniff registration stickers were removed. This process was reversed after alighting in Washington Dulles from Europe for the flights to Dallas-Fort Worth. Due to the American noise regulations, Concordes were limited to Mach 0.95, yet flew at slightly above Mach 1.

Concorde service proved to be a loss leader, but it was good publicity for Braniff. In March 1979, fares Washington to Dallas were $128 coach, $154 first class and $169 on Concorde. Braniff later removed the surcharge. The domestic flights often had 15 passengers or fewer, while Braniff's Boeing 727 flights were nearly full despite being slower than Concorde. (In March 1979, 727s were scheduled 3 hr 15 min Washington to DFW while Concorde was 2 hr 50 min.) Braniff ended Concorde flights on June 1, 1980.

In spite of the service's less-than-stellar performance, the cost to Braniff was negligible thanks mainly to the agreements that Braniff negotiated with both British Airways and Air France. Braniff was fully reimbursed for any losses incurred as a result of the interchange agreement. All three carriers entered into the agreement for the purpose of promotion of Concorde in the United States and around the world. This key premise was highly successful. British Airways became concerned at the unprofitable stance that Concorde had taken and as a result of the Braniff interchange, critical studies were begun to determine how to make Concorde profitable. The results of these studies found that Concorde must be marketed as an ultra-luxury travel experience. Implementation of this program turned the Concorde program into a profitable, as well as prestigious, venture.

Braniff issued select promotional materials and postcards that presented a Concorde with orange cheat line that began at the tip of nose and continued to the end of tail, white BI logo (designed by Alexander Girard as part of "End of the Plain Plane" campaign in 1965) against orange vertical stabilizer, and 1978 Braniff Ultra Font for "Braniff" below the cheat line. The font was part of Braniff's updated 1978 Ultra livery that removed "INTERNATIONAL" from the name only on Boeing 727 and McDonnell Douglas DC-8-62 aircraft. Braniff's Boeing 747 aircraft continued to carry the "Braniff International" titles in the 1969 Harper and George International font. However, unlike Singapore Airline's Concorde, none of the Braniff Interchange Concordes was impressed with Braniff livery.

Braniff International Corp. Financial Results, 1972 thru 1981
	Pre-deregulation							Post-deregulation		
USD mm	1972	1973	1974	1975	1976	1977	1978	1979	1980	1981
Op revenue	383.9	445.6	552.4	598.9	679.7	791.2	972.1	1,346.3	1,452.1	1,189.0
Op profit(loss)	29.3	42.6	55.8	47.4	52.1	69.0	80.2	(38.4)	(107.5)	(94.8)
Net profit(loss)	17.2	23.2	26.1	16.0	26.4	36.6	45.2	(44.3)	(128.5)	(156.5)
Operating margin	7.6%	9.6%	10.1%	7.9%	7.7%	8.7%	8.2%	-2.9%	-7.4%	-8.0%
Net margin	4.5%	5.2%	4.7%	2.7%	3.9%	4.6%	4.7%	-3.3%	-8.8%	-13.2%

=== Deregulation and global expansion ===
Until 1980, Braniff was one of the fastest-growing and most-profitable airlines in the United States, but deregulation of the airline industry was introduced in October 1978, and Braniff – as well as many of the United States' major air carriers, especially the smaller national carriers such as Braniff – were caught in a peculiar predicament as a result of the unprecedented change in how airline business was conducted.

Lawrence accurately believed that the answer to deregulation was to expand Braniff's route system dramatically or face an immediate erosion of Braniff's highly profitable routes as a result of unbridled competition from especially the large trunk carriers along with the new low-cost startup carriers. Lawrence was shrewd and had always relied heavily on outside firms to assist with new ideas. He asked six key corporate advisor companies to recommend to Braniff what it could do to survive in a deregulated environment as a small carrier. All but one of the six companies recommended that Braniff attempt to grow into a larger carrier that could compete effectively with the Big 5 Mega carriers. The lone holdout suggested that Braniff abrogate its labor contract and reform itself into a low-cost airline with few frills, which was attempted unsuccessfully later in late 1981. Braniff was surrounded on all sides at Dallas/Ft. Worth, Kansas City, Chicago, Denver, Atlanta, and Miami, by the larger carriers, which were poised to immediately begin invading Braniff's long-held territory. These large carriers had in abundance what Braniff termed "City Power", which was the ability to use their massive assets to dominate a particular destination. Braniff, therefore in response, enlarged its domestic network by 50% on December 15, 1978, adding 16 new cities and 32 new routes, which Braniff stated was the "largest single-day increase by any airline in history". The expansion was successful operationally and financially.

Although the expansion of 1978 was successful (by late 1979, Braniff's market share moved significantly for the first time since the 1940s from an average of 4.5 to an unprecedented 6.5% market share, all directly related to the expansion program), it did not stop losses from beginning in late 1979 as a result of unprecedented rises in fuel costs and credit card interest rates of 20% and higher, coupled with general economic unrest and an unprecedented drop in load factor of 5 points in the fourth quarter due to the significant use of American Airlines and United Airlines discount fare coupons during the holiday travel season. As a result, Braniff reported its first operating loss since the recession of 1970. The operating loss was $39 million in 1979, then $120M in 1980 and $107M in 1981. The losses in 1980 were directly attributed to Braniff's slip in market share due to the erosion of its bread-and-butter routes and corresponding feed to the larger carriers such as American Airlines, Delta Air Lines, and United Airlines.

In 1979, international hubs were created in Boston and Los Angeles to handle expected increases in travel outside North America, while international service was increased from Dallas/Fort Worth. From Boston and Dallas/Fort Worth, new transatlantic Boeing 747 service to Europe was operated to Amsterdam, Brussels, Frankfurt, and Paris. From Los Angeles, new nonstop trans-Pacific Boeing 747 service was flown to Guam and Seoul with direct, no change-of-plane 747 flights being operated to Hong Kong and Singapore. Load factors on these routes were considerable, but the at-times competition Braniff faced from Asian carriers pushed Braniff's breakeven point even higher, making the routes unsuccessful once coupled with exorbitant fuel costs across the globe and the loss of significant feed from its domestic system due to severe competition from the new startup carriers and the larger mega airlines. This international expansion was also planned to have included flights to Tokyo, as well as an "oil run" between Dallas-Fort Worth, Houston, and Bahrain; however, these routes never commenced, although service to Bahrain was approved by the US government in 1979. Besides standard-model 747s, long-range 747SPs were acquired, as well, for these new international flights, with the 747 also being operated to South America. Also in 1979, Braniff began operating nonstop flights between Honolulu and Guam and Los Angeles, as well as one-stop service between Honolulu and Hong Kong via Guam in addition to its long-running nonstop service between Honolulu and Dallas/Fort Worth.

The main impediment to success after Braniff's expansion was fuel cost, which increased 94% during 1979, coupled with strong competition from larger carriers in both the domestic and Asia/Pacific systems. For the first time in airline history, fuel costs, which nearly doubled in 1979, exceeded labor as the largest operating cost for airlines. Braniff's fuel bill increased from $200 million in 1978 to more than $400 million in 1979, with 25% of this increase a result of increased flying, but 75% was solely due to the rise in fuel costs around the globe.

The expense of the new equipment and the costs associated with the new service and hubs increased Braniff's debt substantially, although it was still manageable. The driving forces behind Braniff's problems, though, were the unprecedented rise in fuel costs, which topped 104% increase during 1980, and the erosion the company experienced as large carriers such as United, Delta, and American, along with new low-cost startups, began taking Braniff's key routes that were protected prior to deregulation. This was the fear that Braniff and other small trunk carriers, such as National Airlines, Western Airlines, and Continental Airlines, had expressed concern about prior to deregulation. It was now coming true for all of these smaller carriers. As an example, Braniff's revenue for 1979 was one-third that of American's, which had moved its headquarters to Braniff's hometown, DFW Airport, in 1979.

For the first time in history beginning in 1979, the cost of fuel exceeded the cost of labor, which had been the airline industry's largest expense. Braniff's fuel costs rose from nearly US$200 million to US$400 million during 1979 and in spite of this huge increase in costs, the company still managed to implement service to multiple domestic destinations and expand across the Atlantic and Pacific and endure the airline coupon sales gimmicks used by passengers during the fourth quarter of 1979, which caused Braniff to lose five percentage points of load factor during the fourth quarter, and still only report a moderate loss of US$39 million, in comparison to Braniff's size. Had Braniff's fuel increased in 1977 by 94%, the company would have reported a loss of nearly US$100 million, which would have been catastrophic for any airline.

In late 1978, Braniff moved to a sprawling new headquarters, Braniff Place, just inside the western grounds of the airport. The beautiful employee playground/administration/training facility was the first of its kind and was later used as the model for Google and Apple headquarters design. Braniff's decreasing load factors combined with record-breaking fuel cost escalations, unfair and unbridled competition, unprecedented interest rates, and a national recession (the worst since the Great Depression of 1929), produced massive financial shortfalls, especially in 1980, which was caused by the severe recession that was affecting travel globally.

Harding Lawrence elected to retire in December 1980, effective January 7, 1981, after nearly 16 years (1965–1981) of service to the company. Dubbed the last airline maverick, Lawrence oversaw the carrier's rise from $100 million a year in revenue to more than $1.4 billion a year in revenue at his retirement.

By 1981, all 747 service to Asia and Europe with the exception of nonstop flights between Dallas/Fort Worth and London had been discontinued, although Braniff continued to operate 747s on international service to Bogotá, Buenos Aires, and Santiago in South America, as well as on domestic flights between Dallas/Fort Worth and Honolulu.

=== John J. Casey becomes president ===
On January 7, 1981, the board of directors elected John J. Casey as president, chief executive officer, and chairman of Braniff Airways, Incorporated, and Braniff International Corporation as a replacement to the outgoing and retiring Harding Lawrence. Former Braniff president Russel Thayer was elected as vice chairman of the board, William Huskins as executive vice president, Neal J. Robinson as executive vice president of marketing, and Edson "Ted" Beckwith as executive vice president of finance. Mr. Thayer had been extremely vocal about Braniff's critical position if deregulation were to take effect.

John Casey expanded Braniff's capacity during the summer of 1981, and traffic increased with a promise of the beginnings of a turnaround. However, an unforeseen strike by the Professional Air Traffic Controllers Organization (PATCO) caused delays and a decrease in traffic that actually enabled the carrier to regroup during the decrease in service. Casey then implemented the Braniff Strikes Back Campaign in the fall of 1981, streamlining the carrier's airfare structure into a simplified, two-tier fare system. As part of this campaign, some Boeing 727s were divided into Braniff Premier Service (traditional first-class service) and coach class. The remainder of the 727s were all coach class with reduced fares. The campaign was not successful, pushing Braniff's bread-and-butter business travelers over to traditional airlines with first class on all flights. Braniff had two options prior to deregulation - grow into a larger carrier to possess "city power" at its key hubs or become a low-cost carrier. Although Braniff was considered a low-cost carrier, it still possessed a seasoned and unionized work force with medical and pension plans, which were the same overhead costs as the larger trunk carriers. This was the same for Northwest, Western, National, and Continental Airlines.

=== Howard Putnam becomes president ===
In fall 1981, Braniff Chairman John Casey was told by the Braniff board that a new president needed to be found to try to curb Braniff's mounting losses. Casey met with Southwest Airlines President Howard A. Putnam and offered him the Braniff executive position. Putnam accepted the offer, but he required that his own financial manager from Southwest Airlines, Philip Guthrie, be allowed to follow him to Braniff.

Howard Putnam implemented a one-fare-structure plan called the Texas Class Campaign. Texas Class created a one-fare, one-service airline domestically and removed first class from all Braniff aircraft. Only flights to South America, London, and Hawaii offered full first-class services. In the program's first month in operation, December 1981, Braniff's revenues dropped from slightly over US$100 million per month to US$80 million. Braniff no longer had the revenue structure to maintain its cash requirements. In January 1982, Braniff recorded its first negative cash flow. Competition throughout the Braniff system, and increased service at DFW International Airport by American Airlines and Delta Air Lines, both of which operated hubs at DFW, caused further erosion in revenue.

=== Eastern leases South America routes ===
In early 1982, Braniff Chairman Howard Putnam decided to sell the Latin American Division. Negotiations had been underway with Pan American World Airways (Pan Am) since early 1982, but the Civil Aeronautics Board (CAB) would not approve sale to Pan Am because it felt that Pan Am would have a monopoly over other American carriers in the region. Pan Am responded by offering to jointly lease the routes with Air Florida for three years at a price of US$30 million. Pan American chairman and former Braniff International President Ed Acker had previously served as chairman of Air Florida before taking the leadership position at Pan Am. The CAB decided that it would not change its position in spite of the joint-service application.

Braniff International maintained that it was hemorrhaging cash and that it could not continue to operate the money-losing South American system. The normally profitable South America system began losing money when fuel prices expanded in 1979 combined with a significant loss of critical feed at Braniff's US gateway cities, which made the legendary Douglas DC-8-62 four-engined, long-range jets uneconomical. Braniff entered into negotiations with Eastern Airlines to lease the routes to the Miami-based carrier for US$18 million effective June 1, 1982, for one year. On April 26, 1982, the CAB approved the Eastern/Braniff lease agreement in a 5–0 decision. Eastern Chairman Frank Borman reported that Eastern had paid Braniff an initial payment of US$11 million with the remaining $7 million to be paid at the end of 1982. Eastern initially offered to lease the routes for US$30 million for six years, but the CAB denied the request, stating that it was too long. Eastern had been trying unsuccessfully to obtain authority to fly to South America since 1938, and would operate 24 weekly flights from Miami, two from New York, and one from New Orleans to west coast South American cities that Braniff mainly served.

Under the agreement, Braniff International would retain service to Venezuela, and American Airlines would serve Braniff's Brazilian services as required by a bilateral treaty between the United States and Brazil. Approval from South American governments for Eastern's one-year lease of Braniff's routes would not be required according to United States officials. Braniff International lauded the CAB's quick decision, as the carrier had stated that because of its tenuous cash position that it might have to shut the routes down if an agreement were not approved. Braniff ceased operations on May 12–13, 1982, and Eastern took over the routes earlier than the planned June 1, 1982, commencement of service date.

Eastern Air Lines had reported losses for 1981 and felt that the purchase of Braniff's South America routes would help, but Eastern's financial condition worsened through the 1980s. Eastern never made a profit with their South American routes, due to the region's delicate financial situation at the time. On April 26, 1990, the United States Department of Transportation approved the sale of Eastern Airlines' Latin American routes to American Airlines for US$349 million. Eastern had recently filed for Chapter 11 bankruptcy protection and planned to use the money from the route sale to repay creditors and regain its financial footing. The funds were placed into a special fund controlled by Eastern's creditors, which had recently ousted controversial Chairman Frank Lorenzo, who had taken over the 60-year-old aviation legend in 1986.

=== Cessation of air carrier operations in 1982 ===
On May 11, 1982, Howard Putnam left a courtroom at the Federal Courthouse in Brooklyn, New York City, after failing to gain a court injunction to stop a threatened pilot strike (Braniff's pilot union maintains that they were not threatening a strike at this time). However, Putnam was successful in obtaining an extension of time from Braniff's principal creditors until October 1982. The next day, on May 12, Braniff Airways ceased air operations, ending 54 years of air service. Braniff flights at DFW that morning were suddenly grounded, and passengers were forced to disembark, being told that Braniff was no longer flying. A thunderstorm provided an excuse to cancel many afternoon flights that day, although Braniff's legendary Boeing 747 Flight 501 to Honolulu departed as scheduled, with the crew later refusing to divert the flight to Los Angeles International Airport. The flight returned to DFW the following morning, the last scheduled Braniff flight.

In the following days, Braniff jets at DFW sat idle on the apron by Terminal 2W. The Douglas DC-8-62 fleet was flown from Miami to Dallas Love Field and stored until new owners could be found.

Though all of Braniff's scheduled and nonscheduled airline operations ceased, all of the company's subsidiaries continued in operation, some for many years and still today. Braniff's maintenance activities at Love Field continued to serve its non-Braniff customers and oversaw the maintenance of Braniff's grounded fleet at DFW and Love Field. Braniff also continued to operate its Council Rooms, which were VIP passenger lounges, at certain airports, including DFW, which were contracted for use by other airlines that operated in Braniff's terminal facilities. Braniff Realty, Inc., continued to operate the airline's airport facilities, including Braniff's Terminal of the Future at Love Field, until it was sold to American Airlines in 1996. Braniff Realty also owned several of Braniff's Boeing 727-200 Trijet airliners, which were later sold as a result of the reorganization of the company in 1983.

Braniff Educations Systems, Inc., met for classes as scheduled on the morning of May 13, 1982, and during the reorganization was sold to Frontier Airlines, Inc., and operated as Braniff Education Systems, Inc., d/b/a Frontier Services, Inc. In 1985, the company was sold to a private individual in Texas, who operated the entity as Braniff Education Systems, Inc., d/b/a IATA or International Aviation and Travel Academy, which provided initial pilot training, airline simulator training, maintenance technician training, and airline-ticket and travel-agent training. IATA survived until 2007.

Braniff International Hotels, Inc., also continued in operation, which primarily operated the world famous Driskill Hotel in Austin, Texas. At one time, Braniff Hotels operated properties throughout the United States and Latin America. Braniff had saved the historic Driskill from demolition in 1973 and purchased the entity outright in February 1975. The assets of Braniff Hotels were transferred to the new Dalfort Corporation, which was the reorganized company created from Braniff Airways, Incorporated, and Braniff International Corporation, which was financed by the Hyatt Corporation. Eventually, the Driskill was sold to the Lincoln Hotel Corporation in 1985. Braniff International Hotels, Inc., still continues in operation today and manages, partners, licenses and/or owns 19 hotels in Latin America, Mexico and the United States.

With an approved bankruptcy reorganization agreement with Hyatt Corporation, a new Braniff, Inc., would be created from the assets of Braniff Airways, Incorporated. and Braniff International Corporation and would begin operations on March 1, 1984. Howard Putnam stepped down as president of the company with the announcement of the agreement, and longtime Braniff International Senior Vice President of Flight Operations Dale R. States became president of the company until the reorganization into Dalfort Corporation was completed on December 15, 1983.

The original airline company continues today as a retail, licensing and branding, travel and hotelier firm. Braniff is one of only two heritage airlines that continues to control its own intellectual property and other assets, with Pan Am being the other. Braniff Place World Headquarters, which the carrier occupied until December 15, 1983, on the west side of DFW, eventually became GTE Place, and then Verizon Place.

=== Successor organizations ===
Former Braniff employees founded Minnesota-based Sun Country Airlines in 1983. It operated a fleet of Boeing 727-200s and McDonnell Douglas DC-10s until 2001, when it filed for bankruptcy. Sun Country then reorganized and currently flies a modern fleet of Boeing 737-800s.

Fort Worth Airlines was founded in 1984 by Thomas B. King, a former Braniff vice president; two-thirds of the airline's executives came from Braniff, and even its office furniture was Braniff surplus bought at the airline's bankruptcy liquidation sale. Fort Worth Airlines used 56-seat NAMC YS-11 aircraft and flew to destinations in Oklahoma and Texas, but was unable to operate profitably, ceasing flights and filing for bankruptcy in 1985.

Two airlines were formed from the assets of Braniff:

- Braniff, Inc, was founded in 1983 by the Hyatt Corporation under the umbrella corporation Dalfort. The airline adopted a low-fare business model in 1984, only to collapse in late 1989, a victim of intense fare competition and mounting debts amid a general industry downturn.
- Braniff International Airlines, Inc., was founded in 1991 by financier Jeffrey Chodorow, whose company BNAir, Inc. purchased the assets of the moribund Braniff, Inc. Plagued by intense competition and by turmoil and malfeasance in its own upper management, the reborn airline dissolved in 1992.

== Braniff today ==
In early 2015, the private irrevocable trust that owned and administered Braniff's intellectual property and certain other company assets since 1983 released the assets to a private entity connected to the private trust, which founded a series of new Braniff companies that were incorporated in the State of Oklahoma, for historical purposes and for administration of the Braniff trademarks, copyrights, and other intellectual property. These companies included Braniff Air Lines, Inc., Paul R. Braniff, Inc., Braniff Airways, Incorporated, Braniff International Hotels, Inc., and Braniff International Corporation. During 2017 and 2018, some of the original Braniff companies were reinstated for historical purposes and administration of Braniff's intellectual property assets including those of Mid-Continent Airlines, Pan American Grace Airways, Florida Express Airlines and Long and Harman Airlines. However, in early 2022, the private trust reacquired these assets along with the original Braniff company and corresponding assets that it had previously owned.

The trademarks, copyrights, and other intellectual property of Braniff Airways, Incorporated, Braniff International Corporation and Braniff, Inc., Mid-Continent Airlines, Inc., and Panagra Pan American Grace Airways, Florida Express Airlines and Long and Harman Airlines, Inc., are currently owned by Braniff Airways, Incorporated, of the Braniff Building, 324 North Robinson Avenue, Suite 100, Oklahoma City, Oklahoma.

Braniff's midcentury-themed travel posters, produced from 1946 to 1964, that depict travel scenes from destinations in Latin America and the U.S. mainland were produced in Lima, Peru, by Braniff's advertising agency. These posters are therefore not placed in the public domain, but have instead undergone copyright restoration in the United States. In addition, all of these posters have been marked as official common-law trademarks of Braniff Airways, Incorporated, and they continue as a company trademark infinitely. Richard B. Cass serves as current chairman and CEO of the Braniff companies and in May 2020, was elected as the Chairman of the private irrevocable trust that owns those companies.

== Fleet ==
Braniff featured one of the youngest and most modern fleets in the industry. A planned retirement of older aircraft in tandem with the addition of roughly eight to ten new jets per year was followed throughout the 1970s, but at the same time, the company retired four to six older jets each year.

Braniff International operated the following aircraft types during its existence:

Braniff International fleet
Aircraft	Total	Introduced	Retired	Notes
Concorde	10	1979	1980	These aircraft were actually owned by Air France and British Airways. Leased and operated by Braniff crews subsonically between Dallas and Washington-Dulles as part of an interchange agreement for service between Texas and Europe.
BAC One-Eleven Series 200	14	1965	1972	Fleet was retired in 1972, but one aircraft was converted for executive charter work until 1977
Boeing 707-138B	4	1969	1973	Purchased, then sold and leased back
Boeing 707-227	5	1959	1971	Only four were delivered, N7071 crashed during predelivery flight at Oso, Washington, October 1959
Boeing 707-327C	9	1966	1973	
Boeing 720	9	1961	1973	Includes Series -027, 2 Series -048, and 1 Series -022
Boeing 727-100	46	1966	1982	Original order included "Quick Change" (QC) combi aircraft for transporting both passengers and freight on main deck
Boeing 727-200	79	1970	1982	
Boeing 747-100	4	1971	1982	
Boeing 747-200B	4	1978	1982	
Boeing 747-200C	1	1979	1981	Leased from World Airways
Boeing 747SP	3	1979	1982	
Convair CV-240	4	1952	1953	
Convair CV-340	26	1952	1967	Some orders were later taken up by Ansett Airways. Two aircraft were retained for maintenance parts runners until 1969.
Convair CV-440	6	1956	1966	
Curtiss C-46 Commando	2	1955	1963	
Douglas C-54 Skymaster; Douglas DC-4	10	1945	1954	Five Model A and five Model B
Douglas DC-2	7	1937	1942	
Douglas DC-3	46	1939	1960	
Douglas DC-6	11	1947	1965	Nine DC-6, 1 DC-6A and 1 DC-6B
Douglas DC-7C	7	1956	1966	
Douglas DC-8-31	4	1967	1967	
Douglas DC-8-51	6	1973	1980	
Douglas DC-8-55CF	1	1967	1967	Leased from Douglas Aircraft Company
Douglas DC-8-62	10	1967	1982	
Fairchild 71	5	1929	1930	
Fokker F-10A	1	1929	1930	
Hamilton H-47	4	1929	1930	
Lockheed Model 10 Electra	7	1935	1940	Used in war service 1940
Lockheed L-049 Constellation	2	1955	1959	Sold in 1960 and 1961
Lockheed L-188A Electra	11	1959	1969	Includes 1 Model C, only mainline turboprop aircraft type operated by the airline Fleet sold March 1968, but leased back until April 1969
Lockheed Vega	12	1930	1937	
Mohawk Pinto	1	1929	1930	
Stinson Detroiter	2	1928	1929	
Alexander Eagle Rock Longwing	1	1928	1929	
Ryan B-1 Brougham	1	1928	1929	
Travel Air 2000	2	1928	1929	
Travel Air 4000D	1	1928	1929	
Travel Air A6000-A	1	1928	1929	
Travel Air S6000-B	1	1929	1930	Formerly with Paul R. Braniff, Inc., as A6000-A model

== Incidents and accidents ==
- July 12, 1931 – A Braniff Lockheed DL-1B Vega (NC8497) crashed shortly after takeoff from Chicago Airport, killing both pilots.
- December 8, 1934 – A Braniff Lockheed Vega 5C aircraft, registration NC106W, crashed into a road embankment around 5:20 am near Columbia, Missouri, killing the pilot and destroying the aircraft. The service was a mail flight between Kansas City and Columbia. The Bureau of Air Commerce investigation report stated the likely cause was "unexpected icing conditions which made the proper handling of the aircraft impossible".
- December 23, 1936 – A Braniff Lockheed Model 10 Electra airliner, registration NC14905, suffered an engine failure during a go-around while conducting an unscheduled test flight at Dallas Love Field, Dallas, Texas; the pilot tried to turn back towards the airfield, but lost control, causing the craft to spin into the northern shore of Bachman Lake. The six occupants of the Electra, all Braniff employees, died in the crash and ensuing fire.
- March 26, 1939 – Braniff Flight 1, operating from Chicago to Brownsville, Texas, crashed on takeoff from Oklahoma City Municipal Air Terminal, today known as Will Rogers World Airport. Early that March morning, the aircraft, a Douglas DC-2, registration NC13727, suffered an explosion in the left engine that in turn caused the engine's cowling to open up, creating serious drag on the left wing. The flight's captain, Claude Seaton, struggled to keep the aircraft stable while turning back for an emergency landing at Oklahoma City. The aircraft's compromised wing hit an embankment on the section line road forming the airport's western boundary and cartwheeled across the ground. Seaton ordered the aircraft's fuel to be cut off, but in vain, as when the plane came to rest on the ground, fuel came in contact with the still-hot engines and caught fire. Seaton and First Officer Malcolm Wallace were thrown free on impact and survived with serious injuries, which ended the flying career of the captain. Flight attendant Louise Zarr and seven passengers died in the postcrash fire.
- March 26, 1952 – Braniff Flight 65, a Douglas C-54A (N65143), ran off the runway at HAP Airport in Hugoton, Kansas, during an emergency landing following an unexplained fire in the number-three engine. All 49 on board survived.
- May 15, 1953 – A Braniff Douglas DC-4 carrying 48 passengers and five crew slid off the end of Runway 36 at Dallas Love Field, crossed Lemmon Avenue, and plowed into an embankment. Despite reportedly heavy automobile traffic on the busy street, no vehicles were struck, and nobody aboard the airliner was seriously injured. The crash was attributed to poor braking action on the rain-slicked runway.
- August 22, 1954 – Braniff Flight 152 crashed 16 mi south of Mason City, Iowa, after encountering windshear in a thunderstorm, killing 12 of 19 on board. The aircraft was a Douglas C-47, registration N61451.
- July 17, 1955 – Braniff Flight 560 crashed at Chicago–Midway Airport after the pilot became disoriented during the approach, killing 22 of 43 on board. The aircraft was a Convair CV-340-22, registration N3422.
- March 25, 1958 – Braniff Flight 971 crashed near Miami International Airport while attempting to return to the airport after the number-three engine caught fire, killing nine of 15 passengers; all five crew survived. The pilot had become preoccupied with the engine fire and failed to maintain altitude. The aircraft was a Douglas DC-7C, registration N5904.
- September 29, 1959 – Braniff Flight 542 crashed in Buffalo, Texas, while en route from Houston to Dallas, and the crash resulted in the deaths of 29 passengers and five crew members. The plane, registration number N9705C, was an 11-day-old Lockheed L-188 Electra. The Civil Aeronautics Board blamed the crash on metal fatigue due to the "whirl-mode" propeller theory. In 2022, Braniff Airways sponsored a Texas State Historical Marker, which was placed at the accident site in Buffalo, Texas.
- October 19, 1959 – A Boeing 707 crashed near Arlington, Washington. The new jet aircraft, registered as N7071, was due for delivery to Braniff the next day and was already wearing Braniff livery. The aircraft was on an orientation flight with Boeing and Braniff personnel. A Boeing pilot initiated a series of Dutch rolls, with a Braniff pilot performing recoveries. Rolls exceeded maximum bank angle restrictions, resulting in a loss of control. The aircraft recovered, but three engines were torn off and the 707 crashed while attempting an emergency landing northeast of Arlington. The four crew members in the cockpit were killed, while four observers located in the tail survived.
- September 14, 1960 – An airline maintenance inspector lost control of a Braniff International Airways Douglas DC-7C during a taxi test and crashed into the Braniff Operations and Maintenance Base hangar at high speed. The inspector died and five of the six mechanics aboard were injured. The aircraft brakes were set to bypass mode and braking action was not available when it was needed.
- November 14, 1961 – A Braniff DC-7C (N5905) was written off following a ground fire caused by a lit cigar from a cleaning crew member at Dallas Love Field.
- August 6, 1966 – Braniff Flight 250 crashed near Falls City, Nebraska, en route from Kansas City to Omaha after encountering severe thunderstorms in flight. Thirty-eight passengers and four crew members were killed in the crash. The plane was a BAC One-Eleven 203, registration N1553.
- May 3, 1968 – Braniff Flight 352 crashed in Dawson, Texas, while en route to Dallas from Houston, killing 80 passengers and five crew members. The plane was a Lockheed Electra II, registration N9707C. The crash was caused by the pilot's decision to enter an area of severe thunderstorms, and the aircraft suffered stresses beyond its design limits and broke apart. In 2023, Braniff Airways Foundation sponsored a Texas State Historical Marker, was placed at the accident site in Dawson, Texas.
- July 2, 1971 – Braniff Flight 14, a Boeing 707 flying from Acapulco to New York City with 102 passengers and a crew of eight was hijacked on approach to a refueling stop in San Antonio, Texas. After a refueling stop in Monterrey, the hijackers released flight attendants Jeanette Eatman Crepps, Iris Kay Williams, and Anita Bankert Mayer and all of the passengers. The remaining crew of Captain Dale Bessant, Bill Wallace, Phillip Wray, and flight attendants Ernestina Garcia and Margaret Susan Harris flew on to Lima. The hijackers, a U.S. Navy deserter named Robert Jackson and his female Guatemalan companion, demanded and received ransom of $100,000 and wanted to go to Algeria. The Bessant crew was released, one by one, and replaced by a volunteer crew of Captain Al Schroeder, Bill Mizell, Bob Williams, and Navigator Ken McWhorter. Two Lima-based employees, Delia Arizola and Clorinda Ortoneda, volunteered to board the flight. Arizola had been retired six months, but still offered her services. The 707 left for Rio and planned to refuel, but the hijackers forced them on to Buenos Aires. The long flight and fatigue took its toll and the hijackers gave up. The incident was a record for long-distance hijacking, over 7,500 miles (12,100 km), and lasted 43 hours.
- January 12, 1972 – Braniff Flight 38, a Boeing 727, was hijacked as it departed Houston bound for Dallas. The lone armed hijacker, Billy Gene Hurst Jr., allowed all 94 passengers to deplane after landing at Dallas Love Field, but continued to hold the seven crew members hostage, demanding to fly to South America and asking for US$2 million, parachutes, and jungle survival gear, among other items. After a six-hour standoff, the entire crew secretly fled while Hurst was distracted examining the contents of a package delivered by Dallas police. Police officers stormed the craft shortly afterwards and arrested Hurst without serious incident.
- August 23, 1977 — A package of cocaine for American country music singer Waylon Jennings, was delivered on Braniff Flight 119. It was intercepted by the Drug Enforcement Administration prior to its departure from John F. Kennedy International Airport in New York City. Jennings and his associates were briefly arrested, but ultimately never faced serious jail time besides Mark Rothbaum who served an 18-month sentence for the incident.
- November 9, 1979 – A Braniff Boeing 747 was ordered by Philippine authorities to land at Manila International Airport on suspicion of violating Philippine airspace. The aircraft was held up in Manila for approximately three hours.

== Bibliography ==
- Cass, Richard (2015). Braniff Airways:Flying Colors. Mount Pleasant (SC): Arcadia Publishing.
- Wigton, D.C. (1963). From Jenny to jet. Los Angeles (CA.): Floyd Clymer Publications.
- Cearley, G.W. jr. (1980). Braniff : With a dash of colors and a touch of elegance. Dallas (TX): Airline Historical Publications.
- Nance, John J. (1984). Splash of colors: the self-destruction of Braniff International. New York: Morrow.
- Cearley, G.W. jr. (1986). Braniff International Airways-The building of a maior international airline. Dallas (TX): Airline Historical Publications.
- Cearley, G.W. jr. (1993). Braniff International Airways in color. Dallas (TX): Airline Historical Publications.
- Szurovy, G. (2000). Classic American airlines. St. Paul (MN): Motorbooks International/MBI Publishing Co.

== See also ==
- List of defunct airlines of the United States
