= Mohawk M-1-C =

M1C
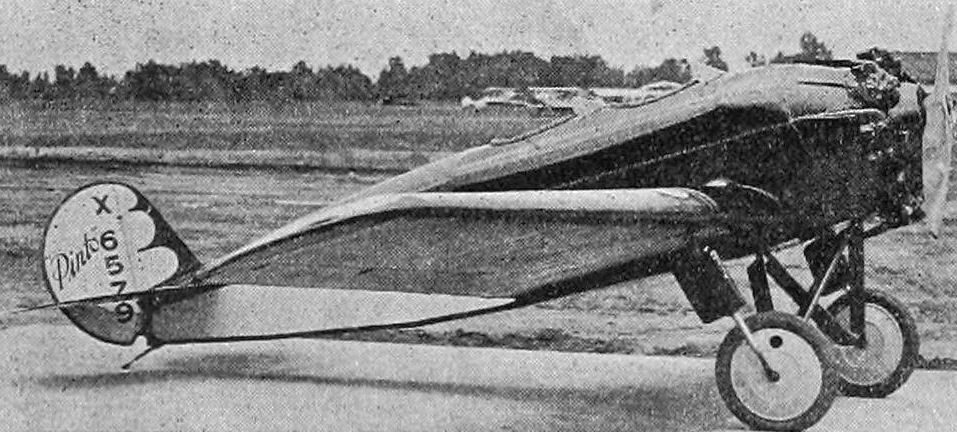

General information
- Type: Training monoplane
- National origin: United States
- Manufacturer: Mohawk Aircraft Corporation
- Number built: 7

History
- First flight: 1929

The Mohawk M1C (variously named Pinto, Redskin or Spurwing) was a 1920s American two or three-seat low-wing monoplane designed and built by Mohawk Aero Corporation of Minneapolis, Minnesota. One M1C was evaluated by the United States Army Air Corps in 1930 as the YPT-7 Pinto for use as a primary trainer.

== Design and development ==
The M1C was a three-seat low-wing cantilever monoplane which was available with an open cockpit (as the Pinto) and enclosed cockpit (as the Redskin). The first variant was the M1C-K powered by a 100 hp (75 kW) Kinner K-5 or a 100 hp (75 kW) Wright engine. One aircraft was modified for evaluation by the United States Army Air Corps as the YPT-7 Pinto.

A two-seat variant the M1C-W was also produced with a 110 hp (82 kW) Warner Scarab engine. The first one was the aircraft evaluated by the Army and re-engined. In 1930 the company went bankrupt and was taken over by the R R Rand Jr.

== Variants ==
M1C-K
Kinner K-5 powered variant, five built.
M1C-W
Warner Scarab powered variant, one modified from M1C-K and two more built.
YPT-7
United States Army Air Corps designation for one M1C-K for evaluation in 1930 the Kinner K-5 engine given the military designation YR-370-1.

== Specifications (M1C-K) ==
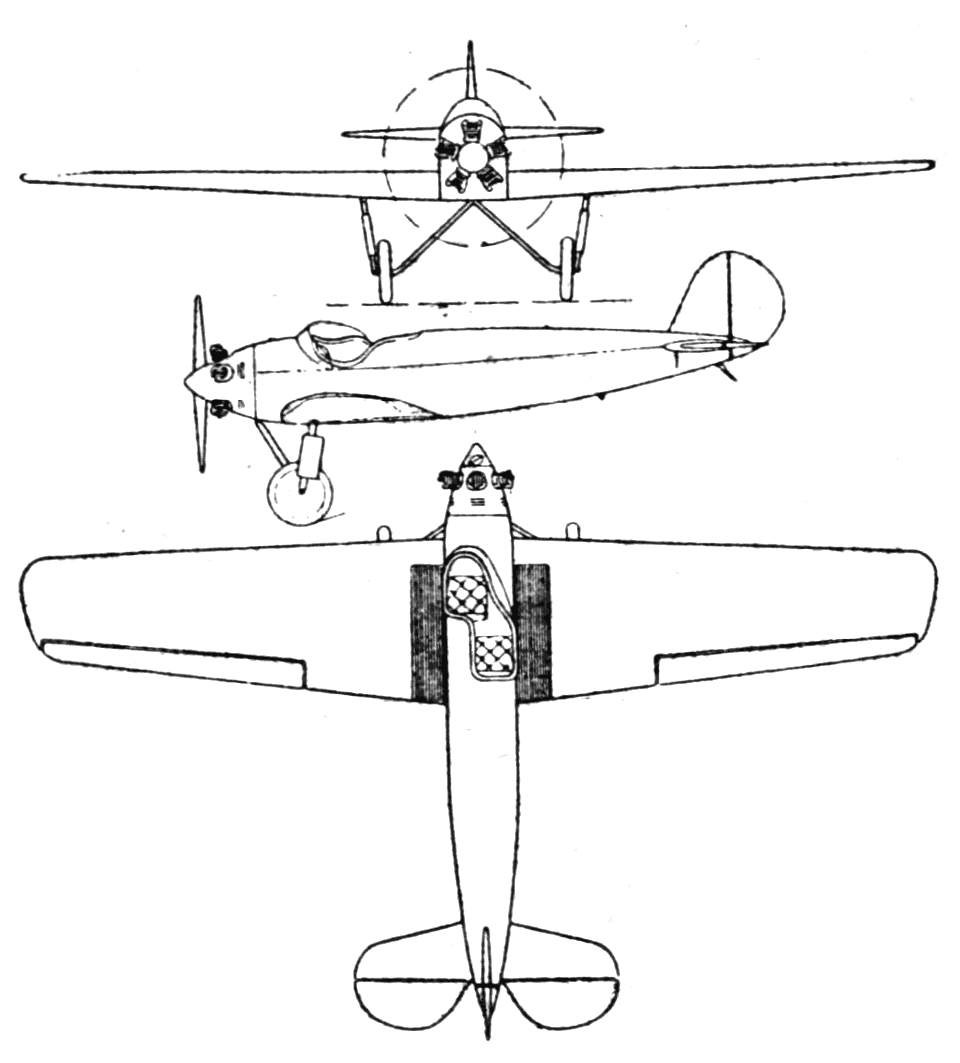
Mohawk Pinto 3-view drawing from Le Document aéronautique April,1928

Data from Specifications of American Commercial Airplanes

General characteristics

- Crew: 1
- Capacity: 1 passenger
- Length: 24 ft 2 in (7.37 m)
- Wingspan: 34 ft 11 in (10.64 m)
- Height: 7 ft 7 in (2.31 m)
- Wing area: 145 sq ft (13.5 m^{2})
- Empty weight: 1,125 lb (510 kg)
- Gross weight: 1,800 lb (816 kg)
- Powerplant: 1 × Kinner K-5 , 90 hp (67 kW)

Performance

- Maximum speed: 115 mph (185 km/h, 100 kn)
- Cruise speed: 95 mph (153 km/h, 83 kn)
- Range: 550 mi (890 km, 480 nmi)
- Service ceiling: 18,000 ft (5,500 m)
- Rate of climb: 1,100 ft/min (5.6 m/s)

== See also ==
Related lists

- List of military aircraft of the United States
