= Paul Braniff =

Paul Braniff may refer to:

- Paul Revere Braniff (1897–1954), American airline entrepreneur
- Paul Braniff (hurler) (born 1982), Irish hurler
