= Paul Revere Braniff =

American entrepreneur (1897–1954)

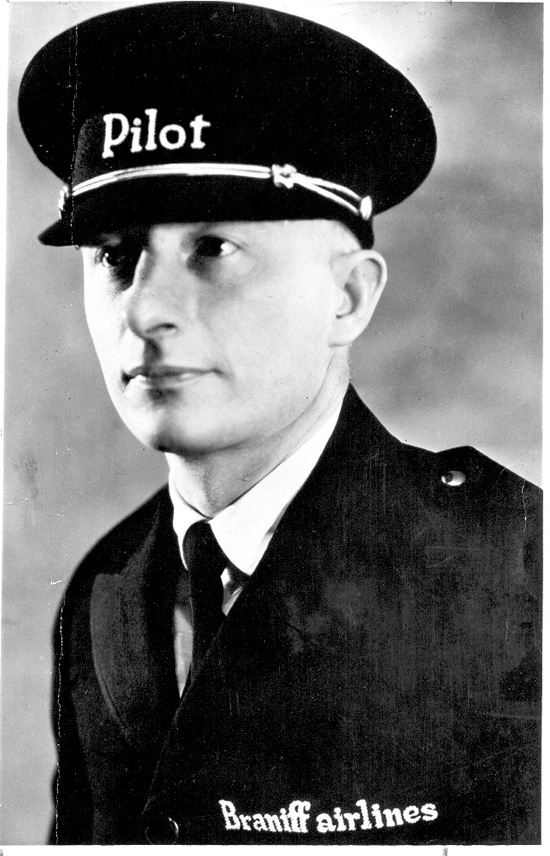
Braniff in 1929

Paul Revere Braniff (August 30, 1897 – June 1, 1954 (Note: tombstone incorrectly states June 15, 1954)) was an American entrepreneur. He was a co-founder of Braniff International Airways with his brother Thomas Elmer Braniff. He served as a mechanic in World War I in the United States Army and then as a pilot in World War II.

== Early years and family ==
Paul Revere Braniff was born in Kansas City, Kansas. He grew up during the early era of aviation, and, as a youngster, became fascinated with the new way of transport. His family moved to Oklahoma City, Oklahoma, in 1900.

=== Marriage ===
Braniff married Marie Agnes Maney on April 29, 1920.

Marie Agnes Maney was born on May 2, 1898, in El Reno, Oklahoma. She was the daughter of James W. Maney, who was an Oklahoma Territory Pioneer. He built thousands of miles of railroads throughout the Western United States. His occupation was Civil Engineer and was President of the Clinton and Western Oklahoma Railroad and founded a chain of grain elevators in the Enid, Oklahoma, area. Marie Maney grew up at Maney House in Oklahoma City, Oklahoma, that is now a historically protected property. She attended and graduated from schools in Baltimore, Maryland.

Marie Braniff was highly interested in her husband's work. When he founded Paul R. Braniff, Inc. and then its successor Braniff Airways, Inc., she traveled with him scouting new routes. Her love for Paul and his aviation interests led her to compile a very detailed archive on the history of Braniff Airways. She remained highly interested and involved in the preservation of Braniff history even after Paul Braniff's death in 1954.

They had one child, John Paul Braniff, who was born on October 29, 1927. John Braniff died in Oklahoma City, Oklahoma, on February 1, 2013, at the age of 85.

== Military service ==
Braniff joined the United States Army during World War I as a mechanic and private on July 6, 1917. He went to France, becoming a corporal, then a temporary sergeant. In France, he learned to shoot, becoming an avid gunman, although he never used this ability outside of the military.

== Oklahoma Aero Club and Paul R. Braniff, Inc. ==
After being honorably discharged from the Army, Paul Braniff joined his brother Tom in an insurance company that carried the family's name. Paul Braniff, however, kept dreaming about aviation all along and received his pilot's license in 1917. He obtained Transport License Number 690 from Orville Wright. In 1924, he was bought his own aircraft.

Braniff founded his own flying company soon after, eventually helping convince Tom Braniff and other investors to bring money and form the Oklahoma Aero Club, in 1927. Reserved for use of the six investors, the company was registered as the Paul R. Braniff, Inc., thus marking the first birth of Braniff Airways. Paul Braniff flew the company's first flight on June 20, 1928, from Oklahoma City to Tulsa, Oklahoma in a 5-passenger single engine Stinson Detroiter aircraft. Records indicate that there were flights between the two cities prior to the June 20 date. However, company records began recording flights on that date.

Charles Lindbergh's monumental 1927 Atlantic crossing sparked massive interest in aviation around the nation. In Oklahoma, the interest was manifested in the Oklahoma Air Tour of 1928. Sponsored by the Chamber of Commerce of Oklahoma, it involved aviators flying to various Oklahoma town expressing an interest in aviation. The five-day tour, departing Oklahoma City on May 14, 1928, flew eighteen thousand cumulative miles and stopped at eighteen towns. An estimated 100,000 people turned out to view the twenty two aircraft and hear the pilots, including Braniff, promote the benefits of commercial aviation. The Oklahoma cities of Altus, Miami, and Guthrie, built airports specifically for air tour usage. The tour was operated again in 1929, but the onslaught of the Great Depression ended any further air races.

At the time, the airline was involved with the National Transcontinental air race.

In November 1929, Paul R. Braniff, Inc. was purchased by Universal Airlines, was renamed as Braniff Airlines, and moved headquarters to St. Louis.

== In Mexico ==
In 1929, Braniff left the United States to go to Mexico to help someone build a struggling Mexican airline company (apparently this person was Alberto Braniff, but no evidence of this, nor of Alberto Braniff being related to the American Braniff brothers, has ever been reported).

Braniff remained in Mexico until 1930.

== Braniff Airways, Inc. ==
While in Mexico, Braniff gained airline industry expertise. He returned to the United States with innovative ideas for a new Braniff airline, including the use of faster aircraft that he knew would help the airline by bringing quicker turn-around times and, as a consequence, enable the airline to carry more passengers.

With that idea, Paul R. Braniff convinced Tom Braniff and the other four investors to buy two Lockheed Vega aircraft. Braniff Airways, Inc. was formed in November, 1930.

Paul R. Braniff headed to Washington, D.C. in 1934, being called to testify before the congress, which was heading an investigation against air mail services. He returned to St. Louis with a contract for Braniff Airlines to carry mail, the first time the airline had obtained an airmail contract.

Braniff then set on exploring new markets for the company that bore his last name. In 1936, Braniff headed to Brazil, and he returned to St. Louis convinced that the company would do great economically if established in South America. The carrier was awarded a 7719-mile route from the Mainland US to far South America in 1946 with service beginning in 1948. Braniff Airways, Inc. began doing business as Braniff International Airways with the beginning of South America service.

Braniff had been running the day-to-day operations of the airline but decided to leave the carrier in 1935. He was replaced by Charles Edmund Beard who would eventually become the President of Braniff Airways in 1954.

Intending to retire from aviation, Paul Braniff sold the airline to his brother Tom. It was after he left that Braniff International Airways became a major player in United States-South America travel and vice versa, as Braniff International Airways began daily flights to various points in that continent and to Europe after the jet era began, with their distinctive livery that included many colors not seen before on aircraft fuselages.

== Braniff Engineering Corporation ==
Braniff went to Oklahoma to try to work as a mechanic, and he established the Braniff Engineering Corporation. That company was the first one to introduce the Lennox Air Conditioners and heating systems in Oklahoma.

== World War II ==
At 44 years old, Braniff was re-called into military service as the United States entered World War II, in 1941. He flew aircraft in the United States Army Air Forces. He flew with the IX Troop Carrier Command in England. But, after his second service in the military was over, so was his flying career.

== Later years and death ==
Braniff later worked as an advisor for the Douglas Company in Los Angeles. He moved to Oklahoma, where he worked for another aviation-related company as salesman, selling used aircraft parts.

Braniff was diagnosed with cancer later in his life, and he went on to spend his last couple of years relatively inactive. Expected to survive his cancer, Braniff suffered a cold in the summer of 1954, which later turned into a pneumonia. He underwent surgery to correct the pneumonia, but the surgery aggravated the cancer. He died on June 1, 1954, from complications of cancer that his doctors stated was directly connected with pneumonia and resulting surgery. Braniff was 56. Braniff's tombstone at his burial site incorrectly states he died on June 15, 1954.
