= Thomas Elmer Braniff =

American businessman (1883–1954)

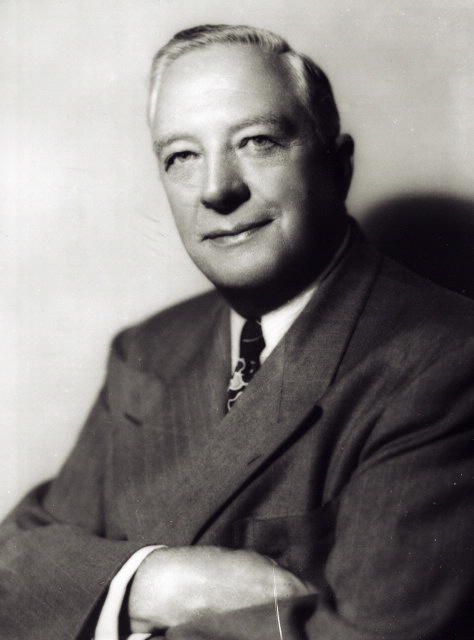
- Braniff in 1950
- Born: Thomas Elmer Braniff; December 6, 1883; Salina, Kansas, U.S.
- Died: January 10, 1954 (aged 70); Near Shreveport, Louisiana, U.S.
- Occupation: Entrepreneur
- Known for: Co-founder of Braniff International Airways

Thomas Elmer Braniff (December 6, 1883 – January 10, 1954) was an American entrepreneur. He was a co-founder of Braniff International Airways, along with his brother Paul Revere Braniff. Known as Tom Braniff, he was also a noted insurance pioneer in Oklahoma. In 1928 he formed Paul R. Braniff, Inc., with his brother Paul Braniff, to operate schedule air carrier flights between Oklahoma City and Tulsa, Oklahoma.

== Early years and family ==
Thomas Elmer Braniff was born on December 6, 1883, in Salina, Kansas. He was the oldest of six children that included his younger brother Paul, as well as two other brothers and two sisters. His parents were John A. Braniff (father) and Mary Catherine Baker Braniff (mother). His father was an early pioneer settler in Kansas having moved to the region from the Altoona, Pennsylvania area where he was a farmer. Tom's family was of Irish ancestry, with his grandfather Patrick Braniff, having migrated to the United States from Ireland in approximately 1800.

Tom Braniff's family moved from Salina to Kansas City, Kansas, in the mid-1890s. Tom attended high school at Kansas City High School and worked for Armour and Company, which was a meat packing entity. He also worked as a copy boy at the Kansas City Star newspaper. In 1900, the family moved to the new Oklahoma Territory. Tom's father, John, had also worked in the insurance industry and Tom joined his father in the business at Oklahoma City. Thomas Elmer Braniff was not to remain in his father's insurance business for long choosing instead to create his own agency. However, due to age restrictions for opening an agency in Oklahoma City, Tom had to look outside the area to form his agency. He went to Bridgeport, Oklahoma, and opened his agency. Bridgeport was twenty five miles to the West of Oklahoma City.

From this agency Tom sold fire and tornado insurance. Oklahoma, known for its violent tornadoes, spawned a twister that wiped out the fledgling agency as well as the insurance company that had to pay the claims. The tornado hit the Bridgeport settlement late at night destroying much of the town. Young Tom had sold many policies, door to door, to the settlers. The claims were too numerous for the agency or the insurance company to survive and Tom Braniff had to start over. Tom used the earnings from his new business to pay off the claims from the Bridgeport tornado that had not already been settled.

At the age of 18 in 1901, Tom returned to his home of Oklahoma City and founded a partnership with Frank Merrill. Merrill was a 40-year-old traveling salesman and the two elected to sell farm insurance. The two unlikely partners formed the Merrill and Braniff Agency. Their first-year earnings netted them US$400 each, which was barely enough to keep the agency in business.

On October 26, 1912, he married Bess Thurman. They had two children; a son, Thurman Braniff, and a daughter Jeanne Braniff. Thurman was killed in a training aircraft crash at Oklahoma City in 1938 and Jeanne Braniff died while giving childbirth ten years later in 1948.

== Insurance pioneer ==
Tom Braniff bought out Merrill in 1917 and renamed the firm T.E. Braniff Insurance Company. In 1924, he created Braniff Investment, Co., by buying out a partner in a loan firm. By this point Braniff had created one of the most successful insurance firms in the Southwest and was well known for a creative plan that involved using surety bonds to guarantee first-mortgage debt.

In 1922, Thomas Elmer Braniff, began building the first skyscraper in Oklahoma City. Named The Braniff Building, it housed Braniff's business entities and served as the main company headquarters beginning on July 1, 1923. Braniff continued on to found Prudential Fire Insurance Company in 1928 and then in 1929, Kansas City Fire Insurance Company.

== Aviation pioneer ==
In 1927, Tom Braniff joined forces with several investors and created Oklahoma Aero Club. They purchased a used aircraft and operated a flight school, aircraft dealership, parts distributor and air taxi operator. Tom Braniff bought out all of his partners and joined with his brother Paul Revere Braniff to form Paul R. Braniff, Inc. The new Braniff Airlines operated scheduled air carrier flights between Oklahoma City and Tulsa, Oklahoma, a distance of 116 miles. Paul Braniff acted as president of the new company, with Tom as vice-president. In 1929, Paul R. Braniff, Inc. was sold to Universal Aviation Corporation to form a group of companies to operate transcontinental airmail network.

Braniff Airlines, Inc. was formed with Paul Braniff as executive vice president. Tom Braniff was no long a part of this new Braniff operation. The company was eventually shut down by AVCO or Aviation Corporation of America after they purchased Braniff's holding company Universal even though Braniff flew the most passengers of all divisions.

In 1930, Tom Braniff and his brother Paul founded a new airline. It was incorporated as Braniff Airways, Inc. and began operations from Oklahoma City to Tulsa and Oklahoma City to Wichita Falls, Texas, using Lockheed Vega aircraft.

Tom Braniff knew that investment in any aviation entity was a risky proposition and felt that trying to raise capital to grow Braniff with should be presented to investors who could not be financially ruined if the aviation venture were to fail. Braniff was very aware of the plight of his fellow man and the need to protect a single person from personal ruin. As a result of this belief he created what was called the B Line Club. Braniff was in need of capital to finance new aircraft to service the new routes that were awarded by the CAB and Tom Braniff felt that because of the 1938 Act that the risk of investment had been modified but was still evident.

In 1938, Braniff had initially looked for an investment banker in New York to help him with a public offering of his stock. However, he was not successful in garnering a banker to market his airline's shares but he did meet with one banker that would be interested if Braniff could prove that there was interest in his shares. As a result of this, Tom started the B Line Club in major cities and offered only 100 shares to each possible investor. He headed to Kansas City where he was well known in the insurance business and sold his first 100 share investment at US$27.50 per share to Frank Phillips, the founder of Phillips 66, and an original investor in the 1927 Oklahoma Aero Club.

Tom Braniff set up B Line Clubs in Oklahoma City, Dallas, Houston, San Antonio, Corpus Christi, and Austin. In a very brief period Braniff had procured 21 members in his moderate risk airline investment group in Kansas City alone. By the mid-1950s, one of the original shares in the B Line Club were, as a result of stock splits, equal to six shares. A successful public offering of Braniff stock was made, in 1938, as a result of the success of the B Line Club which clear showed that there was public interest in the shares of Braniff Airways. The offering was not made via a Wall Street banking firm but by a Washington DC banker by the name of Ferdinand Eberstadt.

Eberstadt was specialized in offering to the public shares of family owned corporations. Braniff and Eberstadt met and a deal was struck and the first offering was oversubscribed. A second larger and equally successful public offering was made several years later. Eberstadt became a Braniff Airways Board Member and was on the board for over eleven years.

The innovation of Tom Braniff put Braniff on the map not only as a leader in air transportation but also in raising capital and minimizing investor risk.

Braniff Airways, Inc. d/b/a Braniff International Airways was the only US air carrier that retained the original owner's name throughout its entire history of operation.

== Honors ==
- Knight of Malta and a Knight of the Order of the Holy Sepulchre of the Catholic Church
- Granted the title of Knight Commander of the Order of St. Gregory the Great by Pope Pius XII, in 1944. This is the highest honor that can be bestowed on a layman.
- Honorary Degree, Southern Methodist University, Dallas, Texas
- Honorary Degree, Oklahoma City University, Oklahoma City, Oklahoma
- Aviation Man of the Year, 1952, University of Denver, Denver, Colorado

== Board memberships ==
- Founded the World Organization for Brotherhood, from which he later received the first American citation for his work.
- Catholic Cochairman of the National Conference of Christians and Jews from 1946 until 1954
- Chairman of the Transportation and Commerce Committee of the United States Inter-American Council on Commerce and Production
- Honorary member of Delta Phi Epsilon, foreign service fraternity

== Blakley Braniff Foundation ==
Texas Senator William A. Blakley, who in 1961 was appointed to then Senator Lyndon B. Johnson's seat after LBJ was elected Vice President of the United States, created the Blakley Braniff Foundation with Tom Braniff. Thomas Elmer Braniff created the Braniff Foundation in 1944 for the purpose of supporting educational, religious, scientific and research endeavors. It became the Blakley Braniff Foundation after Mr. Braniff's death in 1954. Senator Blakley was the largest shareholder of Braniff International Airways and donated US$100 million to the Blakley Braniff Foundation. In 1966, through a $7,500,000 grant from the foundation to the small private University of Dallas, the Braniff Graduate School of Liberal Arts which included the Braniff School of Management. This grant also made possible the construction of the Braniff Graduate Center Building as well as the Braniff Mall and Memorial Gardens as well as the iconic Braniff Memorial Tower. The Braniff Memorial Tower was dedicated to the memory of Thomas Elmer Braniff and his wife Bess Thurman Braniff.

== Death ==
On Sunday, January 10, 1954, Thomas Elmer Braniff was killed in a private plane crash in Louisiana. Tom Braniff, along with nine other noted businessmen from Texas and Louisiana, were on a duck hunting trip sponsored by United Gas Corporation. The hunting trip was conducted near Grand Chenier, Louisiana. The group was traveling aboard a Grumman Mallard twin-engine aircraft and encountered severe icing while on the return trip home from Grand Chenier. The pilot, Bobby Huddleston, who was employed by United Gas, tried desperately to save the aircraft but was unable to maintain altitude due to the fast-accumulating ice on the wings and fuselage. Huddleston radioed that he was going to try to make it to Shreveport, Louisiana, just across the Texas border in Northern Louisiana.

The flight was operating near sundown which made visibility even worse coupled with the icy conditions. A fast-moving cold front had pushed the icing conditions much further south than had been expected. The pilot instructed the co-pilot to radio Shreveport that they would try to land the aircraft at nearby Wallace Lake. The aircraft had accumulated too much ice to make Shreveport. At 5:50 PM the Grumman Mallard carrying Thomas Elmer Braniff crashed short of its intended emergency landing spot, into the wooden cabins of a fishing camp that was located on the north shore of Wallace Lake. Braniff and the other occupants, the pilot and copilot were killed instantly. Braniff was 70.

A large Mass was conducted at the Sacred Heart Cathedral in Dallas, Texas, at 10:00AM on January 13, 1954. Over 1100 people crowded into the cathedral to pay respects to the Braniff CEO. Braniff was interred at Calvary Hill Cemetery in Dallas, Texas. He was preceded in death by his only son, Thurman Braniff in 1938, and his only eldest daughter Jeanne Braniff Terrell in 1948. Thurman ironically died in a training airplane crash in Oklahoma City. Jeanne Braniff died during childbirth. Tom Braniff's death was quickly followed by that of his brother, Paul Revere Braniff, of bone cancer in June 1954. Tom Braniff's wife Bess Braniff died quietly in her sleep on August 23, 1954. She was buried next to her husband at Calvary Hill Cemetery.

== Probate of will ==
Thomas Elmer Braniff's Last Will and Testament was filed for probate in Dallas County Probate Court on January 16, 1954. In the will Braniff left Braniff stock to his wife and other family members. He left the remainder of his Braniff stock to key executives of Braniff Airways, with the remainder going to the Blakely Braniff Foundation. He also left special bequests to employees at the Braniff Building in Oklahoma City and E.E. Doggett of Oklahoma City, Oklahoma, who was in the insurance business with Braniff for over thirty years.
