= Harding Lawrence =

American businessman (1920–2002)

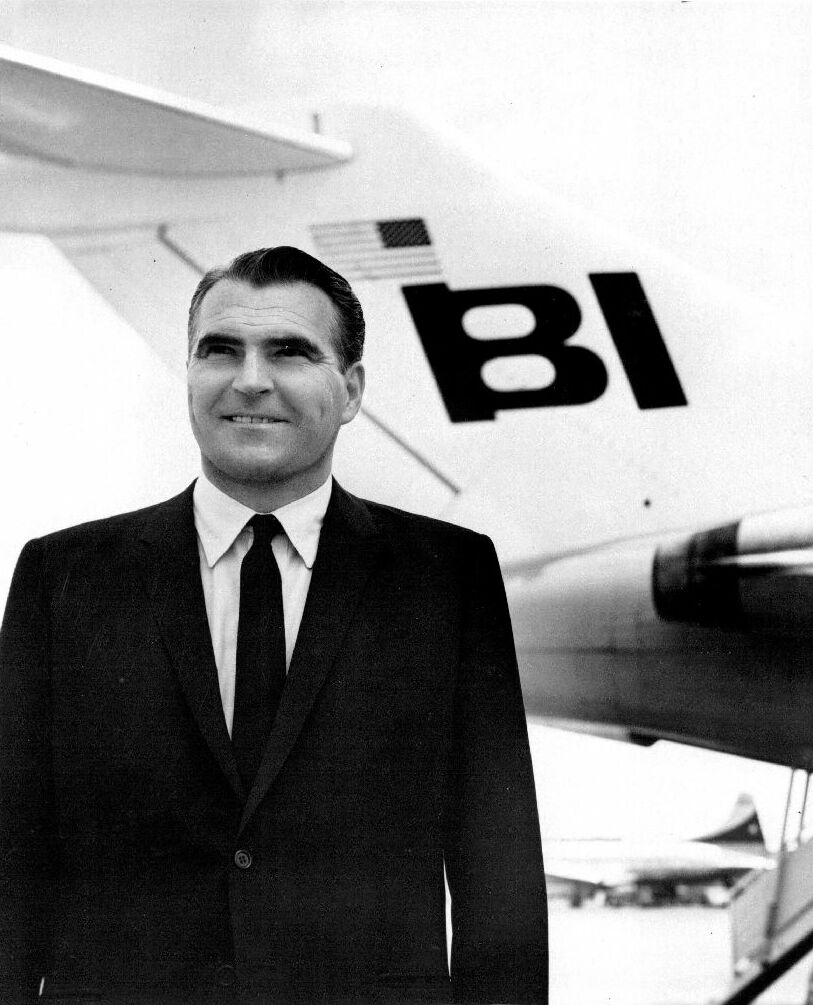
Lawrence in 1966, with one of the new Boeing 727s he introduced into the Braniff fleet.

Harding Luther Lawrence (July 15, 1920 – January 16, 2002) was executive vice president of Continental Airlines and then president and chairman of Braniff International Airways, a Dallas, Texas-based carrier. Lawrence's bold and dramatic accomplishments at both airlines earned him the reputation as not only a maverick of the transportation industry but as one of the last legendary titans of aviation. While at Braniff, Lawrence turned the conservative airline into a progressive and flamboyant carrier known for high fashion flight attendant uniforms, exemplary inflight service, and brightly painted planes. Lawrence' revolutionary approach included approving the "End of the Plain Plane" campaign in 1965, which called for imaginative aircraft paint schemes, interiors, and never before seen passenger service comforts. Previous airlines were commonly patterned after less than appealing military operations.

== Early years ==
He was born in Oklahoma and grew up in Gladewater, Texas. His father, Moncey Luther Lawrence (November 15, 1888 – March 12, 1954) was a school teacher and a Christian church minister in Perkins, Oklahoma and Gladewater. His mother, Helen Beatrice Langley Lawrence (December 6, 1897 – November 23, 1968) managed the Gladwater Hotel. Lawrence was very close to both of his parents and looked after them throughout their lives. Even with Lawrence's great success it was beyond his ability to get his mother to retire and move into a new luxurious home he had built for her in Dallas. She operated the hotel until her death in 1968.

== Education and military service ==
Lawrence attended Gladewater High School, graduating two years early, but with a less-than-stellar academic record. He then attended Kilgore Junior College, where his grades earned him membership in an academic honors group. Lawrence was hired in 1940 by Dallas Aviation School, where he became Director of Flying. The school was founded by Major William F. Long, who would employ Lawrence in two additional aviation positions after his wartime service.

Lawrence also attended the University of Texas at Austin, where he obtained a Bachelor of Business Administration in 1942. He served in the US Army Air Forces for two years during World War II, training with the RAAF in Dallas, Texas, and Toronto, Canada, and with LAAF at Sheppard Field and Bryan, Texas. He served in Toronto and at the LAAF Base Unit in Lemoore, California.

Lawrence married Jimmie George Bland of Greenville, Texas, in 1942. They had three sons and one daughter during their marriage. The couple divorced in 1966.

== British Flying Training School ==
The No. 1 British Flying Training School in Terrell, Texas, hired Lawrence in 1942. Major William F. Long, founder of Dallas Aviation School, also founded the Terrell RAF Cadet School in 1940. The US had just entered World War II and the civilian school procured a government contract to train British pilots.

Lawrence's duties included that of Link Trainer instructor. His abilities were quickly noticed, and he was subsequently promoted to supervise the school's maintenance department. Mr. Lawrence was promoted to director of the school. He remained with the school until 1944, and then spent two years on active duty with the US Air Force. The No. 1 British Flying Training School Museum, Inc., is dedicated to the preservation of the school's history.

On July 23, 2017, a Braniff Trail Historical Plaque was dedicated at the No. 1 British Flying Training School Museum to honor Harding Lawrence's earliest aviation job. The plaque is one of over 30 that will be placed around the world at locations that were important to the history of Braniff Airways.

== Essair and Pioneer Air Lines ==
After his release from the military, a flight school administrator from Terrell, Texas offered him a job in 1946 with Essair, a small commuter carrier based in Houston, Texas, which was also founded by Major Long. Essair became Pioneer Air Lines, and merged with Continental Airlines on April 1, 1955. While in Houston, Lawrence attended South Texas College of Law and received his LLB in 1949. He attended school at night while working at Pioneer during the day.

== Continental Airlines ==
The merger with Continental put Lawrence directly under the mentoring of Continental founder and President Robert Six, the long time CEO of Continental. Under his tutelage. Lawrence honed his airline administration skills. Six was quoted as saying "one of the biggest reasons we merged with Pioneer was to get Harding." Lawrence, at the time of the merger in 1955, was made Continental's vice president of traffic. He was elevated to executive vice president in 1958 remaining in this position until 1965, when he became President of Braniff International. During his ten-year tenure at Continental the airline grew by 500 percent.

== Braniff International Airways ==
In early 1965, Lawrence was seen throughout the Braniff International operation at Dallas Love Field. He had pen and paper in hand and appeared to be watching the bustling Braniff schedule with a keen intensity and specific interest, writing down everything that he saw. Everyone wondered who this was and what was his interest in Braniff.

Braniff employees soon found out he was their new president, hired by insurance magnate Troy V. Post, chairman of Greatamerica Corporation, to turn Braniff into a world class global airline. Braniff co-founder Thomas Elmer Braniff was an insurance magnate and now the third major owner (Senator William A. Blakley was the second largest owner of Braniff after 1954) of Braniff was also an insurance executive. Lawrence engineered a remarkable airline overhaul during his 16 years with Braniff International Airways. He retired on December 31, 1980, after a long battle to save Braniff from bankruptcy due to the competitive pressure of deregulation combined with a national economic downturn and unprecedented rises in fuel costs.

During his first month at Braniff, Lawrence executed an order for 12 new Boeing 727 aircraft, The aircraft had already been selected before his arrival but not yet ordered. These airplanes were the C model with a large freight loading door at the front of the aircraft, which allowed Braniff to begin late night cargo service while during the day regular passenger service was operated with the aircraft, doubling the 727 utilization rate and allowed Braniff to open a new cargo business that was called AirGo. The new 727s could also be outfitted in a cargo/passenger configuration, if needed.

The 727 would become the backbone of the Braniff Fleet and the key aircraft in its 1971 Fleet Standardization Plan that called for only three aircraft types: Boeing 727 on domestic service, 747 for Hawaii, and DC-8 for South America. When Lawrence took office in May, 1965, Braniff operated thirteen different aircraft types. Lawrence also increased daily utilization of its aircraft which increased revenue without adding more aircraft to the fleet.

Throughout Lawrence's tenure Braniff achieved record revenues, profits and traffic as detailed in month after month of Braniff B Liner Employee Newsletters, financial statements, and company annual reports. Under Lawrence's administration Braniff business volume grew from 100 million USD in 1965 to over 1.5 billion USD in 1980 and nearly doubled its passenger market share. Even during 1980 Braniff continued to set record traffic levels and revenues. Lawrence was bold with his management of Braniff even attempting to take over the much larger Pan American World Airways, Inc. in the early 1970s, which would have served the dual purpose of making Braniff a worldwide air carrier and giving Pan Am access to a United States domestic feeder system. Pan Am's Chairman Najeeb Halaby unfortunately refused the idea, preferring to pursue a merger with international competitor Trans World Airlines.

== Retirement and final years ==
In retirement Lawrence consulted for Pan Am at the request of his former associate C. Edward Acker in the early 1980s. (Ed Acker was executive vice president and president of Braniff from 1965 until 1975 and became Chairman of Pan Am in 1981.) During the 1980s, Lawrence worked at Wells Rich Greene advertising agency alongside his wife, advertising legend Mary Wells Lawrence who Lawrence married in November, 1967. Mary Wells Lawrence sold her advertising firm Wells Rich Greene in 1990. The Lawrence's enjoyed retirement throughout the 1990s and bought and sold real estate as a side line.

On September 22, 2001, Lawrence returned to his hometown of Perkins, Oklahoma, to act as grand marshal of the annual Old Settler's Fall Harvest. The theme for the 2001 Harvest was "Pioneers of Transportation" with Lawrence as the honored guest. The Perkins City Commission declared the Saturday event as "Harding L. Lawrence Day" and recognized Lawrence for his contributions to the airline industry.

Lawrence was accompanied to the Festival by his wife Mary Wells Lawrence, Mrs. Henry (Kathleen) Ford II, Ed and Sandy Acker, Jere Cox, and over 40 other family members and Braniff associates. Lawrence was inducted into the Oklahoma Aviation and Space Hall of Fame at the Omniplex at Oklahoma City, Oklahoma, on Saturday, September 22, 2001, the evening after the festivities in Perkins. Ed Acker presented the medal to Lawrence inducting him into the Hall of Fame. He was honored with a video history of his career followed by the induction. Lawrence gave a thirty-minute speech about the state of the airline industry using no notes or aids. This, his final public speech, received a standing ovation.

Lawrence died of pancreatic cancer at his villa in Mustique, Saint Vincent and the Grenadines, at the age of 81 on January 16, 2002. He was preceded in death by his son Harding L. Lawrence, Jr, in 1945, and his parents. He was survived by his son James B. Lawrence of Greenville, Texas, his ex-wife, Jimmie George Bland Lawrence, his wife Mary Wells Lawrence, a son State Rights Lawrence of Greenwich, Connecticut, and three daughters Deborah M. Lawrence of New York City, Kathy Bryan of Red Bank, New Jersey and Pamela Lombard of Geneva, Switzerland. At the time of his death Lawrence had seven grandchildren.

== Board memberships ==
- First National Bank of Dallas
- Dallas Council on World Affairs
- Pioneer Airlines
- Braniff Airways, Inc., Chairman
- Braniff International Corporation, Chairman
- Cessna Aircraft Corporation
- Ling-Temco-Vought, Inc.
- Norton Simon, Inc.
- King Resources Company
- Dallas County United Fund
- Dallas Grand Opera Association
- Travel Program for Foreign Diplomats
- Pan American Society of the US, Inc.

=== Other memberships ===
- Air Traffic Conference of America, president, 1950, organization of the traffic and sales officials of nation's 23 scheduled airlines
- Council for Latin America, trustee
- Delta Theta Phi Law Fraternity
- Airlift Committee, National Defense Transportation Association
- Advisory council, University of Texas Business Administration Foundation
- Wings Club, president, 1973

== Honors ==
- Order of Balboa, 1967, awarded by the president of Panama
- Title of Commander, Order of Bernardo O'Higgins, March 21, 1968, Santiago, Chile, awarded by the Government of Chile, highest civilian honor
- Order of the Sun, Peru's highest civilian decoration
- Gold Key Award, 1970, awarded by the Avenue of America's, other recipients include David Sarnoff and Nelson Rockefeller
- Distinguished Alumnus Award, awarded by the University of Texas, other recipients include Dr. Denton Cooley
- Travel Digest concluded that Harding Lawrence contributed the furthering of unity and understanding for the peoples of the Western Hemisphere and for the development of Inter American Trade and Tourism
- America's Award, 1978, awarded by America's Foundation for his innovative ideas unstinting labors in the development of trade and travel between the Americas which has brought about a closer cultural interchange and fostered friendship and understanding among the nations and peoples of this hemisphere
- Honorary LLD Degree, 1968, University of Portland, Oregon
- Honorary Juris Doctor, 1972, South Texas College of Law
- Distinguished Alumnus Award, University of Texas, 1966
- Golden Plate Award, American Academy of Achievement, 1965
