= History of Braniff International Airways =

History of American airline

Braniff Airways, later Braniff International Airways from 1948 until 1965, and then Braniff International from 1965 until the cessation of air operations, was an airline in the United States that operated from 1928 until 1982 and continues today as a retailer and administrative entity.

== Paul R. Braniff, Inc. ==
On April 26, 1926, Paul Revere Braniff incorporated Braniff Air Lines, Inc., with the Oklahoma Secretary of State but it was not used for airline operations and was eventually dissolved. On May 29, 1928, insurance magnate Thomas Elmer Braniff financed and founded an aviation company with his brother Paul, called Paul R. Braniff, Inc., doing business as Tulsa-Oklahoma City Airline. On June 20, 1928, service began from Oklahoma City to Tulsa using a single-engine 5 passenger Stinson Detroiter registered as NC1929 on June 20, 1928. Paul Braniff acted as pilot of the first flight with one passenger on board. The flight operated normally to Tulsa but was delayed for the return trip by thunderstorms in the Tulsa area.

The Braniff brothers remained a part of the company as the ownership was transferred to Universal Aviation Corporation in April 1929. With the purchase of the company by Universal, the entity began operating as Braniff Air Lines, Inc. Universal was a conglomerate of smaller airlines and railways that planned a southern US coast-to-coast air and rail service. In early 1930, the company was purchased by the Aviation Corporation (AVCO) holding company, which other holdings included the predecessors of American Airlines.

== Braniff Airways, Inc. ==
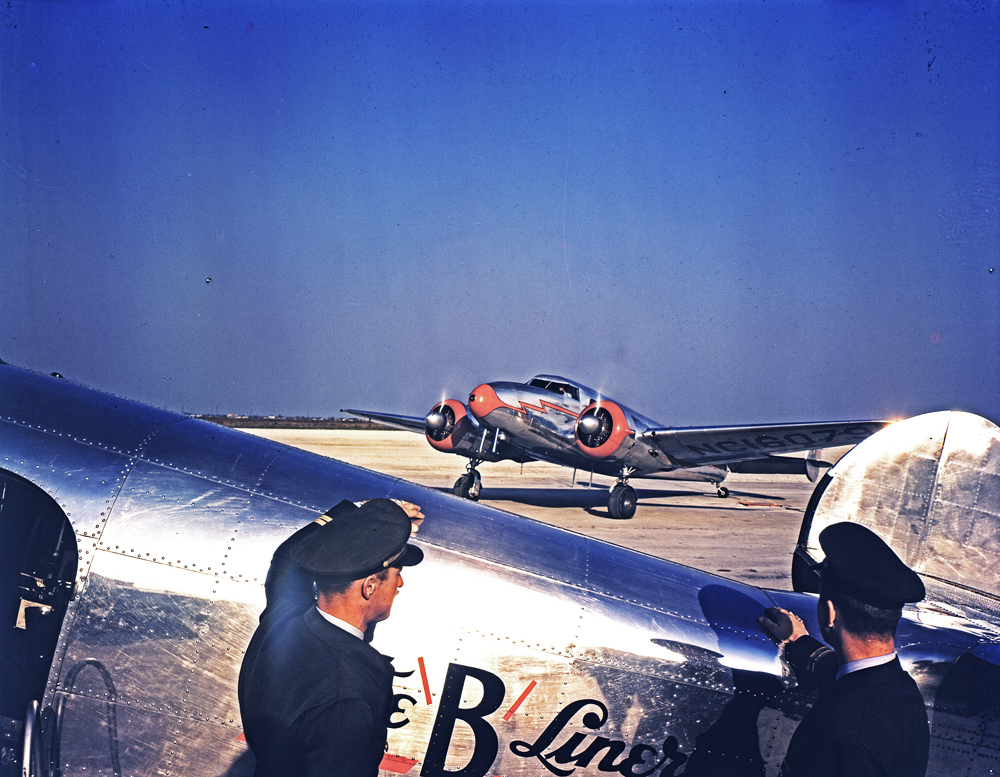
Braniff pilots outside a "B-Liner" Lockheed Model 10 Electra, Houston Hobby Airport, 1940. In the background is a Lockheed Model 12 Electra Junior.

Unable to remain out of the airline business for very long and with the new possibility of an air mail contract, the Braniff brothers started a new airline in November 1930 named Braniff Airways, Inc. Braniff Airways began service among Oklahoma City, Tulsa, and Wichita Falls, Texas, with 5 passenger Lockheed Vega single-engine prop aircraft. Service expanded throughout 1931 to include Kansas City, St. Louis, and Chicago, but the company briefly shut down to reorganize in 1933. With the help of its employees, who agreed to work without pay, the company was airborne again and in less than a year their hard work would pay off.

Braniff's survival was assured when Paul Braniff, then general manager, flew to Washington, D.C., to petition for the Chicago-Dallas airmail route 9. The United States Post Office granted Braniff its first airmail route in the wake of the 1934 Air Mail scandal. In 1935, Braniff became the first airline to fly from Chicago to the U.S.–Mexico border. Paul Braniff left the airline in 1935 to pursue other interests and to tour South America for Braniff's eventual service to the region, but Tom Braniff retained control of the carrier and hired Charles Edmund Beard to run day-to-day operations. Beard became president and CEO of Braniff in 1954, and Fred Jones of Oklahoma City became chairman of the board.

== Midwestern expansion ==
Braniff acquired Dallas-based Long and Harmon Airlines in January 1935, extending its network in Texas, and purchased it first twin-engine airliner, the Lockheed L-10A Electra. In 1937, Braniff bought its first cabin-sized twin-engine airliner the Douglas DC-2 from TWA for the extended network. With the DC-2s came the carrier's first flight attendants or Hostesses as Braniff dubbed them.

Braniff Airways acquired Ft. Worth, Texas-based Bowen Airlines, which was headquartered at Meacham Field, in January 1936. Bowen flew from Chicago to Houston via St. Louis, Springfield, Tulsa and Dallas; from Dallas to San Antonio with stops in Ft. Worth and Austin; and from Ft. Worth to Houston via Dallas. Bowen did not have any of the coveted Air Mail Contracts, and its reliance on passenger revenue caused financial strain, leading to the merger with Braniff. Bowen's slogan was "From the Great Lakes to the Gulf", which became the Braniff motto after the merger. Bowen had a fleet of Vultee V-1As, Lockheed Vegas, and Lockheed Orions built to Bowen's specifications.

== Wartime Service ==
During the war, Braniff remanded much of its new 21-passenger Douglas DC-3 fleet to the United States Army Air Force. The DC-3 had just entered the fleet in December 1939. All of the Airline's DC-2s were given to the military for wartime service and none were accepted back into the fleet at the end of the war. Besides offering its aircraft to the United States military, it also leased its facilities at Dallas Love Field to the military, which became a training site for pilots and mechanics.

Braniff was given a contract to operate a military cargo flight between Brownsville, Texas, and Panama City/Balboa City, in the Canal Zone. The route was called the Banana Run because Braniff's pilots made agreements with the banana producers in Panama to move their bananas to the United States to sell. Because of the war, they could not fly their produce out of the country but Braniff devised at least a small way to assist the growers. Because of Braniff's superb service during the war and over the Banana Run, the Airline would be rewarded with a significant international route award just a year after the war ended.

== Aerovias Braniff formed ==
Thomas Elmer Braniff created a Mexico-based airline, Aerovias Braniff, in 1943. Service began in March 1945, after the carrier received its operating permits from the Mexican government. Aerovias Braniff operated from Nuevo Laredo, Mexico, to Monterrey and Mexico City. The new company, owned by Mr. Braniff, had three 21 passenger Douglas DC-3s that had been allocated to the carrier from the United States War Surplus Administration in February, 1945.

Mr. Braniff had applied to the federal Civil Aeronautics Board (CAB) for authority to merge Aerovias Braniff with Braniff Airways, Inc. However, the Mexican government suspended Aerovias Braniff's operating permits in October 1946, under pressure from Pan American Airways, Inc., and merger of the two carriers was not approved by the CAB. Braniff was allowed to operate a charter service in Mexico for a brief period in 1947 but that was also discontinued and service was not commenced again until 1960

== Latin America route award ==
After World War II, on May 19, 1946, the Civil Aeronautics Board (CAB) awarded Braniff routes to the Caribbean, Mexico, Central and South America, competing with Pan American-Grace Airways (Panagra). The Civil Aeronautics Board awarded Braniff a 7719 statute mile route from Dallas to Houston to Havana, Balboa, C.Z., Panama, Guayaquil, Lima, La Paz, Asuncion, and finally Buenos Aires, Argentina. At that time, the airline changed its trade name to Braniff International Airways and flights to South America via Cuba and Panama began on June 4, 1948, with a routing of Chicago – Kansas City – Dallas – Houston – Havana – Balboa, C.Z. – Guayaquil – Lima (Lima service did not begin until June 18, 1948). after construction in remote regions of Central and South America. The route was then extended in February 1949 to La Paz and in March 1949, to Rio de Janeiro, Brazil. Douglas DC-4s and Douglas DC-6s flew to Rio; initially DC-3s flew Lima to La Paz. Braniff was the first airline authorized by the CAB to operate JATO or Jet Assisted Takeoff aircraft (DC-4) at La Paz.

Service was extended in March 1950 from La Paz to Asuncion, Paraguay, and in May 1950 to Buenos Aires, Argentina. Argentine President Juan Perón and his famed wife Evita Peron participated in the festivities at Palace Casa Rosada in Buenos Aires. In October 1951 departures from Dallas became daily: three a week to Buenos Aires and four to Rio. (Flights to South America stopped at Miami, but Braniff didn't carry domestic passengers there.)

== Mid-Continent Airlines merger ==
In October 1951 Braniff flew to 29 airports in the US, from Chicago and Denver south to Brownsville, Texas, to Central America, Cuba and South America.

After months of negotiations Braniff acquired Mid-Continent Airlines a small Kansas City-based trunk line on August 16, 1952. The merger added numerous cities, including Minneapolis/St. Paul, Sioux City, and Sioux Falls in the North; Des Moines, Omaha, and St. Louis in the Midwest; and Tulsa, Shreveport, and New Orleans in the South. The acquisition of the Minneapolis/St. Paul to Kansas City route (with stops in Des Moines and Rochester, Minnesota) was of particular interest to Braniff, as Mid-Continent had been awarded this route instead of Braniff in 1939.

After the merger Braniff operated 75 aircraft and over 4000 employees, including 400 pilots. In 1955 Braniff was the tenth largest US airline by passenger-miles and ninth largest by domestic passenger-miles.

With the addition of the South America route system, merger with Mid-Continent Airlines, and reduction in mail subsidy on the Mid-Continent system, Braniff International Airways recorded a US$1.8 million operating loss during 1953. Aircraft that were scheduled to be disposed of offset the loss and the company recorded a meager $11,000 net income. An increase in mail subsidy, requested by Mr. Braniff before his death, was granted in 1954, and the company returned to profitability.

== Deaths of the Braniff brothers ==
On January 10, 1954, Braniff founder Thomas Elmer Braniff died when a flying boat owned by United Gas crash-landed on the shore of Wallace Lake, 15 miles outside of Shreveport, Louisiana, due to icing. According to information from Captain George A. Stevens: "Mr Braniff was on a hunting expedition with a group of important citizens of Louisiana. They were returning to Shreveport from a small duck hunting lake near Lake Charles, Louisiana, in a Grumman Mallard aircraft with no deicing system. The wings iced up on approach to landing in Shreveport, and the plane lost altitude. One of the wings hit cypress stumps and the plane crashed against the shore. It caught fire and all 12 lives aboard were lost."

Braniff Executive Vice President Charles Edmund Beard became the first non-Braniff family member to assume the role of president of the airline after Tom Braniff's death. Beard gathered Braniff employees together at the Braniff hangar at Dallas Love Field on January 18, 1954, to announce that the airline would move forward and assured the public that the airline would continue.

Paul R. Braniff died later that year of cancer. Tom Braniff's wife, Bess Braniff, also died in August 1954. Tom's son, Thurman Braniff, was killed in a training plane crash at Oklahoma City in 1937, and his daughter Jeanne Braniff Terrell died in 1948 from complications of childbirth.

== New equipment and facilities ==
Beard led Braniff into the jet age. The first jets were four Boeing 707-227s; a fifth crashed on a test flight when still owned by Boeing. Braniff was the only airline to order the 707-227; in 1971 it sold them to British West Indies Airways (BWIA), an airline based in the Caribbean. Boeing 720s were added in the early 1960s. In 1965 Braniff's fleet was about half jet, comprising 707s, 720s and British Aircraft Corporation BAC One-Eleven jetliners. The long range Boeing 707-320C intercontinental model was then introduced. However, the 707, 720 and One-Eleven would all subsequently be removed from the fleet. Braniff's last piston schedule was operated with a Convair aircraft in September 1967 and the last Lockheed L-188 Electra turboprop service was flown about May 1969.

In February 1958 Braniff opened a new headquarters building at Exchange Park, a high-rise office development within sight of Dallas Love Field. The airline opened a Maintenance and Operations Base with over 433,000 square feet on the east side of Dallas Love Field at 7701 Lemmon Avenue in late 1958. The airline would occupy the facility until the late 1980s, with the Braniff, Inc. (Braniff II) holding company, Dalfort, remaining there until 2001.

== Supersonic transport ==
In April 1964 Braniff made deposits on two Boeing 2707 Supersonic Transports, $100,000 per aircraft. This would give Braniff slots number 38 and 44 when the SST began production. President Beard said the two aircraft would be used on the carrier's US to Latin America flights, where the Boeing 707 was performing satisfactorily.

When this deposit was made, the SST program was being financed by the US government, under an edict from President Kennedy. In 1971, Congress cancelled the program, against the Nixon Administration wishes.

== Greatamerica ==
In 1964 Troy Post, chairman of Greatamerica Corporation, an insurance holding company based in Dallas, purchased Braniff and National Car Rental as part of an expansion of holdings and growth outside the insurance business. Braniff and National were chosen after Greatamerica CFO C. Edward Acker identified them as under-utilized and under-managed companies. Acker had stated in a 1964 study that Braniff's conservative management was hampering the growth that the "jet age" required, in part by purchasing planes instead of financing them, diverting working capital from growth initiatives. As part of the acquisition, Acker became executive vice president and CFO of Braniff.

Troy Post hired Harding Lawrence, executive vice president of Continental Airlines, as the new president of Braniff International. Lawrence was determined to give Braniff a glossy, modern, and attention-getting image. Over the next 15 years, his expansion into new markets – combined with ideas unorthodox for the airline industry – led Braniff to record financial and operating performance, expanding its earnings tenfold despite typical passenger load factors around 50 percent.

== Mary Wells and "The End of the Plain Plane" ==
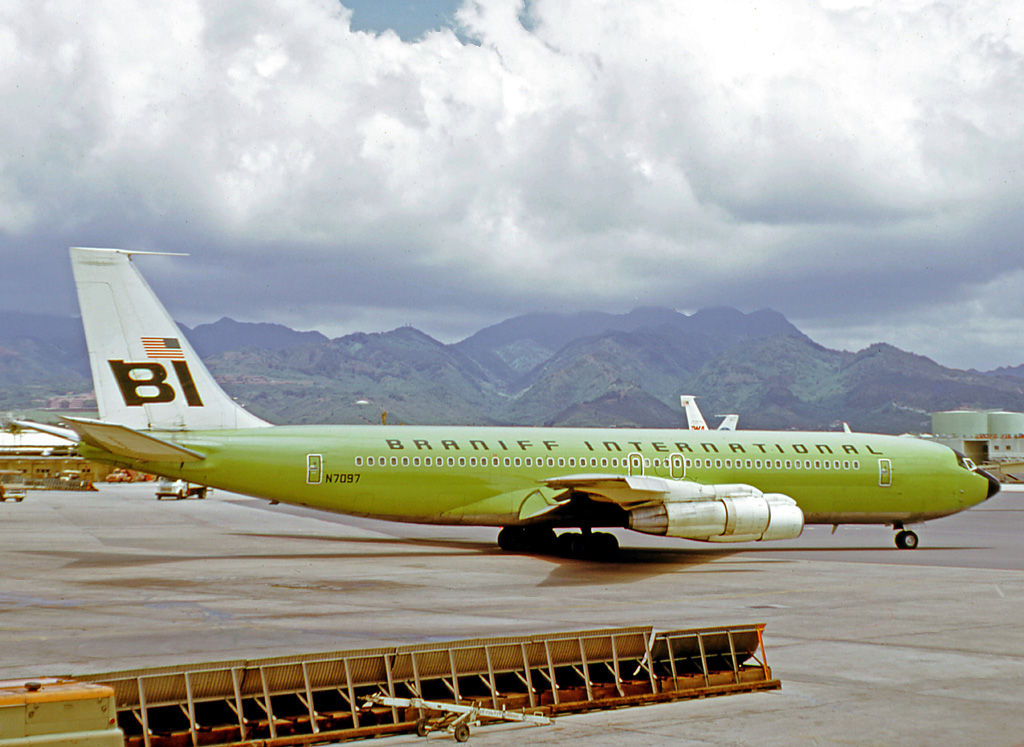
Boeing 707-320C of Braniff International at Honolulu Airport in 1971

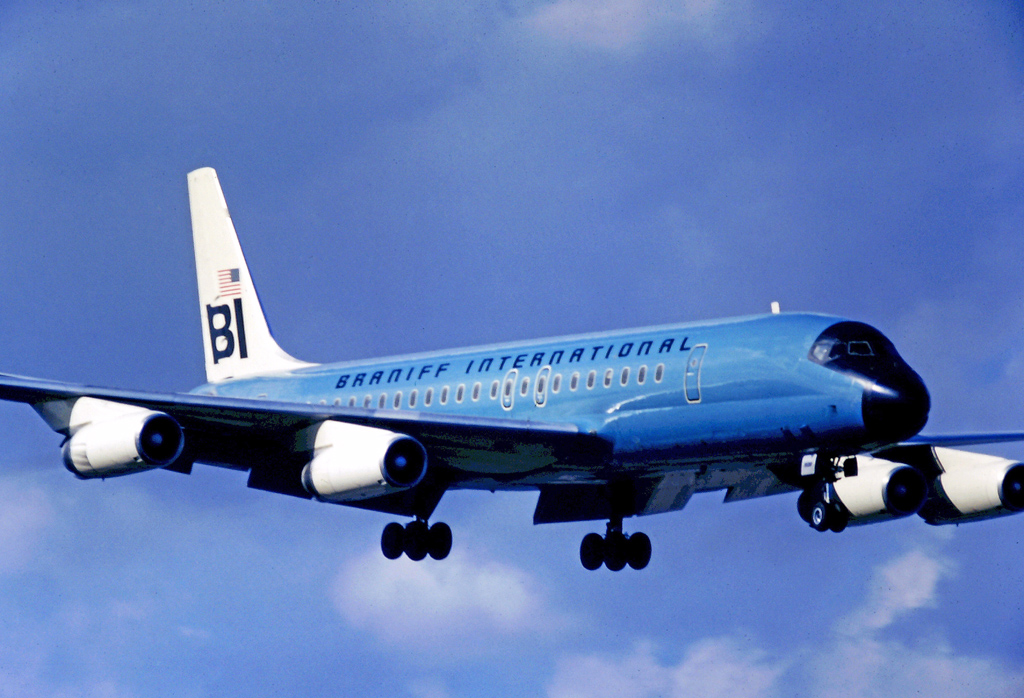
Braniff International Douglas DC-8-62 landing at Miami International Airport in 1971

To overhaul the Braniff image, Lawrence hired Jack Tinker and Partners, who assigned advertising executive Mary Wells – later Mary Wells Lawrence after her November, 1967 marriage to Harding Lawrence in Paris – as account leader. First on the agenda was to overhaul Braniff's public image — including the red, white, and blue "El Dorado Super Jet" livery which Wells saw as "staid". New Mexico architect Alexander Girard, Italian fashion designer Emilio Pucci, and shoe designer Beth Levine were hired, and with this new talent Braniff began the "End of the Plain Plane" campaign.

At Girard's recommendation the old livery was dropped in favor of a single color on each plane, selected from a palette of bright hues like "Chocolate Brown" and "Metallic Purple." He favored a small "BI" logo and small titles. Braniff engineering and Braniff's advertising department modified Girard's colors, enlarged the "BI" logo, and added white wings and tails. This, ironically, was based on the 1930s Braniff "Vega" Schemes, which also carried colorful paint with white wings and tails. The new "jelly bean" fleet carried such colors as beige, ochre, orange, turquoise, baby blue, medium blue, lemon yellow, and lavender. Lavender was dropped after a month, due to the similarity in coloration to the Witch Moth (Ascalapha odorata), a sign of bad luck in Mexican mythology.

Fifteen colors were used during the 1960s (Harper & George modified Girard's original seven colors in 1967), in combination with 57 variations of Herman Miller fabrics. Many of the color schemes were applied to aircraft interiors, gate lounges, ticket offices, and even the corporate headquarters. Art to complement the color schemes was flown in from Mexico, Latin America, and South America. Girard designed an extensive line of furniture for Braniff's ticket offices and customer lounges. This furniture was made available to the public by Herman Miller, for a year in 1967.

Pucci used a series of nautical themes for crew uniforms. For the hostesses, Pucci used "space age" themes, including plastic Space Helmets and Bolas (as dubbed by Pucci). These clear plastic bubbles, which resembled Captain Video helmets and which Braniff termed "RainDome", were to be worn between the terminal and the plane to prevent hairstyles from being disturbed by outside elements. "RainDomes" were dropped after about a month because the helmets cracked easily, there was no place to store them on the aircraft, and jetways at many airports made them unnecessary. For the footwear, Beth Levine created plastic boots and designed two-tone calfskin boots and shoes. Later uniforms and accessories were composed of interchangeable parts, which could be removed and added as needed.

Emilio Pucci designed the Pucci Pant Dress Collection for the intro of Braniff's first new Boeing 747 dubbed "747 Braniff Place: The Most Exclusive Address in the Sky" (1971). The collection was debuted at the Dallas Hilton by Pucci himself, in 1970. Today, all of the vintage Pucci attire designed for Braniff is valuable. Besides the 1965 and 1971 Collections, Pucci designed new Braniff uniform Collections in 1966, 1968, 1972, and 1974.

== MAC Charters ==
In 1966 Braniff investor Troy V. Post, by now a regular at the Johnson White House, obtained a government contract to transport military personnel from Vietnam to Hawaii for their R&R furloughs during the Vietnam War. The Military Air Command routes were expanded in the Pacific and added to the Atlantic side in 1966.

== Merger with Panagra ==
On February 1, 1967, Braniff purchased Pan American-Grace Airways (known as Panagra) from shareholders of Pan American World Airways and W.R. Grace, increasing its presence in South America. The merger was effective on February 1, 1967, and Panagra's remaining piston airliners were retired. Panagra operated early model Douglas DC-8s, which were a new addition to the Braniff fleet; a Panagra order for five long range DC-8-62s was taken up by Braniff and deliveries began in late 1968, replacing the older Series 30 Panagra DC-8s.

Revenue Passenger-Miles (Millions)(Sched Service Only)
	Braniff	Panagra	Mid-Continent
1951	332	126	9
1955	680	161	(merged 1952)
1960	1181	198	
1965	1804	278	
1970	4262	(merged 1967)	
1975	6290		

== "When You Got It — Flaunt It" ==
Under the leadership of George Lois and his advertising firm Lois, Holland and Calloway, Braniff started a campaign that showed the likenesses of Andy Warhol, Sonny Liston, Salvador Dalí, Whitey Ford, the Playboy Bunny, and other celebrities of the time flying Braniff. After the Plain Plane Campaign, it became one of the most celebrated marketing efforts Madison Avenue had ever produced, blending style and arrogance. One advertising slogan was "When you got it — flaunt it."

Management considered the campaign a success, but some customers thought the campaign exhibited grandiose behavior and bragging when service levels were not always good. Braniff, however, reported an 80 percent increase in business during the life of the campaign in spite of an economic downturn the following year.

== "Terminal of the Future" and JetRail ==
Braniff opened the "Terminal of the Future" at Dallas Love Field in late 1968, and operated Jetrail at Dallas Love Field from 1970 to 1974. Jetrail was the world's first fully automated monorail system, taking passengers from remote parking lots at Love Field to the Braniff terminal. Braniff was a key partner in the planning of Dallas/Fort Worth International Airport and contributed many innovations to the airline industry during this time.

== Remaking the jet fleet ==
Braniff had been one of the first U.S. operators of the BAC One-Eleven (and the first U.S. airline to order the twin jet), but in 1965 Lawrence ordered twelve new Boeing 727-100s and cancelled most of the remaining One-Eleven orders. The 727s had been selected before Lawrence's arrival, but no orders had been placed. These planes were the "quick change" (B727-100QC) model, with a large freight loading door on the left side just aft of the flight deck. This allowed Braniff to begin late-night cargo service, while the aircraft carried passengers during the day. This doubled the 727 utilization rate and allowed Braniff to open a new cargo business, AirGo. The new 727s could also be outfitted in a mixed cargo/passenger combi aircraft configuration and Braniff did operate "red eye" overnight services carrying cargo in the forward section with seating for 51 passengers in the rear coach compartment.

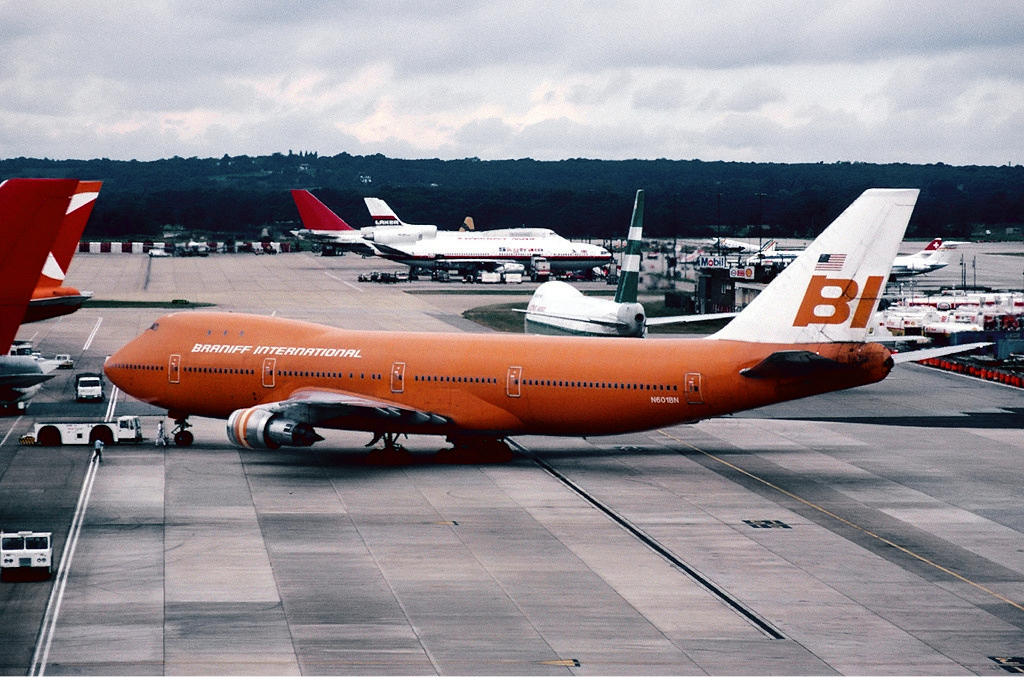
Boeing 747-100 at London Gatwick Airport in 1981

In 1970 Braniff accepted delivery of the 100th Boeing 747 built – a 747-127, N601BN – and began flights from Dallas to Honolulu, Hawaii on January 15, 1971. This plane, dubbed "747 Braniff Place" and "The Most Exclusive Address In The Sky", was Braniff's flagship, and it flew an unprecedented 15 hours per day with a 99 percent dispatch reliability rate. In 1978 N601BN flew the first flight from Dallas/Fort Worth to London.

The Braniff 747 livery of bright orange led to the aircraft being nicknamed "The Great Pumpkin". The popularity of "The Great Pumpkin" led to extensive publicity, and even the marketing of a scale model by the Airfix model company.

The Boeing 727 became the backbone of the Braniff fleet. The trijet was the key aircraft in the 1971 Fleet Standardization Plan that called for three aircraft types: the Boeing 727 primarily operated on domestic services, the Boeing 747 for Hawaii, and the Douglas DC-8 for South America. This plan would lower operating costs. When Lawrence took office in May 1965, Braniff operated 13 different aircraft types. Braniff eventually ordered several variants of the 727 including the "quick change" cargo/passenger combi aircraft variant, the stretched 727-200, and later the 727-200 Advanced. Lawrence also increased utilization of the fleet.

In 1969 the Lockheed L-188 Electras were retired, making Braniff all jet. By the mid-1970s Braniff's fleet of 727s showed the efficiencies that a single type of aircraft could produce. In 1975 Braniff had one 747, 11 DC-8s, and 70 727s. The Douglas DC-8s were aging, and there was speculation whether new Boeing 757s, Boeing 767s or Airbus A300s would replace the long range DC-8-62s (which flew Braniff's South American routes including nonstops from Los Angeles and New York City to Bogotá, Colombia and Lima, Peru as well as nonstops from Miami and New York City to Buenos Aires) with McDonnell Douglas MD-80s possibly being introduced on shorter routes. In 1978 Braniff announced it had chosen the Boeing 757 and 767 to replace the DC-8s over its Latin America Division routes, but the airline never operated the 757, 767, A300 or MD-80.

== Alexander Calder ==
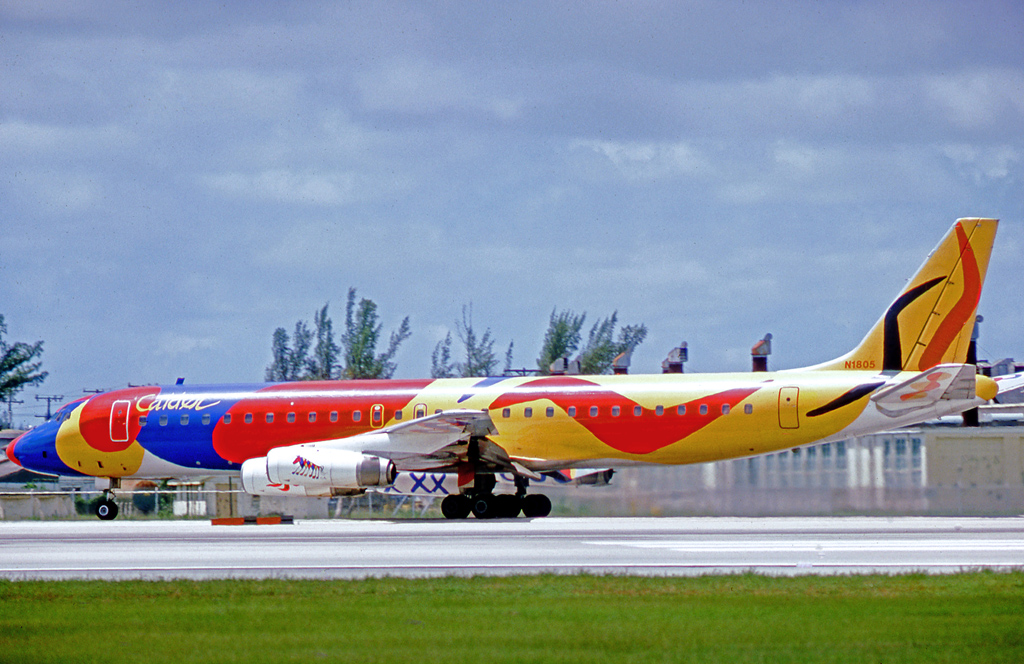
Braniff Douglas DC-8-62 wearing Alexander Calder's Flying Colors of South America design at Miami Airport in August 1975

In 1973 Alexander Calder was commissioned by Braniff to paint an aircraft. Calder was introduced to Harding Lawrence by veteran advertising executive George Gordon, who would eventually take over the Braniff advertising account. Calder's contribution was a Douglas DC-8 known simply as "Flying Colors of South America." In 1975 it was showcased at the Paris Air Show in Paris, France. Its designs reflected the bright colors and simple designs of South America and Latin America, and was used mainly on South American flights.

Later in 1975 he debuted "Flying Colors of the United States" to commemorate the Bicentennial of the United States. This time, the aircraft was a Boeing 727-200. First Lady Betty Ford dedicated "Flying Colors of the United States" in Washington, D.C. on, November 17, 1975. Calder died in November 1976 as he was finalizing a third livery, termed "Flying Colors of Mexico" or "Salute To Mexico". Consequently, this livery was not used on any Braniff aircraft.

== Halston and the Elegance Campaign ==
In 1977 Braniff commissioned American couturier Halston to bring an elegant and refined feel to Braniff. The new Ultrasuede uniforms and leather aircraft interiors were dubbed the Ultra Look by Halston, who had used the term to describe his elegant fashions. The Ultra Look was applied to all uniforms and the entire Braniff fleet (including the two Calder aircraft). The Ultra Look was an integral part of Braniff's new Elegance Campaign, which was designed to show the maturing of Braniff, as well as the look and feel of opulence throughout the airline's operation. Halston's uniforms and simple designs were praised by critics and passengers.

== Concorde SST ==
In 1978 Braniff Chairman Harding L. Lawrence negotiated a unique interchange agreement to operate the Concorde over American soil. Concorde service began in 1979 between Dallas–Fort Worth and Washington, D.C., with service to Paris and London on interchange flights with Air France and British Airways. Flights between Dallas-Fort Worth and Washington Dulles airports carried Braniff cockpit and cabin crews, while British or French crews flew across the Atlantic. Transfer of registration took place in Washington on each flight.

Braniff became the registered operator of the planes while on U.S. domestic service, and the planes were physically re-numbered with temporary adhesive vinyl. Registration was then returned to Air France or British Airways on the trans-Atlantic leg. Over American soil, the Concorde was limited to Mach 0.95, though crews often flew just above Mach 1; the planes flew at Mach 2 over open water.

Concorde service proved a loss leader for Braniff. Braniff charged only a 10 percent premium over standard first-class fare to fly the Concorde – and later removed the surcharge altogether – but the 100-seat plane often flew with no more than 15 passengers. Meanwhile, Boeing 727s scheduled 5–10 minutes slower on the same route were filled routinely.

Many postcards show a Braniff painted Concorde, but the Braniff livery was never applied to the left side of any Concorde, and the aircraft remained in the colors of British Airways and Air France. Braniff ended Concorde flights on June 30, 1980.

== Deregulation and global expansion ==
Until 1980 Braniff was one of the fastest-growing and most-profitable airlines in the United States. However, deregulation of the airline industry was introduced in October 1978, and Braniff – as well as many of the United States' major air carriers – misjudged this unprecedented change in airline business.

Lawrence believed that the answer to deregulation was to expand Braniff's route system dramatically or face an immediate erosion of Braniff's highly profitable routes as a result of unbridled competition from new low-cost carriers. He therefore enlarged the domestic network by 50% on December 15, 1978, adding 16 new cities and 32 new routes, which Braniff said was the "largest single-day increase by any airline in history". The expansion was successful operationally and financially. Although the expansion of 1978 was successful it did not deter losses from beginning in late 1979 as a result of unprecedented rises in fuel costs and "credit card" interest rates of 20 percent and higher coupled with general economic unrest. As a result, Braniff reported its first operating loss since the recession of 1970. The operating loss was $39 million in 1979, then $120M in 1980 and $107M in 1981.

In 1979, international hubs were created in Boston and Los Angeles to handle expected increases in travel outside North America while international service was increased from Dallas/Fort Worth. From Boston and Dallas/Fort Worth, new transatlantic Boeing 747 service to Europe was operated to Amsterdam, Brussels, Frankfurt and Paris. From Los Angeles, new nonstop transpacific Boeing 747 service was flown to Guam and Seoul with direct, no change of plane 747 flights being operated to Hong Kong and Singapore. This international expansion was also planned to have included flights to Tokyo, as well as an "oil run" between Dallas-Fort Worth, Houston, and Dubai; however, these routes never commenced. Besides standard model 747s, long range 747SPs were acquired as well for these new international flights with the 747 also being operated to South America. Also in 1979, Braniff began operating nonstop flights between Honolulu and Guam, Los Angeles and Seattle as well as one stop service between Honolulu and Hong Kong via Guam in addition to its long running nonstop service between Honolulu and Dallas/Fort Worth.

The main impediment to Braniff's expansion was fuel cost, which increased 94 percent during 1979. Some of the expected new business never materialized; 747 service from the new Boston hub did poorly, with the huge planes flying nearly empty. The expense of the new equipment and the new hubs increased Braniff's debt tremendously.

In late 1978 Braniff moved to a sprawling new headquarters, Braniff Place, just inside the western grounds of the airport. The beautiful employee playground/administration/training facility was the first of its kind and was later used as the model for Google and Apple headquarters design. Braniff's sub-par load factors – which were especially intolerable on the expensive-to-operate 747s – combined with record-breaking fuel cost escalations, unprecedented interest rates, and a national recession, produced massive financial shortfalls. These shortfalls led to creditors requesting the retirement of Harding Lawrence in December 1980. By 1981, all 747 service to Asia and Europe with the exception of nonstop flights between Dallas/Fort Worth and London had been discontinued although Braniff continued to operate the 747 on international service to Bogotá, Buenos Aires and Santiago in South America as well as on domestic flights between Dallas/Fort Worth and Honolulu.

== John J. Casey becomes president ==
On January 7, 1981, the board of directors elected John J. Casey as President, chief executive officer and chairman of Braniff Airways, Inc. and Braniff International Corporation as a replacement to the outgoing and retiring Harding Lawrence. Former Braniff president Russ Thayer was elected as vice chairman of the board, William Huskins as executive vice president, Neal J. Robinson as executive vice president of marketing, and Edson "Ted" Beckwith as executive vice president of finance.

John Casey expanded Braniff's capacity during the summer of 1981. An unforeseen strike by the Professional Air Traffic Controllers Organization (PATCO) caused delays and a decrease in traffic that created large losses for Braniff. Casey then implemented the Braniff Strikes Back Campaign in the fall of 1981, streamlining the carrier's air fare structure into a simplified two-tier fare system. As part of this campaign, some Boeing 727s were divided into Braniff Premier Service (traditional First Class service) and Coach Class. The remainder of the 727s were all-Coach Class with reduced fares. The campaign was not successful, pushing Braniff's bread-and-butter business travelers over to traditional airlines with First Class on all flights.

== Howard Putnam becomes president ==
In fall 1981 Braniff Chairman John Casey was told by the Braniff board that a new president needed to be found to try to curb Braniff's mounting losses. Casey met with Southwest Airlines President Howard A. Putnam and offered him the Braniff executive position. Putnam accepted the offer, but he required that his own financial manager from Southwest Airlines, Philip Guthrie, be allowed to follow him to Braniff.

Howard Putnam implemented a one-fare-structure plan called the Texas Class Campaign. Texas Class created a one-fare, one-service airline domestically and removed First Class from all Braniff aircraft. Only flights to South America and London, and to Hawaii, would offer full First Class services. In the program's first month in operation, December 1981, Braniff's revenues dropped from slightly over $100 million per month to $80 million. Braniff no longer had the revenue structure to maintain its cash requirements. In January 1982, Braniff recorded its first negative cash flow. Competition throughout the Braniff system, and increased service at Dallas-Ft. Worth International Airport by American Airlines and Delta Air Lines, both of which operated hubs at DFW, caused further erosion in revenue.

== Eastern buys South America routes ==
In early 1982 Braniff Chairman Howard Putnam decided to sell the Latin American Division. Negotiations had been underway with Pan American World Airways since early 1982, but the Civil Aeronautics Board would not approve sale to Pan Am because it felt that Pan Am would have a monopoly over other American carriers in the region. Pan American responded by offering to jointly lease the routes with Air Florida for three years at a price of $30 million. Pan American Chairman, and former Braniff International President, Ed Acker had previously served as Chairman of Air Florida before taking the leadership position at Pan American. The CAB decided that it would not change its position in spite of the joint service application.

Braniff International maintained that it was hemorrhaging cash and that it could not continue to operate the money losing South American system. Braniff entered into negotiations with Eastern Airlines to lease the routes to the Miami-based carrier for $18 million effective June 1, 1982, for one year. On April 26, 1982, the Civil Aeronautics Board approved the Eastern/Braniff lease agreement in a 5–0 unanimous decision. Eastern Chairman Frank Borman reported that Eastern had paid Braniff an initial payment of $11 million with the remaining $7 million to be paid at the end of 1982. Eastern initially offered to lease the routes for $30 million for six years but the CAB denied the request stating that it was too long. Eastern had been trying unsuccessfully to obtain authority to fly to South America since 1938, and would operate 24 weekly flights from Miami, two from New York, and one from New Orleans to west coast South American cities that Braniff mainly served.

Under the agreement Braniff International would retain service to Venezuela and American Airlines would serve Braniff's Brazilian services as required by a bilateral treaty between the United States and Brazil. Approval from South American governments for Eastern's one-year lease of Braniff's routes would not be required according to United States officials. Braniff International lauded the CAB's quick decision as the carrier had stated that because of its tenuous cash position that it might have to shut the routes down if an agreement was not approved. Braniff ceased operations on May 12–13, 1982, and Eastern took over the routes earlier than the planned June 1, 1982, commencement of service date.

Eastern Airlines had reported losses for 1981 and felt that the purchase of Braniff's South America routes would help, but Eastern's financial condition worsened through the 1980s. Eastern never made a profit with their South American routes, due to the region's delicate financial situation at the time. On April 26, 1990, the United States Department of Transportation approved the sale of Eastern Airlines' Latin American routes to American Airlines for $349 million. Eastern had recently filed for Chapter 11 bankruptcy protection and planned to use the money from the route sale to repay creditors and regain its financial footing. The funds were placed into a special fund controlled by Eastern's creditors who had recently ousted controversial Chairman Frank Lorenzo, who took over the 60-year-old aviation legend in 1986.

== Ceasing operations ==
On May 11, 1982, Howard Putnam left a courtroom at the Federal Courthouse in Brooklyn, New York City after failing to gain a court injunction to stop a threatened pilot strike. However, Putnam was successful in obtaining an extension of time from Braniff's principal creditors until October 1982. The next day, on May 12, Braniff Airways ceased all operations, ending 54 years of service. Braniff flights at Dallas-Fort Worth International Airport that morning were suddenly grounded, and passengers were forced to disembark, being told that Braniff no longer existed. A thunderstorm provided an excuse to cancel many afternoon flights that day, although Braniff's legendary Boeing 747 Flight 501 to Honolulu departed as scheduled, with the crew later refusing to divert the flight to Los Angeles International Airport. The flight returned to DFW the following morning, the last scheduled Braniff flight.

In the following days Braniff jets at Dallas-Fort Worth sat idle on the apron by Terminal 2W. The Douglas DC-8-62 fleet was flown from Miami to Dallas Love Field and stored until new owners could be found.

With an approved bankruptcy reorganization agreement with Hyatt Corporation a new Braniff, Inc., would be created from the assets of Braniff Airways, Inc. and Braniff International Corporation and would begin operations on March 1, 1984. Braniff Place World Headquarters, which the carrier occupied until December 15, 1983, on the west side of DFW Airport eventually became GTE Place, and then Verizon Place.

== Successor organizations ==
Former Braniff employees founded Minnesota-based Sun Country Airlines in 1983. It operated a fleet of Boeing 727-200s and wide body McDonnell Douglas DC-10s until 2001 when it filed for bankruptcy. Sun Country then reorganized and currently flies a modern fleet of Boeing 737-700 and 737-800 aircraft.

Fort Worth Airlines was founded in 1984 by Thomas B. King, a former Braniff vice president; two-thirds of the airline's executives came from Braniff, and even its office furniture was Braniff surplus bought at the airline's bankruptcy liquidation sale. Fort Worth Airlines used 56-seat NAMC YS-11 aircraft and flew to destinations in Oklahoma and Texas, but was unable to operate profitably, ceasing flights and filing for bankruptcy in 1985.

Two airlines were formed from the assets of Braniff:

- Braniff, Inc, founded in 1983 by the Hyatt Corporation under the umbrella corporation Dalfort. The airline adopted a low-fare business model in 1984, only to collapse in late 1989, a victim of intense fare competition and mounting debts amid a general industry downturn.
- Braniff International Airlines, Inc., founded in 1991 by financier Jeffrey Chodorow, whose company BNAir, Inc. purchased the assets of the moribund Braniff, Inc. Plagued by intense competition and by turmoil and malfeasance in its own upper management, the reborn airline dissolved in 1992.

The book Deregulation Knockouts, Round 2 documents at least two attempts to use the Braniff name in operations subsequent to the above attempts. One plan would have based the company again at Dallas-Fort Worth International Airport, utilizing Boeing 757 aircraft. Another planned operation would have been based at Wichita Mid-Continent Airport and would have offered discounted fares to members of a "Braniff Club".

Braniff Airways, Inc.'s, original Tax ID number (FEIN) – is retained by a company named Asworth (the last two letter of DallAS and the second word in Ft WORTH) in Dallas. Asworth was formed out of the assets of Dalfort Corporation and is responsible for paying pilot pensions according to the Braniff Retired Pilots Group, B.I.S.E.

== Braniff today ==
In early 2015, a series of new Braniff companies were reincorporated in the State of Oklahoma, for historical purposes and for administration of the Braniff trademarks, copyrights and other intellectual property. These companies included Braniff Air Lines, Inc., Paul R. Braniff, Inc., Braniff Airways, Inc. and Braniff International Corporation. In addition, during 2017 and 2018, certain of the original Braniff companies were reinstated for historical and support purposes of the Airline's intellectual property.

The trademarks, copyrights and other intellectual property of Braniff Airways, Incorporated, Braniff International Corporation and Braniff, Inc., are owned by the reinstated Braniff Airways, Incorporated, of the Braniff Building, 324 North Robinson Avenue, Suite 100, Oklahoma City, Oklahoma.
