= XBP =

XBP or xbp may refer to:

- XBP, the FAA LID code for Bridgeport Municipal Airport, Wise County, Texas
- xbp, the ISO 639-3 code for Bibbulman language, Western Australia
