= Monterey Regional Airport =

Regional airport in Monterey, California

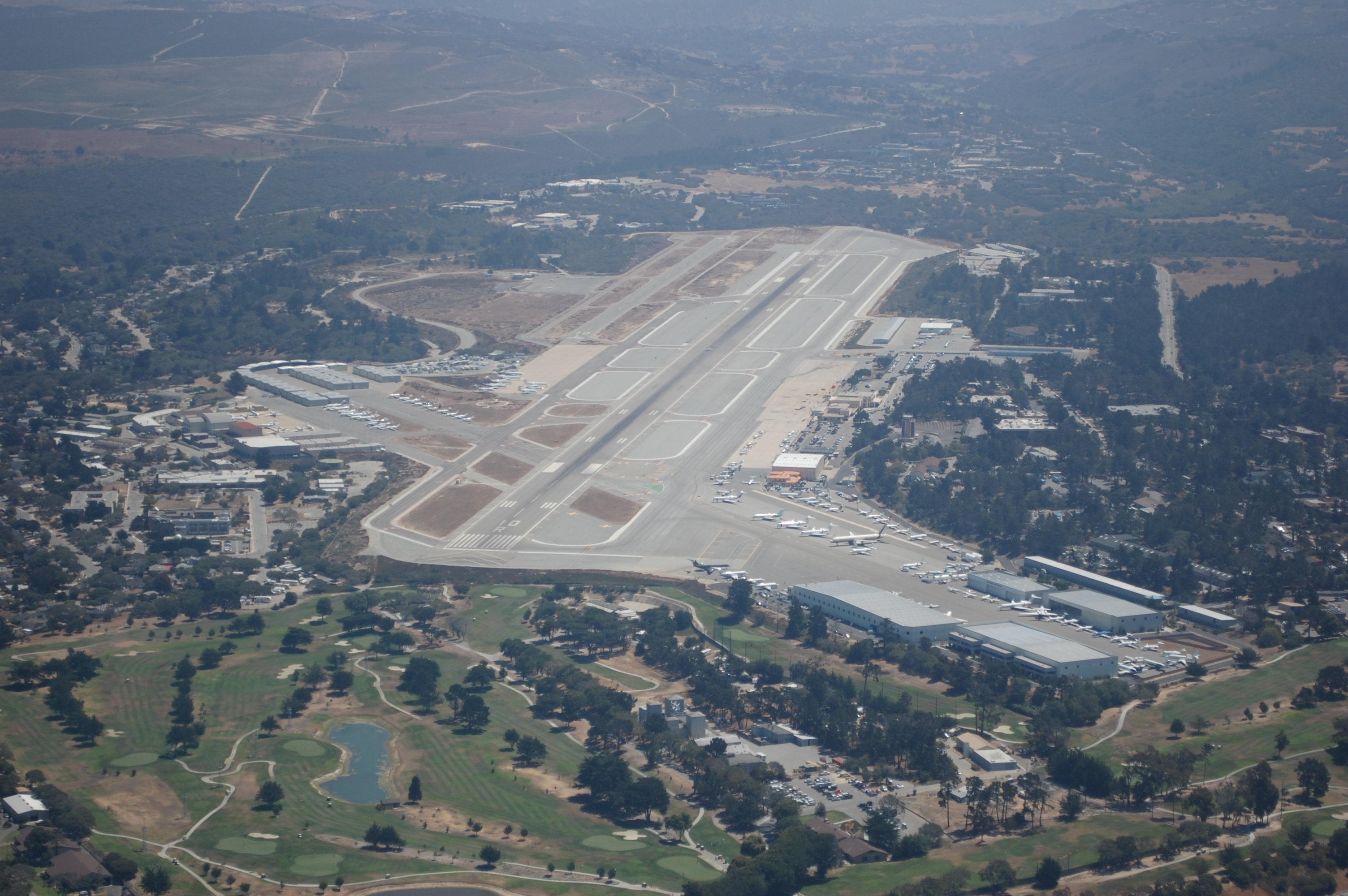
- IATA: MRY; ICAO: KMRY; FAA LID: MRY

Summary
- Operator: Monterey Peninsula Airport District
- Serves: Monterey County
- Location: Monterey, California
- Elevation AMSL: 257 ft (78 m)
- Coordinates: 36°35′13″N 121°50′35″W
- Website: montereyairport.com

Maps
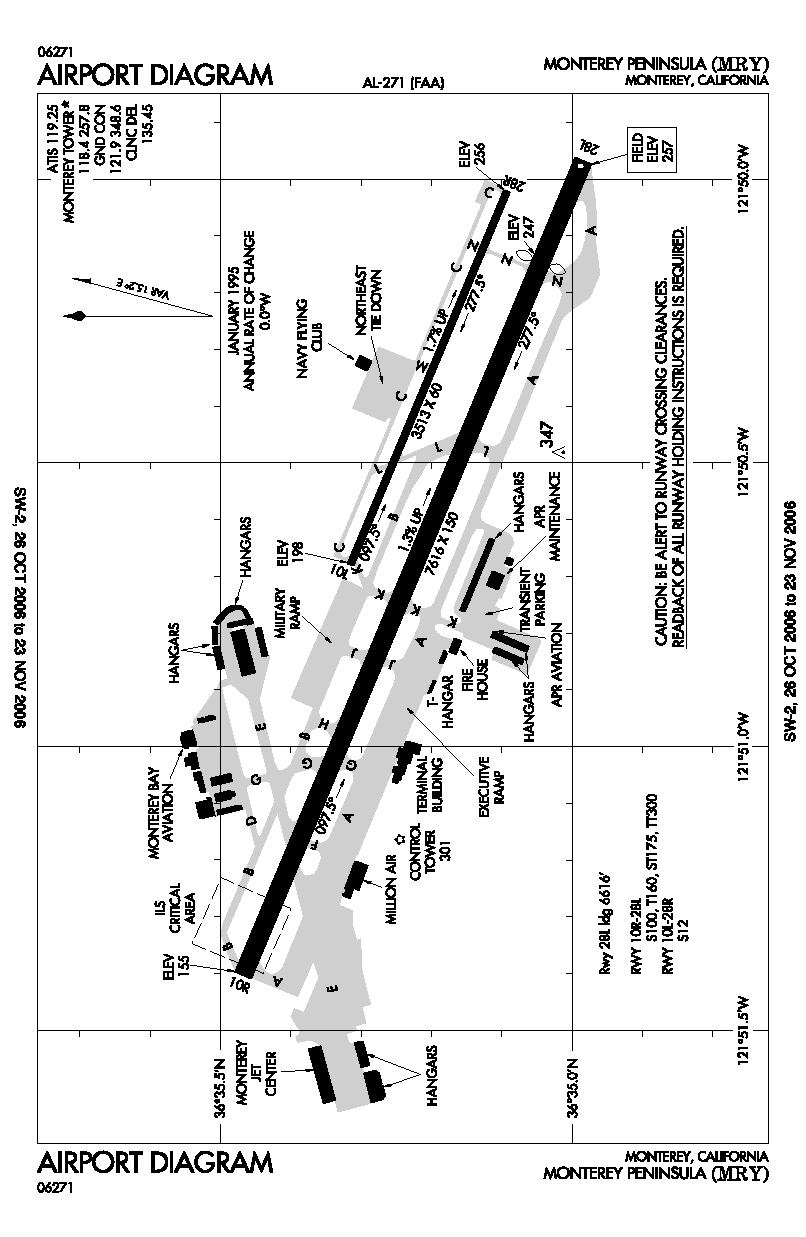
- FAA airport diagram
- Interactive map of Monterey Regional Airport

Runways
Direction	Length		Surface
Direction	ft	m	Surface
10R/28L	7,175	2,187	Asphalt
10L/28R	3,503	1,068	Asphalt

Statistics (2025)
- Aircraft operations: 54,094
- Total passengers: 659,867
- Federal Aviation Administration

Monterey Regional Airport (IATA: MRY, ICAO: KMRY, FAA LID: MRY) is a public airport in Monterey, California, United States. Established in 1936, it was known as the Monterey Peninsula Airport until September 14, 2011.

The airport is owned by the municipalities that make up the Monterey Peninsula Airport District. It is a public entity and its five-member board of directors is publicly elected.

The airport has its origins with flights from the polo field of the Hotel Del Monte in 1910. In 1941, local communities formed the Monterey Peninsula Airport District and acquired land to build an airport. World War II intervened, and the U.S. Navy leased the land, opening Naval Auxiliary Air Station Monterey on May 23, 1943. The Navy remained at the airport until 1972.

== Runways ==
The airport covers 496 acres (201 ha) and has two runways:

- 10R/28L: 7,175 ft × 150 ft (2,187 m × 46 m) asphalt
- 10L/28R: 3,503 ft × 60 ft (1,068 m × 18 m) asphalt

== Airlines and destinations ==
=== Passenger ===
Airlines	Destinations	Refs.
Alaska Airlines	San Diego, Seattle/Tacoma	
Allegiant Air	Las Vegas	
American Airlines	Dallas/Fort Worth; Seasonal: Phoenix–Sky Harbor	
American Eagle	Phoenix–Sky Harbor	
Delta Connection	Los Angeles, Salt Lake City (both begin December 19, 2026)	
JSX	Seasonal: Burbank, Orange County	
United Airlines	Seasonal: Chicago–O'Hare	
United Express	Denver, Los Angeles, San Francisco	

=== Destinations map ===
Destinations map
Mainland U.S. Destinations from MRY
Red = Year-round destination
Green = Seasonal destination
Blue = Future destination

As of July 2026, Allegiant Air, American Airlines, and United Airlines are the only airlines serving Monterey with mainline jets. Allegiant planned to fly Boeing 757-200s nonstop to Honolulu starting in November 2012; however, this Hawaii service never started and was subsequently permanently cancelled. Avelo Airlines also planned Boeing 737-800 service to Burbank beginning in September 2021; however, this service was also cancelled before it launched.

== Statistics ==
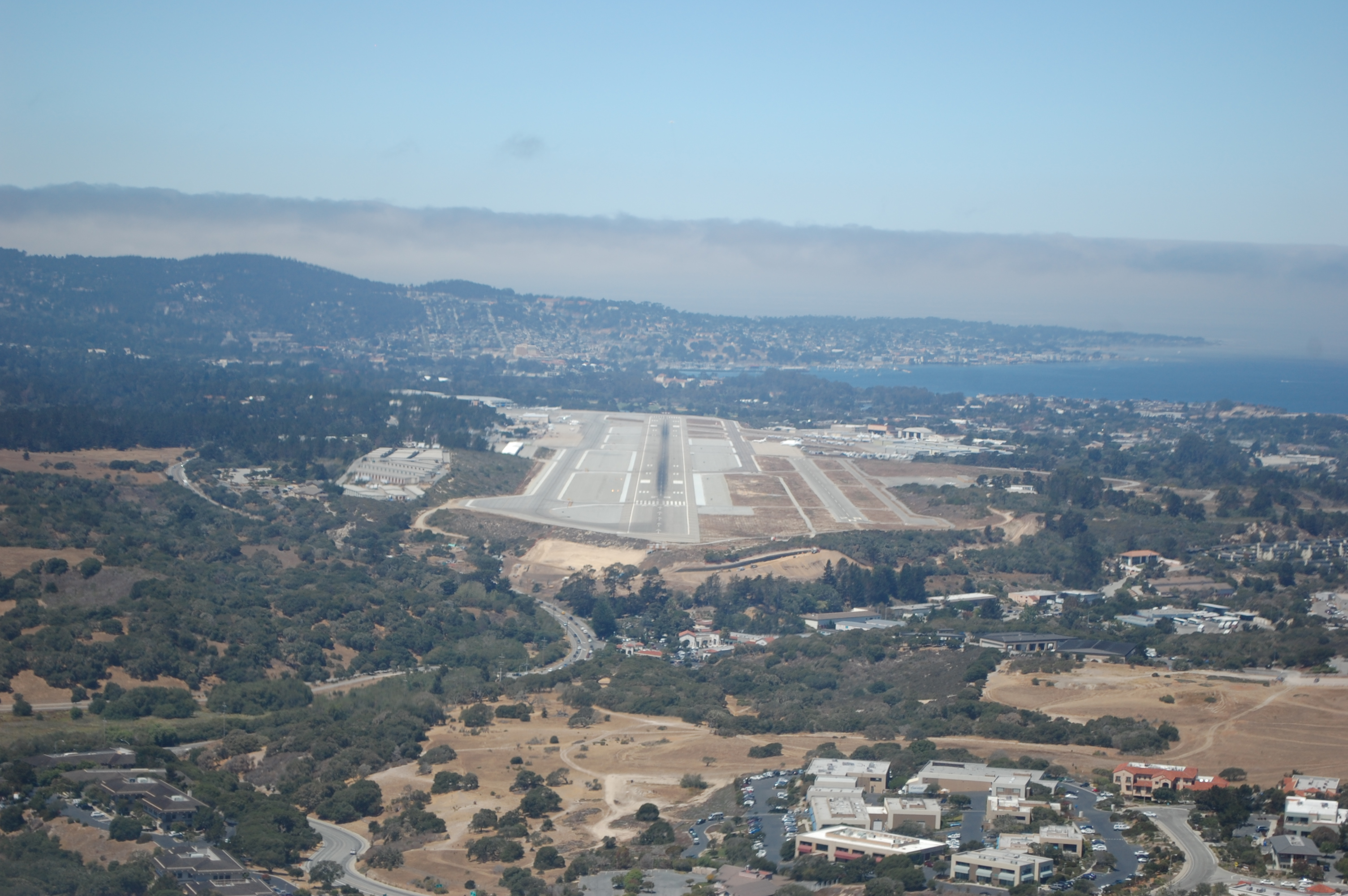
Final approach for Runway 28L

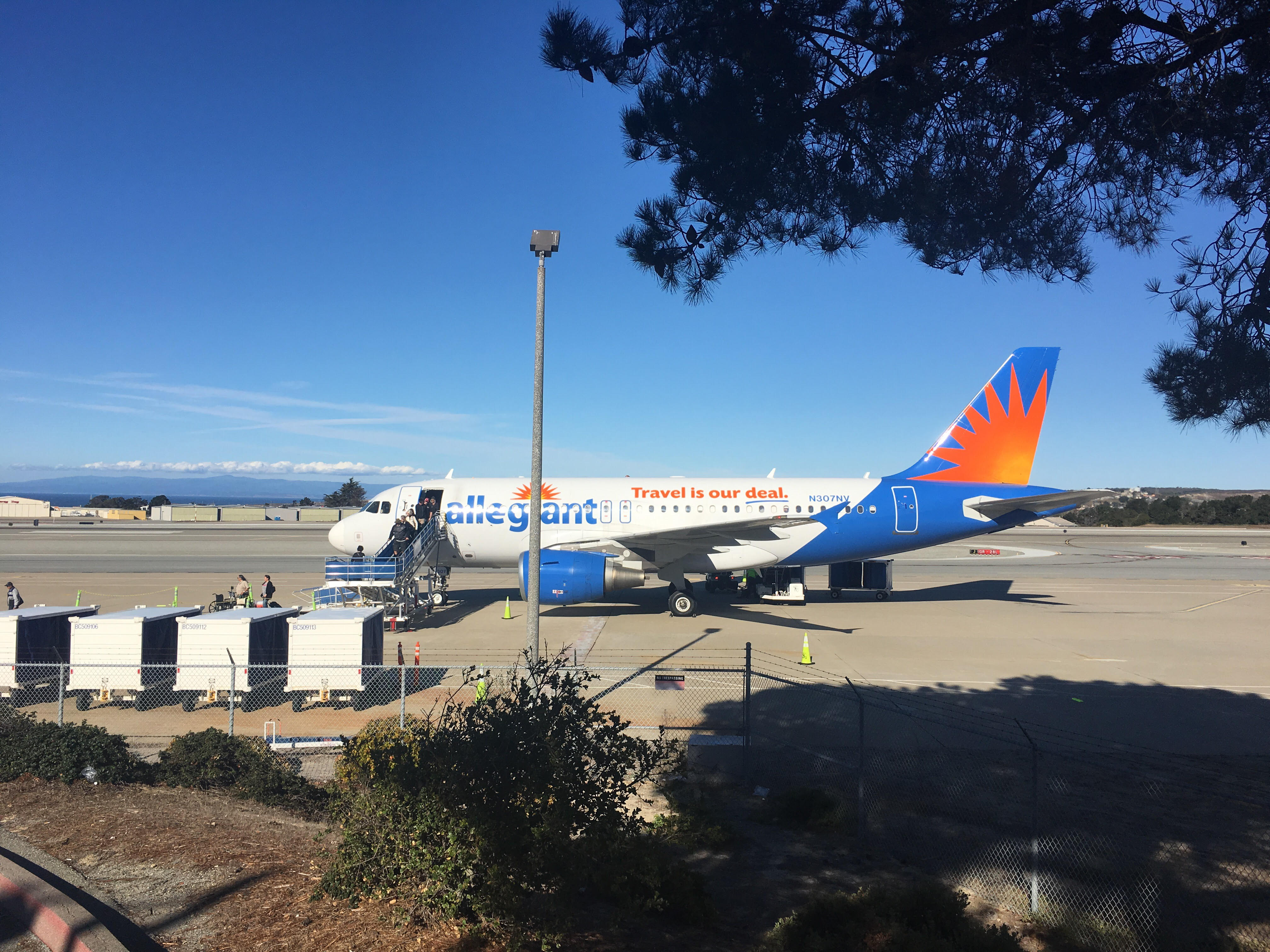
Allegiant Air A319 at Monterey Regional Airport

=== Top destinations ===
Busiest domestic routes from MRY (January 2025 – December 2025)
Rank	City	Passengers	Carriers
1	Phoenix, Arizona	86,650	American
2	Denver, Colorado	45,160	United
3	Los Angeles, California	44,590	United
4	Dallas/Fort Worth, Texas	43,650	American
5	San Diego, California	40,850	Alaska
6	San Francisco, California	31,500	United
7	Seattle, Washington	17,260	Alaska
8	Las Vegas, Nevada	11,880	Allegiant

=== Airline market share ===
Largest airlines at MRY (January 2025 – December 2025)
Rank	Airline	Passengers	Share
1	SkyWest Airlines	394,000	61.56%
2	American Airlines	129,000	20.09%
3	Envoy Air	57,990	9.05%
4	Horizon Air	35,610	5.56%
5	Allegiant Air	23,880	3.73%

=== Historical airline service ===
In 1933, Pacific Seaboard Air Lines scheduled passenger flights on single engine Bellanca CH-300s, two daily round trips involving Los Angeles, Santa Barbara, Santa Maria, San Luis Obispo, Paso Robles, Monterey, Salinas, San Jose, and San Francisco. Pacific Seaboard later moved its operation to the eastern U.S., was renamed Chicago and Southern Air Lines, and became a domestic and international airline that in 1953 was acquired by and merged into Delta Air Lines.

=== Past jet service ===
- United Airlines mainline flights served Monterey from the 1930s until 2001. In 1966, United Convair 340s flew nonstop to San Francisco (SFO) and direct to Los Angeles (LAX) via Santa Barbara. In 1969, all United flights at Monterey were operated with Boeing 727-100s and Boeing 737-200s nonstop to Los Angeles and San Francisco. United later operated Douglas DC-8s, Boeing 727-200s and 757-200s, and Airbus A320s to Monterey; the United DC-8 and 757 were the largest passenger aircraft ever scheduled to MRY. In 1979-81, United B727-100s flew nonstop to Chicago and Denver. In 1942, United Douglas DC-3s flew to Los Angeles, San Francisco and Santa Barbara.
- Pacific Air Lines: Boeing 727-100s. Pacific operated the first jets from Monterey in 1966, nonstop 727s to San Francisco and direct 727s to Los Angeles via Santa Barbara. The longest runway was then 5,000 feet.
- Hughes Airwest (formerly Air West): Douglas DC-9-10s and McDonnell Douglas DC-9-30s. In 1968, predecessor Air West Boeing 727-100s (formerly flown by Pacific Air Lines) flew nonstop to Los Angeles and direct to Las Vegas.
- Air California (predecessor of AirCal): Boeing 737-200s.
- Pacific Express: BAC One-Elevens.
- Pacific Southwest Airlines (PSA): Boeing 727-100s and 727-200s in the late 1970s followed by BAe 146-200s in the late 1980s.
- USAir (predecessor of US Airways): BAe 146-200s (formerly operated by Pacific Southwest Airlines).
- WestAir (operating as United Express): BAe 146-200s.
- America West Express (operated by Mesa Airlines): Canadair CRJ200s.
- ExpressJet (operating independently): Embraer ERJ-145s.

According to the Official Airline Guide (OAG), in late 1978. four airlines were operating daily nonstop jet service on the short hop from San Francisco International Airport (SFO) including Air California with Boeing 737-200s, Hughes Airwest with McDonnell Douglas DC-9-30s, Pacific Southwest Airlines (PSA) with Boeing 727-200s, and United Airlines with Boeing 737-200s. This same OAG also lists nonstop 737 jet service operated by United and nonstop 727 jet service operated by Pacific Southwest from the Los Angeles International Airport (LAX), nonstop 737 service operated by Air California from Ontario, CA (ONT), Orange County, CA (SNA). and Sacramento (SMF) as well as direct, no change of plane 737 jet service operated by United from Denver (DEN), Reno (RNO). and Salt Lake City (SLC) and also direct one-stop 737 service by Air California and direct one-stop 727 service by Pacific Southwest from San Diego (SAN).

Before starting 727 service, Pacific Air Lines served Monterey with Martin 4-0-4s followed by Fairchild F-27s. Predecessor Southwest Airways began serving Monterey in the late 1940s with Douglas DC-3s. Pacific Air Lines merged with Bonanza Air Lines and West Coast Airlines in 1968 to form Air West, which was renamed Hughes Airwest in 1970 after its acquisition by Howard Hughes.

== Golden Gate Airlines ==
Golden Gate Airlines was based in Monterey and served over 20 cities, primarily in California and also in Colorado, Idaho, Nevada and Utah. This regional air carrier operated a fleet of turboprop aircraft including Convair 580s, Fairchild Swearingen Metroliners, Fokker F27s, de Havilland Canada DHC-7 Dash 7s and Aerospatiale N 262s (Nord 262); their March 1, 1980 timetable claims over a thousand flights were being operated weekly. The airline ceased operations around 1981 after an unsuccessful merger with Swift Aire Lines which was based in San Luis Obispo, CA. In 1980-81 Golden Gate flew nonstop from Monterey to Fresno, Los Angeles, Sacramento, San Francisco, San Jose, Santa Barbara, and Reno.

== Regional and commuter airline service ==
Several other regional and commuter air carriers served Monterey in the 1980s and 1990s, primarily to Los Angeles and/or San Francisco. These included Apollo Airways and successor Pacific Coast Airlines, Mid Pacific Air operating as Reno Air Express (to San Jose), Sierra Expressway (to Oakland), SkyWest Airlines initially operating as Delta Connection and later as United Express, StatesWest Airlines operating as USAir Express, WestAir Commuter Airlines initially operating independently and later as United Express, and Wings West initially operating independently and later as American Eagle Airlines. Turboprops operated by these carriers included the Beechcraft 99, Beechcraft 1900C, BAe Jetstream 31, de Havilland Canada DHC-6 Twin Otter, Embraer EMB-120 Brasilia, Fairchild Swearingen Metroliner, Handley Page Jetstream, Saab 340, Short 330, and Short 360.

Mesa Airlines and SkyWest both operating as American Eagle and SkyWest also operating as United Express continue to serve Monterey with regional jet flights. Mesa Air operates Canadair CRJ-900s and SkyWest operates Canadair CRJ-200s and CRJ-700s. Horizon Air operating on behalf of Alaska Airlines serves the airport with Bombardier Q400s, the largest and fastest member of the de Havilland Canada DHC-8 Dash 8 family.

== Ground transportation ==
The airport is located along Olmstead Road just north of Highway 68 (Salinas Hwy). Highway 1 can be reached to the northwest via Highway 68. The airport provides both short-term and long-term parking facilities. Also, a premium parking lot is located directly in front of the terminal.

Monterey–Salinas Transit is the public ground transit organization that serves the airport. Taxi services for the airport are regulated by the Monterey County Regional Taxi Authority. The ridesharing services Lyft and Uber are also permitted to operate at the airport.

== Accidents and incidents ==
On June 14, 1964, at about 7:35 pm a Piper PA-28 (tail number N5384W) hit trees in Monterey, killing the 34-year-old student pilot. The investigation into the fatal accident revealed that the pilot misjudged his altitude, flying too low and under the influence of alcohol. The crash also caused the Piper to catch fire.

On August 17, 1968, at about 12:36 pm, a Cessna 210 (tail number N9676T) stalled while landing at the Monterey Peninsula Airport. During the landing, the 48-year-old pilot suffered a heart attack, which caused his Cessna to stall. The Cessna was destroyed upon impact. The pilot had about 5,743 flight hours of experience.

On July 26, 1979, at about 9:43 pm a Cessna 320A (tail number N3005R) crashed during its final approach to Monterey. The 62-year-old pilot used improper Instrument Flight Rules operations. The pilot had about 3,621 flight hours.

On August 23, 1984, at about 8:51 pm a Cessna 320C (tail number N7AE) departed from Monterey under Special Visual Flight Rules with a 58-year-old pilot and four passengers. At about 8:55 pm Air Traffic Control advised N7AE to turn left to avoid rising terrain. The Cessna was unable to avoid the terrain, crashed, and caught fire; all aboard died. The investigation revealed that the pilot made poor decisions and did not follow instructions from Air Traffic Control. The pilot had about 2,041 hours of flight experience.

On July 27, 1985, a Piper PA-28-235 (tail number N15548) took off from Monterey to practice holding patterns over Monterey Bay. About 12 minutes into the flight, the 60-year-old pilot radioed Air Traffic Control, "Mayday, rough engine." The Piper disappeared from Air Traffic Control's radar at about 1300 feet. Later the United States Coast Guard discovered pieces of the Piper in the ocean. The investigation revealed that the pilot used improper procedures. The pilot had about 1,923 hours of flight experience.

On July 24, 1987, a Piper PA-32R-301T (tail number N82793) was cleared for an Instrument Landing System approach when the 39-year-old pilot decided to conduct a go around procedure. About 30 seconds after initiating the procedure, the pilot radioed Air Traffic Control, "Seven niner three, in trouble." Sixteen seconds later another transmission is broadcast, "I have, I have an emergency back here." The Piper was seen making a 400-foot descent below assigned altitude and disappeared into Monterey Bay. A boater reported seeing the Piper "dive out" of a cloud and crash into the water. The investigation revealed that the pilot experienced spatial disorientation and lacked instrument flying time. The pilot had about 528 hours of flight experience.

On September 8, 1987, at about 5:50 pm, a Beechcraft 95 (tail number N845B), being flown by a 31-year-old student pilot, was conducting multi-engine training at Monterey. The pilot started practicing Instrument Landing System approaches. During an approach for a landing, the Beechcraft crashed into the ground. The investigation revealed that there was inadequate supervision during the training exercise. The pilot and student pilot were killed.

On June 24, 1992, a Cessna 421B (tail number N628RJ), the 40-year-old pilot and two passengers took off from Monterey. About three minutes after takeoff the Cessna collided with a hill about three miles east of the airport. The investigation revealed that ground fog and overconfidence in the pilot caused the accident. All three were killed. The pilot had about 75 hours of flight experience.

On August 7, 1997, at about 8:00 pm a Grumman American AA-5 (tail number N6086L) took off from Monterey. The Grumman was later found 18 miles south of the airport. It had crashed into the mountains which caused the Grumman to catch fire. The 31-year-old pilot had about 4,000 hours of flight experience.

On October 12, 1997, at about 5:28 pm a Rutan Long-EZ (tail number N555JD) being flown by musician and performer John Denver crashed into Monterey Bay near Pacific Grove. After taking off from Monterey the Long-EZ started its climb then descended into the bay. The investigation revealed that the collision was caused by the fuel valve selector being in an improper position. Inadequate flight planning also contributed to the collision. John Denver had about 2,750 hours of flight experience and was fatally injured in this accident.

On July 13, 2021, at around 10:42 am, a Cessna 421C (tail number N678SW), piloted by Mary Ellen Carlin crashed into a suburban residential area killing the pilot, passenger and a pet. Investigators found that the Cessna 421C diverged from its flight plan, resulting in a crash less than five minutes after departure.
