= Fort Worth International Airport =

Fort Worth International Airport may refer to:

- Fort Worth Meacham International Airport
- Dallas/Fort Worth International Airport
