= Bridgeport High School (Texas) =

Location
- 1 Maroon Dr. Bridgeport, Texas 76426-3999; United States

Information
- School type: Public high school
- School district: Bridgeport Independent School District
- Principal: Amber Gilbert
- Teaching staff: 47.42 (FTE)
- Grades: 9-12
- Enrollment: 653 (2023–2024)
- Student to teacher ratio: 13.77
- Colors: Maroon and white
- Athletics conference: UIL Class AAAA
- Nickname: Bulls and Sissies
- Yearbook: Stampede
- Website: Bridgeport High School

Bridgeport High School is a public high school located in the city of Bridgeport, Texas, United States. It is classified as a 4A school by the UIL. It is a part of the Bridgeport Independent School District located in west central Wise County. In 2015, the school was rated "Met Standard" by the Texas Education Agency.

== Athletics ==
The Bridgeport Bulls compete in the following sports:

- Baseball
- Basketball
- Cross country
- Football
- Golf
- Powerlifting
- Soccer
- Softball
- Tennis
- Track
- Volleyball

=== State Titles ===
- Boys Basketball
  - 2015 (4A)
- Boys Golf
  - 2024 (4A), 2025 (4A)
- Boys Soccer
  - 2026 (4A/D2)

==== State Finalists ====
- Boys Soccer
- 2016 (4A)

== Academics ==
- UIL Academic Meet Champions
  - 1995 (3A), 1996 (3A), 1997 (3A), 1998 (1A), 2000 (3A), 2001 (3A), 2003 (3A)
