= Parker County Airport =

Privately owned airport serving Weatherford, Texas, United States

- IATA: WEA; ICAO: KWEA; FAA LID: WEA

Summary
- Airport type: Public
- Owner: Parker County Airport Hangars Association
- Serves: Hudson Oaks, Texas; Weatherford, Texas
- Location: 3816 East Interstate 20, Hudson Oaks, Texas, 76087
- Elevation AMSL: 991.2 ft / 302.1 m
- Coordinates: 32°44′47″N 097°40′57″W

Map

Runways
| Direction | Length | | Surface |
| Direction | ft | m | Surface |
|---|---|---|---|
| 17/35 | 2,892 | 881 | Asphalt |

Statistics (2016)
- Aircraft operations: 25,240
- Based aircraft: 63
- Sources: Federal Aviation Administration except as noted

Parker County Airport (IATA: WEA, ICAO: KWEA, FAA LID: WEA) is a privately owned public airport in Hudson Oaks, Parker County, Texas, United States. The airport serves the city of Weatherford, and is located approximately 5 nautical miles (9.3 km) east of the central business district.

== Facilities ==
Parker County Airport covers 44 acres (18 ha) at an elevation of 991.2 feet (302.1 m) above mean sea level (AMSL), and has one runway:

- Runway 17/35: 2,892 x 40 ft. (881 x 12 m), Surface: Asphalt

Interstate 20, a major east–west highway, is directly north and oriented roughly perpendicular to the runway, with a 20 ft (6.1 m) tall uphill highway embankment at the approach end of runway 17 (downhill at the departure end of runway 35); the airport is officially closed to transient student traffic. Despite this rule, a student pilot was killed in 2001 when he overran runway 35 on landing and struck a semi-trailer truck traveling eastbound, resulting in the highway being closed for several hours. Additionally, two occupants of a Piper PA-22 Colt were seriously injured when the aircraft struck the embankment on approach to runway 17 in 1993.

For the 12-month period ending April 28, 2016, the airport had 25,240 aircraft operations, an average of 69 per day: 99% general aviation and less than 1% military. At that time there were 63 aircraft based at this airport: 94% single-engine and 6% multi-engine, with no jets, helicopters, ultralights, or gliders.

== Accidents and incidents ==
- May 17, 1993: A Piper PA-22-108 Colt, registration number N4924Z, lost engine power on final approach to land on runway 17. The aircraft's nose struck an embankment only 5 feet (1.5 m) short of the runway, causing substantial aircraft damage; both aircraft occupants suffered serious injuries. The accident was attributed to "[The] total loss of engine power with cause undetermined. A factor was the lack of suitable terrain."
- August 21, 1999: A Piper PA-28-180 Cherokee, registration number N8981J, lost engine power immediately on takeoff from runway 17. The aircraft struck trees and a retaining wall during the subsequent off-airport forced landing, suffering substantial damage; one aircraft occupant suffered serious injuries and the other occupant suffered minor injuries. The accident was attributed to "The loss of engine power during the initial takeoff climb for an undetermined reason. A factor was the lack of suitable terrain for the forced landing."
- July 16, 2001: In a rare case of airplane theft, two men stole a Piper PA-28-180 Cherokee from Parker County Airport, but crashed while attempting to land at Bridgeport Municipal Airport a short time later, suffering serious injuries. Hudson Oaks police speculated that the men intended to refuel the aircraft in Bridgeport before flying it to Oklahoma. Neither of the thieves had ever held a pilot certificate, but the man who acted as pilot reportedly had 6 hours of prior flight time. (Note: The circumstances of the man's prior flight time is not made clear in the NTSB accident report, but it is likely that he had taken the controls while a certificated pilot or a flight instructor was in the airplane acting as pilot-in-command.)
- August 22, 2001: A Cessna 152, registration number N4755B, overran runway 35 after a downwind landing, coasting into the main lanes of adjacent Interstate 20 and striking a semi-trailer truck traveling eastbound at 60 miles per hour (97 km/h). The aircraft was destroyed and the pilot, who was the sole occupant, was killed. The student pilot, returning to Fort Worth Meacham International Airport after a solo instructional flight, reported to air traffic control that he was lost and low on fuel; he then initiated a landing at Parker County Airport to refuel. After bouncing several times during a landing attempt on runway 17, the pilot took off, turned 180°, and landed downwind on the same runway (numbered 35 in the opposite direction). Witnesses report that no apparent attempts were made to apply brakes or takeoff power before the craft coasted off the north end of the runway and down an embankment. The accident was attributed to "The student pilot's improper decision making in that he landed with a tailwind and failed to execute a go-around, which resulted in a runway overrun. Contributing factors were the inaccurate reading of the left fuel gage as a result of improper maintenance by the operator/maintenance personnel, and the tailwind condition." The truck driver was not injured, but the interstate was closed to traffic for several hours.
- January 15, 2004: A Beech B36TC Bonanza, registration number N7252X, crashed in an open field in Willow Park, Texas, while on approach to land at Parker County Airport in instrument meteorological conditions. The aircraft was destroyed and the pilot, who was the sole occupant, was killed. The accident was attributed to "The pilot's failure to maintain aircraft control while maneuvering. Contributing factors were the dark night and rain."
- July 19, 2016: A Cessna 182J Skylane, registration number N2644F, suffered an electrical failure and then lost engine power immediately after takeoff from runway 17 and collided with a fence and trees during the subsequent off-airport forced landing. The aircraft suffered substantial damage; one passenger suffered serious injuries, while the pilot and another passenger suffered minor injuries. The accident was attributed to "An electrical system malfunction for reasons that could not be determined, and the subsequent loss of engine power due to the loss of the electrical boost pumps. Also causal was the pilot's improper emergency action following the loss of engine power due to his lack of knowledge regarding the engine's supercharger system."
- October 30, 2021: All five occupants of a Cessna 177 were hospitalized after the aircraft lost engine power on approach, struck utility lines, and crashed on the shoulder of Interstate 20. The cause of the accident is under investigation.

== See also ==
- List of airports in Texas
