= Reno Air =

Airline of the United States (1990–1999)

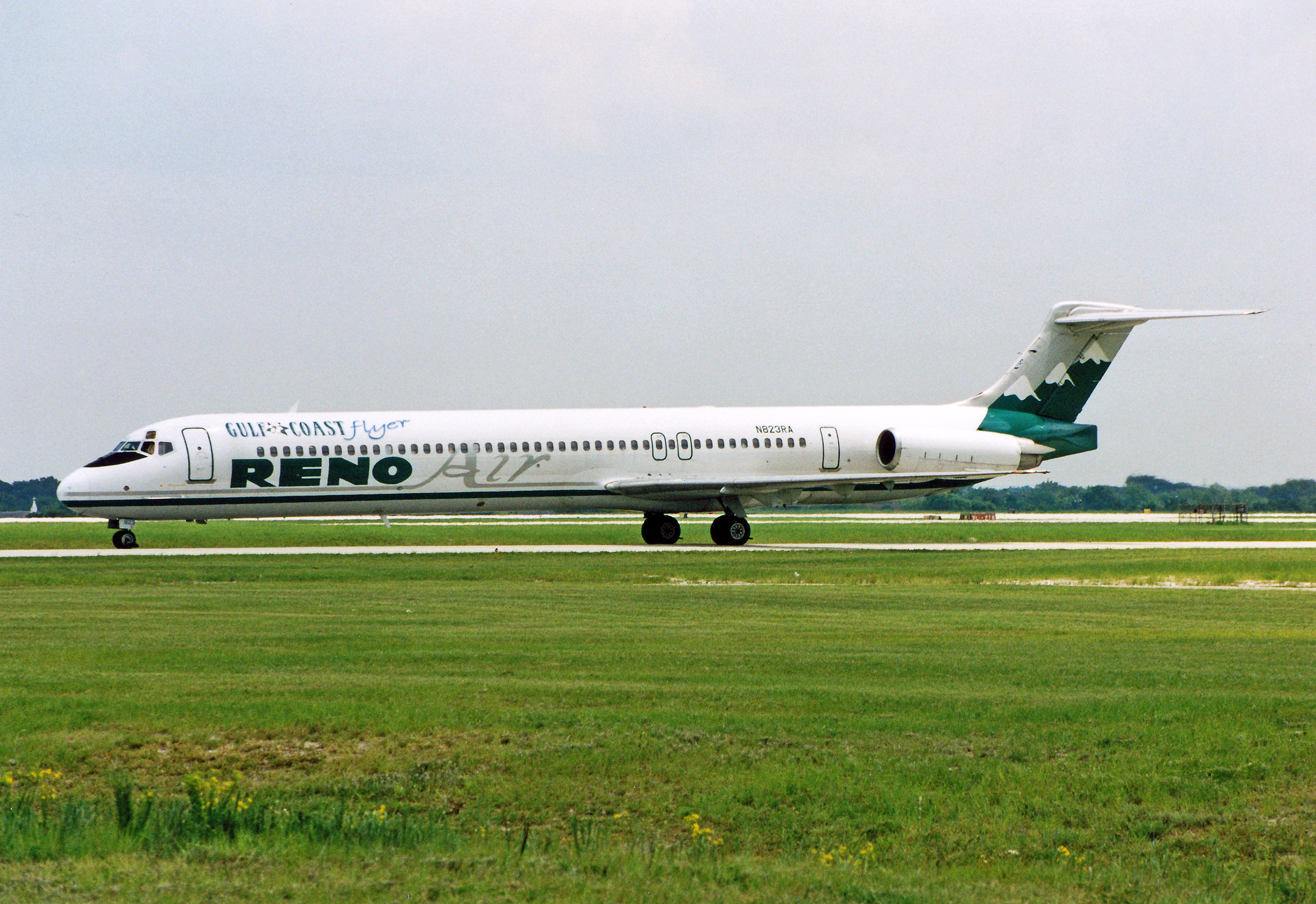
- Reno Air McDonnell Douglas MD-82 at Orlando Sanford International Airport
IATA	ICAO	Call sign
QQ	ROA	RENO AIR
- Founded: June 11, 1990; 36 years ago
- Commenced operations: July 1, 1992; 34 years ago
- Ceased operations: August 31, 1999; 27 years ago (merged into American Airlines)
- Hubs: Las Vegas; Reno/Tahoe; San Jose (CA)
- Frequent-flyer program: QQuick Miles
- Parent company: AMR Corporation
- Headquarters: Reno, Nevada
- Key people: Joe O'Gorman
- Website: renoair.com (now aa.com)

Reno Air was a scheduled passenger airline headquartered in Reno, Nevada, United States. Reno Air provided service from its hubs at Reno/Tahoe International Airport in Reno, Nevada, San Jose International Airport in San Jose, California and Las Vegas International Airport in Las Vegas, Nevada to destinations throughout the western United States, including Alaska. International service to Vancouver, British Columbia in western Canada was also served at one point and limited service was operated to the midwestern U.S. as well. A small stand alone operation was also undertaken at one point in the southeastern U.S. with the service being based in Gulfport, Mississippi. American Airlines acquired Reno Air in 1999.

== History ==
Reno Air was founded in June 1990 by Frontier Airlines alumnus Joseph Lorenzo and Midway Airlines executive Jeff Erickson. The airline's first flight was on July 1, 1992, with nonstop jet service from Reno (RNO) to Seattle-Tacoma International Airport (SEA). By April 1993, Reno Air served the following destinations from its Reno hub with nonstop jet flights: Los Angeles (LAX), Kansas City (MCI), Minneapolis/St. Paul (MSP), Ontario, CA (ONT), Portland, OR (PDX), San Diego (SAN), San Francisco (SFO) and Seattle (SEA).

Following the development of its Reno hub, the airline established a second hub at San Jose International Airport (SJC) in late 1993 by leasing gate space from American Airlines. According to its December 15, 1993 system route map, the airline operated nonstop flights from San Jose to Burbank, CA (BUR), Las Vegas (LAS), Los Angeles (LAX), Ontario, CA (ONT), Phoenix (PHX), Portland, OR (PDX), Reno (RNO) and Seattle (SEA). In addition to operating jet service from its new San Jose hub, Reno Air also entered into a code sharing agreement with Mid Pacific Air to operate connecting passenger feeder service as Reno Air Express flown with British Aerospace BAe Jetstream 31 commuter turboprops with service to Chico, CA, (CIC), Eureka, CA (ACV), Klamath Falls, OR (LMT), Medford, OR (MFR), Monterey, CA (MRY), Redding, CA (RDD) and Santa Rosa, CA (STS). Meantime, American Airlines had earlier expanded its presence in the San Jose market in northern California with its purchase of AirCal (formerly Air California) several years earlier but was experiencing stiff competition from Southwest Airlines concerning air fares and desired to outsource the SJC operation to a lower cost operator. At the same time, Reno Air joined American's AAdvantage program thus allowing AAdvantage members to earn credit by flying on Reno Air. Reno Air subsequently posted its first annual profit in 1995.

While the airline flew most of its routes on the U.S. West Coast from its three hubs, Reno Air also operated a separate stand alone route system based in Gulfport, Mississippi (GPT). The Mississippi airport on the coast of the Gulf of Mexico, which serves the local gambling casino industry, was linked with nonstop flights to St. Petersburg via St. Petersburg-Clearwater International Airport (PIE) and Orlando via Sanford International Airport (SFB) in Florida, and also to Atlanta, Georgia (ATL). Atlanta was the only city of these four destinations that was linked to the rest of the Reno Air route system and then only briefly in 1997. These Reno Air flights were operated as scheduled passenger services between GPT and PIE, SFB and ATL and thus were not charter flights. As can be seen in the above photo of the Reno Air MD-82 jetliner at Orlando Sanford International Airport, the airline's aircraft serving Gulfport had "Gulf Coast Flyer" as part of the livery.

In 1996, Reno Air adopted a new strategy to focus on the Los Angeles (LAX), Las Vegas (LAS), and Seattle (SEA) markets. It opened a Seattle base in 1996 to serve its Alaska flights, as well as reservations center in Las Vegas in 1997, and offered 25 nonstop flights a day via a small hub operation at LAS by 1998.

In February 1999, American Airlines purchased Reno Air. Reno Air and flew its last flight on Aug. 30 of that year. At the time, the purchase was seen as a way to feed American's east–west route network with Reno Air's north–south flights, primarily through San Jose. American initially retained the former Reno Air aircraft and repainted them into a modified version of the American Airlines color scheme (with a white fuselage instead of an unpainted one), but disposed of the entire Reno Air fleet in 2001 as part of capacity reduction efforts following the 9/11 attacks. By the end of 2001 (especially after 9/11) the original Reno Air route system structure had ceased to exist with American Airlines downgrading Reno to a spoke city rather than a connecting hub. At around 2000-2002 Reno Air was known as “The Little Airline that Could.”

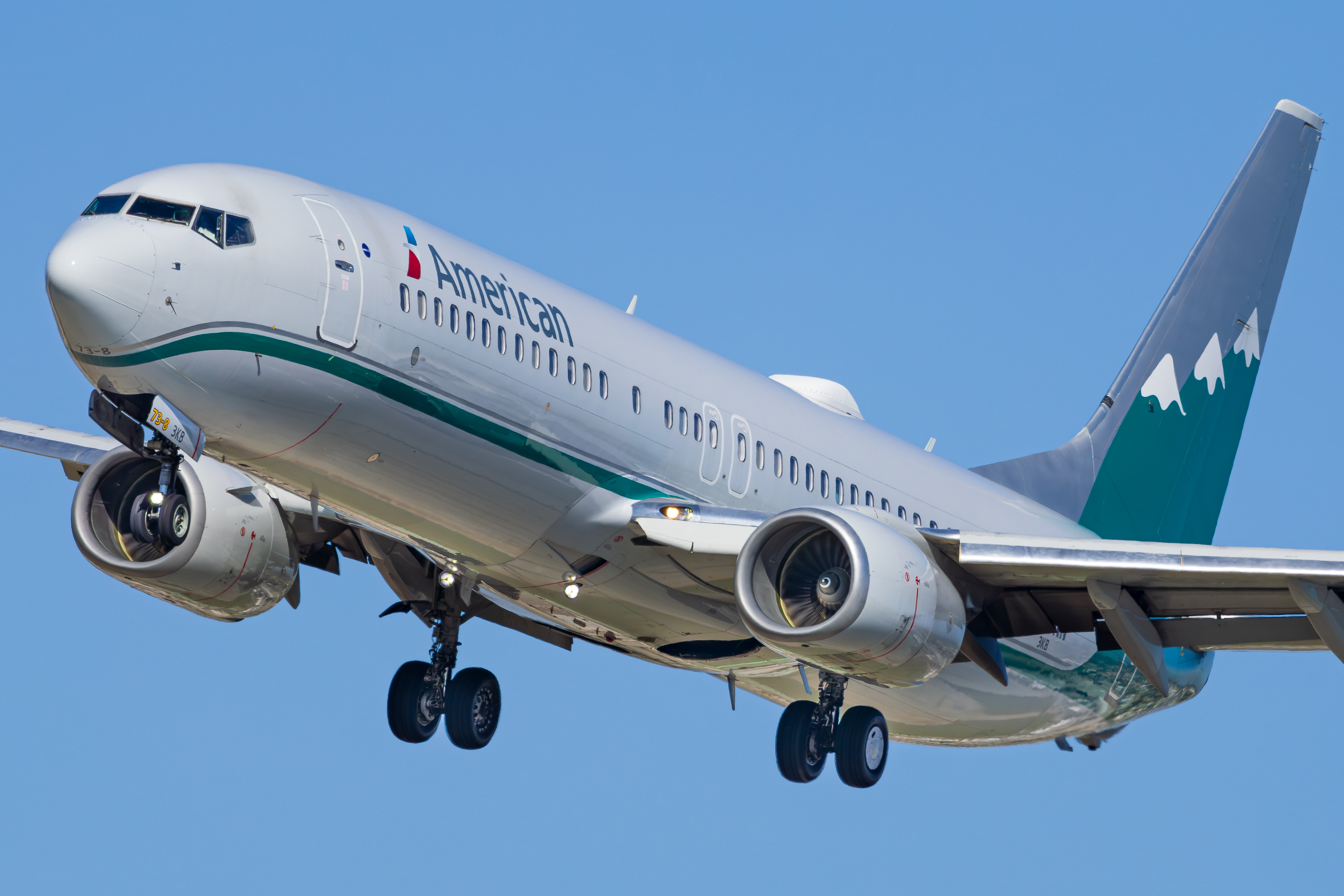
The American Airlines Boeing 737-800 painted in Reno Air heritage colours, N916NN, landing at Los Angeles International Airport in 2023

In 2015 American Airlines added to its heritage livery series a Reno Air Boeing 737-800 (although Reno Air never operated 737 aircraft).

== Fleet ==
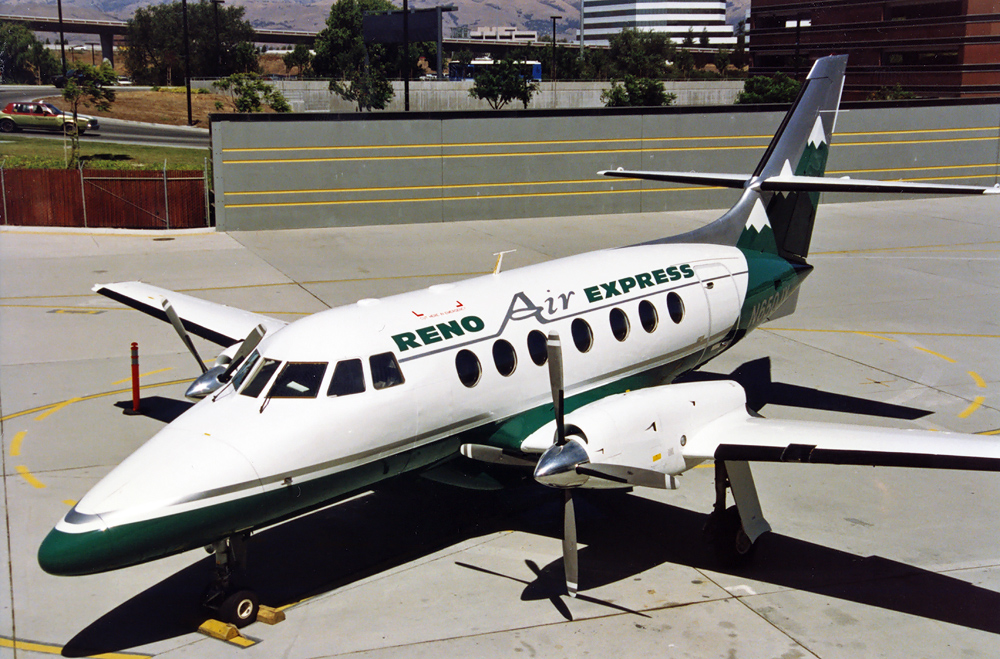
British Aerospace Jetstream 31 in Reno Air Express colors

Reno Air's fleet consisted of McDonnell Douglas MD-80 series (MD-81, MD-82, MD-83 and MD-87 models) and McDonnell Douglas MD-90 aircraft. In addition, British Aerospace Jetstream 31 19-seat turboprop aircraft were operated as Reno Air Express by Mid Pacific Air under a code sharing passenger feeder agreement.

== Destinations in May 1999 ==
Shortly after its acquisition by American Airlines, in May 1999 Reno Air was continuing to operate as an independent airline and was serving the following thirteen (13) destinations with McDonnell Douglas MD-80, MD-87 and MD-90 jetliners according to its system route map:

- Anchorage, Alaska (ANC)
- Chicago, Illinois (ORD)
- Colorado Springs, Colorado (COS)
- Las Vegas, Nevada (LAS) - Hub
- Los Angeles, California (LAX) - Focus city
- Oklahoma City, Oklahoma (OKC)
- Orange County, California (SNA) - now John Wayne Airport
- Portland, Oregon (PDX)
- Reno, Nevada (RNO) - Hub
- San Diego, California (SAN)
- San Francisco, California (SFO)
- San Jose, California (SJC) - Hub
- Seattle, Washington (SEA)

Also at this same time, the Reno Air system timetable dated May 1, 1999 listed connecting flights operated by American Eagle with Saab 340 regional propjet aircraft to the following destinations with connections being made at Los Angeles International Airport (LAX) which was a focus city for Reno Air at this time:

- Bakersfield, California (BFL)
- Carlsbad, California (CLD)
- Fresno, California (FAT)
- Monterey, California (MRY)
- Palm Springs, California (PSP)
- San Luis Obispo, California (SBP)
- Santa Barbara, California (SBA)

== Former destinations ==
According to its system route maps over the years, Reno Air operated scheduled passenger jet service to the following destinations at various times during its existence:

- Albuquerque, New Mexico (ABQ)
- Atlanta, Georgia (ATL)
- Bullhead City, Arizona (IFP)
- Burbank, California (BUR) - now Bob Hope Airport
- Denver, Colorado (DEN)
- Detroit, Michigan (DTW)
- Durango, Colorado (DRO)
- Fairbanks, Alaska (FAI)
- Gulfport, Mississippi (GPT)
- Lake Tahoe, California (TVL)
- Laughlin, Nevada via Laughlin/Bullhead International Airport in Arizona (IFP)
- Minneapolis/St. Paul, Minnesota (MSP)
- Ontario, California (ONT)
- Orlando, Florida via Sanford International Airport (SFB)
- Palm Springs, California (PSP)
- Phoenix, Arizona (PHX)
- Redmond, Oregon (RDM)
- St. Petersburg, Florida via St. Petersburg-Clearwater International Airport (PIE) (Tampa, Florida was served via PIE)
- Tucson, Arizona (TUS)
- Vancouver, British Columbia, Canada (YVR) - only international destination served by the airline

1997 Pittsburgh to Orlando (charters)

== Accidents and incidents ==
- Reno Air Flight 153 partially lost power in its engines on Friday, 14 March 1997 from Detroit, MI to Reno, NV.

== See also ==
- List of defunct airlines of the United States
