= St. John the Baptizer Catholic Church =

American Roman catholic church

Coordinates: 33.2156°N 97.7487°W

- St. John the Baptizer Catholic Church
- Location: 1801 Irvin St, Bridgeport TX 76426
- Country: United States
- Denomination: Roman Catholicism
- Website: https://www.jbdcatholics.org/st--john-the-baptizer-bridgeport

History
- Founded: 1926

St. John the Baptizer Catholic Church is a Catholic Church of the parish of the Roman Catholic Diocese of Fort Worth, Texas, United States. It is the first Catholic church in Bridgeport, Texas, the current building dates back to 1926, however a congregation was established in 1908.

== History ==
During the 1890s, Mass was held in Bridgeport by Rev. J.J. O'Riordan once a month, when he travelled by train from Henrietta, Texas. O'Riordan served under Bishop Brennan, the first bishop of Dallas. The Church became the first Catholic Church in Wise County. Until funds could be collected, Mass was held in individual houses. A small wooden church was then constructed in 1908 on Greathouse Street. The church was renovated in 1926, and a new church was constructed on October 1, 1967, and the church became part of the new Diocese of Fort Worth.

The Church was recognized by Pope John Paul II on October 1, 1989, for serving the parishioners for 100 years, Pope Francis recognized the church in October 2014 on its 125th anniversary.
