= Bridgeport Independent School District =

School district in Texas, United States

Location
- 2107 15th St. Bridgeport, Texas ESC Region 11 USA
- Coordinates: 33°13′15″N 97°45′7″W

District information
- Type: Independent school district
- Grades: Pre-K through 12
- Superintendent: Amy Ellis
- Schools: 5 (2015-2016)
- NCES District ID: 4811340

Students and staff
- Students: 2,293 (2010-11)
- Teachers: 178.35 (2009-10) (on full-time equivalent (FTE) basis)
- Student–teacher ratio: 12.66 (2009-10)
- Athletic conference: UIL Class AAAA
- District mascot: Bulls
- Colors: Maroon and white

Other information
- TEA District Accountability Rating for 2015-16: Met Standard
- Website: Bridgeport ISD

Bridgeport Independent School District is a public school district based in Bridgeport, Texas, United States. In addition to Bridgeport, the district also serves the cities of Lake Bridgeport and Runaway Bay. The district operates one high school, Bridgeport High School.

== Finances ==
As of the 2010-2011 school year, the appraised valuation of property in the district was $1,226,863,000. The maintenance tax rate was $0.104 and the bond tax rate was $0.023 per $100 of appraised valuation.

== Academic achievement ==
From 2004 to 2011, the school district was rated "academically acceptable" by the Texas Education Agency. About 49% of districts in Texas in 2011 received this rating. No state accountability ratings will be given to districts in 2012. A school district in Texas can receive one of four possible rankings from the Texas Education Agency: Exemplary (the highest possible ranking), recognized, academically acceptable, and academically unacceptable (the lowest possible ranking).

== Schools ==
In the 2011-2012 school year, the district had students in five schools.

=== Regular instructional ===
- Bridgeport High School (grades 9-12)
- Bridgeport Middle (grades 6-8)
- Bridgeport Intermediate (grades 3-5)
- Bridgeport Elementary (grades PK-2)

=== Alternative instructional ===
- Wise County Special Education Coop (grades PK-12)

== See also ==
- List of school districts in Texas
- List of high schools in Texas
