= American Airways Hangar and Administration Building =

- U.S. National Register of Historic Places
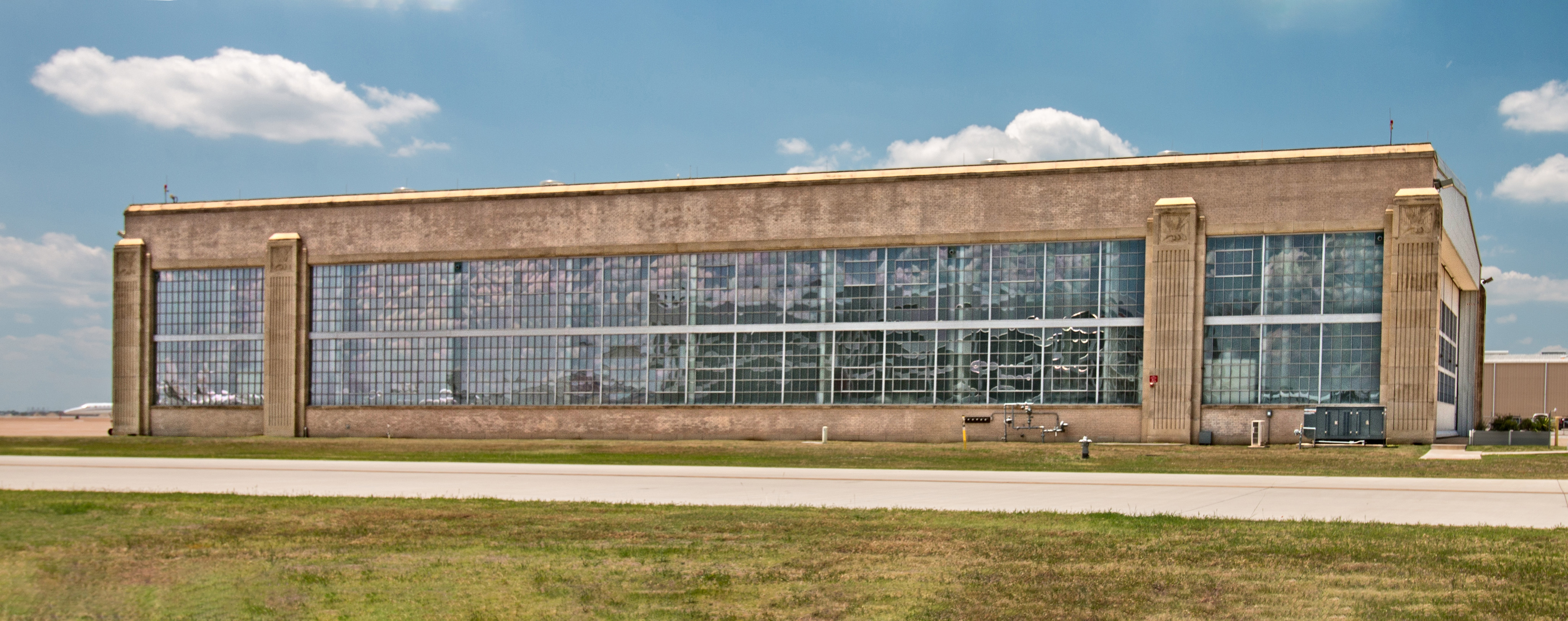
- American Airways Building in 2018

- Location within Texas Location within the United States
- Location: 201 Aviation Wy., Fort Worth, Texas
- Coordinates: 32°49′18″N 97°21′21″W
- Area: less than one acre
- Built: 1933
- Built by: Thomas S. Byrne, Inc.
- Architect: A. Epstein
- Architectural style: Moderne
- NRHP reference No.: 08000317
- Added to NRHP: April 16, 2008

The American Airways Hangar and Administration Building is located on the grounds of Fort Worth Meacham International Airport in Fort Worth, Texas. The hangar and office opened in 1933 and cost $150,000 to construct. The two-story building measures 235 feet by 120 feet and is constructed of brick, steel and reinforced concrete. The hangar was designed by Russian-born architect Abraham Epstein.

It is the oldest building of Meacham Field. The southern, hangar portion is about two-thirds of the building; the two-story brick administration building portion makes up about one-third, on the north. It has fluted cast stone pilasters, which include the American Airlines eagle in bas-relief capitals. The eagle appears above "American Airways" written in cast stone at the middle of the administration building.

It was added to the National Register of Historic Places on April 16, 2008.

== See also ==
- National Register of Historic Places listings in Tarrant County, Texas
