= Mid Pacific Air =

Hawaii low-fare airline

IATA	ICAO	Call sign
HO	MPA	MID PAC
- Founded: 1981; 45 years ago
- Ceased operations: 1995; 31 years ago
- Hubs: Honolulu International Airport; Indianapolis International Airport
- Headquarters: Honolulu, Hawaii, US; Indianapolis, Indiana, US

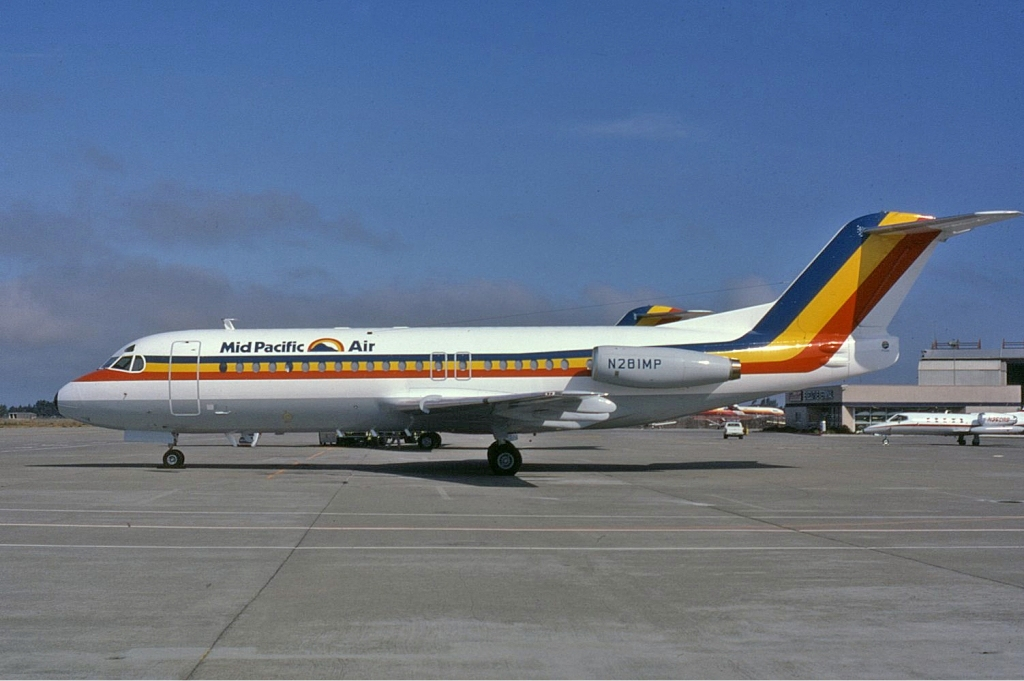
Mid Pacific Air Fokker F28-4000. This aircraft crashed while operating with Korean Air

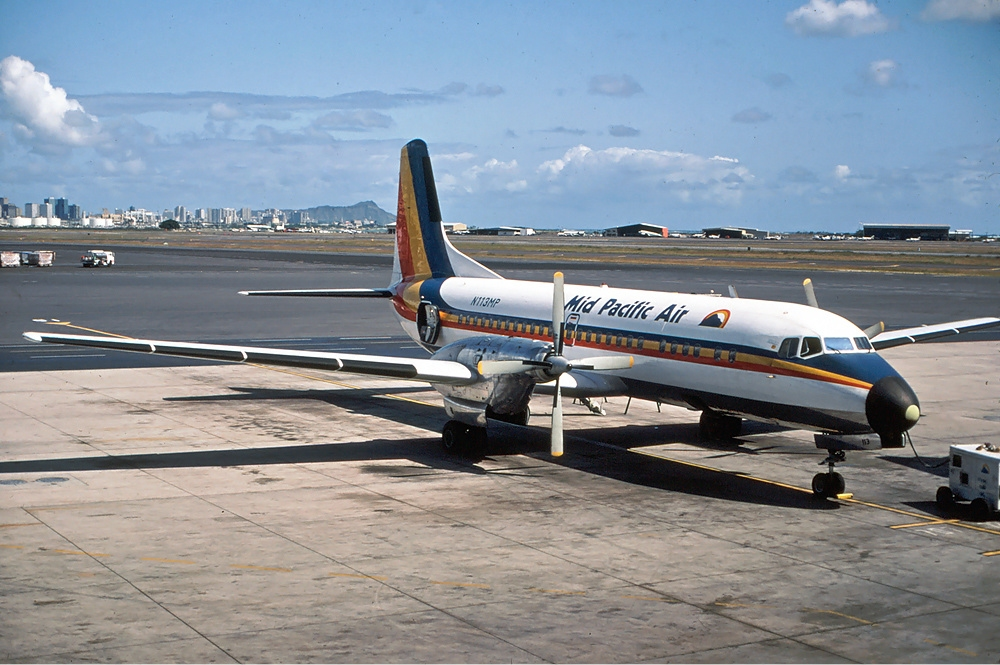
Mid Pacific Air NAMC YS-11A-659

Mid Pacific Air was a low-cost regional airline which began operations with passenger services in Hawaii. Founded in 1981, initial routes connected the islands of Kauai, O'ahu, Maui and Hawaii (the Big Island). Its primary competitors were established air carriers Hawaiian Airlines and Aloha Airlines. When it operated in the Midwest, its headquarters were on the grounds of Indianapolis International Airport in Indianapolis, Indiana. Originally its headquarters were located at Honolulu International Airport.

== History ==
In contrast to Hawaiian and Aloha, Mid Pacific Air's fleet was made up primarily of NAMC YS-11 turboprop planes; Hawaiian and Aloha operated jet aircraft such as the McDonnell Douglas DC-9 (Hawaiian) and Boeing 737 (Aloha) on the same interisland routes. Mid Pacific added Fokker F28 Fellowship twin jets in 1985. In October 1982, the airline wet leased a Boeing 707 from Arrow Air and operated a short lived service from Honolulu to Pago Pago, American Samoa using the name Mid Pacific Arrow. In 1984, Mid Pacific leased four of its YS-11's to Fort Worth Airlines in Texas, and in February 1985 it became one of that airline's largest shareholders. That same month, the airline expanded to the southwestern United States, where it operated low-fare service between from Las Vegas, Nevada and the Grand Canyon to Burbank and Orange County, California, and also flew nonstop between Orange County and Fresno, California. In January 1986, Mid Pacific was sold to KOA Holdings, and shortly thereafter the F28 jets were removed from service.

Although Mid Pacific was able to lure customers with low fares and promotions that compensated for the slower, noisier turboprop aircraft, the airline was unable to compete with Hawaiian and Aloha and ended passenger flights in Hawaii on January 19, 1988, and ended cargo flights there a month later.

Following the termination of the Hawaii operation, Mid Pacific moved to the midwestern United States and operated all cargo freighter flights using the YS-11s from a base in Lafayette, Indiana, and in the 1990s operated commuter service via a code sharing agreement with Reno Air under the name Reno Air Express using British Aerospace BAe Jetstream 31 turboprop aircraft. These Reno Air Express flights provided connecting passenger feeder service at the Reno Air hub located at the San Jose International Airport (SJC) in northern California. In 1992 and 1993, the airline operated a British Aerospace BAe 146 jet in cargo freighter service on behalf of TNT between New York City and Bermuda. The airline ceased operations in 1995.

== Mid Pacific Air destinations in 1986 ==
=== Hawaii ===
According to its system route map dated January 15, 1986, Mid Pacific was serving the following destinations in Hawaii with Fokker F28 Fellowship twin jets and NAMC YS-11 turboprops:

- Hilo, Hawaii (ITO)
- Honolulu, Oahu (HNL) – original main base and headquarters
- Kahului, Maui (OGG)
- Kona, Hawaii (KOA)
- Lihue, Kauai (LIH)

=== California & Nevada ===
According to its system route map dated January 15, 1986, Mid Pacific was serving the following destinations in California and Nevada with NAMC YS-11 turboprops:

- Burbank, California (BUR) – now Bob Hope Airport
- Fresno, California (FAT)
- Las Vegas, Nevada (LAS)
- Santa Ana, California via Orange County Airport (SNA) – now John Wayne Airport

== Reno Air Express destinations in 1995 ==
According to its system route map dated January 3, 1995, Mid Pacific was serving the following destinations in California and Oregon with British Aerospace BAe Jetstream 31 propjets operating as Reno Air Express via a code sharing agreement with Reno Air:

- Chico, California (CIC)
- Eureka, California via the Arcata-Eureka Airport (ACV)
- Klamath Falls, Oregon (LMT)
- Medford, Oregon (MFR)
- Monterey, California (MRY)
- Redding, California (RDD)
- San Jose, California (SJC) – Hub (also a connecting hub for Reno Air)
- Santa Rosa, California (STS)

== Fleet ==
- 22 NAMC YS-11 – primary aircraft type in fleet
- 2 Fokker F28 Fellowship
- Boeing 707 – operated by Mid Pacific Arrow
- 1 British Aerospace BAe 146 – operated in cargo freighter service for TNT
- 9 British Aerospace BAe Jetstream 31 – operated via a code share agreement in feeder services as Reno Air Express for Reno Air

== See also ==
- List of defunct airlines of the United States
