= Fort Worth Airlines =

IATA	ICAO	Call sign
—	FTW	FORT WORTH AIR
- Founded: 1984; 41 years ago
- Commenced operations: December 14, 1984; 40 years ago
- Ceased operations: September 22, 1985; 40 years ago
- Hubs: Fort Worth Meacham International Airport
- Fleet size: 4
- Destinations: 8
- Headquarters: Meacham Field; Fort Worth, Texas
- Key people: Thomas B. King; Sheldon Srulevitch
- Employees: 150

Fort Worth Airlines was a low-fare airline headquartered at Meacham Field in Fort Worth, Texas, United States. It was founded and largely operated by former executives from recently dissolved Texas-based Braniff International Airways. Flights between Fort Worth and three Texas cities commenced in December 1984 and additional Oklahoma and Texas destinations were added in 1985; however, the airline was unable to operate profitably, and it ceased operations and filed for bankruptcy in September of that year.

== History ==
Fort Worth Airlines was founded by Thomas B. King, a former vice president of Braniff International. Fort Worth Airlines was the first federally certificated interstate carrier based at Meacham Field in more than 30 years. Local news reports remarked on the airline's strong ties to Braniff: two-thirds of the airline's executives came from Braniff, its office furniture was bought at Braniff's liquidation sale, and walls were decorated with original artwork by Alexander Calder, who had previously done design work for Braniff. The airline used turboprop-powered 56-seat NAMC YS-11 aircraft leased from Mid-Pacific Air, claiming that larger jetliners could not support the frequency of flights that the carrier wanted to offer.

Flights to Austin, San Antonio, and William P. Hobby Airport in Houston began on 14 December 1984. In February 1985, Mid Pacific Air became one of the airlines' largest shareholders, and it was announced that Fort Worth flights to Houston Intercontinental Airport would begin in April. In June 1985, an interline ticketing arrangement with Continental Airlines was signed and by September the airline had become a Continental Commuter feeder carrier on the Fort Worth to Houston route. Fort Worth Airlines began flights to Oklahoma City and Tulsa in August 1985 and announced that flights to Abilene, Texas would begin the following month.

On 22 September 1985, Fort Worth Airlines halted flights and filed for Chapter 11 bankruptcy, claiming that ticket revenues were not covering operating costs and that it had run out of cash. The carrier had per-seat costs 61 percent higher than Southwest Airlines, which offered comparable low-fare flights to the same destinations from nearby Dallas Love Field. The airline's board had forced Thomas King to resign as president and CEO nine days earlier due to the carrier's poor financial performance; he was replaced by Sheldon Srulevitch, and most of the airline's 150 employees were laid off immediately.

== Destinations ==
Fort Worth Airlines served the following destinations during its existence:

- Abilene, Texas: Abilene Regional Airport (ABI)
- Austin: Robert Mueller Municipal Airport (AUS)
- Fort Worth: Meacham Field (FTW) - airline headquarters and hub
- Houston:
  - Houston Intercontinental Airport (IAH)
  - William P. Hobby Airport (HOU)
- Oklahoma City: Will Rogers World Airport (OKC)
- San Antonio: San Antonio International Airport (SAT)
- Tulsa: Tulsa International Airport (TUL)

== Fleet ==
- 4 × NAMC YS-11, leased from Mid Pacific Air, which provided technical support for the aircraft

== See also ==
- List of defunct airlines of the United States
