= Bridgeport, Texas =

- City
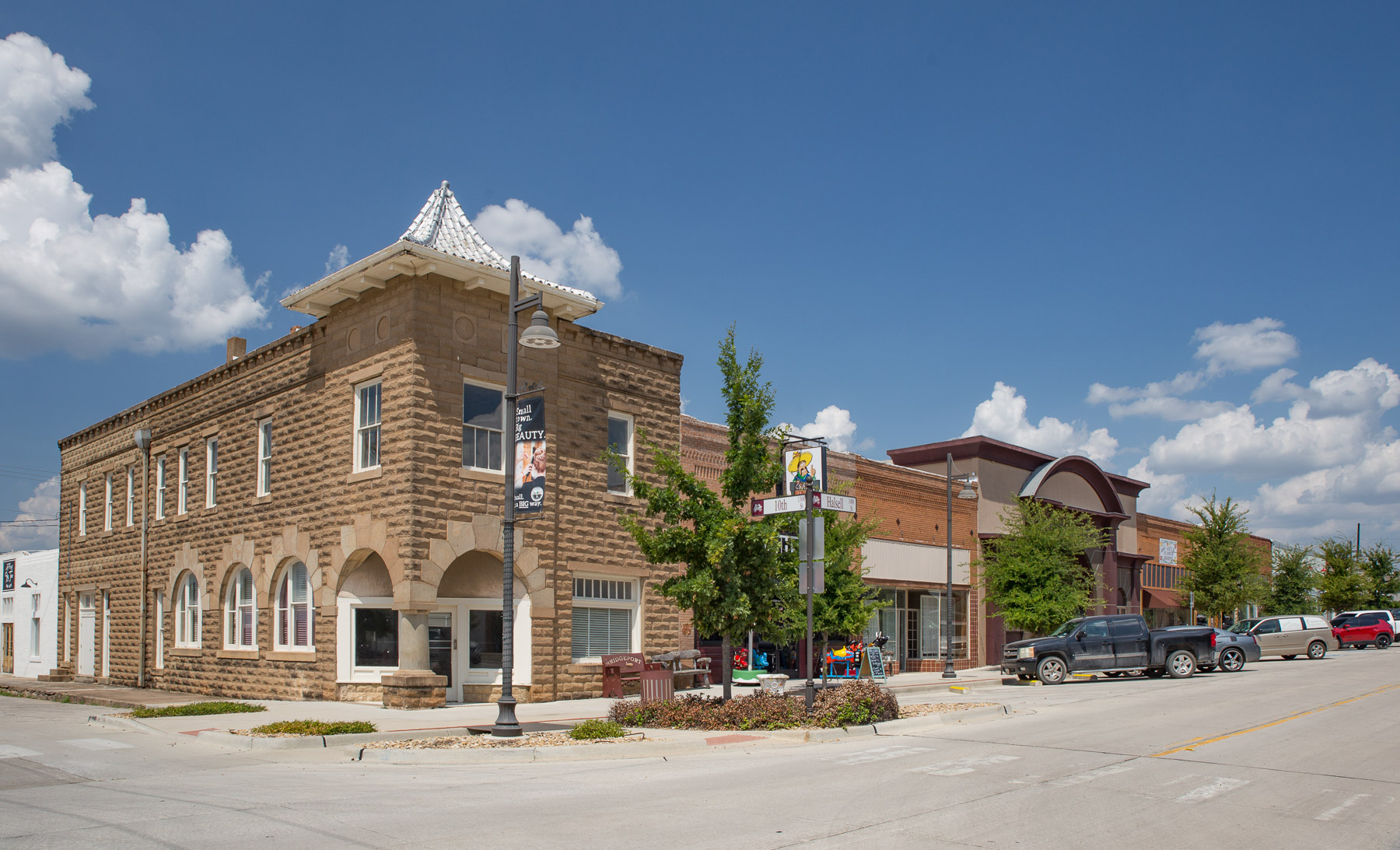
- Downtown Bridgeport
- Interactive map of Bridgeport, Texas
- Coordinates: 33°12′38″N 97°46′17″W
- Country: United States
- State: Texas
- County: Wise

Area
  - Total: 7.85 sq mi (20.32 km^{2})
  - Land: 7.84 sq mi (20.31 km^{2})
  - Water: 0.0039 sq mi (0.01 km^{2})
- Elevation: 768 ft (234 m)

Population (2020)
  - Total: 5,923
  - Density: 755.3/sq mi (291.6/km^{2})
- Time zone: UTC-6 (Central (CST))
  - Summer (DST): UTC-5 (CDT)
- ZIP code: 76426
- Area code: 940
- FIPS code: 48-10264
- GNIS feature ID: 2409907
- Website: www.cityofbridgeport.net

Bridgeport is a city in Wise County, Texas, United States. The population was 5,923 in 2020. In 2009, Bridgeport was named by the Texas Legislature as the Stagecoach Capital of Texas.

== History ==
Bridgeport's history began in February 1860 when William H. Hunt was granted a charter from the West Fork Bridge Company to build a bridge across the West Fork of the Trinity River. The bridge was located approximately one mile southwest of the present townsite. A Texas State Historical Marker alongside Farm To Market Road 920 denotes the spot of the original bridge today.

The wooden bridge was used for a portion of the Butterfield Overland Mail stage route used for only a few months between August 1860 and March 1861. After the American Civil War began, the mail route was no longer used and the original wooden bridge was abandoned, deteriorated and collapsed into the river.

In 1873 a new iron bridge was built and a post office established, thus formally creating the city of Bridgeport, TX. Its future was assured in 1882 when Charles Cates discovered a vein of bituminous coal while drilling for water. The Wise County Coal Company was formed and was a leading producer of coal for the state until competition from natural gas and petroleum closed the coal mines in 1929.

A Catholic congregation was served by Rev. J.J O'Riordan from Henrietta. The first Catholic Church in Wise County, the St. John the Baptizer Catholic Church, was constructed in 1926.

In 1893 the Rock Island Railroad established a line east of the town, so the town moved approximately one mile east to its present site. In 1913 the town was incorporated. Gas and oil production became a local industry prior to 1917. The 1920s census showed a town of 1,872. During the 1920s, limestone quarries that produced aggregate for road construction and a brick factory were established. In 1931, a dam was constructed approximately three miles west of town on the West Fork of the Trinity River, creating Lake Bridgeport. The lake was a local center for recreation and remains so today.

During the latter half of the 20th century, Bridgeport's oil, gas, and limestone industries continued to flourish and the town became the second largest town in Wise County. Oil, gas, and limestone remained major industries of Bridgepoint in the 21st century.

== Geography ==
According to the United States Census Bureau, Bridgeport has a total area of 7.9 square miles (20 km2), all land.[7]

=== Climate ===
The climate in this area is characterized by hot, humid summers and generally mild to cool winters. According to the Köppen climate classification system, Bridgeport has a humid subtropical climate, Cfa on climate maps.

Climate data for Bridgeport, Texas (1991–2020 normals, extremes 1935–2020)
| Month | Jan | Feb | Mar | Apr | May | Jun | Jul | Aug | Sep | Oct | Nov | Dec | Year |
|---|---|---|---|---|---|---|---|---|---|---|---|---|---|
| Record high °F (°C) | 92 (33) | 96 (36) | 96 (36) | 101 (38) | 106 (41) | 115 (46) | 114 (46) | 115 (46) | 111 (44) | 105 (41) | 93 (34) | 90 (32) | 115 (46) |
| Mean daily maximum °F (°C) | 56.1 (13.4) | 60.0 (15.6) | 67.5 (19.7) | 75.6 (24.2) | 82.8 (28.2) | 90.8 (32.7) | 95.6 (35.3) | 95.9 (35.5) | 88.4 (31.3) | 78.2 (25.7) | 66.5 (19.2) | 57.8 (14.3) | 76.3 (24.6) |
| Daily mean °F (°C) | 43.5 (6.4) | 47.3 (8.5) | 54.8 (12.7) | 63.3 (17.4) | 71.8 (22.1) | 80.0 (26.7) | 83.9 (28.8) | 83.5 (28.6) | 76.2 (24.6) | 65.2 (18.4) | 53.9 (12.2) | 45.3 (7.4) | 64.1 (17.8) |
| Mean daily minimum °F (°C) | 30.9 (−0.6) | 34.6 (1.4) | 42.1 (5.6) | 50.9 (10.5) | 60.8 (16.0) | 69.2 (20.7) | 72.1 (22.3) | 71.1 (21.7) | 63.9 (17.7) | 52.1 (11.2) | 41.2 (5.1) | 32.8 (0.4) | 51.8 (11.0) |
| Record low °F (°C) | 1 (−17) | 1 (−17) | 9 (−13) | 24 (−4) | 34 (1) | 48 (9) | 53 (12) | 52 (11) | 33 (1) | 21 (−6) | 10 (−12) | −8 (−22) | −8 (−22) |
| Average precipitation inches (mm) | 1.67 (42) | 2.21 (56) | 2.84 (72) | 3.04 (77) | 4.55 (116) | 3.73 (95) | 2.07 (53) | 2.18 (55) | 3.04 (77) | 3.91 (99) | 2.19 (56) | 1.91 (49) | 33.34 (847) |
| Average snowfall inches (cm) | 0.6 (1.5) | 0.5 (1.3) | 0.0 (0.0) | 0.2 (0.51) | 0.0 (0.0) | 0.0 (0.0) | 0.0 (0.0) | 0.0 (0.0) | 0.0 (0.0) | 0.0 (0.0) | 0.3 (0.76) | 0.2 (0.51) | 1.8 (4.6) |
| Average precipitation days (≥ 0.01 in) | 4.5 | 4.8 | 5.4 | 5.4 | 7.8 | 6.3 | 4.1 | 4.5 | 5.1 | 5.6 | 4.4 | 4.2 | 62.1 |
| Average snowy days (≥ 0.1 in) | 0.2 | 0.1 | 0.1 | 0.0 | 0.0 | 0.0 | 0.0 | 0.0 | 0.0 | 0.0 | 0.0 | 0.2 | 0.6 |
Source: NOAA

== Demographics ==
Historical population
| Census | Pop. | Note | %± |
|---|---|---|---|
| 1880 | 39 | | — |
| 1890 | 498 | | 1,176.9% |
| 1900 | 900 | | 80.7% |
| 1910 | 2,000 | | 122.2% |
| 1920 | 1,872 | | −6.4% |
| 1930 | 2,464 | | 31.6% |
| 1940 | 1,735 | | −29.6% |
| 1950 | 2,049 | | 18.1% |
| 1960 | 3,218 | | 57.1% |
| 1970 | 3,614 | | 12.3% |
| 1980 | 3,737 | | 3.4% |
| 1990 | 3,581 | | −4.2% |
| 2000 | 4,309 | | 20.3% |
| 2010 | 5,976 | | 38.7% |
| 2020 | 5,923 | | −0.9% |
| 2023 (est.) | 6,514 | | 10.0% |
U.S. Decennial Census

=== 2020 census ===
As of the 2020 census, there were 5,923 people, 1,767 households, and 1,322 families residing in the city. The median age was 33.7 years. 27.9% of residents were under the age of 18 and 11.0% of residents were 65 years of age or older. For every 100 females there were 113.7 males, and for every 100 females age 18 and over there were 118.2 males age 18 and over.

0% of residents lived in urban areas, while 100.0% lived in rural areas.

There were 1,767 households in Bridgeport, of which 45.4% had children under the age of 18 living in them. Of all households, 54.3% were married-couple households, 14.1% were households with a male householder and no spouse or partner present, and 26.3% were households with a female householder and no spouse or partner present. About 20.9% of all households were made up of individuals and 10.7% had someone living alone who was 65 years of age or older.

There were 1,937 housing units, of which 8.8% were vacant. Among occupied housing units, 62.3% were owner-occupied and 37.7% were renter-occupied. The homeowner vacancy rate was 2.4% and the rental vacancy rate was 8.7%.

Bridgeport racial composition as of 2020 (NH = Non-Hispanic) (Note: Note: the US Census treats Hispanic/Latino as an ethnic category. This table excludes Latinos from the racial categories and assigns them to a separate category. Hispanics/Latinos can be of any race.)
| Race | Number | Percentage |
|---|---|---|
| White (NH) | 2,750 | 46.43% |
| Black or African American (NH) | 157 | 2.65% |
| Native American or Alaska Native (NH) | 25 | 0.42% |
| Asian (NH) | 45 | 0.76% |
| Some Other Race (NH) | 3 | 0.05% |
| Mixed/Multi-Racial (NH) | 192 | 3.24% |
| Hispanic or Latino | 2,751 | 46.45% |
| Total | 5,923 | |

Racial composition as of the 2020 census
| Race | Percent |
|---|---|
| White | 57.8% |
| Black or African American | 2.7% |
| American Indian and Alaska Native | 1.0% |
| Asian | 0.8% |
| Native Hawaiian and Other Pacific Islander | 0% |
| Some other race | 18.9% |
| Two or more races | 18.7% |
| Hispanic or Latino (of any race) | 46.4% |

== Education ==
Bridgeport is served by the Bridgeport Independent School District.

== Transportation ==
Bridgeport is served by the Bridgeport Municipal Airport.

== Highways ==
- US 380
- SH 129
- SH 114
- SH 101
- FM 920

== Recreation ==
Lake Bridgeport is located west of the city and offers recreational boating and watersports, as well as freshwater fishing. Bridgeport Falls is also located to the south, on the West Fork of the Trinity River.

The City operates Northwest OHV Park on the north of the city limits. This is a 300-acre park for motorcycles, ATVs, UTVs, and Jeeps to roam over trails through varied terrain.

== Banking ==
For almost 100 years, Bridgeport was served by the First National Bank of Bridgeport. The bank was purchased in the late 1900s by primary investors Billie C. Green, W.W. "Wilson" Ray, and M.L. Manoushagian. It, however, was sold in December 2005 to First Financial Bank (Texas) (stock symbol FFIN) based in Abilene and became part of a six branch bank consisting of institutions in Bridgeport, Boyd, Decatur, Keller, and Trophy Club.

The Community Bank opened the doors for business in June 2007. It is the only locally owned and independently operated bank in Bridgeport, Texas. Every year, the bank donates thousands of dollars and numerous hours of community service to the school district and local charities. The Community Bank is guided by officers Theresa East, Jamie Cook and Joe Murphy.

== Notable people ==
- Kyle Clifton, formerly of the NFL New York Jets, graduated from Bridgeport High School in 1980
- Colin Jones (American football), NFL safety for the Carolina Panthers
