= Bridgeport Municipal Airport =

Municipal airport in Bridgeport, Texas, United States

- IATA: none; ICAO: KXBP; FAA LID: XBP

Summary
- Airport type: Public
- Owner: City of Bridgeport
- Location: Bridgeport, Texas
- Elevation AMSL: 864 ft (263 m)
- Coordinates: 33°10′31″N 097°49′42″W

Map
- Location within Texas

Runways
Direction	Length		Surface
Direction	ft	m	Surface
18/36	5,005	1,526	Asphalt

Statistics (2022)
- Aircraft operations (year ending 9/20/2022): 22,400
- Based aircraft: 30
- Source: Federal Aviation Administration

Bridgeport Municipal Airport (ICAO: KXBP, FAA LID: XBP) is a public airport near Bridgeport, in Wise County, Texas. It is owned by the City of Bridgeport and is located 4 nautical miles (7.4 km) southwest of the central business district.

Most U.S. airports use the same three-letter location identifier for the FAA and IATA, but Bridgeport Municipal Airport is XBP (formerly 1F9) to the FAA and has no IATA code.

== Facilities and aircraft ==
Bridgeport Municipal Airport covers 206 acres (83 ha) and has one asphalt runway, 18/36, 5,005 x 75 ft (1,526 x 23 m).

In the year ending September 20, 2022, the airport had 22,400 aircraft operations, all general aviation. 30 aircraft were then based at the airport: 24 single engine, and 6 multi-engine.

== Accidents and incidents ==
- 16 July 2001: In a rare case of airplane theft, two men stole a Piper PA-28-180 from Parker County Airport near Weatherford, Texas, but crashed while attempting to land at Bridgeport Municipal Airport a short time later. Hudson Oaks police speculated that the men intended to refuel the aircraft in Bridgeport before flying it to Oklahoma. Neither of the thieves had ever held a pilot certificate, but the man who acted as pilot reportedly had 6 hours of prior flight time. (Note: The circumstances of the man's prior flight time are not made clear in the NTSB accident report, but it is likely that he had taken the controls while a certificated pilot was acting as pilot-in-command.) The aircraft impacted the runway in a nose-down attitude and slid for a considerable distance; both men suffered serious injuries. No verifiable problems were found in the engine, airframe, or flight controls. The accident was attributed to "the non-certificated pilot's improper flare which resulted in a hard landing."

== See also ==
- List of airports in Texas
