= Fort Worth Meacham International Airport =

General aviation airport in Fort Worth, Texas, United States

- IATA: FTW; ICAO: KFTW; FAA LID: FTW

Summary
- Airport type: Public
- Operator: City of Fort Worth
- Serves: Dallas–Fort Worth metroplex
- Location: Fort Worth, Texas
- Elevation AMSL: 710 ft (220 m)
- Coordinates: 32°49′11.2″N 97°21′44.8″W
- Website: www.meacham.com

Map
- Location of airport in Texas / United States FTW/KFTW/FTW (the United States)

Runways
Direction	Length		Surface
Direction	ft	m	Surface
9/27 (closed)	3,677	1,121	Asphalt
16/34	7,502	2,287	Concrete
17/35	4,005	1,221	Asphalt
- Source: Federal Aviation Administration

Fort Worth Meacham International Airport (Meacham Field) (IATA: FTW, ICAO: KFTW, FAA LID: FTW) is a general-aviation airport located near the intersection of Interstate 820 and Business U.S. Highway 287 in Fort Worth, Texas, United States. It is named after former Fort Worth Mayor Henry C. Meacham. The airport covers 745 acres (301 ha).

== History ==
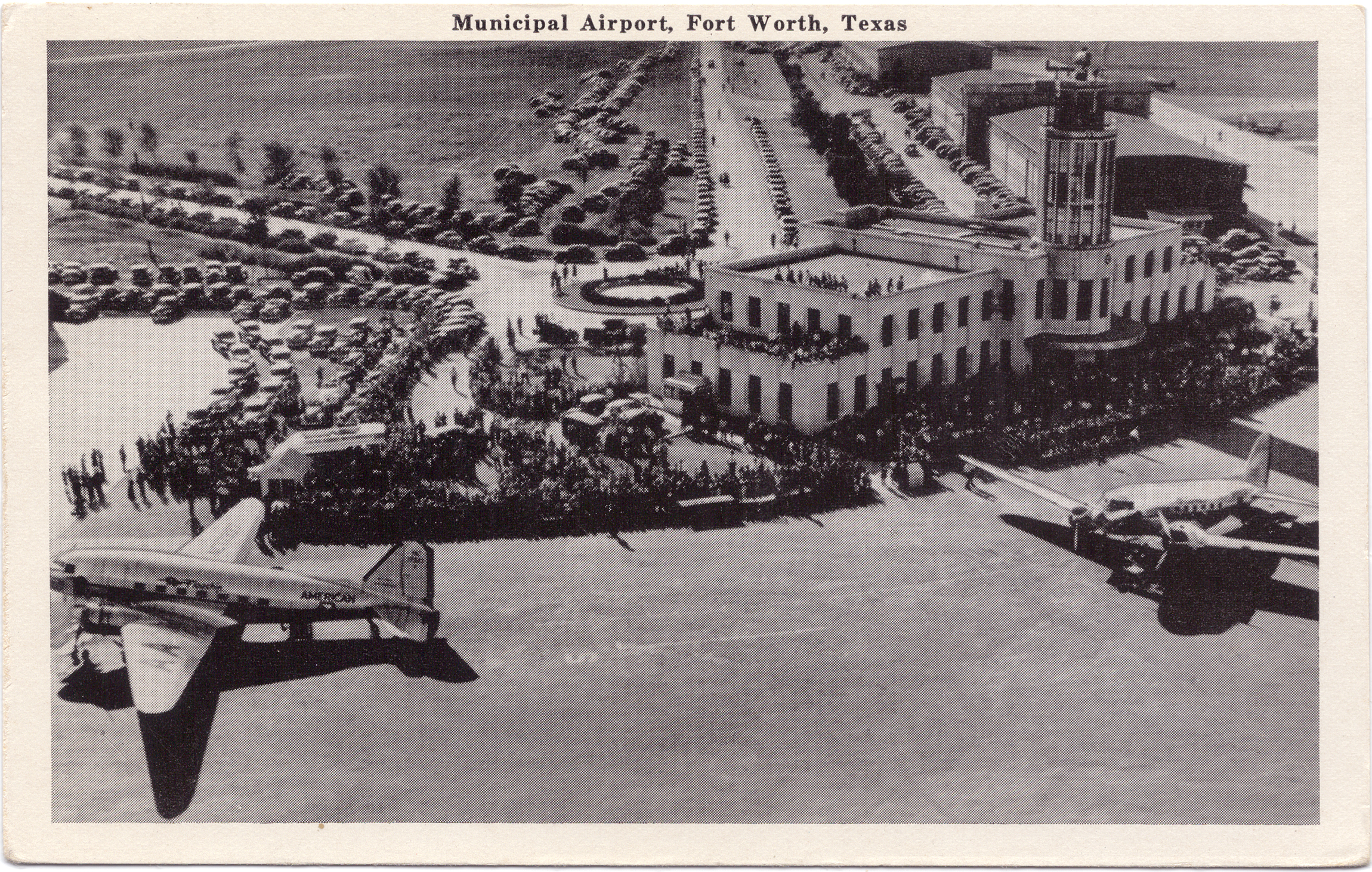
Postcard of Fort Worth Municipal Airport, undated

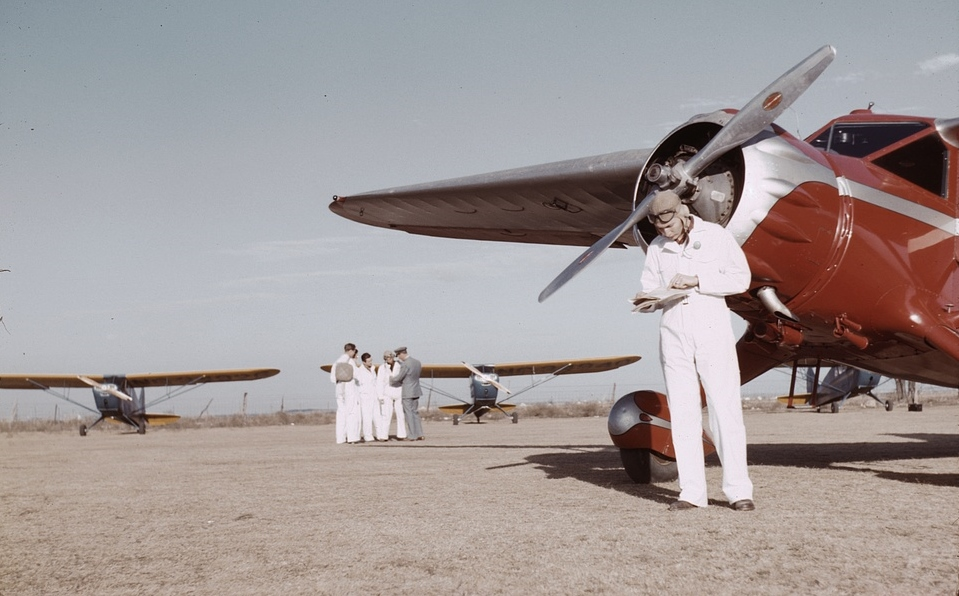
Civilian training school students and instructors at Meacham Field in 1942

Meacham Airport , Fort Worth's original airport, was built as an Army training field in 1914. It was purchased by the city of Fort Worth on July 3, 1925, and renamed as Fort Worth Municipal Airport. In 1927, the airport was renamed Meacham Field after former Fort Worth Mayor Henry C. Meacham. During World War II, Meacham Field was used as a stop for military aircraft traveling from Eastern factories heading to the West Coast.

Meacham was Fort Worth's major airport until April 1953, when major carriers moved to Amon Carter Field (later Greater Southwest International Airport). The January 1953 OAG shows 50 weekday airline departures from Meacham, 33 of which headed for Dallas. None of the others flew nonstop north of Wichita Falls, west of Midland, south of Austin, or east of Dallas.

Since 1953, Meacham Airport has been used for corporate aircraft, commuter flights, and student pilot training. It was renamed in 1985 to Fort Worth Meacham Airport and in 1995 to Fort Worth Meacham International Airport. Since 1953, seven airlines have tried scheduled passenger flights from Meacham; none lasted more than a few years.

- Tejas Airlines (1979–80) flew Fairchild Swearingen Metroliners to Austin, Houston, Corpus Christi, San Antonio, and Laredo.
- Metro Airlines (1979–81) flew DHC-6 Twin Otters.
- Fort Worth Airlines (1984–85) flew NAMC YS-11s.
- Exec Express Airlines (1987–88), later Lone Star Airlines, flew Dornier 228s.
- Mesa Airlines (1997–98) flew Canadair CRJ regional jets.

In April 2006, low-cost carrier Skybus Airlines expressed interest in operating out of the airfield as it started operations in 2007, but it folded before the repeal of the Wright Amendment in 2014.

On 16 April 2008, the American Airways Hangar and Administration Building, constructed at the airport in 1933, was added to the National Register of Historic Places.

On 15 January 2015, the airport advisory board voted to permanently close runway 9/27 to make room for additional hangars. The runway had been closed for about a year due to deteriorating pavement.

In 2018, city officials and company founder David Neeleman hinted that a proposed low-cost carrier, tentatively named Moxy, now named Breeze Airways, might operate from Meacham starting in 2020. Due to COVID-19, Breeze's launch has been delayed. The city aviation director at the time, Bill Welstead, denied holding discussions with Moxy, but confirmed that Frontier Airlines and Allegiant Air were interested in serving the airport. Although the city has recently spent millions of dollars on several projects to improve airport facilities for general aviation, Welstead claimed that the city was not actively planning to build adequate terminal parking for passengers, which he said would be necessary before commercial airline service could begin.

== Operations ==
As of April 2026, Meacham is used for general-aviation purposes. Several companies operate aircraft services at the airport, including a division of the U.S. defense contractor Alliant Techsystems (ATK) and Texas Aviation Services. An aviation museum (open weekends and by appointment during the week) is located in Hangar 33S on the airport's south side, at the end of Ellis Street. The terminal building houses several ATK employees, some Fort Worth city departments (mainly Aviation and Housing Development), a branch of Enterprise Rent-A-Car, and several aviation-related businesses. The Civil Air Patrol operates two squadrons at Meacham, the Fort Worth Senior Squadron, and the Phoenix Composite Squadron. Two FBOs operate on the field: Modern Aviation and Texas Jet. In 2020, FBO Cornerstone Air Center closed its doors. In the summer of 2024, the old American Aero FBO owned by Robert Bass was sold to Modern Aviation.

=== Airlines and destinations ===
Airlines	Destinations
Bombardier Business Jet Solutions	Charter: Dallas/Fort Worth, Austin
Citationshares	Charter: Providence, Dallas/Fort Worth
Netjets	Charter: Charlotte
Charter Fleet International	Charter: Dallas/Fort Worth, Houston–Intercontinental, Angel Fire, Austin
Clay Lacy Aviation	Charter: Los Angeles–Van Nuys, New York–Waterbury-Oxford, Miami–Opa Locka, Portland (OR), other destinations nationwide

At one time, Fort Worth Airlines had its headquarters at the airport.

== Accidents and incidents ==
- 9 October 1982: A Cessna 152, registration number N89023, ran off the runway into a ditch and was destroyed after the pilot lost directional control on landing. The pilot and sole occupant suffered minor injuries.
- 6 March 1984: The right engine of a Piper PA-23-250, registration number N777RG, failed on takeoff after a touch-and-go landing. Although another runway aligned with the takeoff runway was only 3 miles (4.8 km) ahead, the pilots did not attempt to reach it, and instead executed an immediate forced landing in a nearby open field. The aircraft was destroyed, but the two pilots, who were the sole occupants, were not injured. National Transportation Safety Board (NTSB) investigators found the fuel selector in the OFF position for the right engine, causing fuel starvation. The accident was attributed to the improper fuel selector position, poor judgment by the pilots, and failure to understand and follow proper emergency procedures.
- 25 June 1989: A Cessna 152, registration number N24795, rolled to the left and stalled after controllers advised the pilots to go around due to shifting winds. The ensuing crash and postcrash fire destroyed the aircraft and killed the two pilots. The accident was attributed to: "The inadvertent stall of the airplane by the pilot. Factors contributing to the accident were the pilot's disregard of the weather advisory, the unfavorable windshift, and the thunderstorm outflow."
- 20 November 1996: A Piper PA-28R-200 Arrow, registration number N1394T, crashed into power lines on final approach while performing an instrument landing system approach at night in low visibility. The aircraft was destroyed and the two pilots were killed. The accident was attributed to "the pilots' continued descent of the aircraft below decision height. Factors contributing to the accident were the fog, the dark night illumination, one of the pilot's [sic] impairment due to use of marihuana, and both pilots' fatigue."
- 27 February 1998: A Douglas A4D-2 Skyhawk, registration number N21NB, BuNo 145011, overran Runway 34R on landing and was substantially damaged; the pilot suffered minor injuries. On approach to the airport, the pilot told controllers that he was experiencing engine surges and a "total system failure." The pilot lowered the landing gear using the emergency extension procedure, but the engine surged again, causing the aircraft to touch down at a higher speed than intended, and the pilot was unable to stop the aircraft on the runway. The accident was attributed to "[a] total hydraulic system failure for an undetermined reason." The aircraft, painted in Royal Australian Navy colors, was later restored and placed on static display at the Air Zoo at Kalamazoo/Battle Creek International Airport.

== See also ==
- List of airports in Texas
