= Clowes =

Clowes is a surname. Notable people with the surname include:

- Caroline Morgan Clowes (1838–1904), American painter
- Cyril Clowes (1892–1968), Australian soldier
- Daniel Clowes (born 1961), Alternative cartoonist and screenwriter
- Hannah Clowes (born 1991), English gymnast
- Henry Clowes (1863–1899), English cricketer
- John Clowes (footballer) (1929–2021), English footballer
- John Clowes (priest) (1743–1831), English Anglican cleric and Swedenborgian
- Nick Laird-Clowes (born 1957), English musician and composer
- Ronald M. Clowes, Canadian geophysicist
- Samuel Clowes (Conservative politician) (1821–1898), English Conservative politician, MP for North Leicestershire 1868–1880
- Samuel Clowes (Labour politician) (1864–1928), English Labour politician, MP for Hanley 1924–1928
- Sue Clowes, English designer
- Thomas Clowes (1791–1866), New York politician
- Waliyato Clowes, Papua New Guinean politician
- William Clowes (Primitive Methodist) (1780–1851), one of the founders of Primitive Methodism
- William Clowes (printer) (1779–1847), printer who established William Clowes Ltd.
- William Laird Clowes (1856–1905), British journalist and historian
- William Clowes (surgeon) (1540–1604), English surgeon and author

== See also ==
- Clow (disambiguation)
- Cowes
