= Samuel Clowes =

Samuel Clowes may refer to:

- Samuel Clowes (Conservative politician) (1821–1898), English Conservative politician, MP for North Leicestershire 1868–1880
- Samuel Clowes (Labour politician) (1864–1928), English Labour politician, MP for Hanley 1924–1928

== See also ==
- Clowes (surname)
