= Clow =

Clow may refer to:

- Clow (surname)
- Clow, Arkansas
- Clow International Airport, in Bolingbrook, Illinois
- Clow Island, an island in Lake Fryxell, Victoria Land, Antarctica
- Clow Reed, a fictional character in the Cardcaptor Sakura series
- Clow Township, Kittson County, Minnesota
- Clow Valve Company, a subsidiary of McWane, Inc.
