= Frederick Rondel =

French-born American painter (1826–1892)

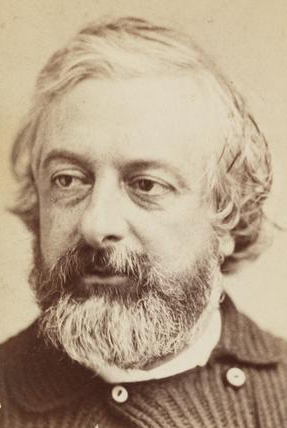
- Rondel c. 1866–1871
- Born: 1826; Paris, France
- Died: November 1892 (aged 65–66); Philadelphia, Pennsylvania, U.S.
- Resting place: Philadelphia, Pennsylvania
- Movement: Hudson River School

Frederick Rondel (1826 – November 1892) was a French-American landscape painter. Born in Paris, he was tutored in art by Théodore Gudin, a marine painter in King Louis Philippe I's court, before moving to the United States in 1855. In the United States, Rondel exhibited his works and taught painting to a number of pupils, including Winslow Homer and Charles Mielatz. He was a member of the Hudson River School movement and frequently depicted areas such as the Hudson River and the Adirondack Mountains.

== Biography ==
Rondel was born in Paris, France, in 1826. He was first tutored in art by Théodore Gudin, who served as a marine painter in King Louis Philippe I's court. He was subsequently tutored by Auguste Jugelet, who was also a student of Gudin. Rondel moved to the United States in 1855 and settled in Boston; there, he painted and produced lithographs. In 1857, his work was exhibited in New York City at the National Academy of Design; Rondel moved to New York near the end of 1859 and became a member of the National Academy in 1861. He also taught art; he tutored the well-known landscape painter Winslow Homer for a short time. Later, he trained the artists Charles Mielatz and F. Benedict Herzog.

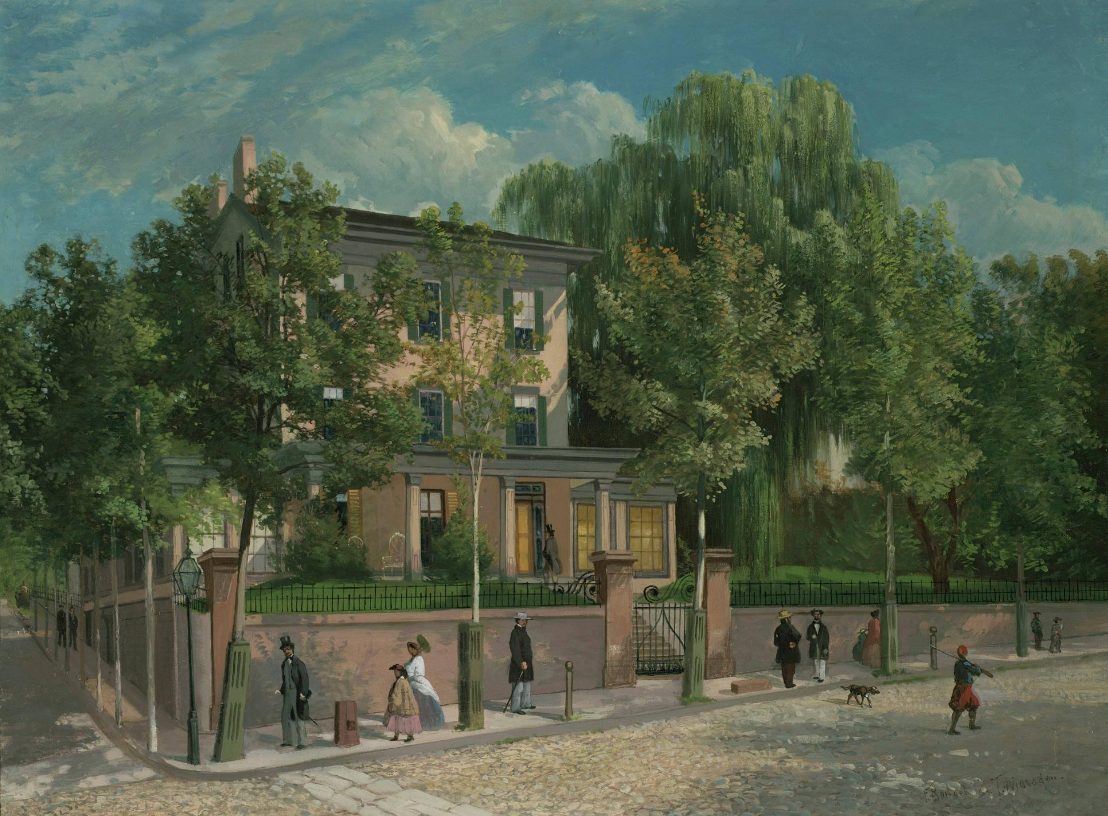
Matthew Vassar's Town Residence

Over the next few years, Rondel moved to various cities while maintaining his studio in New York, including Boston; South Malden, Massachusetts; and Poughkeepsie, New York. He also took extended trips to Europe in 1862 and San Francisco in 1875. He moved to Poughkeepsie by January 1862 and began teaching art to female students there, holding the position of professor of painting at the Cottage Hill Seminary. While there, he was commissioned by the merchant Matthew Vassar to paint a series of works depicting three of Vassar's homes, two of which were located in Poughkeepsie. He also befriended the painter Caroline Morgan Clowes there, whom he mentored and collaborated with up until the later years of his life.

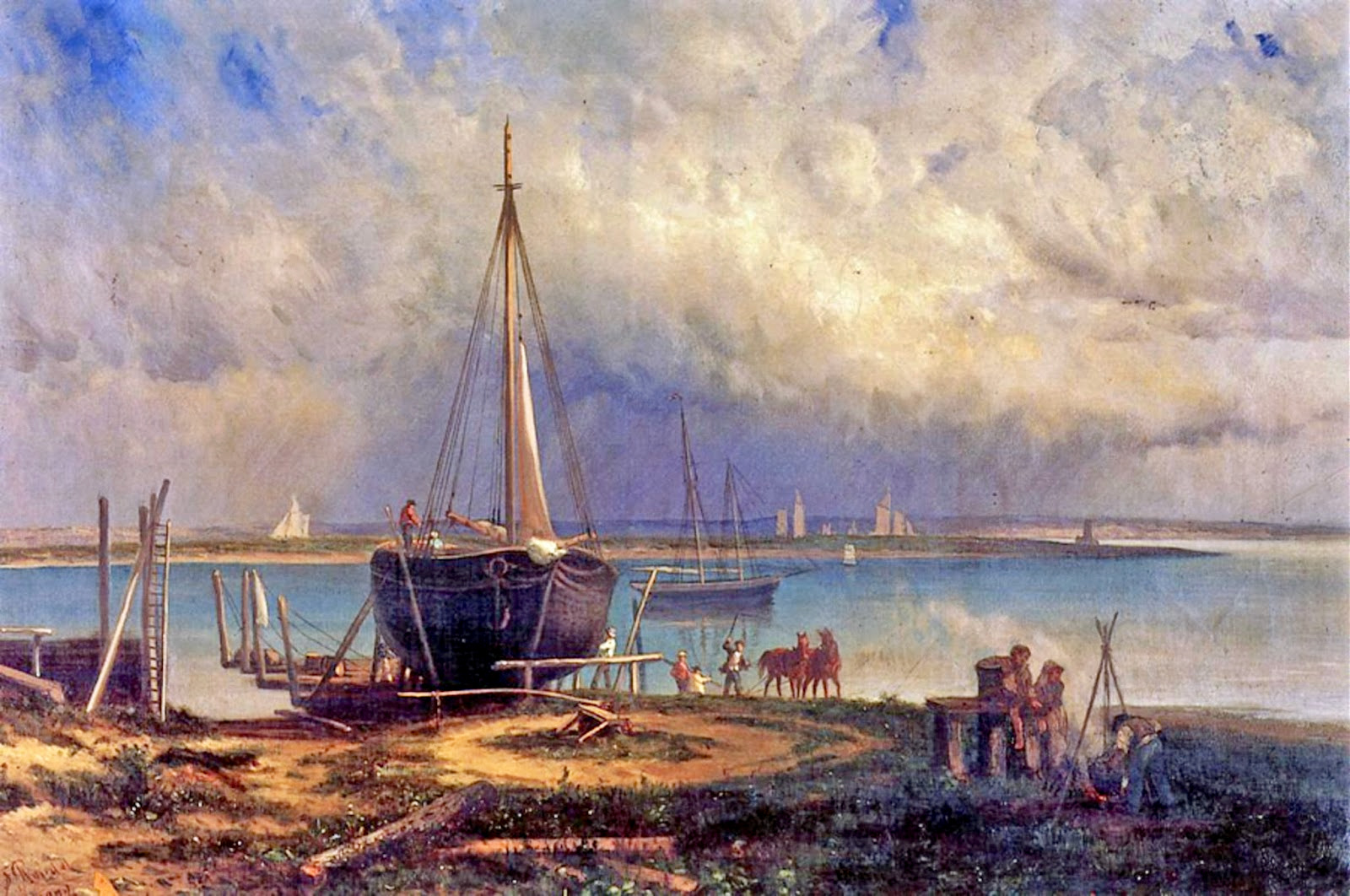
View of City Island

Rondel returned to New York City in 1868, where he continued to paint and exhibit his works, before relocating to New Rochelle, New York, in 1871. By 1892, Rondel had moved to Philadelphia, where he died and was buried in November of that year. He was eulogized in the Poughkeepsie Daily Eagle on December 1, with his obituary reporting that "his paintings are held in high repute". Rondel's son, Fredrick Rondel Jr., also became an artist.

=== Work ===
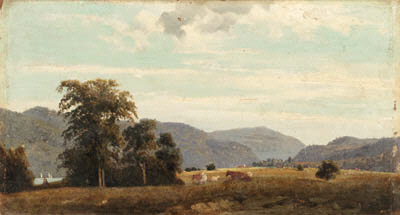
The Meadow, 1855

Rondel was primarily a landscape painter. He was a member of the Hudson River School movement and frequently depicted local areas such as the Hudson River and the Adirondack Mountains. Beyond landscapes, Rondel also produced genre paintings, still lifes, portraits, and marine paintings. Rondel's works have been exhibited in, among other museums and galleries, the Mint Museum, the Butler Institute of American Art, and the Corcoran Gallery of Art.
