= Elizabeth Colborne =

American artist

Elizabeth Aline Colborne
- Born: February 15, 1885; Chamberlain, South Dakota, U.S.
- Died: February 21, 1948 (aged 63); Seattle, Washington, U.S.
- Education: Pratt Institute, National Academy of Design, Art Students League of New York

Elizabeth Aline Colborne (1885–1948) was an American printmaker and illustrator.

== Biography ==
Colborne was born in Chamberlain, South Dakota, and raised in Bellingham, Washington. In 1903, she studied at Pratt Institute under Arthur Wesley Dow in New York City. In 1910, she studied at the National Academy of Design, under Charles Frederick William Mielatz, Robert Henri, and Rockwell Kent. In 1924, she studied at the Art Students League of New York under Allen Lewis.

In 1933, she moved back to Bellingham, Washington to work for the Works Progress Administration.

Her work is included in the collections of the Seattle Art Museum, the Whatcom Museum and the Minneapolis Institute of Art.
