= Charles Frederick William Mielatz =

German-born American printmaker, artist, educator (1864–1919)

- Born: Karl Friedrich Wilhelm Mielatz; May 24, 1864; Breddin, Kingdom of Prussia (now Germany)
- Died: July 2, 1919 (aged 55); New York City, New York, U.S.
- Education: Chicago School of Design and Painting
- Occupations: Etcher, lithographer, graphic artist, painter, educator
- Spouse: Mary Stuart McKinney

Charles Frederick William Mielatz (né Karl Friedrich Wilhelm Mielatz; May 24, 1864 – July 2, 1919) was a Prussian-born American etcher, graphic artist, painter, lithographer, and educator. He is considered a prominent etcher of architectural subjects in the United States of America.

== Biography ==
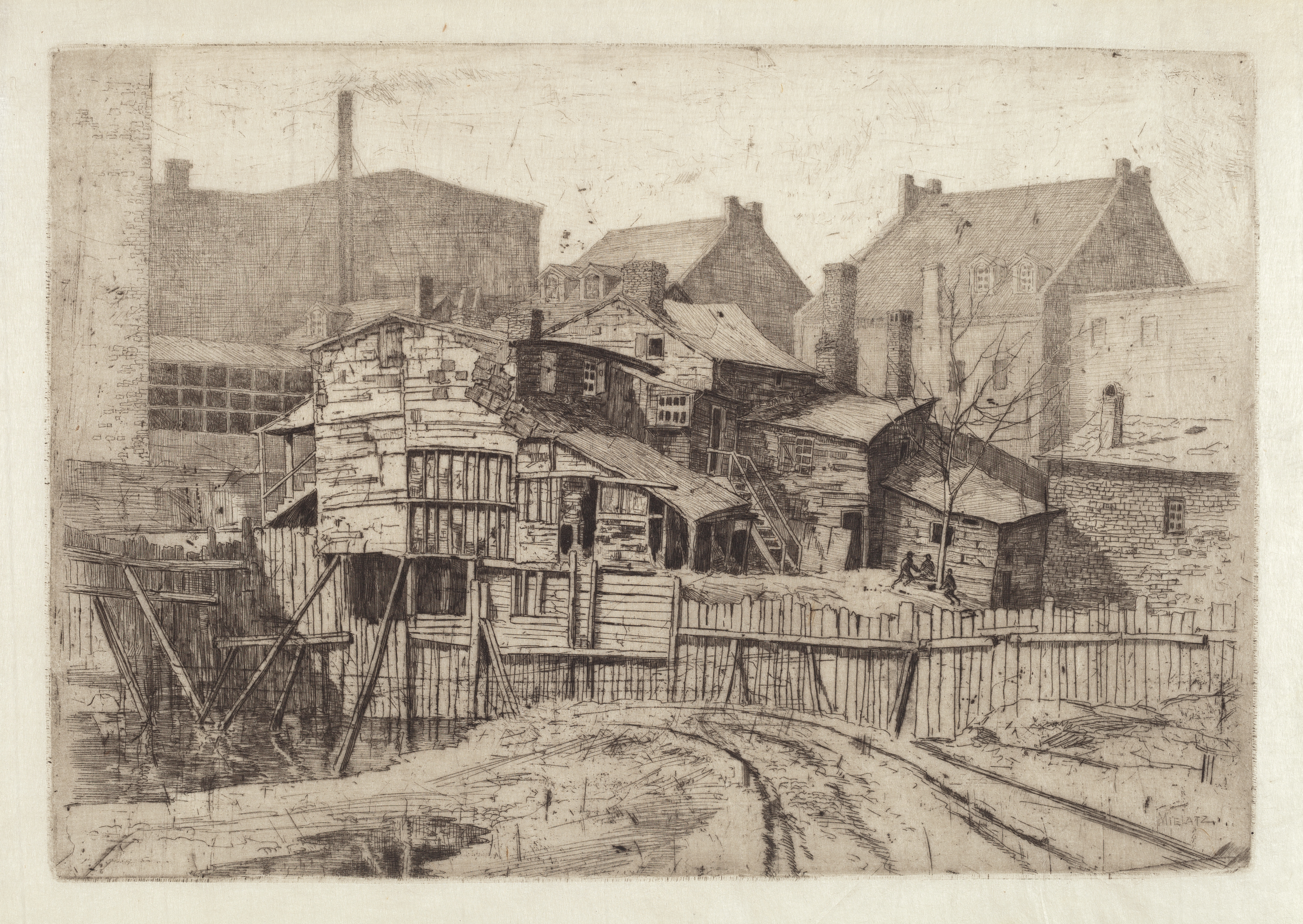
Untitled (Wooden House in City), 1880s

Mielatz was born on May 24, 1864 in Breddin, Kingdom of Prussia (now Germany). His parents were Wilhelmina (née Wolff) and Carl Mielatz. At the age of 6, he moved with his family to the United States. He studied at Chicago School of Design and Painting, under painter Frederick Rondel.

In the early 1880s, Mielatz moved to New York City, where he created his first etching in 1883. On February 25, 1903, Mielatz married Mary Stuart McKinney. In 1904, he became one of the first etching teachers at the National Academy of Design in New York City. Among his students were Anne Goldthwaite and Elizabeth Colborne.

Mielatz was a member of the New York Etching Club and the Brooklyn Society of Etchers. He was an associate member of the National Academy of Design from 1906.

He died on July 2, 1919 in New York City.

Mielatz's work can be found in museum collections including the Metropolitan Museum of Art, Smithsonian American Art Museum, Parrish Art Museum, Pennsylvania Academy of the Fine Arts, Fine Arts Museums of San Francisco, and the National Gallery of Art.

== Gallery ==
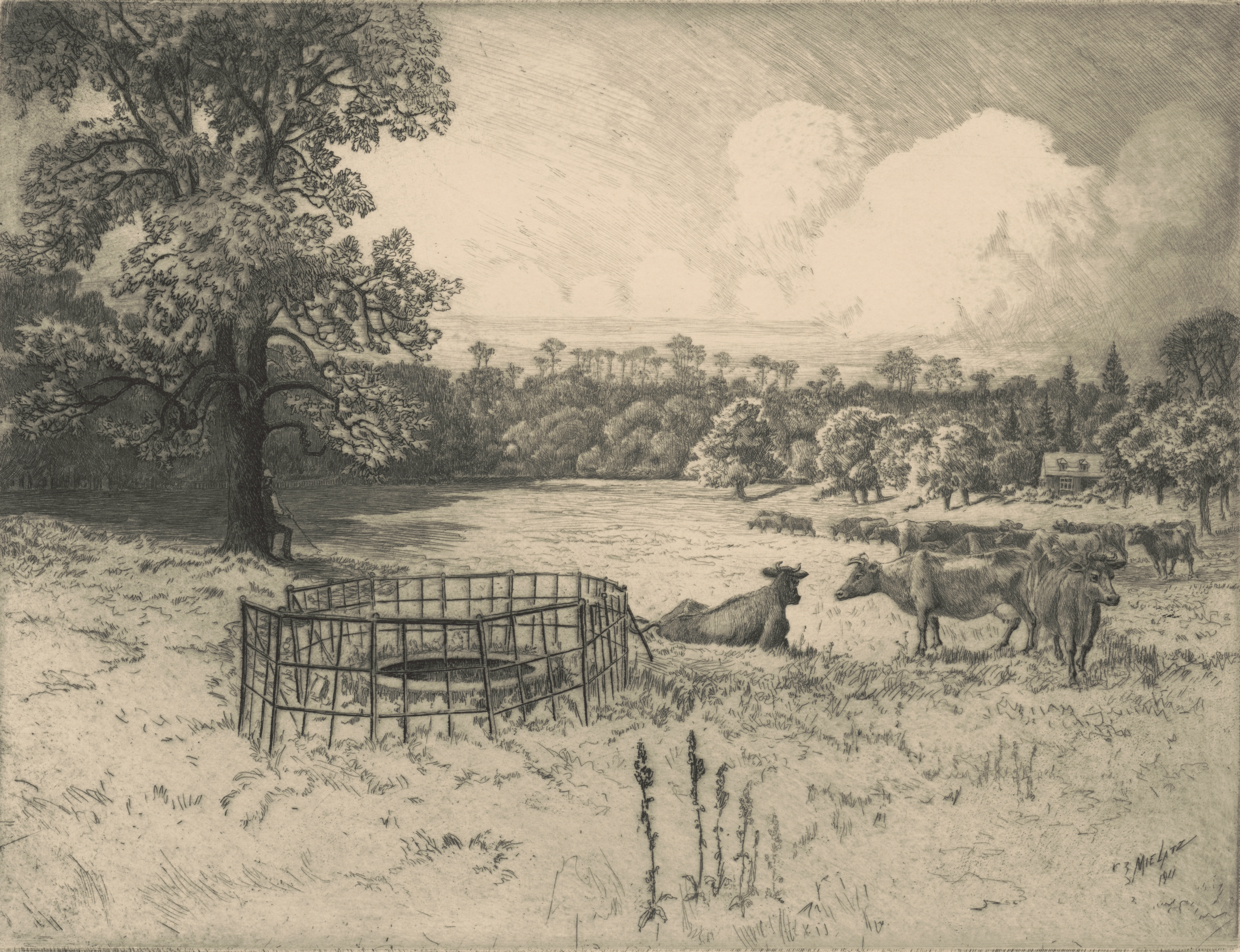
Rockwood Hall illustrations, 1911

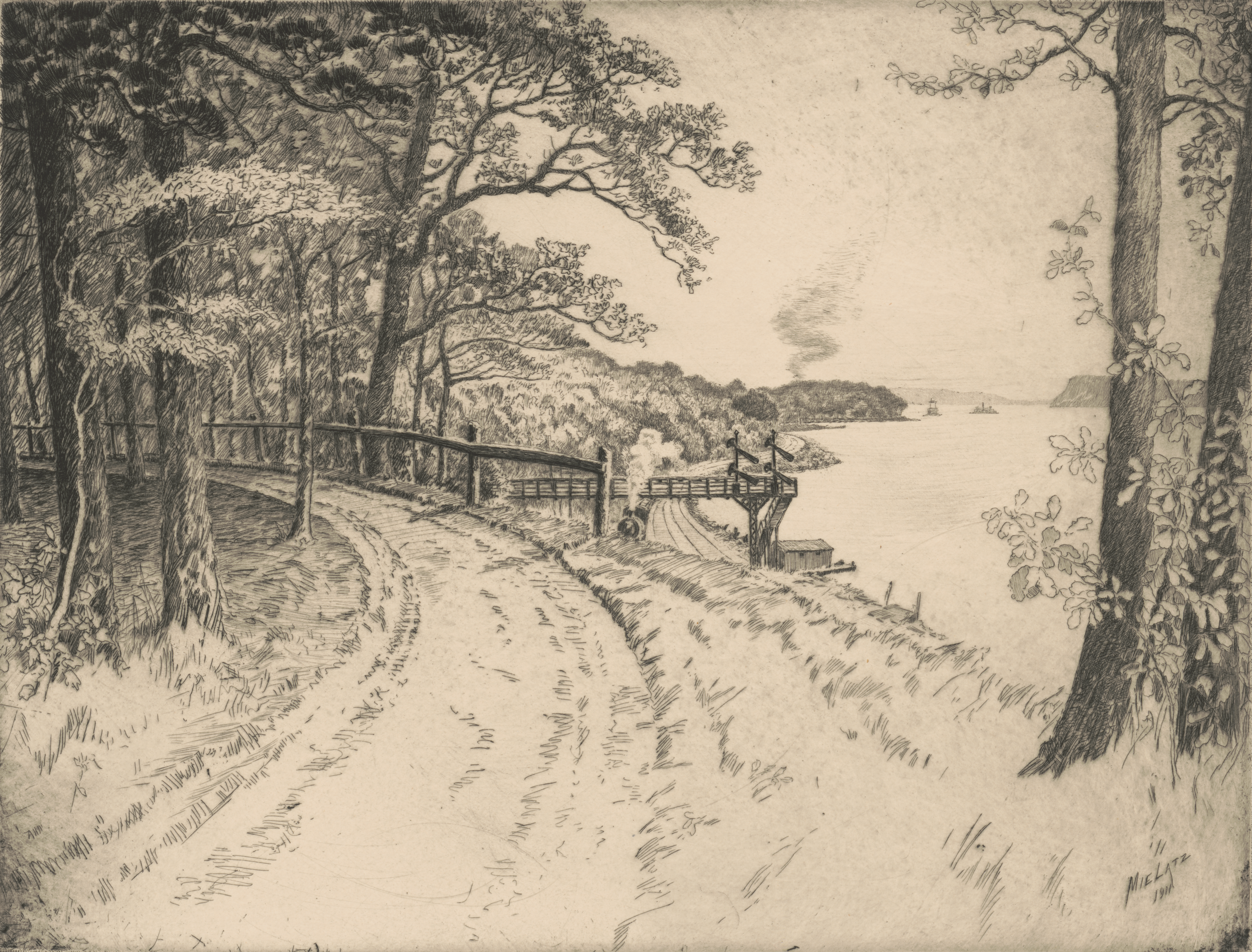
Rockwood Hall illustrations, 1911

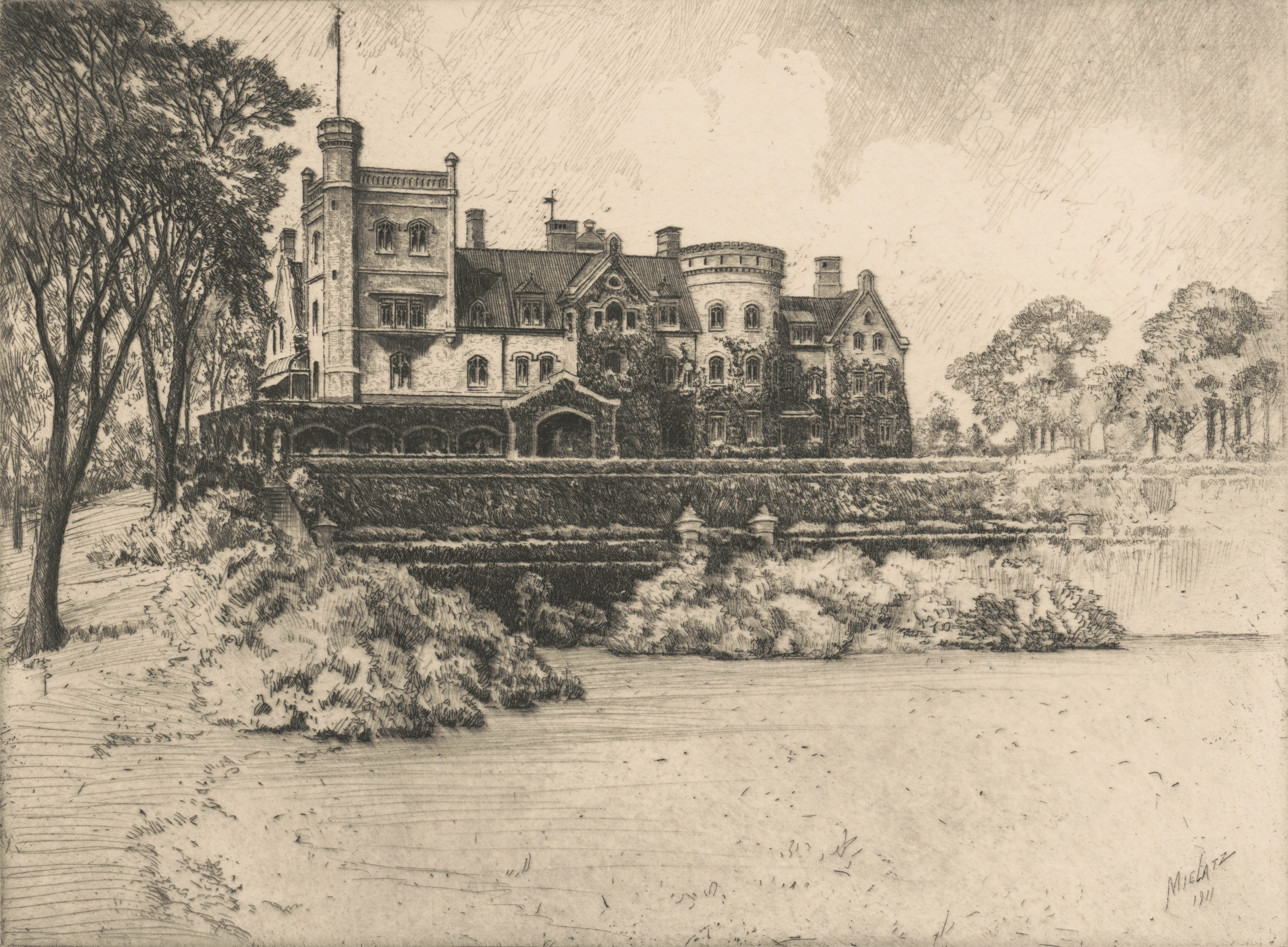
Rockwood Hall illustrations, 1911

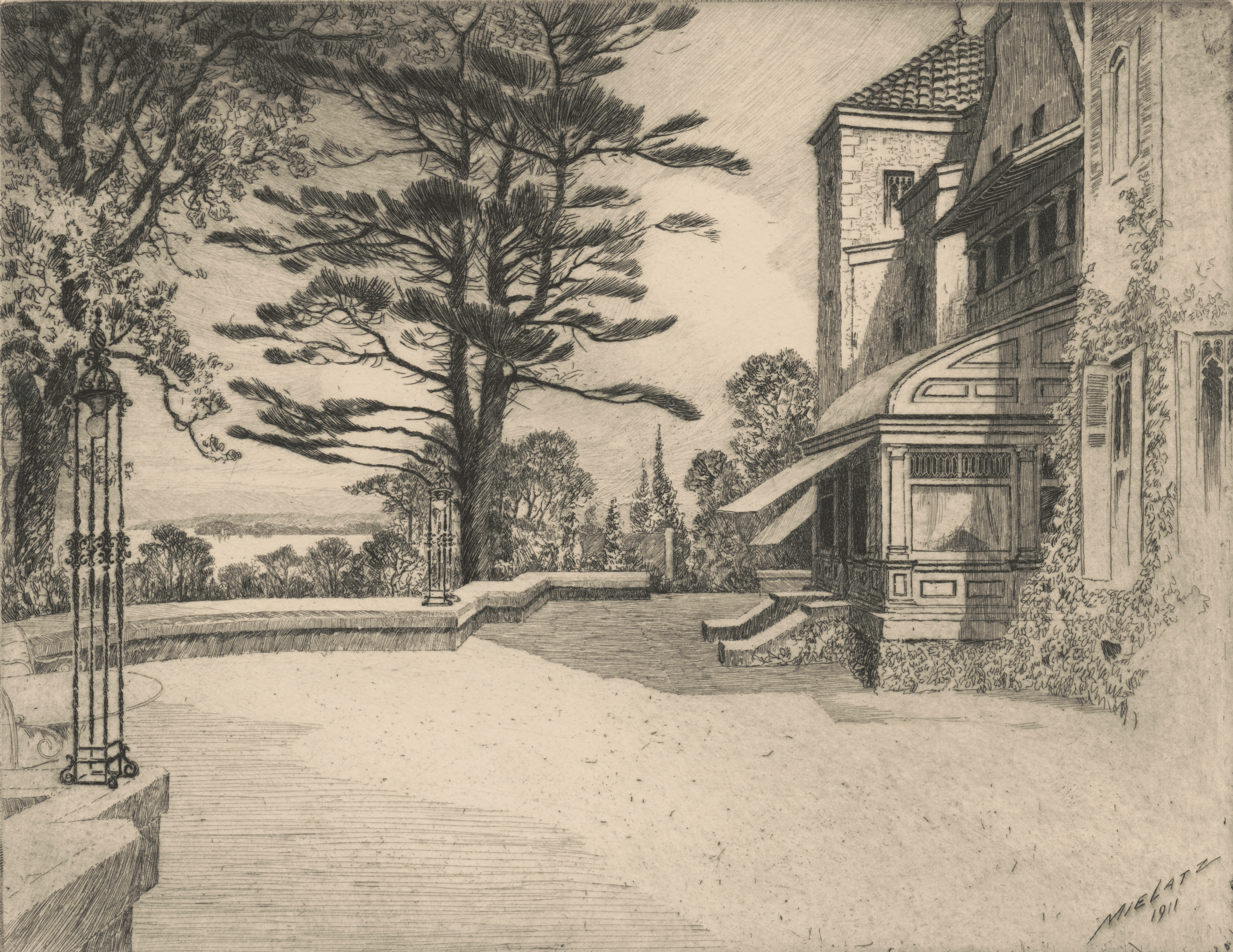
Rockwood Hall illustrations, 1911

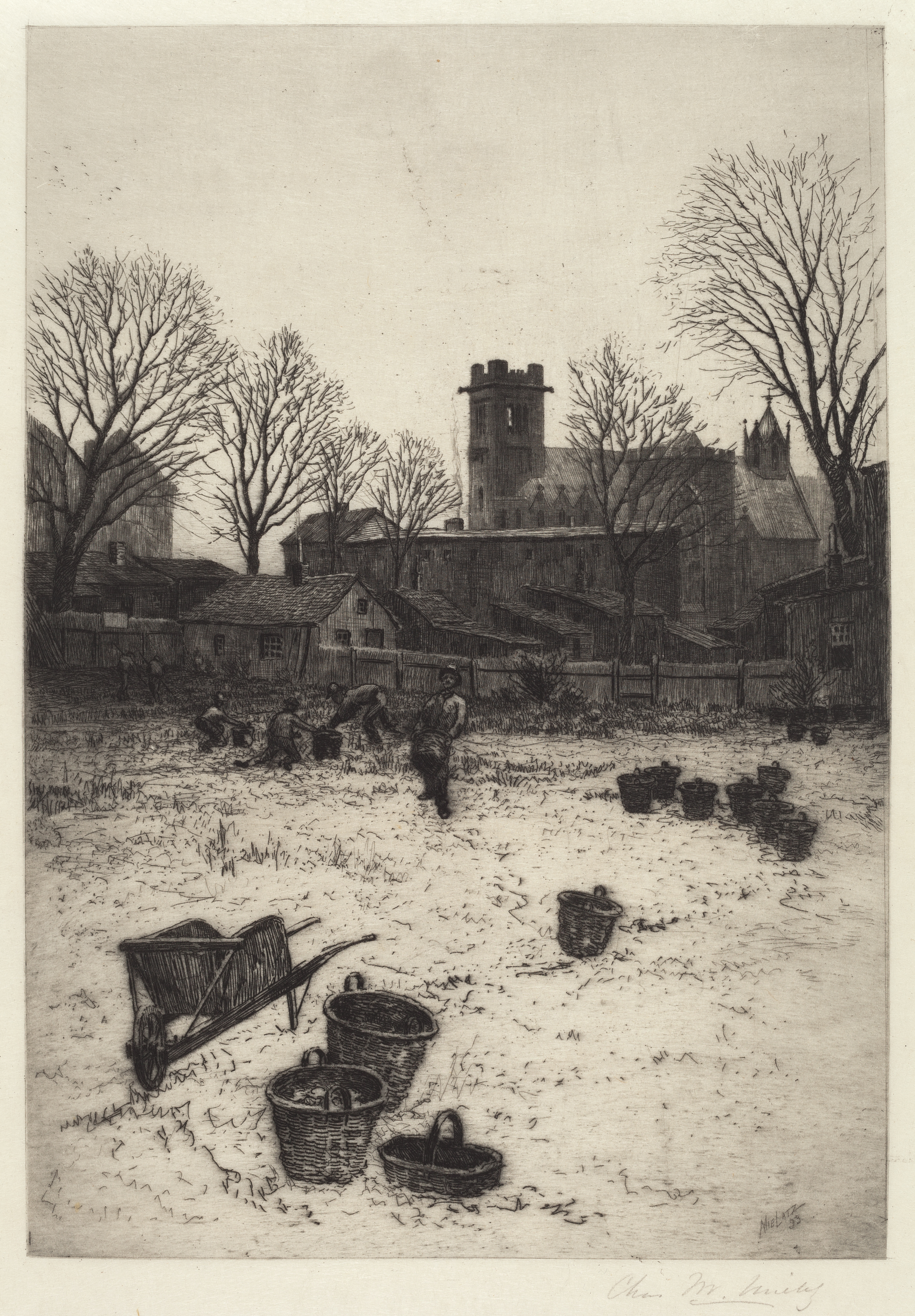
Untitled (Garden Scene), 1893

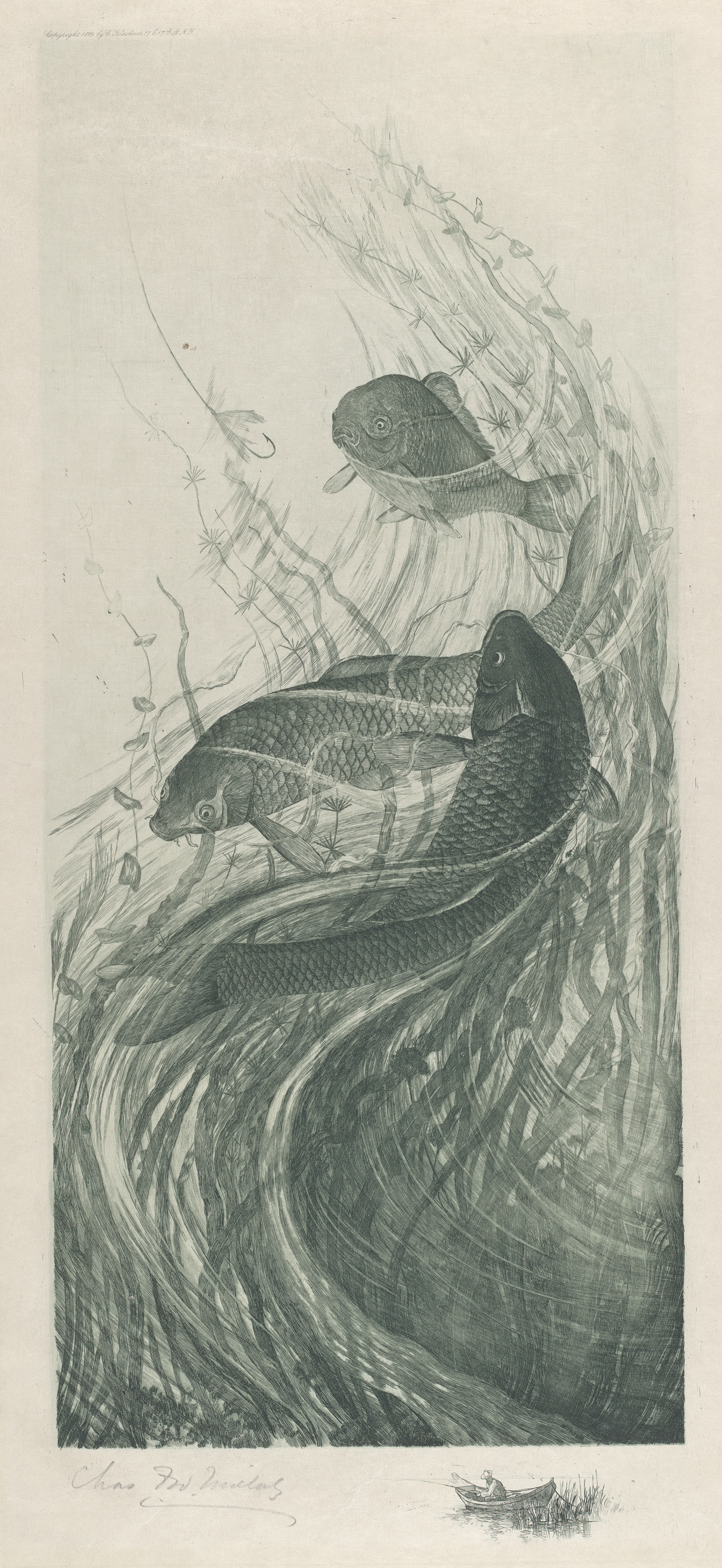
Temptation, 1887

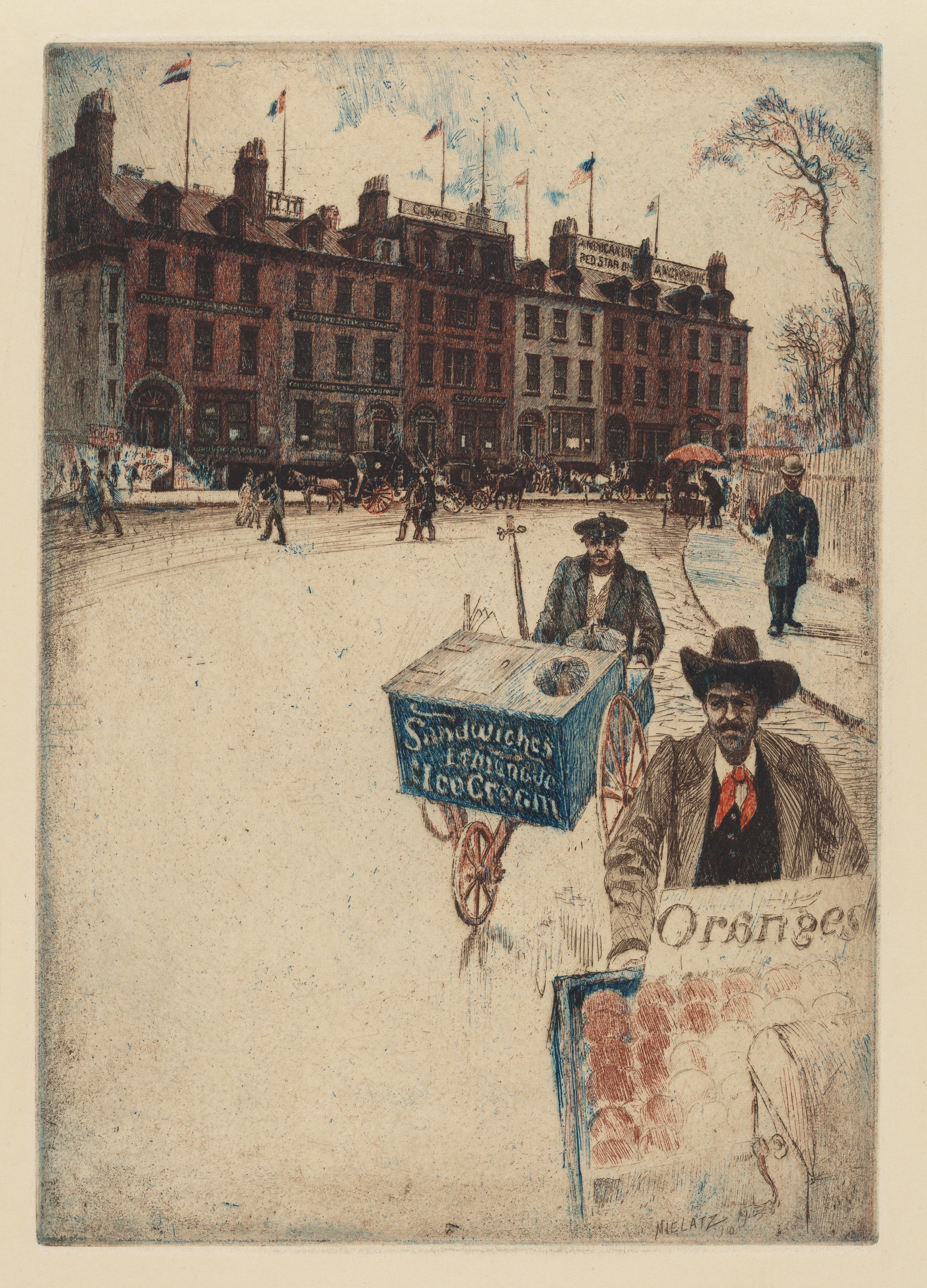
Bowling Green, 1910

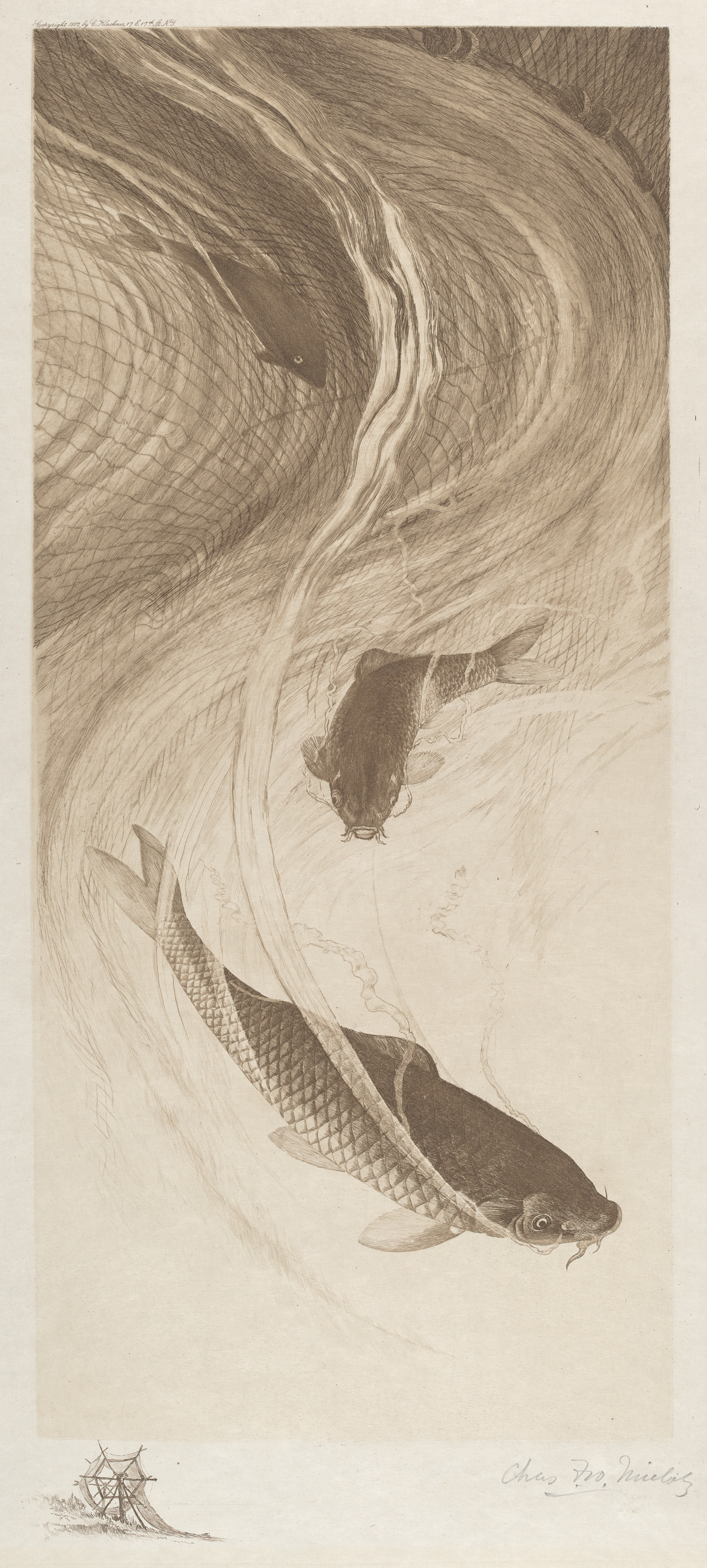
In the Meshes, 1887

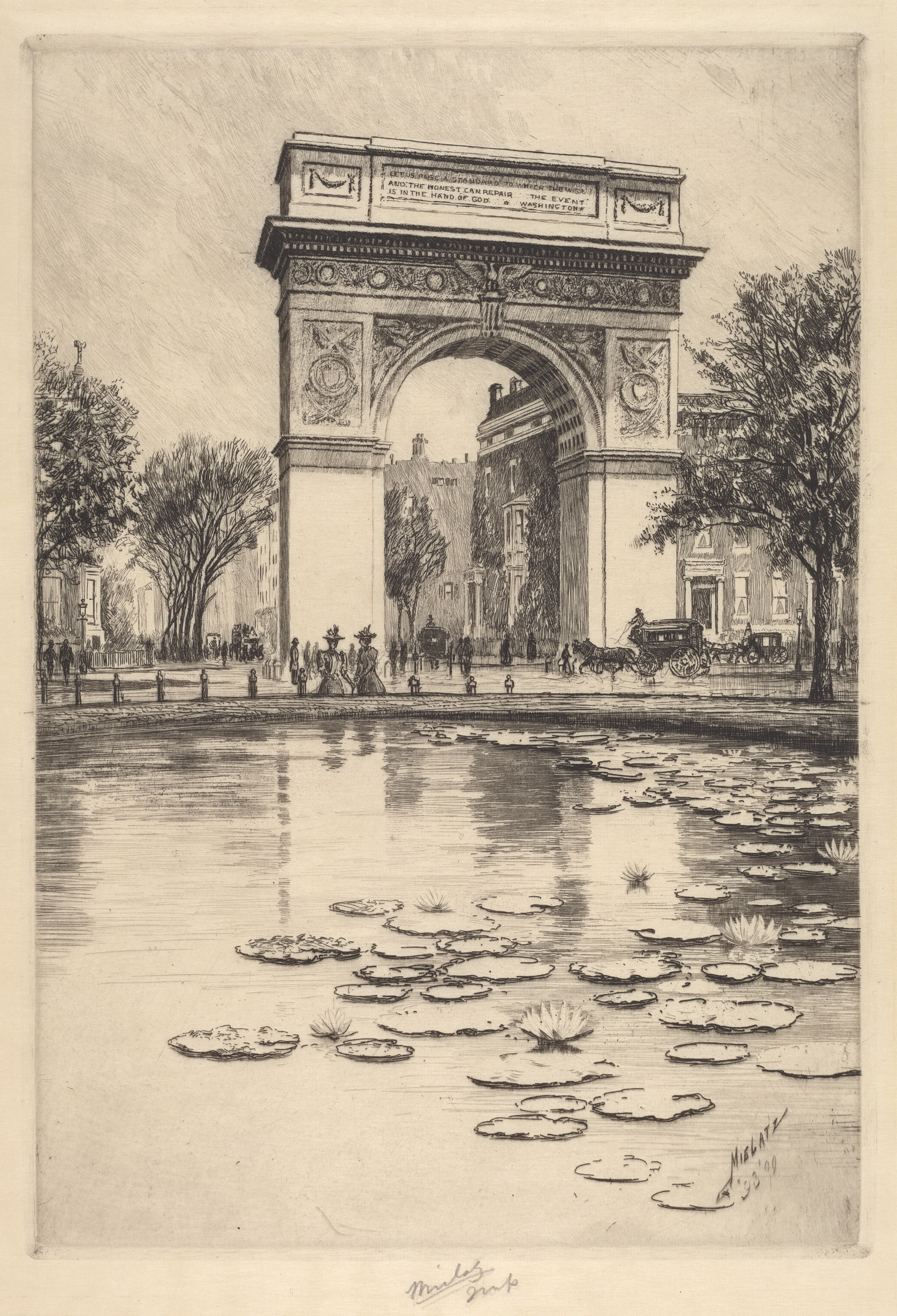
Washington Arch, 1909

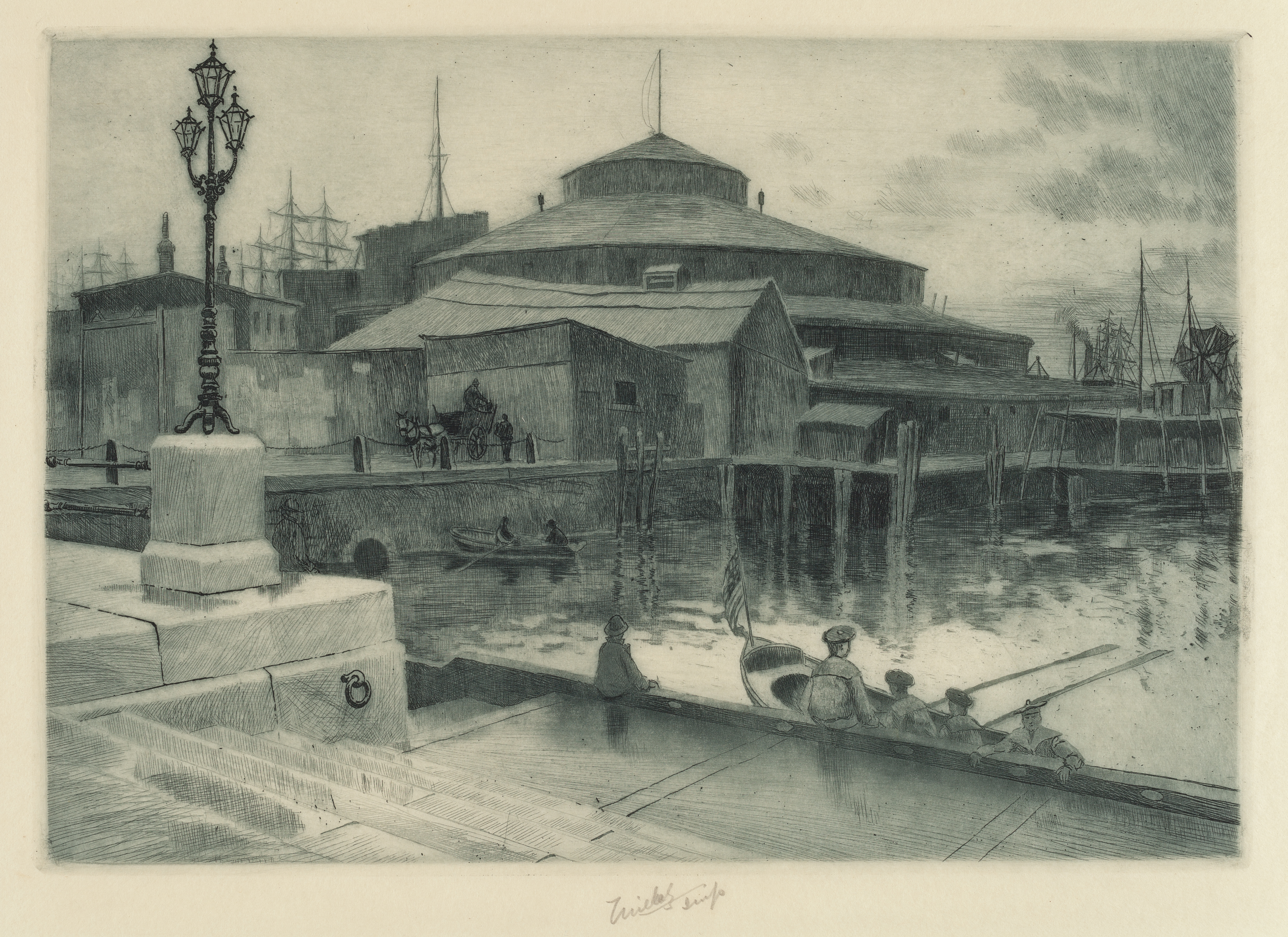
Castle Garden

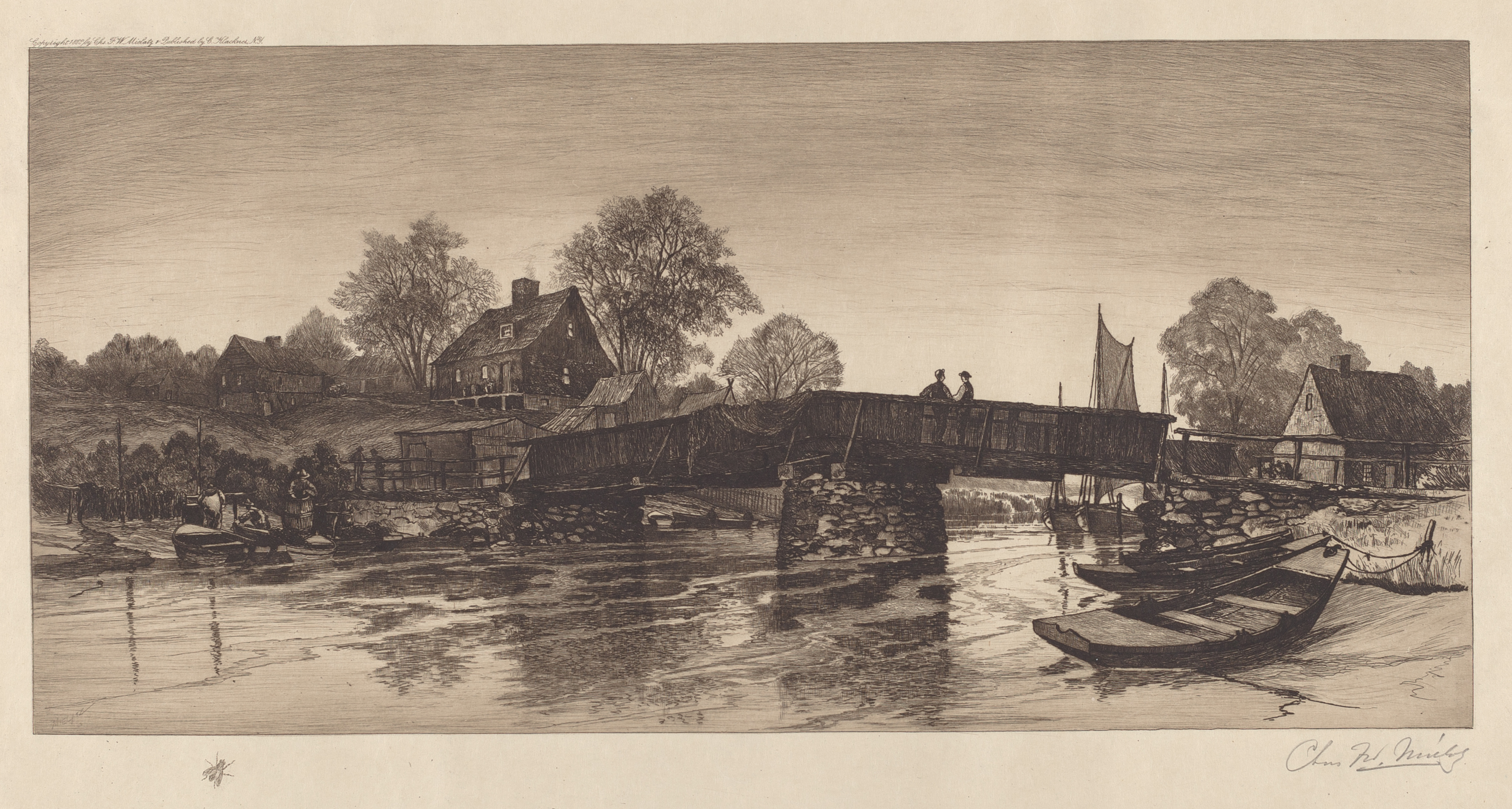
Untitled (Old Bridge), 1888

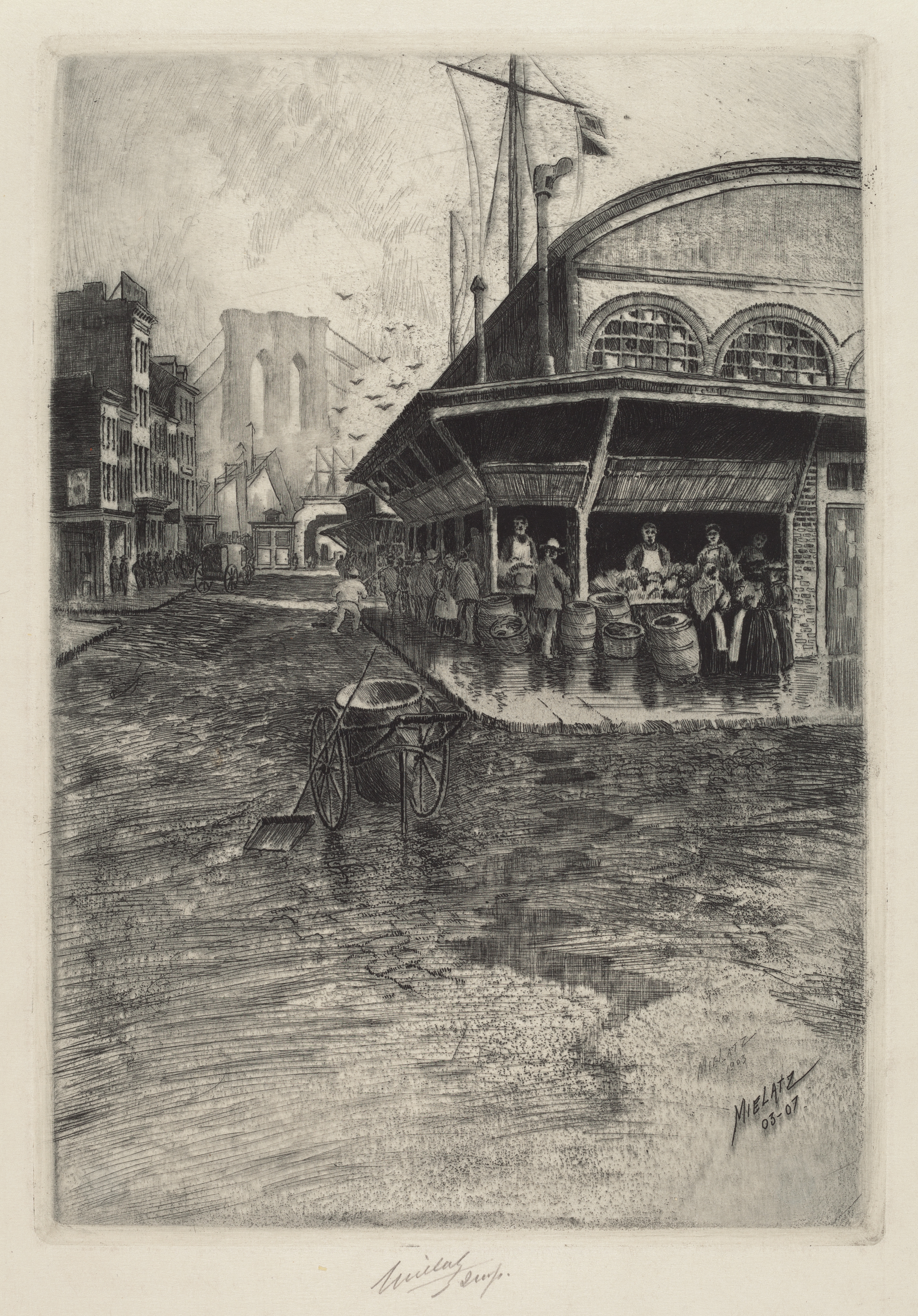
Catherine Market, 1903-1907

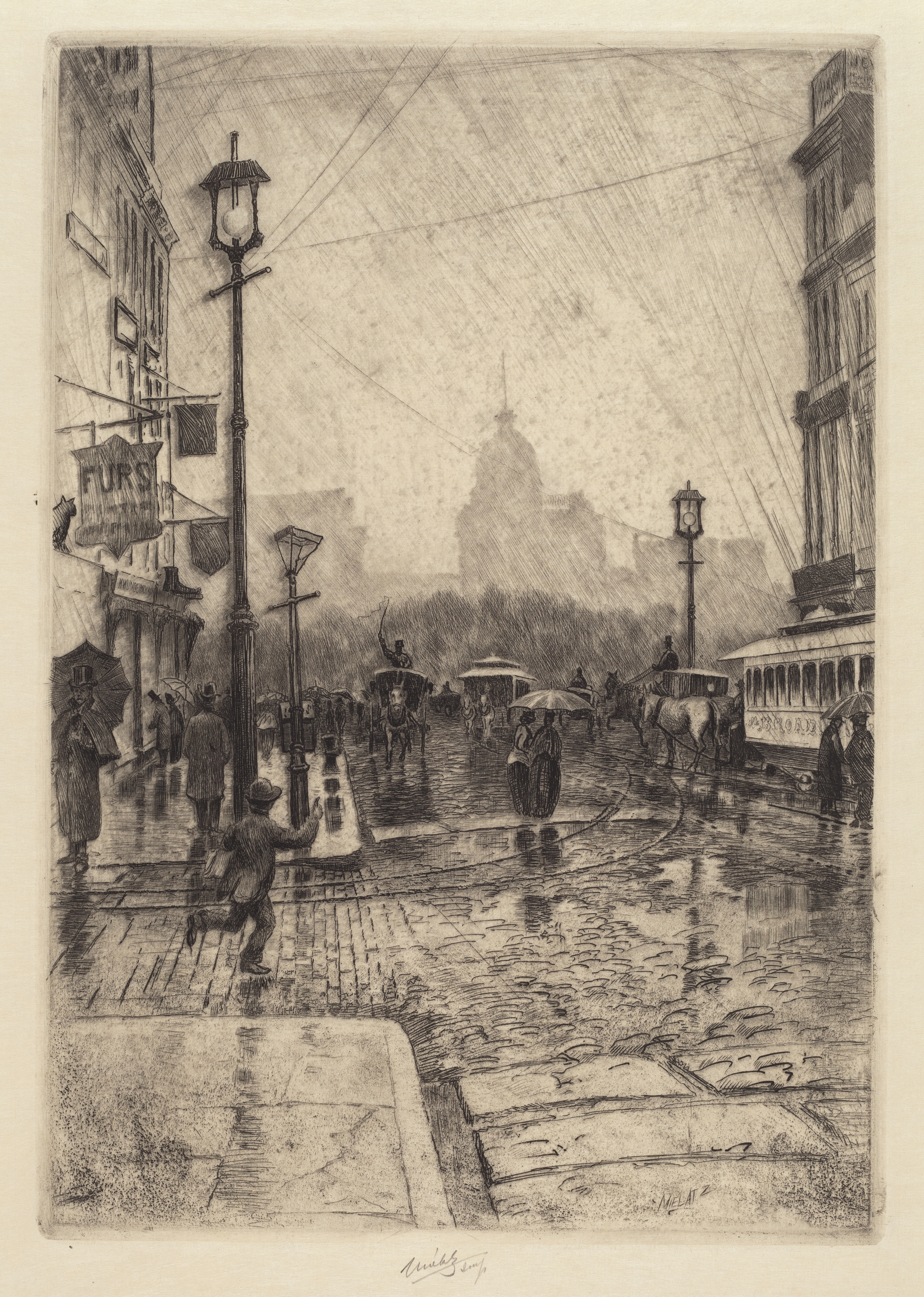
Rainy Day, Broadway, probably 1890

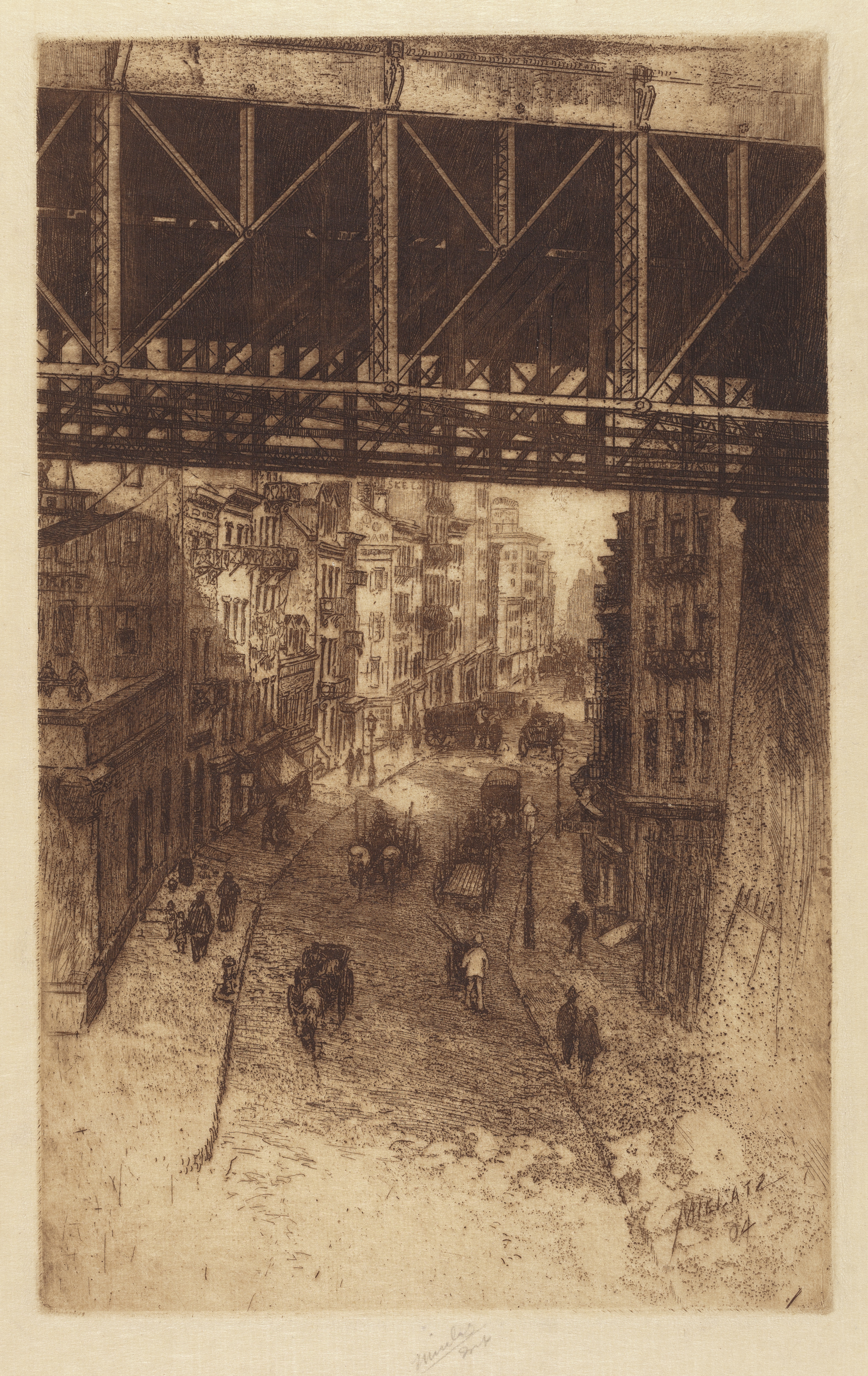
Cherry Street, N.Y., 1904

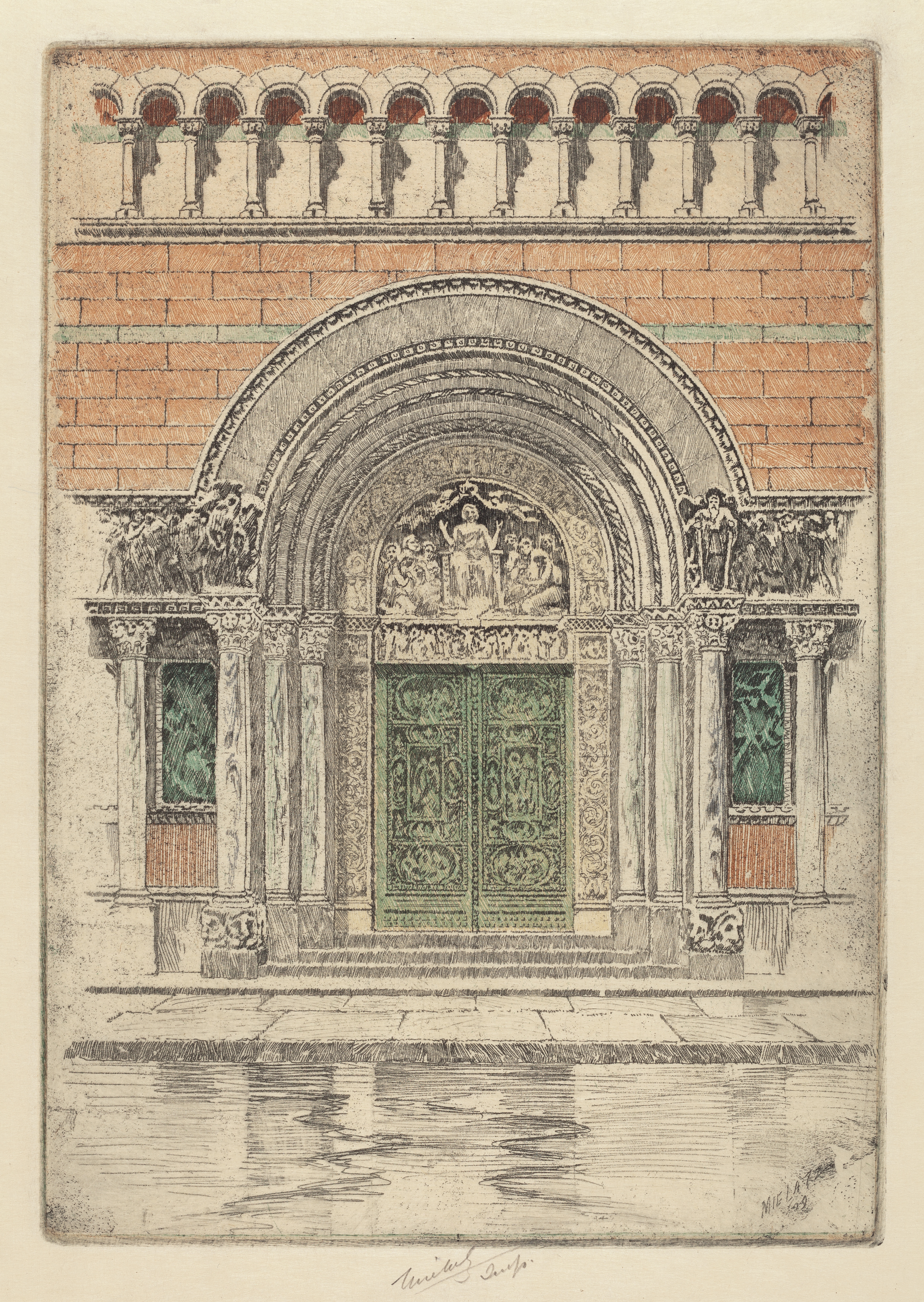
The Door, St. Bartholomew's, 1909

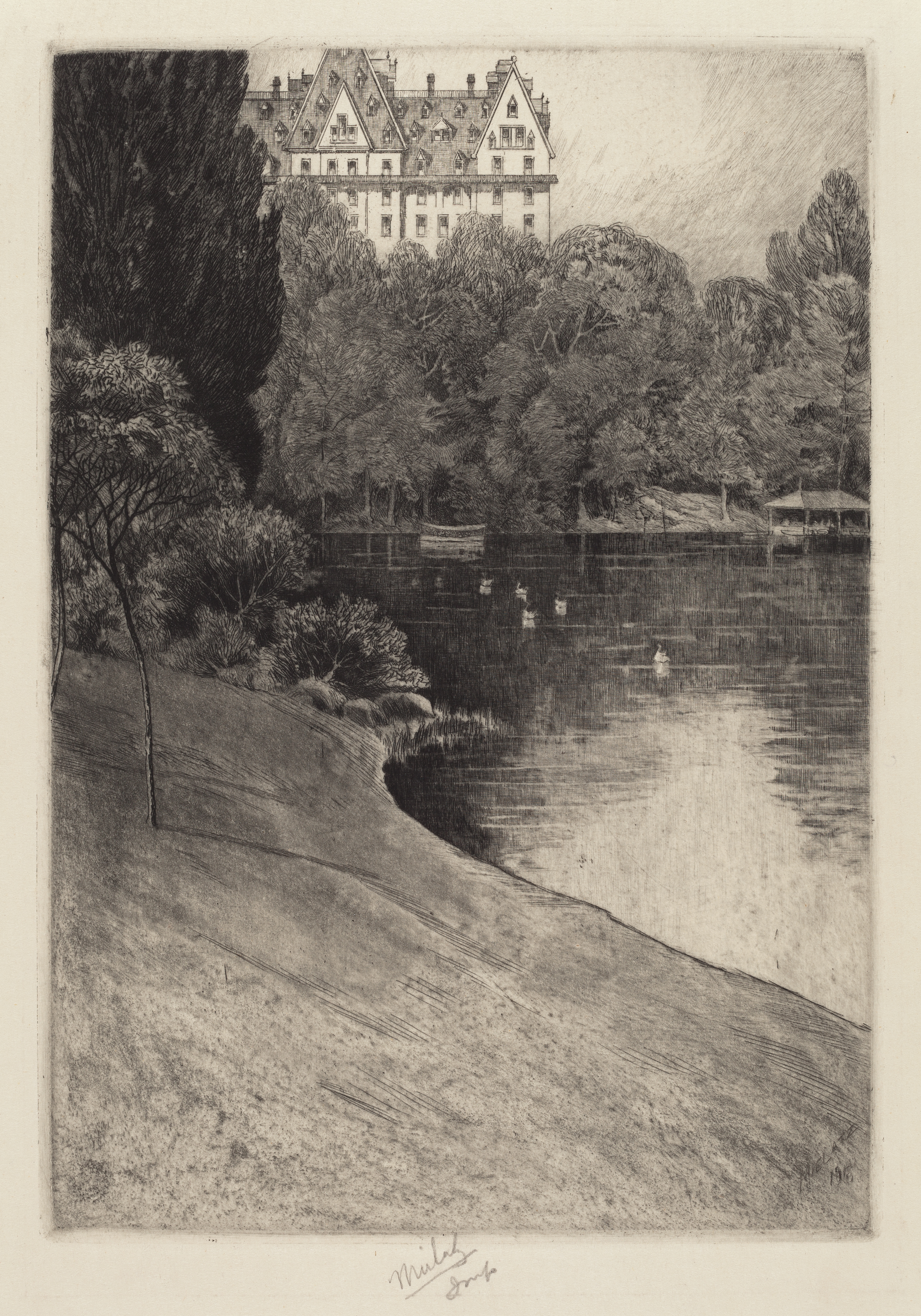
Bit of Central Park, probably 1918

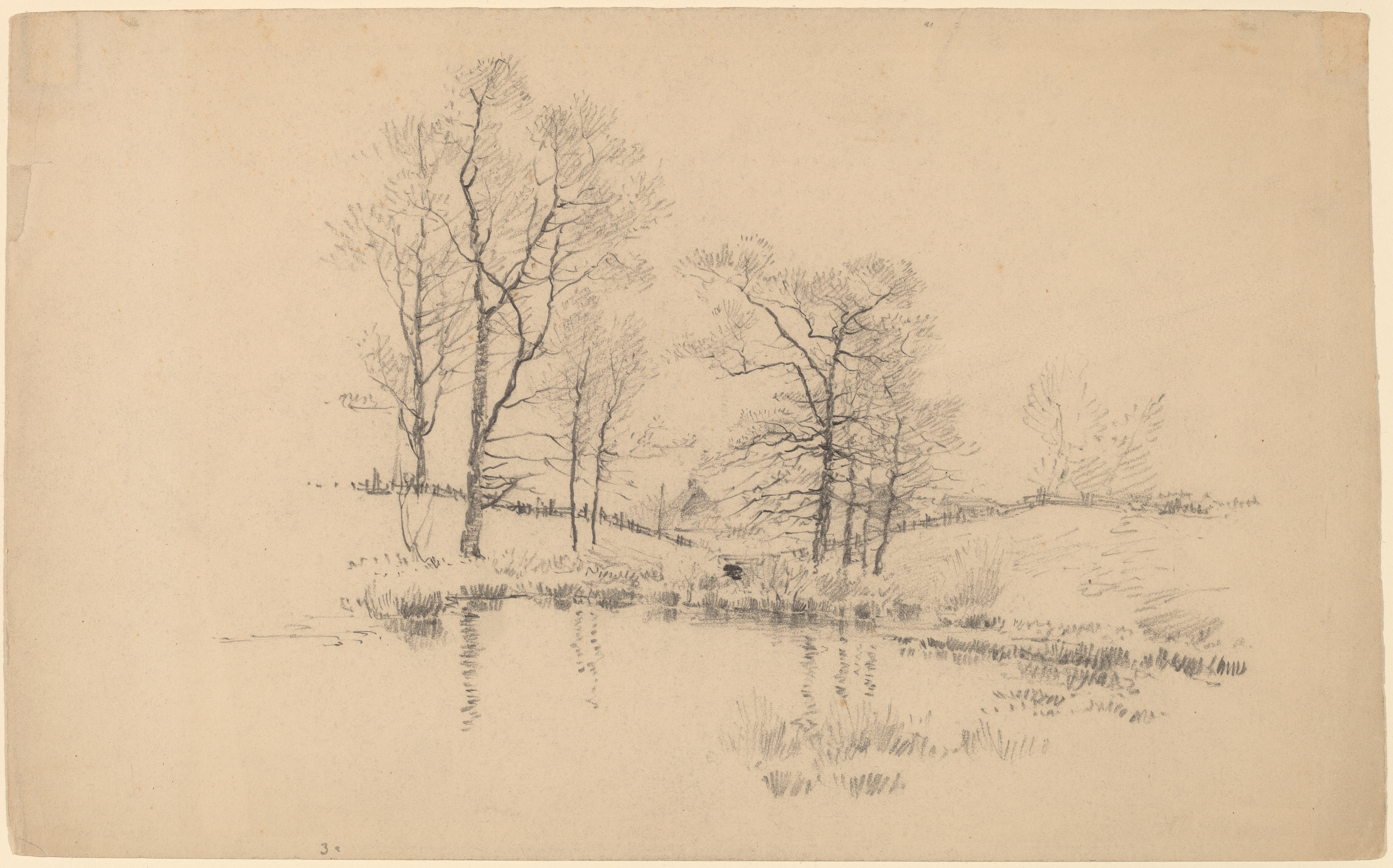
Meadow Pond, New York

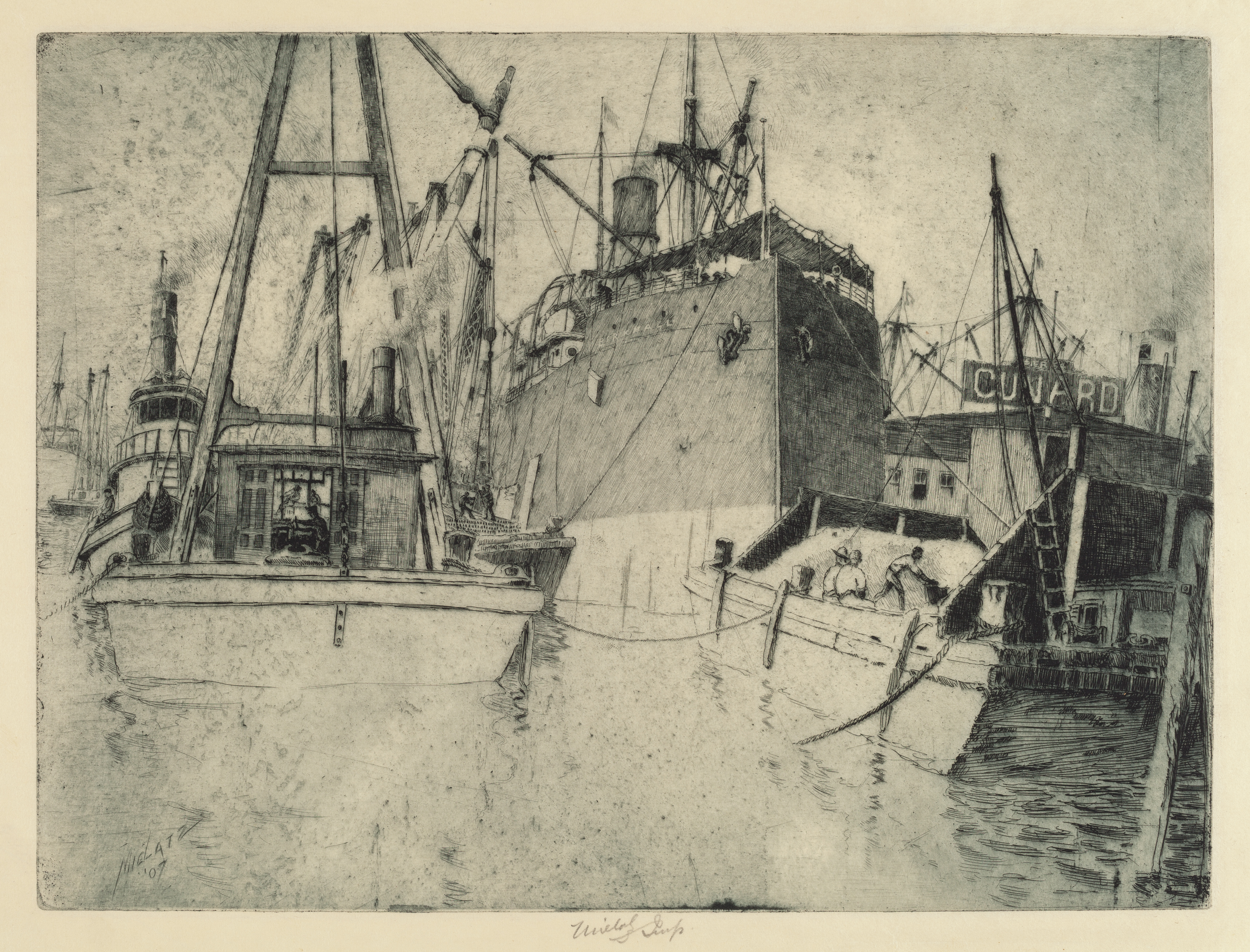
Chelsea Docks, Loading the Ship, 1907

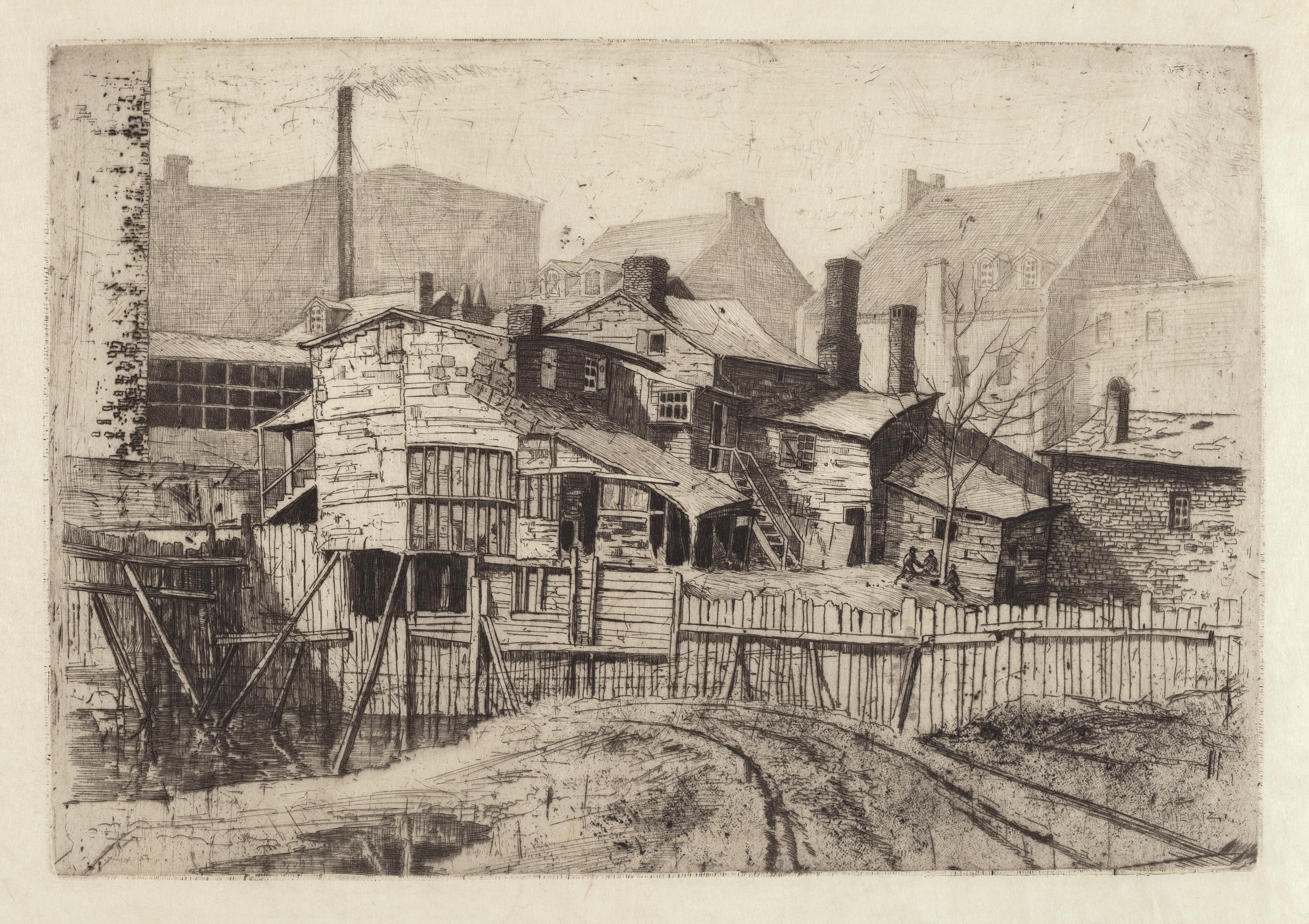
Untitled (Wooden House in City), 1880s

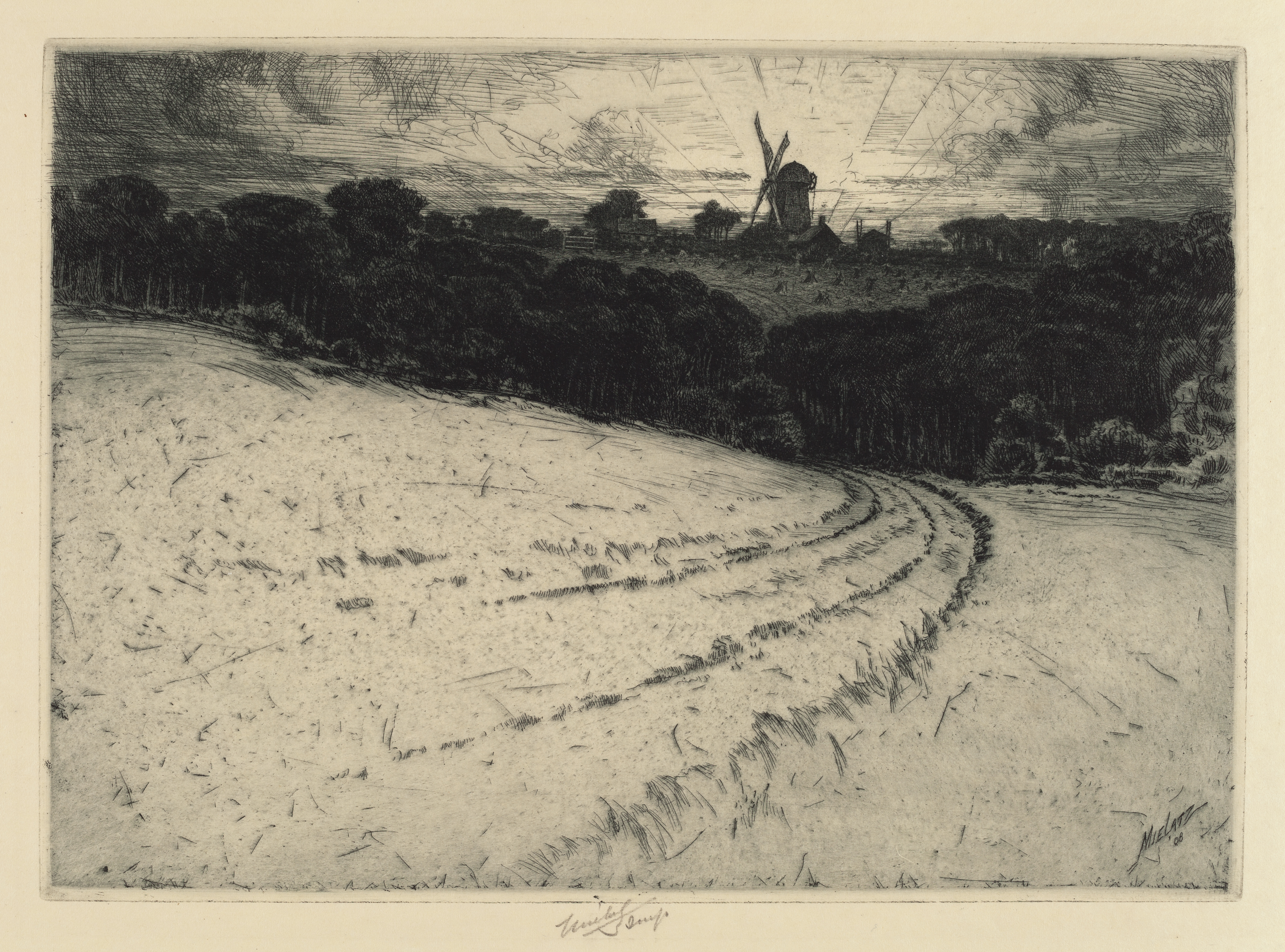
Morning, Canonicut Island, 1908

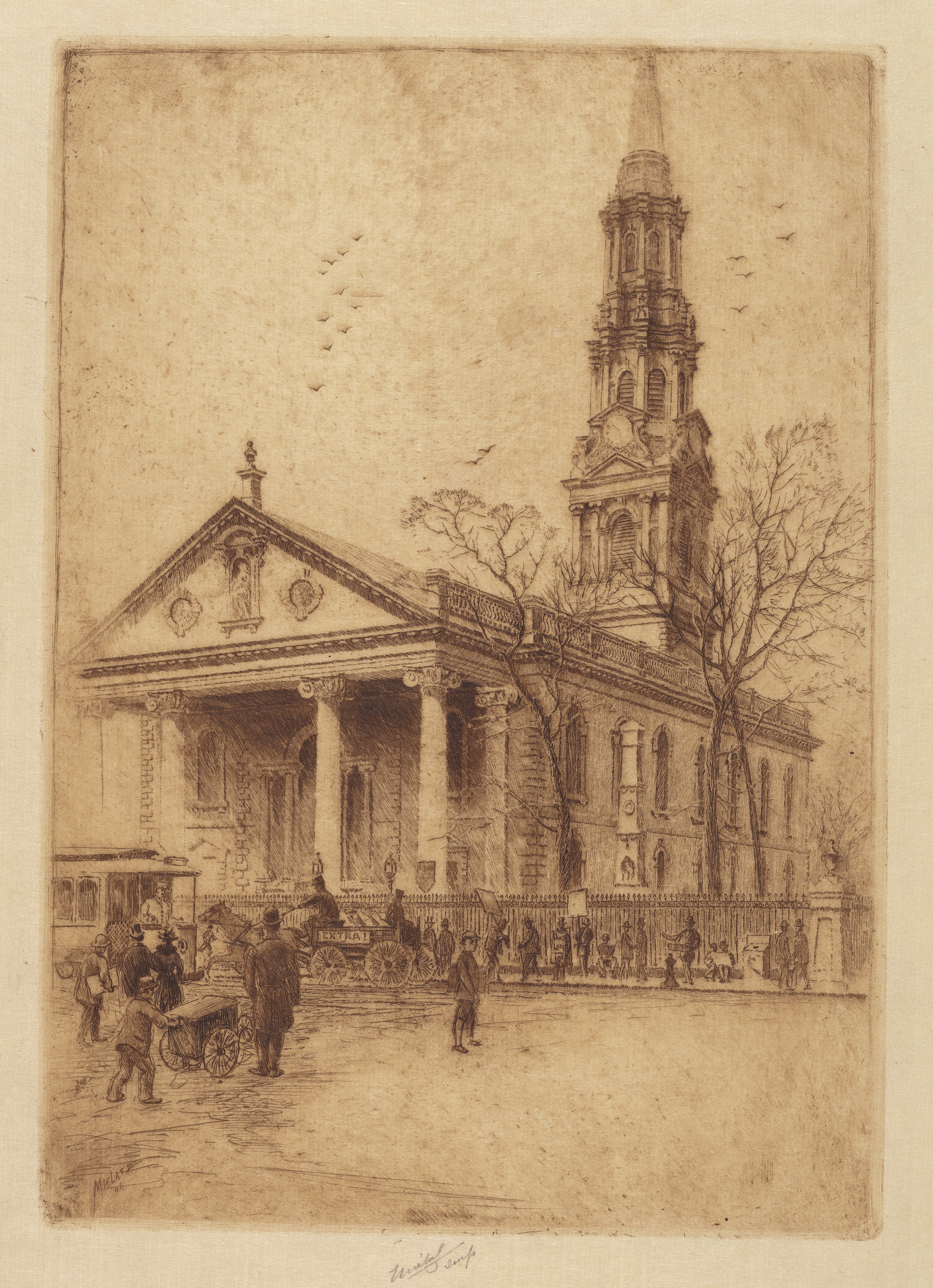
St. Paul's, Broadway, N.Y., 1906

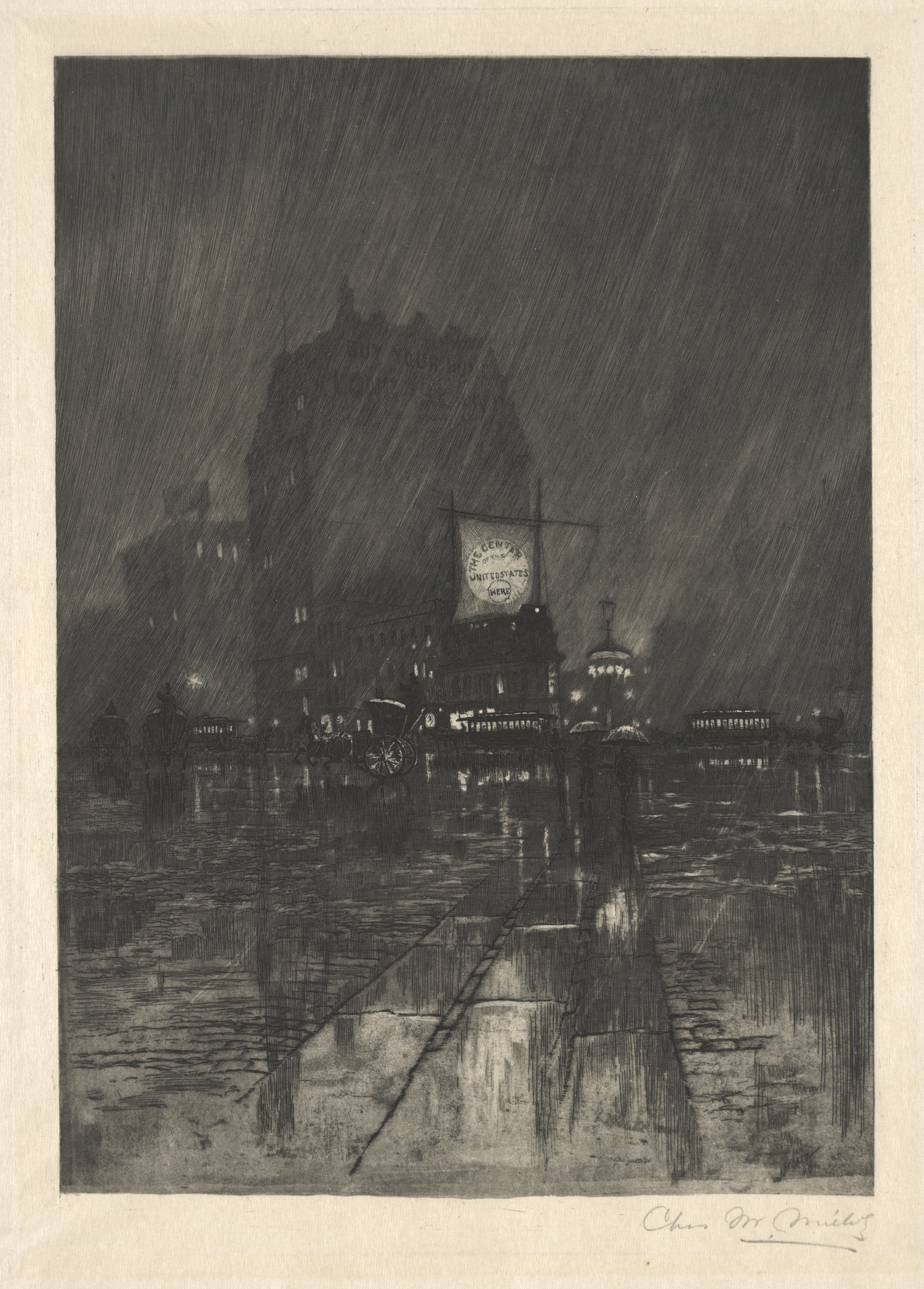
A Rainy Night, Madison Square, 1890

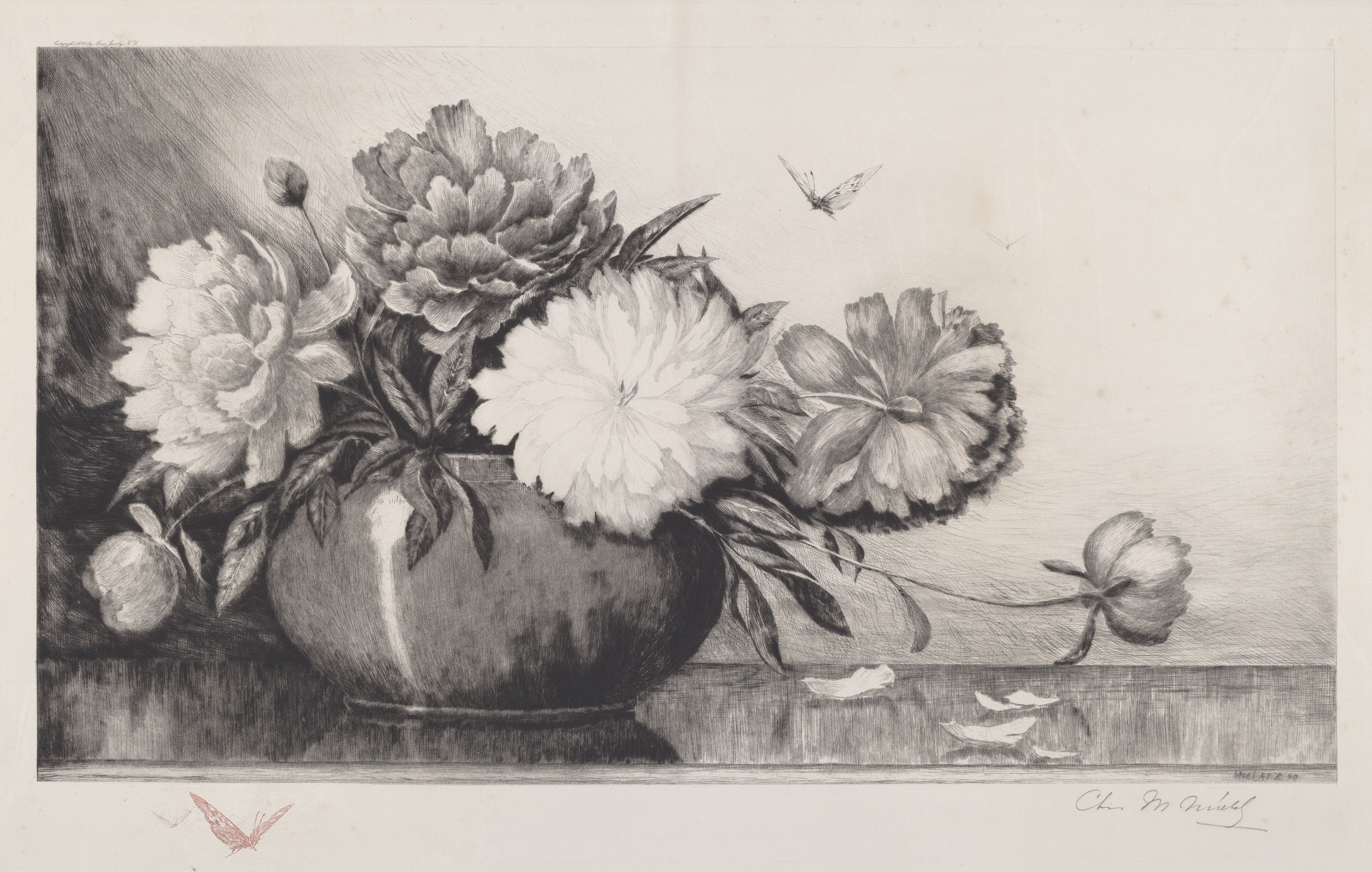
Untitled (Peonies in a Bowl), 1890

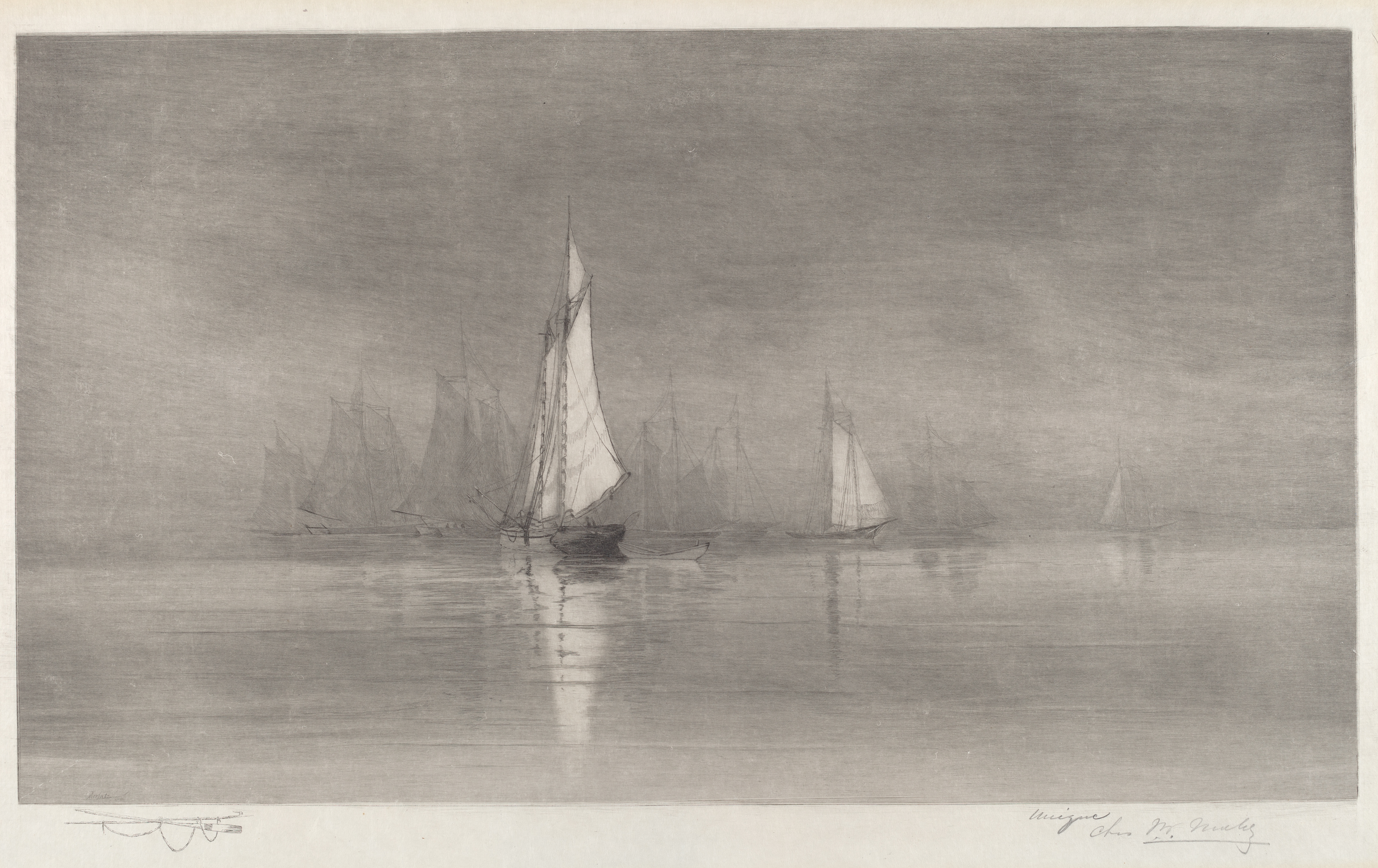
Untitled (Harbor Scene with Sailboats), c. 1900

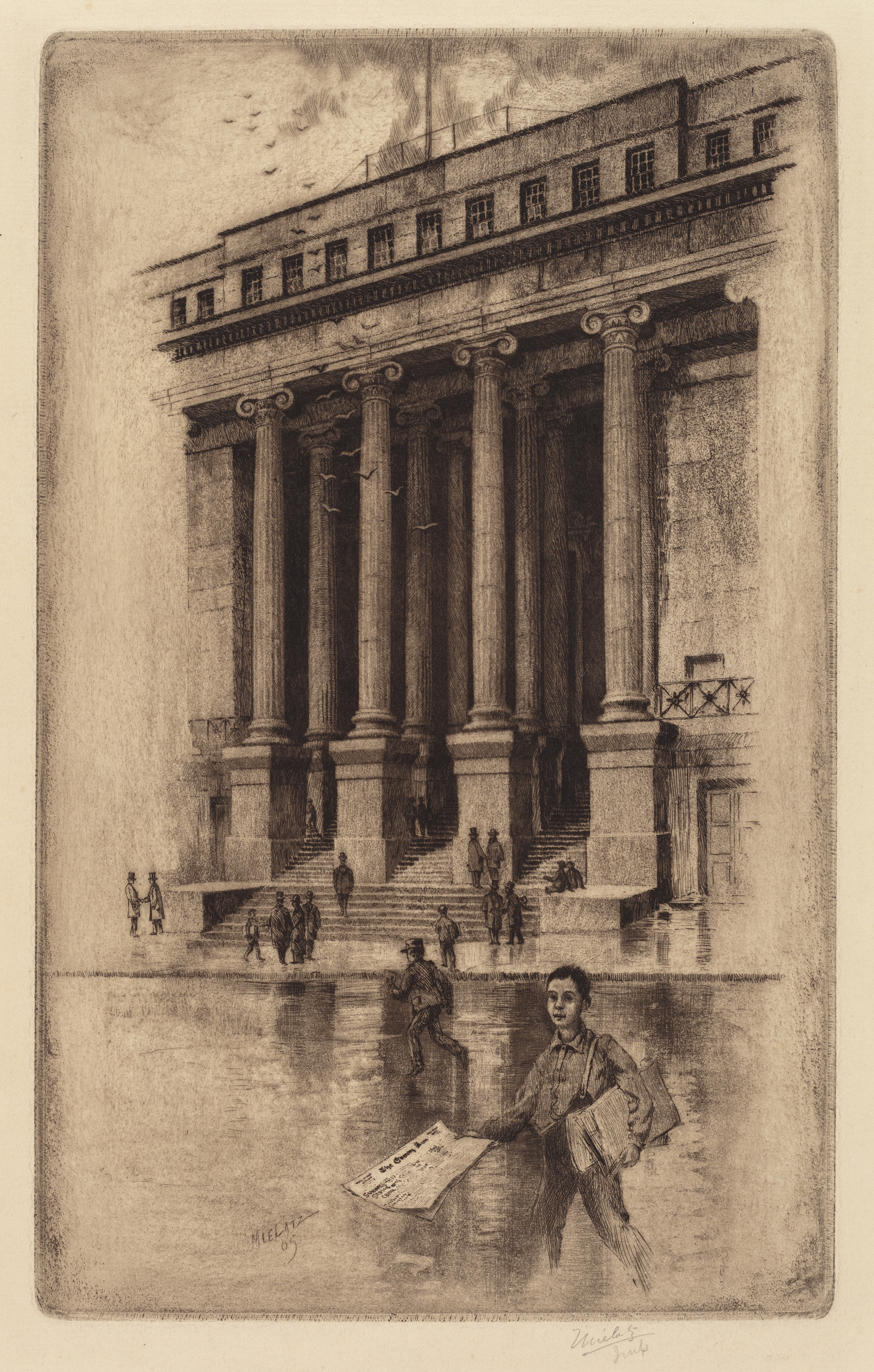
Porch, Old Custom House, Wall Street, 1905
