= Caroline Morgan Clowes =

19th-century American artist

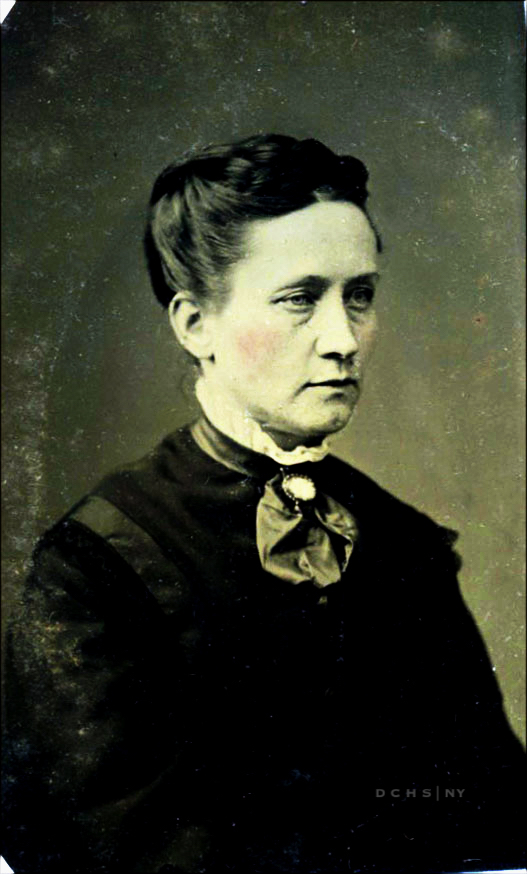
- Clowes, c. 1880
- Born: March 3, 1838; Hempstead, New York
- Died: November 16, 1904 (aged 66); LaGrange, New York, United States of America
- Known for: Painting Medium/Media: Oil on Canvas
- Notable work: Cattle at the Brook, The United States International Exhibition at Philadelphia, 1876
- Movement: Hudson River School

Caroline Morgan Clowes (March 3, 1838 – November 16, 1904) was a Hudson River School painter who, at a time when that particular style was declining in popularity, earned accolades by depicting farm animals, frequently cattle, drawn from the vicinity of the home of the extended family that had adopted her, Heartsease, in LaGrange, Dutchess County, New York.

== Childhood and family ==
The ancestors of Caroline Morgan Clowes were late 17th century settlers of Hempstead, Long Island, New York, where she was born in 1838. But soon after her birth, she, an older sister, Lydia Moore Clowes, and parents, William Jones Clowes and Elizabeth Ann Hart Clowes, relocated to near Monticello, New York so her father could attempt to capitalize on land claims in the Minisink Patent. Clowes was two years old when her mother died in 1840. The land claims were not being turned into any economically viable enterprise. By 1851, Clowes' older sister was being raised by a maternal aunt in Virginia. Caroline, herself, was raised by her maternal uncle, Benjamin Hall Hart and his wife, Elizabeth Nichols Hart, in LaGrange, Dutchess County, New York.

== Early work and education ==
Clowes was involved in the arts by age 16 when her drawings were exhibited in Poughkeepsie. She attended the Poughkeepsie Female Academy and studied under the noted Hudson River School painter, Frederick Rondel, when he took up residence in Poughkeepsie between 1863 and 1868 under commission to Matthew Vassar.

== Exhibition of work ==
Clowes' profile was raised dramatically after the end of the American Civil War. She was exhibiting at the National Academy of Design by 1865 and for well over a decade subsequently, while exhibiting in other major cities.

In 1872 in New York her work, "An Alarm," was exhibited at the National Academy of Design.

In 1876 in Philadelphia her work, "Cattle at the Brook," was exhibited at the United States International Exhibition.

In 1879 in London, three works, Spring, Autumn and Mountain Ash were exhibited at Royal Albert Hall of Arts and Sciences.

In 1879 at the Boston Museum of Fine Arts.

== Gallery ==
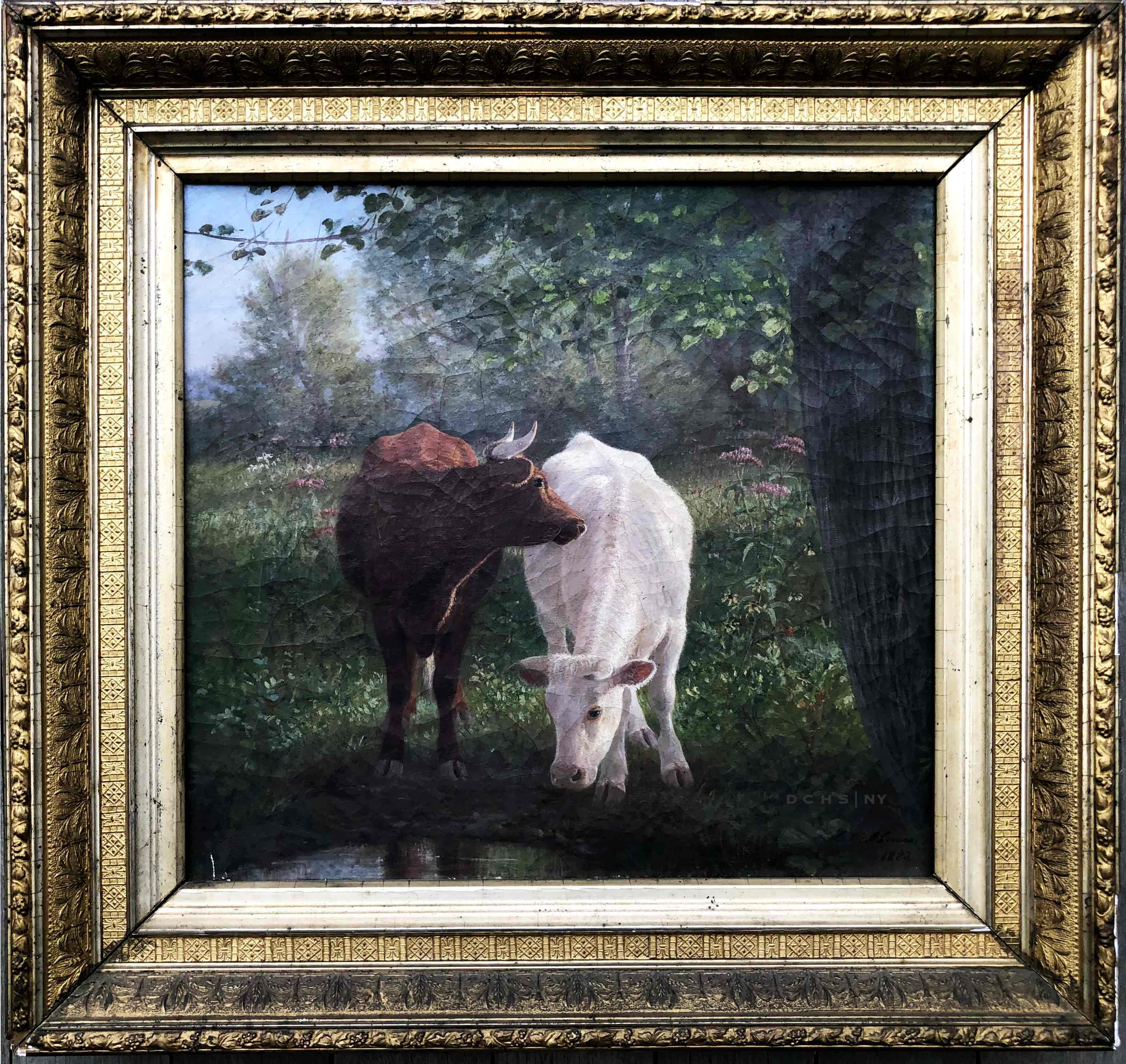
Two Cows at the Wappinger Creek, by C. M. Clowes, 1882. Typical subject and style.

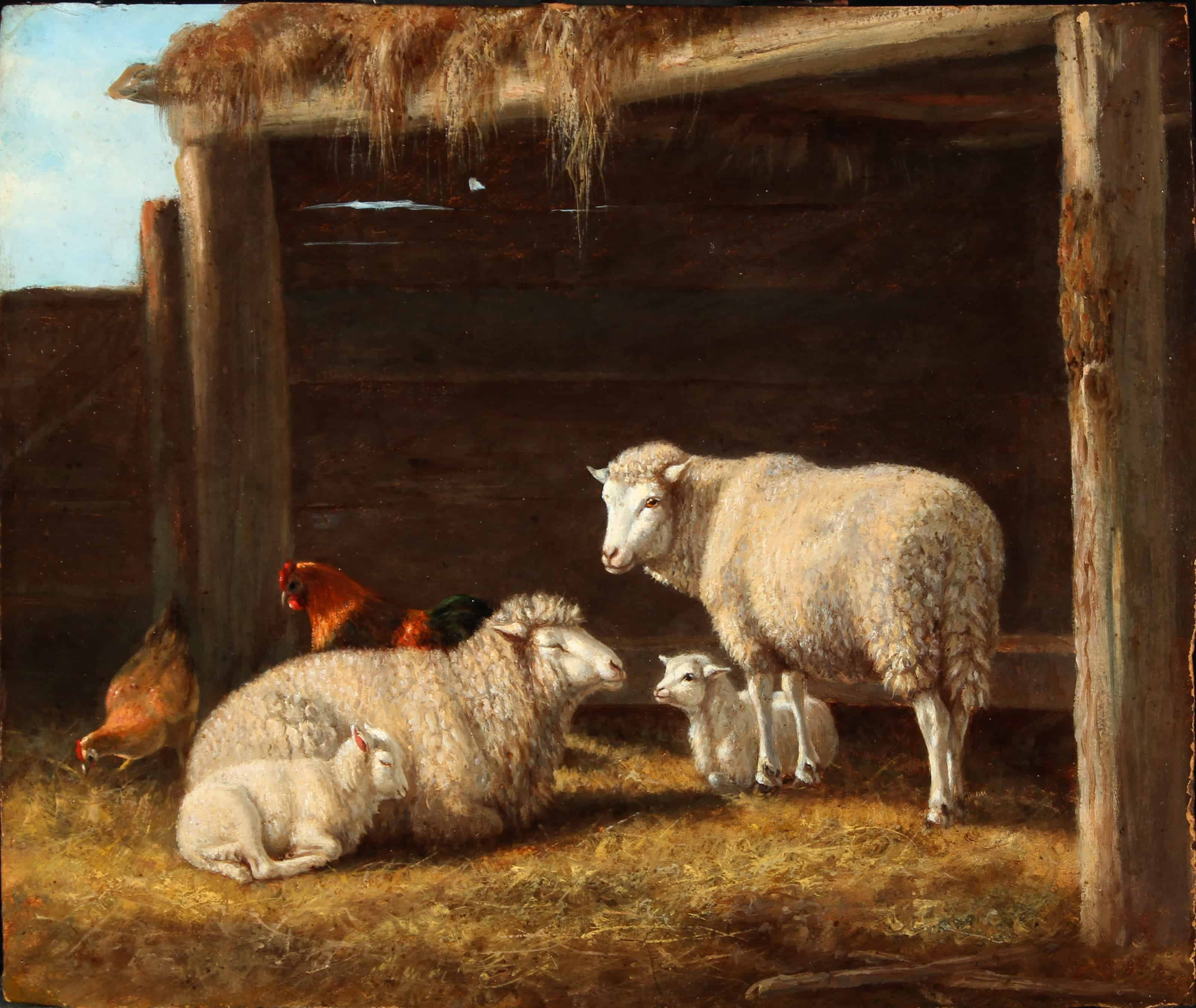
Sheep and chickens, by C. M. Clowes, no date

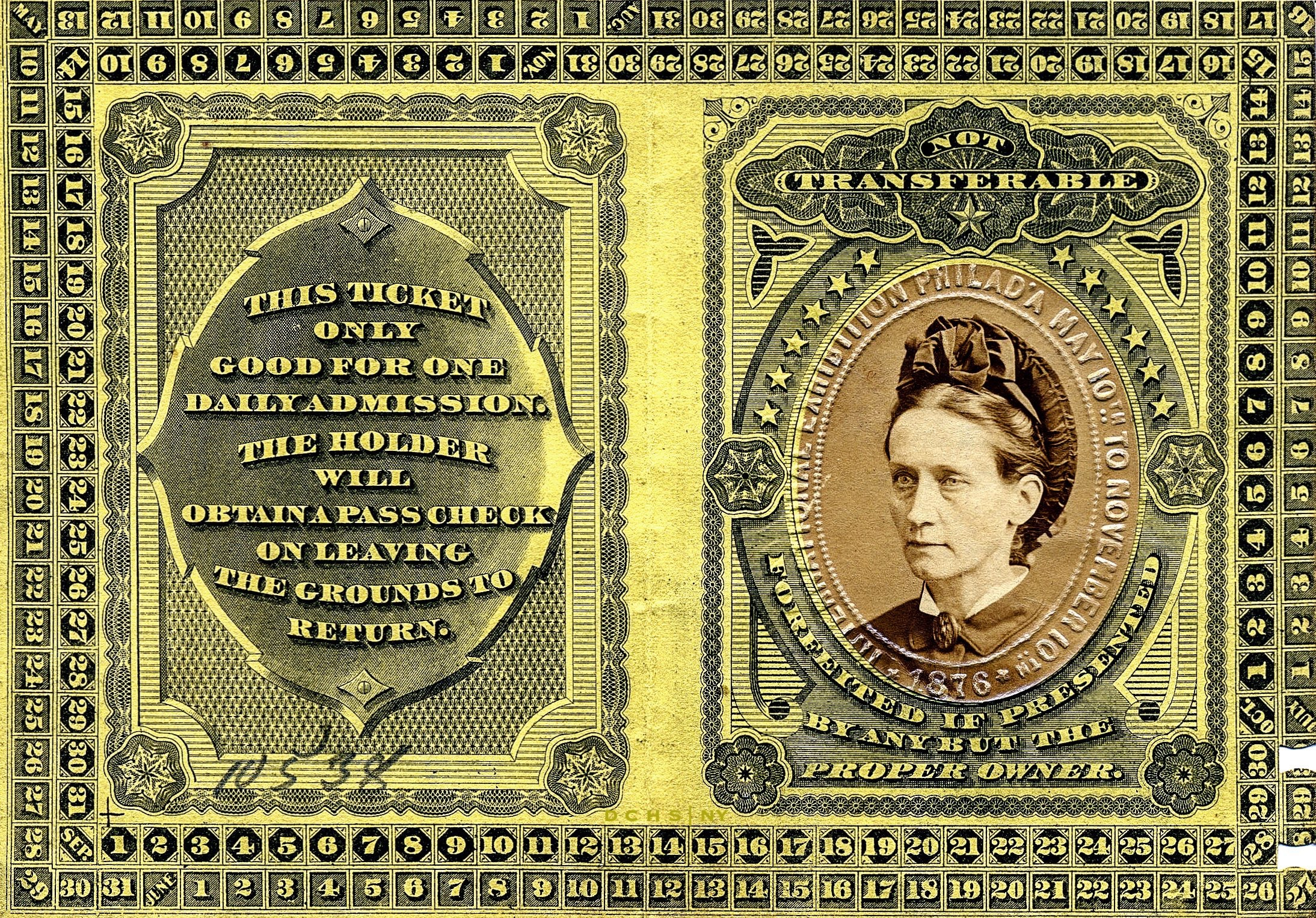
Exhibiter Pass for Philadelphia Exhibition for Miss Caroline Morgan Clowes.
