= Clow Island =

Island in Victoria Land, Antarctica

- Location within Antarctica

Geography
- Location: Antarctica
- Coordinates: 77°37′S 163°11′E

Administration
- Administered under the Antarctic Treaty System

Demographics
- Population: Uninhabited

Clow Island is an island 1.1 kilometres (0.6 nmi) long in the eastern part of Lake Fryxell in Taylor Valley, Victoria Land, Antarctica. This feature was a peninsula as recently as the 1980s when the rising level of the lake submerged the eastern part of the peninsula and created the island. It was named by the Advisory Committee on Antarctic Names (2000) after Gary D. Clow of the United States Geological Survey, who studied sand/ice interactions and sediment deposition in perennially ice-covered lakes in Taylor Valley, 1985–86, and glacier geophysics at Taylor Dome, 1993–94 through 1995–96.

== See also ==
- List of antarctic and sub-antarctic islands
