= Henry Clowes =

English cricketer (1863–1899)

Personal information
- Full name: Henry Clowes
- Born: 1 July 1863; Cheadle, Cheshire, England
- Died: 6 April 1899 (aged 35); Bloomsbury, London, England
- Batting: Right-handed
- Role: Occasional wicket-keeper

Domestic team information
- Years: Team
- 1884: Gloucestershire

Career statistics
Competition	First-class
Matches	4
Runs scored	82
Batting average	10.25
100s/50s	–/–
Top score	22
Balls bowled	–
Wickets	–
Bowling average	–
5 wickets in innings	–
10 wickets in match	–
Best bowling	–
Catches/stumpings	1/–
- Source: Cricinfo, 29 January 2012

Henry Clowes (1 July 1863 – 6 April 1899) was an English cricketer. Born at Cheadle, Cheshire and educated at Cheltenham College, Clowes was a right-handed batsman and occasional wicket-keeper.

Clowes made his first-class debut for Gloucestershire against Sussex in 1884. He made three further first-class appearances for the county in that season, the last of which again came against Sussex. In his four first-class appearances for Gloucestershire, Clowes scored a total of 82 runs at an average of 10.25, with a high score of 22.

He died at Bloomsbury, London on 6 April 1899.
