= Clow (surname) =

Clow is a surname. Notable people with the surname include:

- Cheney Clow (1734–1788), American loyalist
- Herbert Clow (1899–1977), American football player
- James Clow (1790–1861), minister
- Andrew Clow (1890–1957), British colonial governor
- Lee Clow (born 1943), American advertising executive
- Ross Clow, New Zealand politician
