= Ling-Temco-Vought =

U.S. conglomerate

The LTV Corporation
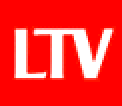
- Formerly: Ling-Temco-Vought
- Type: Public
- Traded as: LTV / LTVCQ (former)
- Industry: Conglomerate
- Founded: 1947; 79 years ago Dallas, Texas U.S.
- Founder: James Ling
- Defunct: December 18, 2001
- Headquarters: Dallas, Texas (1947–1993); Cleveland, Ohio (1993–2001)
- Area served: Worldwide
- Number of employees: <20,000 (1961)
- Website: ltvsteel.com (2000 Archive, now defunct)

Ling-Temco-Vought (LTV) was a large American conglomerate which existed from 1961 to 2001. At its peak, it was involved in aerospace, airlines, electronics, steel manufacturing, sporting goods, meat packing, car rentals, and pharmaceuticals, among other businesses.

It began in 1947 as Ling Electric Company, later named Ling-Temco-Vought, followed by LTV Corporation and eventually LTV Steel until its end in 2001.

== History ==
=== Ling Electric Company ===
In 1947, entrepreneur James Ling founded an electrical-contracting business, Ling Electric Company, in Dallas, Texas. He lived in the rear of the shop. After incorporating and taking the company public in 1955, Ling found innovative ways to market the stock, including selling door-to-door and from a booth at the State Fair of Texas.

=== Ling-Temco-Vought ===
In 1956, Ling bought L.M. Electronics, and in 1959, added Altec Electronics, a maker of stereo systems and speakers. In 1960, Ling merged the company with Temco Aircraft, best known for its missile work. In 1961, using additional funding from insurance businessman Troy Post and Texas oil baron David Harold Byrd, they acquired Chance Vought aerospace in a hostile takeover. The new company became Ling-Temco-Vought.

With low interest rates allowing the company to borrow huge sums, Ling built one of the major 1960s conglomerates. As long as the target company's earnings exceeded the interest on the loan (or corporate bond), or the company's price/earnings ratio was less than that of Ling-Temco-Vought's stock, the conglomerate became more profitable overall. Given the fairly unsophisticated stock research of the era, the company appeared to be growing without bound, and its share price rose.

In 1964, Ling turned Ling-Temco-Vought into a holding company and established three public companies as subsidiaries, LTV Aerospace, LTV Ling Altec, and LTV Electrosystems. LTV Aerospace received assets for Vought and a large part of Temco Aircraft. LTV Ling Altec contained Altec Electronics and other properties, and the rest went to LTV Electrosystems. The intention was to make the sum of the parts appear to be worth more than the whole. Ling used this technique to raise capital and buy more companies. Portions of LTV Electrosystems were later spun off to E-Systems, then part of Raytheon IIS, and since 2002, part of L-3 Communications-Integrated Systems (L-3/IS).

==== Acquisitions ====
In 1965, Ling added the wire and cable company Okonite. In 1967, they took over Wilson and Company, which was twice the size of Ling-Temco-Vought. Wilson was a diverse company involved in meat packing, sporting goods, and pharmaceuticals. Wilson's president Roscoe Haynie was not aware of the takeover scheme until two weeks before the takeover was complete. Ling later split Wilson into three parts (meat packing, sporting goods (Wilson Sporting Goods), and pharmaceuticals (Wilson Pharmaceutical and Chemical), and spun them off into separate companies traded on the American Stock Exchange.

In 1968, Ling-Temco-Vought added Greatamerica Corporation, Troy Post's holding company for Braniff International Airways and National Car Rental, and J & L Steel. In addition, it acquired resorts in Acapulco and Guerrero, Mexico, and Steamboat Springs, Colorado. By 1969, LTV had purchased 33 companies, employed 29,000 workers, and offered 15,000 separate products and services, and was one of the 40 biggest industrial corporations.

==== Conglomerate and antitrust problems ====
Ling-Temco-Vought had a combined sales of $3.6 billion in 1969 ($31.6 billion today), but investors found that the conglomerates were not growing any faster than the individual companies had before they were bought out. Share prices plummeted, sparking a downward market, and a general feeling arose that conglomerates were to blame for the market woes. An antitrust lawsuit was filed that year.

Eventually, the board of directors demoted James Ling in 1970, and he left the company, to be replaced by former Ling-Temco-Vought executive Paul Thayer.

=== LTV Corporation ===
As part of a 1971 antitrust settlement, the company sold its Braniff and Okonite components, and Thayer changed the company name from Ling-Temco-Vought to LTV Corporation. Thayer was succeeded by former Xerox executive Raymond Hay.

==== First bankruptcy ====
In July 1986, LTV Corporation filed for Chapter 11 bankruptcy protection. With $6.14 billion ($18 billion today) in total assets and $4.59 billion in debt, it was the largest bankruptcy in US history to that point.

The company went into a series of divestitures, most notably the entire LTV Aerospace division; the aerospace component retained the legacy Vought name as the independent Vought Corporation, while the missile component later became part of Loral Corporation and later became the Lockheed Martin Missiles and Fire Control division. After the 1984 merger of the Jones and Laughlin Steel Company subsidiary with Republic Steel Corporation, the company continued to exist primarily as a steel producer, renaming itself LTV Steel, and moved its headquarters to Cleveland, Ohio, in 1993.

LTV did not leave Chapter 11 bankruptcy protection until June 28, 1993, in what was described in 1999 as one of the longest and most complicated bankruptcies in US history.

In 1999, LTV acquired Pittsburgh-based Copperweld Corporation from Imétal S.A. of France.

==== Second bankruptcy ====
LTV Steel filed for Chapter 11 bankruptcy protection, on December 29, 2000. The company subsequently dissolved on December 18, 2001. Its assets were acquired in February 2002 by Wilbur Ross and merged with Weirton Steel to form the International Steel Group.

Some of the railroad subsidiaries – Chicago Short Line Railway, Cuyahoga Valley Railway, and River Terminal Railway – went to ISG Railways, while the Ohio Central Railroad System acquired Aliquippa and Southern Railroad and Mahoning Valley Railway. The former Monongahela Connecting Railroad is now operated by the Allegheny Valley Railroad.

In 2002, Lombard Metals Corp, located in Bala Cynwyd, Pennsylvania, purchased all the outside inventory totaling 224,000,000 lb of steel from 58 locations throughout the country.

== Headquarters buildings ==
A new office building was built at 1600 Pacific Avenue in downtown Dallas to house the operations of LTV, as well as a bank and other offices. The building opened in 1964. After LTV departed its offices there in the 1980s, the building went to other owners and various tenants before being repurposed in 2015 with a Hilton Garden Inn hotel on the building's lower floors, while the upper floors were made into residential apartments. With reference to the building's history and previous tenants, the apartments were dubbed the LTV Tower Apartments. The building's new owners used the letters of the name to create a promotional tagline for the property: "Love The View".

LTV spent its later years in Dallas in a new complex, LTV Center, which opened in 1985 at 2001 Ross Avenue. After LTV departed its headquarters for Cleveland, the building was renamed the Trammell Crow Tower; it is now Trammell Crow Center.

== Products ==
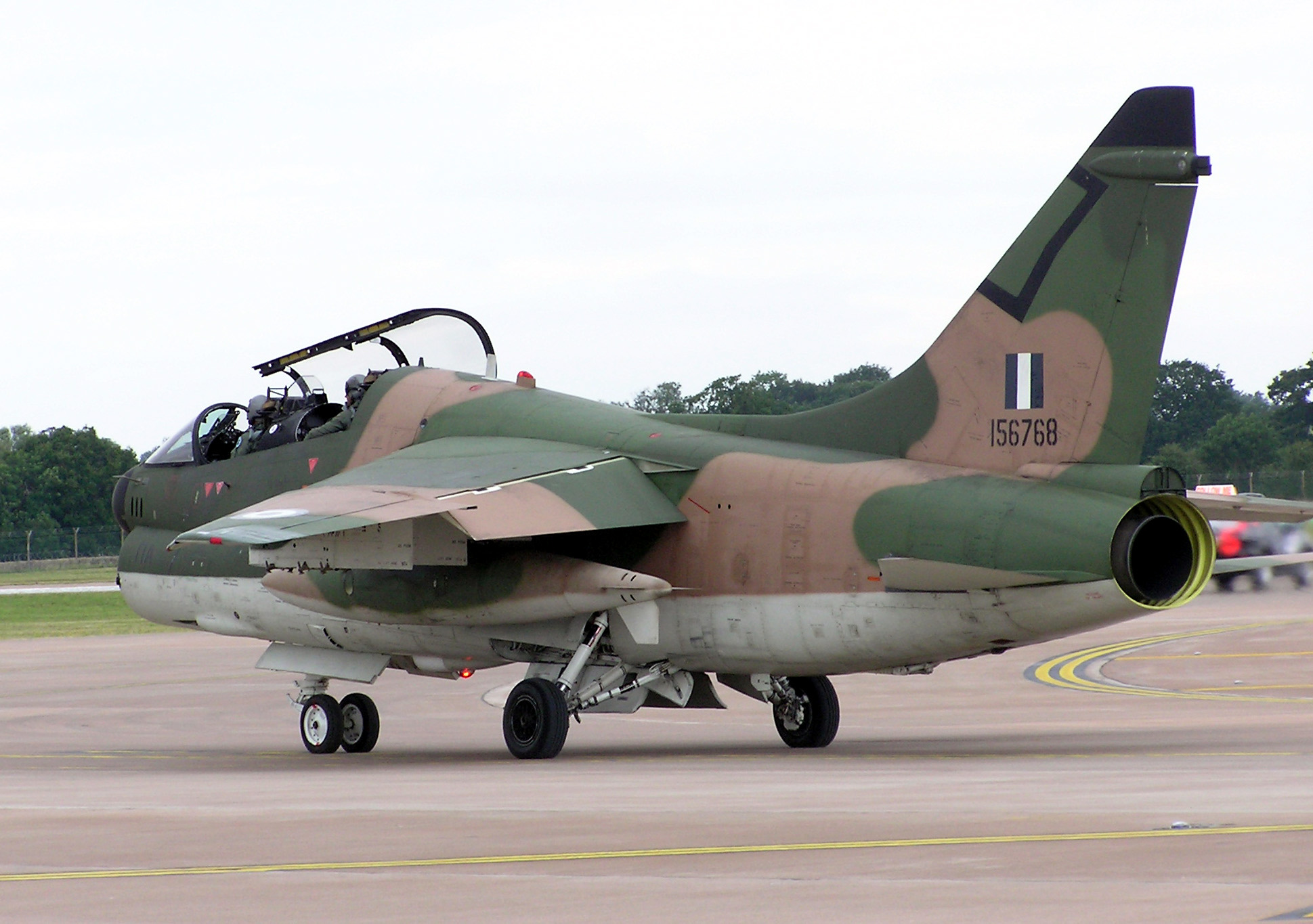
A-7 Corsair II aircraft made by Ling-Temco-Vought. This example, a former US Navy aircraft, was photographed at a British airshow in 2005. It was retired from service by 2014 from the Greek air force.

=== Aircraft ===
- LTV A-7 Corsair II
  - Vought YA-7F
- LTV XC-142
- LTV L450F
- Vought Model 1600

=== Missiles ===
- MGM-52 Lance
- ASM-135 ASAT
- Vought HVM
- MGM-140 ATACMS

=== Unmanned aerial vehicles ===
- LTV XQM-93
