= Schuyler Wheeler =

American electrical engineer and manufacturer

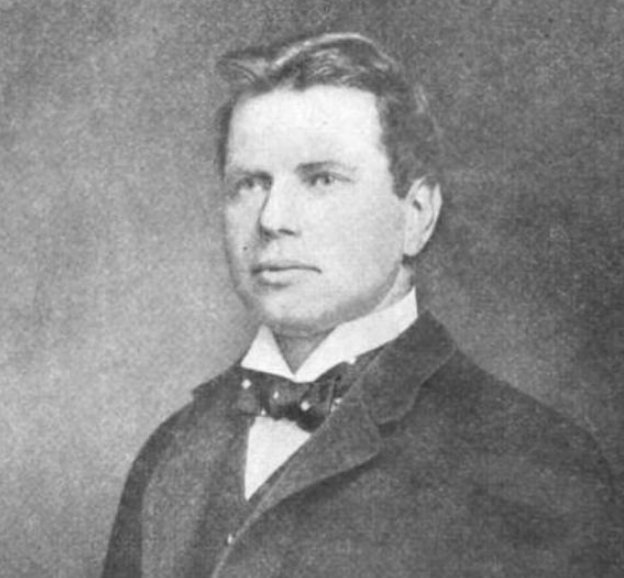
- Wheelen c. 1914
- Born: Schuyler Skaats Wheeler; May 17, 1860; New York City, U.S.
- Died: April 20, 1923 (aged 62); Manhattan, New York, U.S.
- Occupation: Electrical engineer
- Spouse: Amy Sutton

Schuyler Skaats Wheeler (May 17, 1860 – April 20, 1923) was an American electrical engineer and manufacturer who invented the electric fan, an electric elevator design, and the electric fire engine. He is associated with the early development of the electric motor industry, especially to do with training the blind in this industry for gainful employment. He helped develop and implement a code of ethics for electrical engineers and was associated with the electrical field in one way or another for over thirty years.

== Early life and genealogy ==
Wheeler was born in New York City on May 17, 1860. He was the son of James Edwin and Ann Wood (Skaats) Wheeler. His father, a lawyer in New York city, was the son of Aaron Reed Wheeler, a land speculator of Waterloo, New York, who came originally from Blackstone, Massachusetts. Wheeler's mother was the daughter of David Schuyler Skaats, the president of the First National Bank of Waterloo, New York. Skaats was an eighth generation descendant of Dominie Gideon Skaats, who had settled in Albany, New York, prior to 1650.

== Mid life and career ==
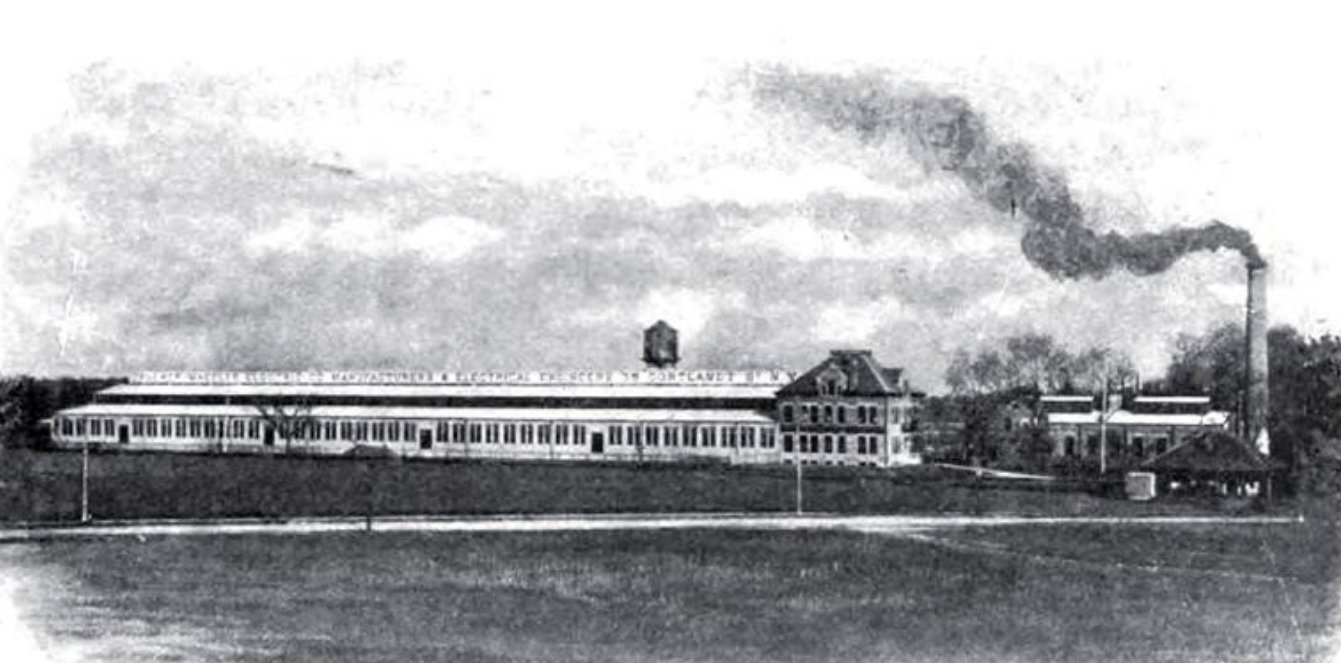
Crocker-Wheeler Electric Company in the Ampere District of East Orange, New Jersey, c. 1898

Wheeler was educated at Columbia Grammar & Preparatory School. Leaving college in 1881, upon the death of his father, he became assistant electrician of the Jablochkov Electric Lighting Company. Wheeler then joined the United21 States Electric Lighting Company in 1883 when Jablochkov went out of business with his electric company. He joined the engineering staff of Thomas A. Edison and was part of the project when the Pearl Street Station debuted the first incandescent light bulbs. He acted as general manager of the underground distribution system at Newburgh, New York. He was afterwards in charge to lay the Edison underground systems in other cities.

Wheeler worked for Herzog Teleseme Company as electrician for a short time between 1884 and 1885. Alongside F. Benedict Herzog, Wheeler was granted a patent for an "Electric Signaling Apparatus" in 1896. Then in 1886 he was part of developing and organizing the C and C Electric Motor Company with Charles G. Curtis and Francis B. Crocker. They were pioneer manufacturers of small electric motors. Wheeler became their main technician and plant manager. Wheeler then left the firm as did Crocker in 1888. They organized the electrical engineering firms of Crocker-Wheeler Motor Company of New York state and the Crocker-Wheeler Company of the state of New Jersey. Wheeler was president of both the firms from 1889. During his tenure with Crocker-Wheeler, he was particularly important in development of the electric motors and applying it to machine tool drives. He was for seven years (1888–1895) the electrical expert consultant specialist of the Board of Electrical Control of New York.

In 1900, he purchased the library of Josiah Latimer Clark, which contained the largest collection of rare electrical works then known. He donated the Latimer Clark Library collection and it became the foundation of the library housed in New York's Engineering Societies' Building. The Institute of Electrical and Electronics Engineers (IEEE) recognized him as one those who had given outstanding service to the Institute. In his IEEE presidential address in 1906, he was the progenitor of the Code of Ethics for electrical engineers, which was adopted in 1912 by the Institute's Board of Directors.

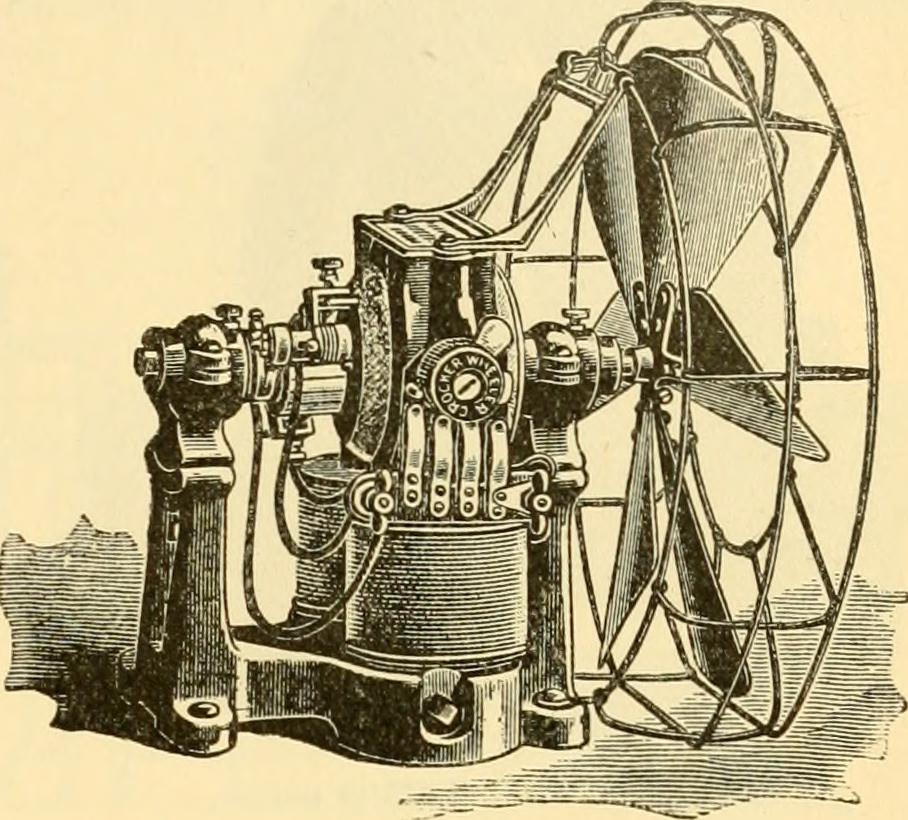
1882 electric fan

== Inventions ==
Wheeler invented many electrical devices. He specialized in power saving electrical tools. In 1882 he invented the electric fan by placing a two-bladed propeller on the shaft of an electric motor. It was known as the "buzz fan." He was awarded the John Scott Medal for this invention in 1904 by the Franklin Institute. Wheeler's patent for his Electric Fire-engine System was filed May 23, 1882. The United States Patent Office officially approved his invention on February 24, 1885.

Wheeler invented the use of the electric motor in connection the Gatling gun which reduced the work of the operator when firing to simply pressing a button. It is one of the earliest applications of electricity to machine guns. He invented paralleling of dynamos and series multiple motor control. In 1883 he patented an electric elevator design.

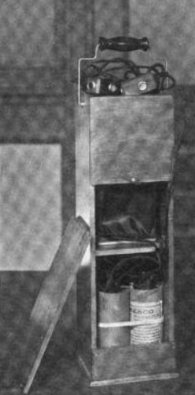
ACA ballot box

=== Electrical balloting apparatus ===
Wheeler devised an electrical voting device in 1907. This came about through the Automobile Club of America membership application process of the time. Formerly the board of governors made use of an old-fashioned method of dropping a small colored ball into a ballot box to determine their approval or disapproval of the applicant. The black and white ball plan of indicating a yes or no vote was good as long as there were not many applicants for membership. The balloting became very time consuming when the list of applicants became large. This was due to the mechanical handling of the little balls and the repository ballot box.

A new technology was invented by Wheeler that used electricity for instantaneous voting and immediate results. He was the club's first vice president and the consulting engineer. His innovation was to have each club member just sit in his chair and press a button for their vote. This would transmit their vote electrically to the central ballot box. Each voter had in his hand a small block of wood in which were two push buttons, one black and the other white. If the member had no objection to the applicant becoming an official member he pressed the white button. Their vote was recorded instantly then at the central location ballot box that received all the member votes electrically. If they thought the club would be better off without the applicant, the voting member pressed the black button for an instant tabulation. These votes, in either case, were in secret and securely tabulated an immediate result.

== Later life ==
The Crocker-Wheeler company of New Jersey was located in the now defunct town of Ampere. Wheeler innovated a way after World War I to have disabled veterans that became visually impaired from war injuries to become productively employed as self-supporting citizens. Wheeler established an auxiliary factory of the Double-Duty Finger Guild on May 11, 1917. It was a separate training center and furnished work for the blind. The building was a few blocks away from the main factory and suitable material from the main factory was brought over to this auxiliary facility for the blind to assemble.

These blind workers were paid a minimum wage during training and afterwards promoted to full-time positions to earn a normal income. One of their duties at first was the taping of wire coils which were on the armatures of electric motors. This was easily learned and advanced work was soon taught of winding wire coils for electric motors and transformers. The trainees were given a minimum wage at the beginning and then promoted to the regular wage earned by sighted employees. Wheeler traveled to Europe in 1918 to explain to the French and British governments this system he used for the blind.

The superintendent of the main factory suggested that some of the more talented blind trainees could work at the main factory. The result of that idea was that these blind people were given the opportunity to work side by side with the regular employees in the main factory. This plan proved satisfactory and resulted in the testing of processes not known to the normal electrical trade. Special drills and punch presses were used in Wheeler's experiments. He allowed his main factory to be used as a workshop and research facilities in which the blind could test these various unconventional manufacturing techniques.

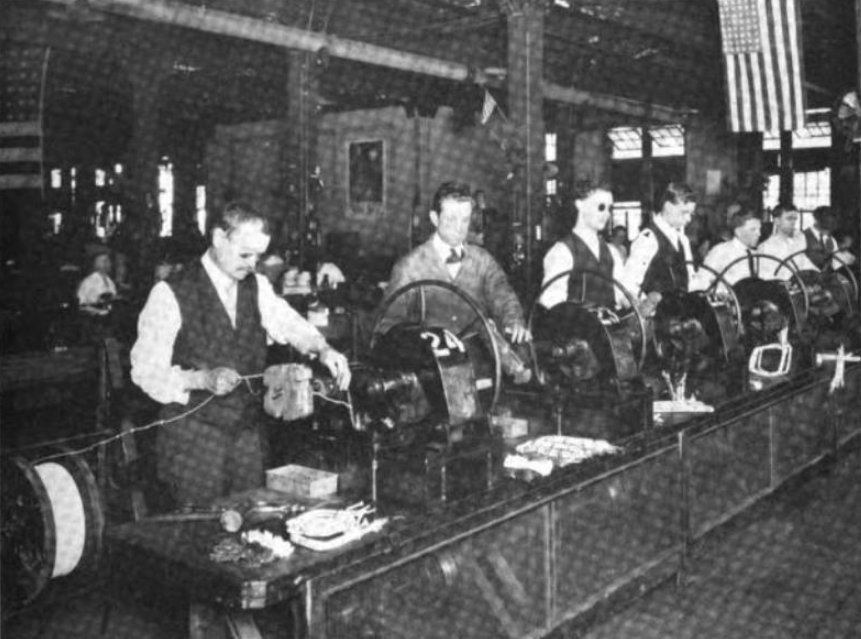
Crocker-Wheeler main plant blind coil winders for electrical motors

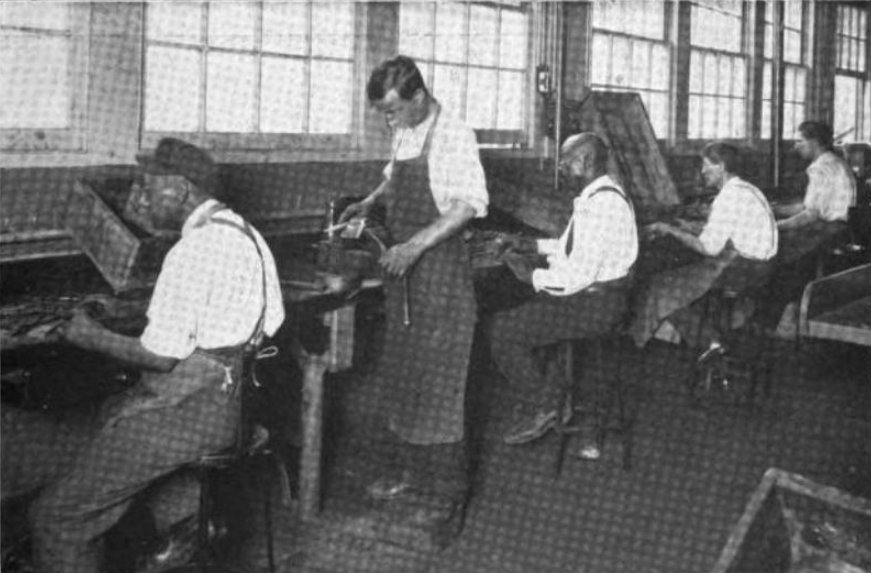
Crocker-Wheeler main plant blind workers making transformers

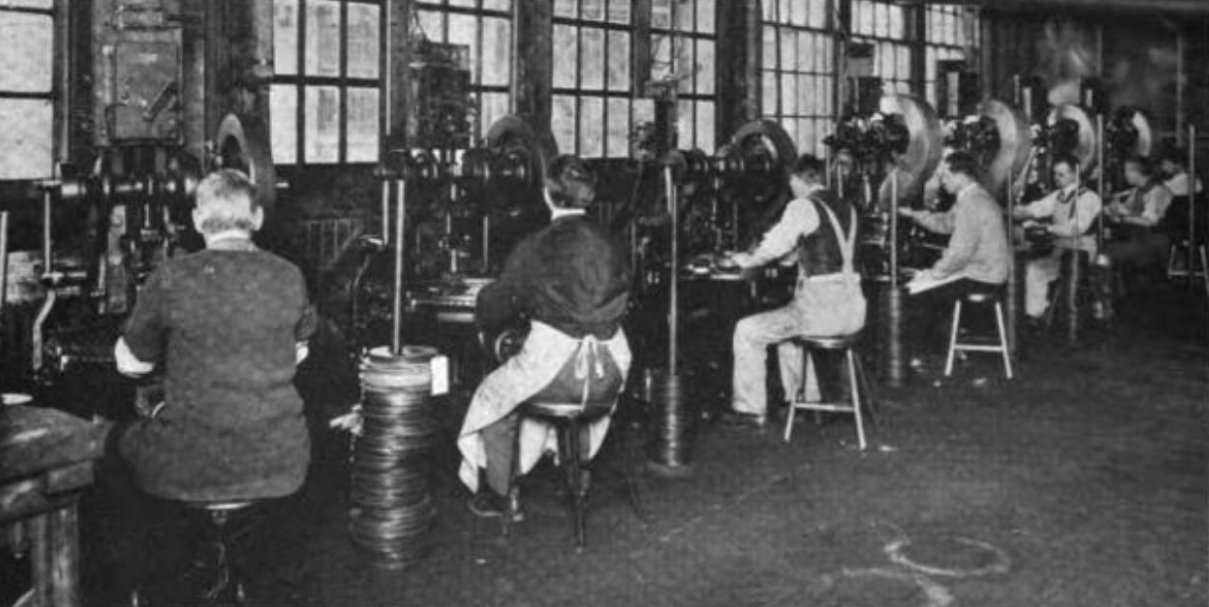
Crocker-Wheeler main plant blind workers on notching machines

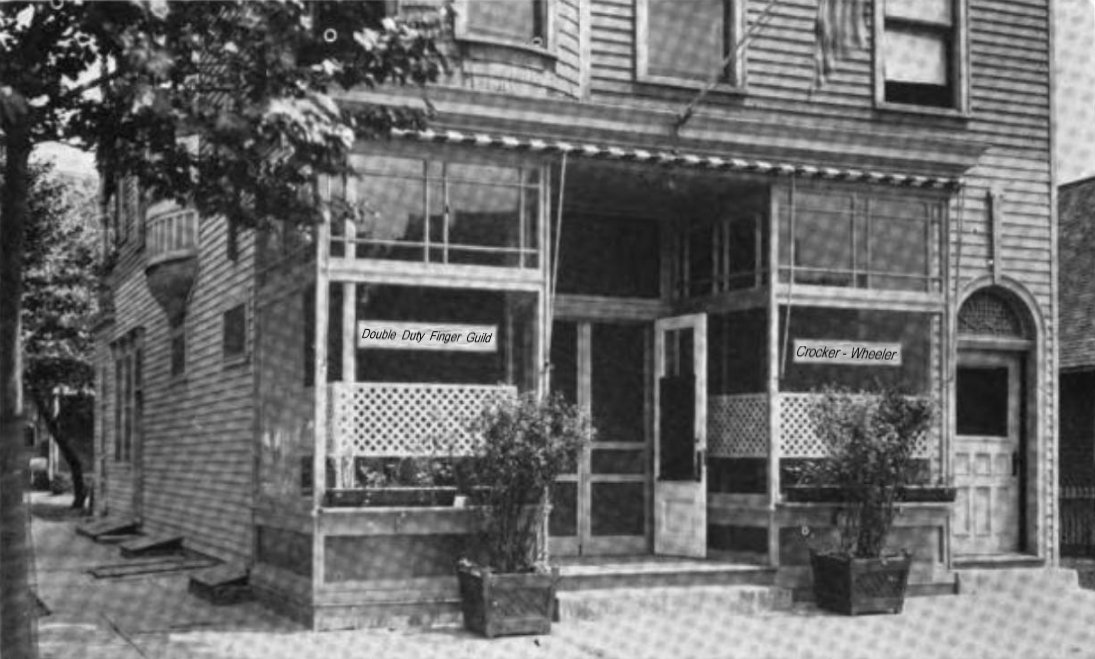
Double-Duty Finger Guild of Crocker-Wheeler Company, department for the blind auxiliary factory and training center.

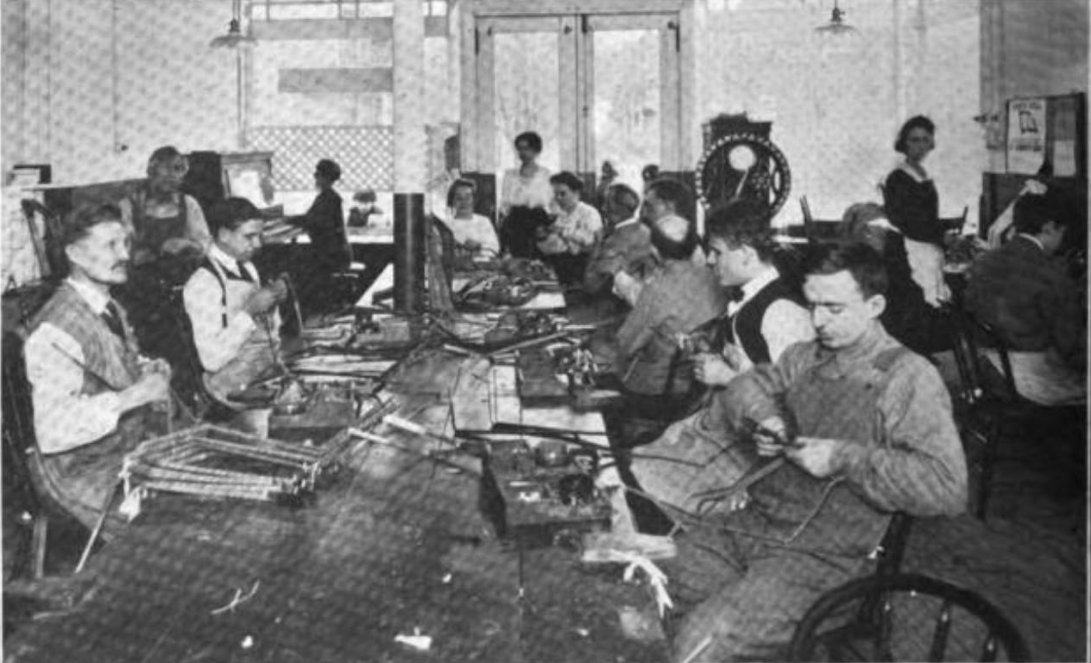
Crocker-Wheeler blind workers training to tape electric motor armature coils at the Double-Duty Finger Guild.

== Personal life ==
Wheeler was married in 1898 to Ella Adams Peterson, daughter of Richard N. Peterson of New York City. She died in 1900 and he married again in 1901 to Amy Sutton, daughter of John Joseph Sutton of Rye, New York. He was a member of the American Society of Civil Engineers; the American Society of Mechanical Engineers; the American Institute of Electrical Engineers (President, 1905–1906; Vice President for three years); the University Club; the Lotus Club; the Lawyers' Club; and the Automobile Club.

Wheeler was one of nine incorporators of the United Engineering Society formed in May 1904 and was one of three representatives of the IEEE. He was also a member of the Efficiency Society with other millionaires. He wrote several technical articles related to electricity in various journals. He wrote articles for Harper's Weekly under the title, "The Cheap John in Electrical Engineering." In 1894 he joint authored a book titled "The Practical Management of Dynamos and Motors" with Professor Francis B. Crocker.

Wheeler was awarded the honorary degree of Doctor of Science by Hobart College (1894); and a Master of Science by Columbia College (1912). His papers are archived primarily with the IEEE. He died of angina pectoris at his home in Manhattan on April 20, 1923. At the time of his death, he chaired the IEEE committee on "code of principles of professional conduct."

== Sources ==
- Bernhard, Frank H. (1921). EMF Electrical Year Book. Electrical Trade Publishing Company. OCLC 42337519.
- Colby, Frank Moore (1916). The New International Encyclopedia. Dodd, Mead and Company. OCLC 19425466.
- Colby, Frank Moore (1924). The New International Encyclopedia. Dodd, Mead and Company. OCLC 320991580.
- Hamersly, L. R. (1914). Who's who in New York City and State. L.R. Hamersly Company. OCLC 1081072058.
- Kane, Joseph Nathan (1997). Famous first facts. H. W. Wilson. ISBN 978-0-8242-0930-8. "4332. The first electric fan was invented by Dr. Schuyler Skaats Wheeler, who in 1882 placed a fan or propeller on the shaft of an electric motor."
- Malone, Dumas (1936). Dictionary of American Biography ... Volume XIX. OCLC 769913141.
- Scannell, John James (1917). Scannell's New Jersey First Citizens State. J.J. Scannell Company. OCLC 312901815.
- White, J. T. (1900). National Cyclopedia of American Biography. OCLC 7685559.
