= Okonite =

American engineering company

The Okonite Company is an American manufacturer of insulated wire and cable.The company is headquartered in Ramsey, New Jersey with six manufacturing plants located around the continental United States.

== History ==
The company was founded in 1878 by John Haven Cheever, as the New York Insulated Wire and Vulcanite Company and took its present name in 1885. Its original premises were in Passaic, New Jersey. Some of its earliest customers included Samuel Morse and Thomas Edison. Charles A. Cheever (1852-1900) was its President for some time.

Its products have been used in Pearl Street Station (the first generating station built in the United States, opening in 1882), the lighting of the Statue of Liberty, and more recently in One World Trade Center.

"Okonite" was originally a material made from the residue produced when distilling the mineral wax ozokerite, mixed with rubber, and used as an electrical insulator.

In 1965 the company was acquired by James Ling.

In June, 1976, Okonite became owned by its employees through an Employees' Stock Ownership Trust.

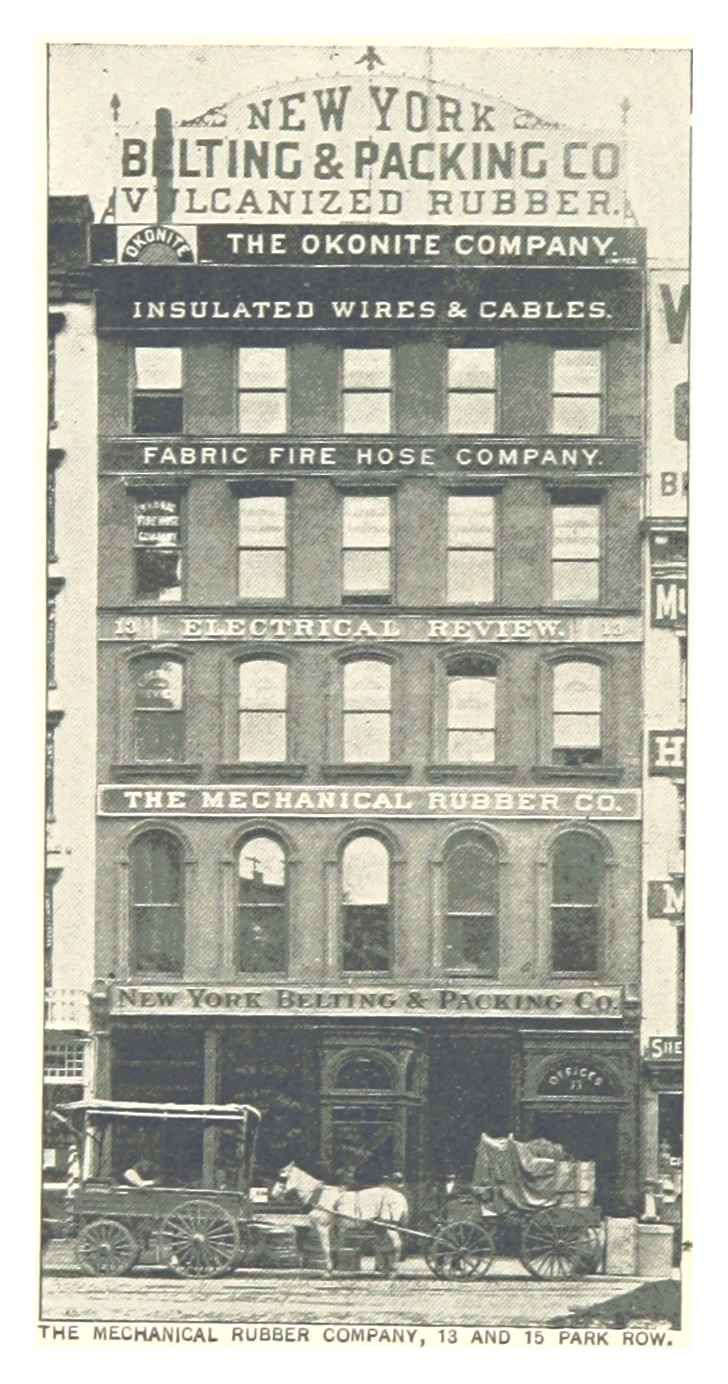
Okonite's premises at 15 Park Row, New York, in the 1900s

== Products ==
The company manufactures insulated wire and cable ranging from 300V to 345,000V with applications including Instrumentation, Power and Control, Medium Voltage, and High Voltage circuits. These cables are manufactured with a variety of insulating and jacketing materials including Okoguard® EPR, laminated polypropylene paper (LPP), and other thermosetting and thermoplastic compounds.
