= Engine order telegraph =

Communications device used on a ship

Engine order telegraph

An engine order telegraph or E.O.T., also referred to as a Chadburn, is a communications device used on a ship (or submarine) for the pilot on the bridge to order engineers in the engine room to power the vessel at a certain desired speed.

== History and construction ==
Invented by Charles Grafton Page in the 1850s, the EOT in its original form is a drum-shaped intrument with a knob at the center attached to a lever that can be moved to different positions on the dial; an indication pointer also attached to the center is connected to another telegraph, and shows where the other station's telegraph is set. The connection can be an electrical connection, or a mechanical connection of chains and wires. When the handle is moved to a different position, an audible alarm sounds at both ends.

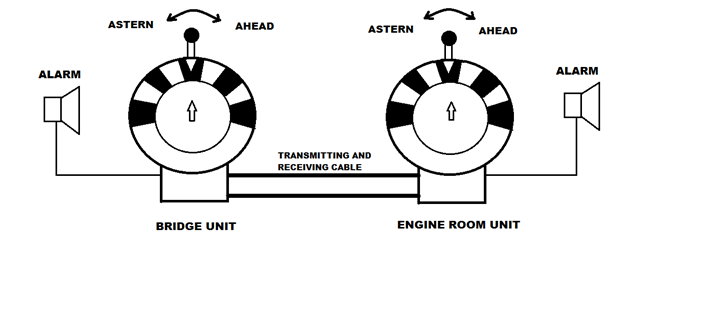
Block diagram of the EOT signal system

Chadburn's Limited of Liverpool was responsible for 75 percent of the world's EOT production. Because of that, EOTs are often referred to under the generic trademark "Chadburn".

At least two telegraph units are installed, respectively in the engine control room and on the bridge; an additional unit may be located on an emergency maneuvering station. On vessels with more than one engine or bridge, the system must connect all engine rooms and bridges.

On a modern vessel, a remote-controlled telegraph device is directly connected to the engine controls, allowing the pilot to control the engine without the involvement of engine room personnel.

== Order transmission ==
Traditional EOTs require a pilot wanting to change speed to "ring" the telegraph on the bridge, moving the handle to a different position on the dial. This sends a signal to the EOT placed in the engine room whose pointer acquires a position according to the signal given from the bridge. An audible alarm sounds at both ends. Accordingly, the watch-keeping engineer acknowledges the order by moving the handle of the engine room EOT to the required position and takes necessary action. This sends an electrical signal to the bridge EOT unit, causing its pointer to acquire the respective position. The alarm stops ringing to acknowledge that the order has been carried out. Such an order is called a "bell"; for example, the order for a ship's maximum speed, flank speed, is called a "flank bell".

For urgent orders requiring rapid acceleration, the handle is moved three times so that the engine room bell is rung three times. This is called a "cavitate bell" because the rapid acceleration of the ship's propeller will cause the water around it to cavitate, causing a lot of noise and wear on the propellers. Such noise is undesirable during conflicts because it can give away a vessel's position.

=== Dial positions ===
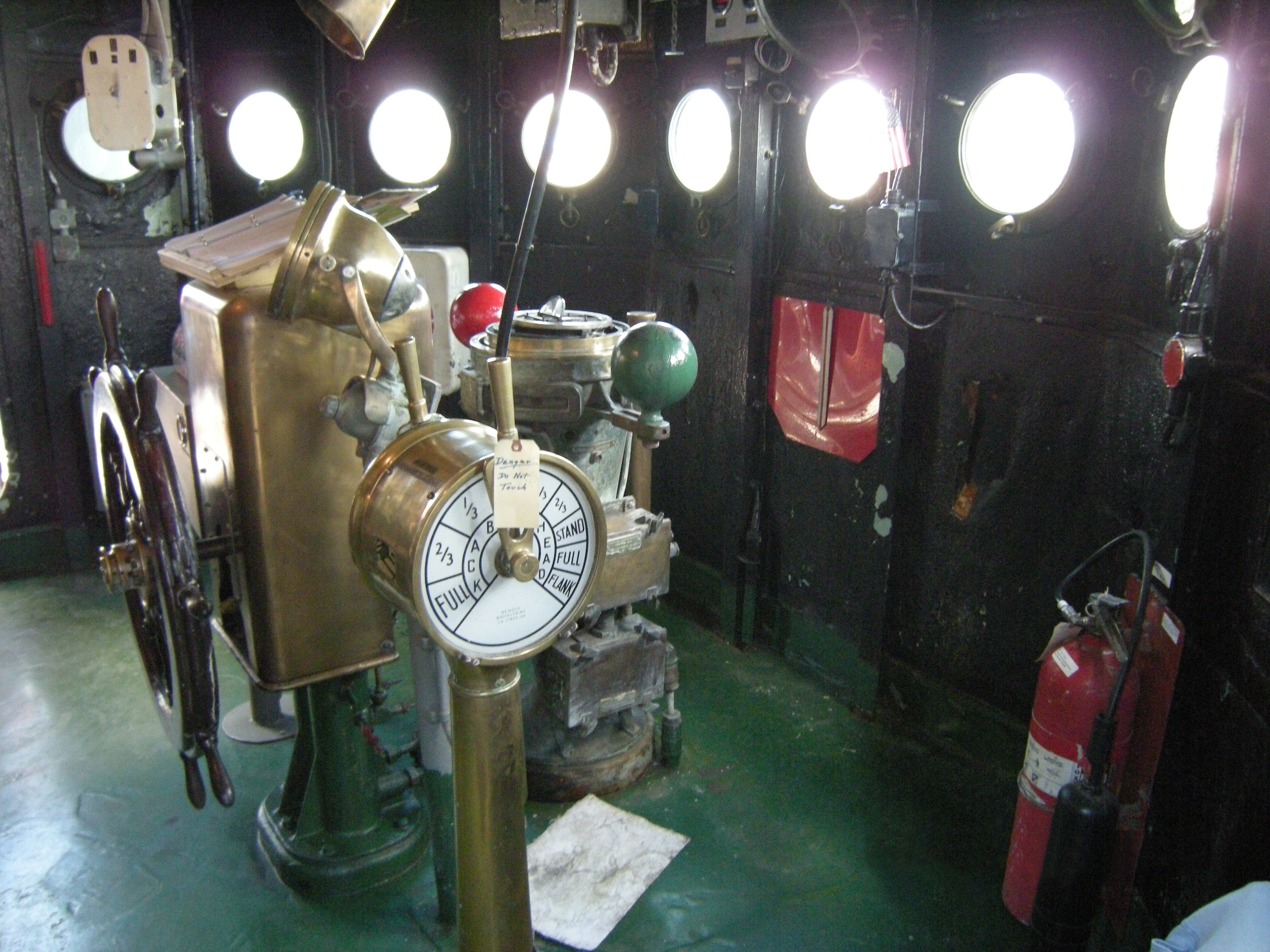
USS LST-325's bridge engine order telegraph

The dial positions can vary depending on the ship. For example, the engine order telegraph of Titanic include:

Direction	Speed
Astern	Full
Astern	Half
Astern	Slow
Astern	Dead slow
Standby
Stop
Standby
Ahead	Dead slow
Ahead	Slow
Ahead	Half
Ahead	Full

Ships may also omit the two "Standby" positions.

== See also ==
- Flank speed
- Teleseme
