= Inolex =

Global manufacturer of specialty ingredients for the personal care and cosmetics

- Company type: Private (since 1981)
- Industry: Sustainable Ingredients
- Predecessor: American Can Company, Wilson Pharmaceutical & Chemical (Ling-Temco-Vought), Wilson & Co., Martin-Wilson Company, D.B. Martin Company
- Founded: 1876; 150 years ago
- Founder: D.B. Martin
- Headquarters: Philadelphia, Pennsylvania, United States
- Area served: Worldwide
- Key people: David C. A. Plimpton (CEO, President, Chairman)
- Website: www.inolex.com

Inolex is an American company that designs ingredients for the personal care and cosmetics industries. Headquartered in Philadelphia, United States, the company has been operating since 1876. Inolex supplies ingredients for consumer products including sunscreen, hair conditioner, skin care products, wet wipes, and cosmetics.

The company has operations in the United States, Brazil, Mexico, France, Belgium, Germany, United Kingdom, South Korea, India, and China. Inolex designs and produces ingredients that can be used to replace palm oil, silicone, and preservatives.

== History ==
Inolex, which stands for innovation ("IN"), technology ("OL"), excellence ("EX"), was founded in 1876 as the D.B. Martin Company and has been a privately held, independent company since 1981.

=== 1876–1967 ===
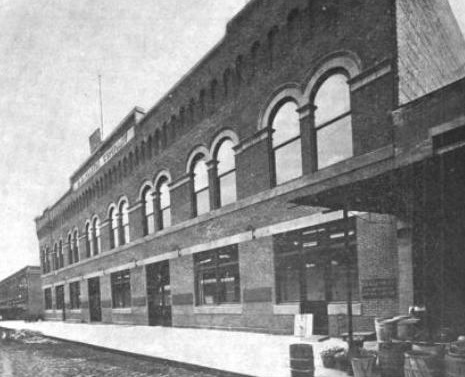
The D.B. Martin Co.'s Flagship Facility in Philadelphia, PA (1908)

In 1876, D.B. Martin founded the D.B. Martin Company' in Delaware, US, and in 1904, he incorporated the company in Philadelphia. The company processed animal-derived fats, oils, fatty acids, soaps, and animal fibers. It rapidly grew in the United States and Canada, becoming the largest meat packing and processing operation east of Chicago. Martin contracted architect C.B. Comstock to design a modern, single-site facility in Philadelphia at a cost of $1,000,000. The building opened in 1908 and incorporated an abattoir, corporate headquarters, office space, rooftop stock pen, cold storage, and oil-processing operations, along with advanced environmental controls to protect city residents.

The Wilson-Martin Company logo (1961)

Following it acquisition by Wilson & Company, Inc. in 1920, the newly formed Wilson-Martin Company operated as a subsidiary of Wilson & Co., focusing on animal fiber and fatty-acid derivative production. In the 1930s, the company developed a prototype continuous production apparatus for the distillation of fatty acids that was later adapted to a full-scale commercial version, an important innovation in the industry. Previously, industrial fatty-acid distillation had been performed using batch processing methods. The new, continuous process method delivered improvements in yields and quality, and allowed producers to easily switch from one raw material to another without production downtime, cleaning of the apparatus, or cross-contamination of the materials produced. By 1961, the Wilson-Martin Company produced a line of products branded "Wilmar" and "Wilimids", emphasizing gas chromatography as an assurance of superior quality. Products in these lines included emulsifiers, esters, plasticizers, lubricants, distilled fatty acids, and germicidal fatty nitrogen derivatives.

=== 1967–1981 ===
In June 1967, the U.S. conglomerate Ling-Temco-Vought acquired Wilson & Company, including its subsidiary Wilson-Martin Company, during a period when Ling-Temco-Vought stated it was strategically focused on acquiring quality-focused companies that were pioneers in their industries. Following the acquisition, parent company Ling-Temco-Vought restructured the operations to form publicly held companies that traded on the American Stock Exchange; Wilson & Company, Wilson Sporting Goods, and Wilson Pharmaceutical & Chemical.

The Wilson-Martin Company’s chemical and processing operations were incorporated into the newly formed Wilson Pharmaceutical & Chemical, which produced 140 pharmaceutical products. In 1967, Wilson Pharmaceutical & Chemical acquired Goldschmidt Chemical. In 1969, the Ling-Temco-Vought conglomerate divested several operations, one of which was Wilson Pharmaceutical & Chemical, which was sold to American Can Company for $16,000,000.

During the 1970s, Wilson Pharmaceutical & Chemical operated as a subsidiary of American Can and shifted emphasis towards pharmaceuticals, laboratory diagnostics, and personal care. The company sold its animal products processing facilities and established a new division called Wilson Diagnostics, which developed the "Auxotab" system (later named "Inolex enteric"), an easy-to-use rapid laboratory test kit for the detection of enteric pathogens including E. coli and Salmonella. The product was marketed for use in clinical settings, for environmental monitoring and in the food industry. As part of the reshaping, in 1974, the company rebranded itself as "INOLEX Corporation", a name that was derived from the words INnovation, TechnOLogy, and EXcellence.

The publicly traded INOLEX Corporation was merged back into its parent company American Can in 1979, and in 1981, American Can Company sold the Inolex Chemical Division to private investors.

=== 1981–present ===
Since 1981, Inolex has operated as a privately held, independent company focused on ingredient innovation and production. Early on, the company specialized in ester technology and operated in the polyester/urethane market, cosmetic ingredient market, and specialty lubricant industry. In the 1980s, Inolex developed new ingredient technologies, for example, clear shower gels and urethane sealants. Inolex's first-to-market innovations include proprietary ingredient blends such as natural cationic hair-conditioning agents; natural, broad-spectrum preservation ingredients; and bio-based, plant-derived, silicone replacements.

During this time, Inolex began to focus on sustainability and the environment, sustainable products, alternative preservatives, silicone replacements, palm-free ingredients, and nature-derived ingredients for the cosmetic industry in response to shifting consumer demands. In 2007 Inolex sold the Lexorez and Lexad polyester polyls business from Inolex Chemical Co. to COIM USA. In 2017, Inolex became solely focused on the personal care industry with the sale of the Lexolube industrial lubricant franchise to Zschimmer & Schwarz. In 2018, the company announced plans for a new facility in Charlotte, North Carolina, to expand its global manufacturing and warehousing holdings. In partnership with Michael Gericke (Pentagram), in 2022 Inolex launched a new logo and updated corporate identity.

== Sustainability and the environment ==
Inolex uses green chemistry principles as a method to responsibly manage environmental impact from the design, manufacturing and application of its products. The company produces natural, sustainable ingredients for industry use, and operates demonstration centers in Brazil and China, where formulation and manufacturing professionals learn how to incorporate sustainable technologies and ingredients into cosmetics and personal care formulas.

Inolex has been a member of the Roundtable on Sustainable Palm Oil (RSPO) since 2012, and RSPO mass-balance supply chain certified since 2017. Inolex changed its palm oil-based products to 100% RSPO-certified in 2018 and committed to a 2020 zero-deforestation target. As of June 2016, several Inolex products were on the list of botano-chemicals approved for use in NSF/ANSI Standard 305 Certified Products: Personal Care Products Containing Organic Ingredients. Inolex ingredients have been used in products that comply with the "Premium Body Care Standards" implemented by Whole Foods Market.
