= Charles A. Cheever =

American inventor

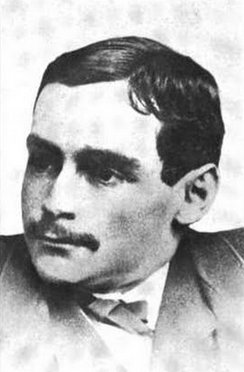
- Charles A. Cheever
- Born: September 7, 1852; Boston, Massachusetts
- Died: May 2, 1900 (aged 47); New York City
- Occupations: Businessman and inventor
- Known for: Identified with Alexander; Graham Bell + Thomas Edison: improved their inventions

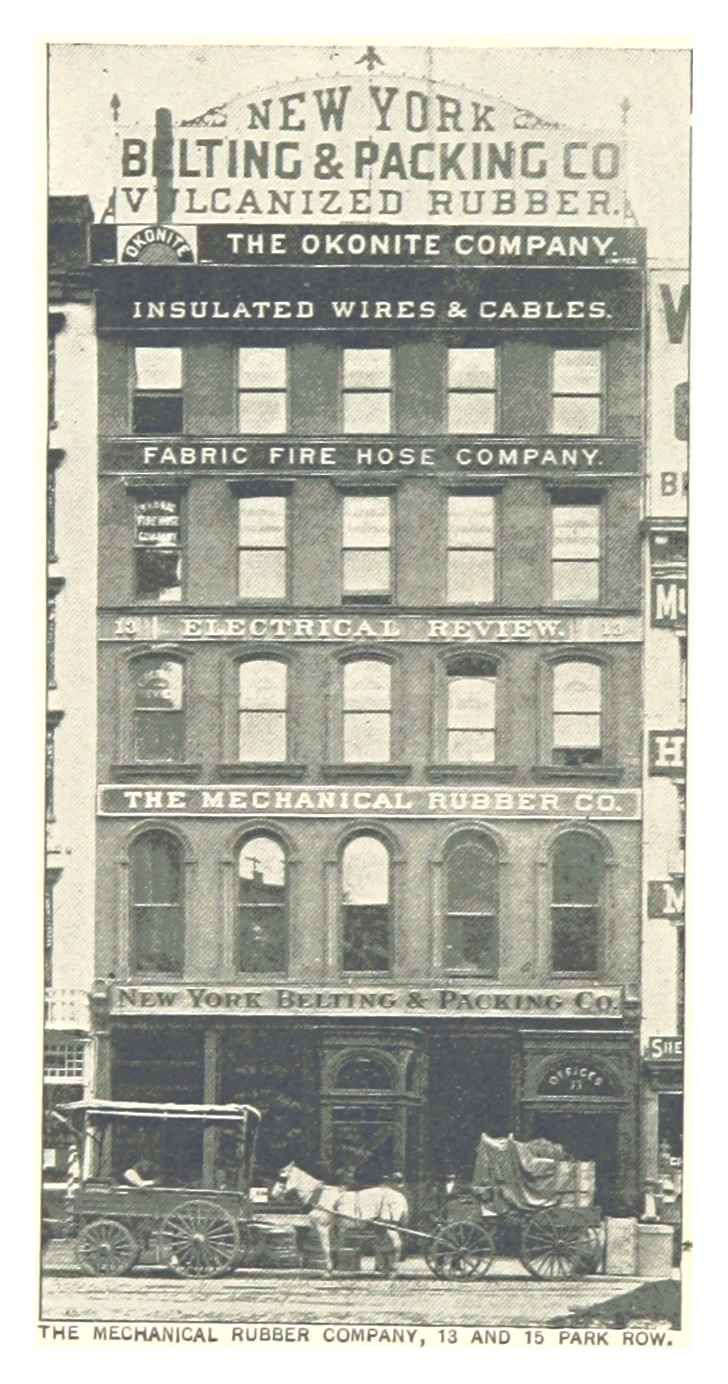
The Okonite Company on Park Row

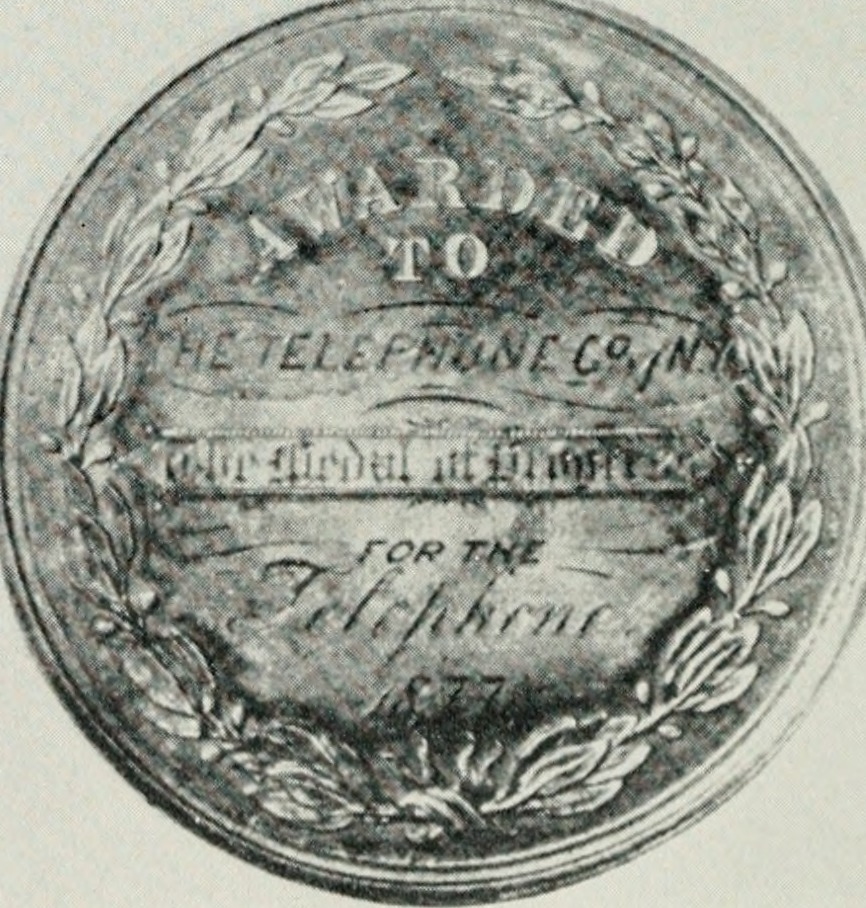
Medal of Progress awarded to The Telephone Company of New York at the American Institute Fair in New York City in 1877. This was the first such medal ever awarded to a telephone company.

Charles Augustus Cheever (September 7, 1852 – May 2, 1900) was an American industrialist and inventor. He was affiliated with Alexander Graham Bell and Thomas Edison improving their inventions. He patented 100 of these improvements, most related to the telephone. Cheever formed the Telephone Company of New York and constructed the first telephone line in New York City. He was disabled early in his life and was an invalid.

== Early life ==
Cheever was born in Boston, Massachusetts, on September 7, 1852. His parents moved to New York when he was around five years old. His father was John Haven Cheever, president of New York Belting and Packing company, and his mother was Anna Elizabeth (Nee Dow) Cheever. He was paralyzed from his waist down at an early age because of a physical development problem. Cheever was about 4 feet (1.2 m) in height and weighed only 70 pounds (32 kg) as an adult. He had to be carried around by a male assistant all the time as he was not able to walk.

== Mid life ==
Cheever became a successful businessman and entrepreneur. He was a fruitful inventor of many items run by electricity and was able to turn them into successful business enterprises. He patented electric rock drills, electrical improvements to elevators, telephone appliances and electric fire engines. Of his 100 patents most were telephone improvements. Cheever was also intrigued with Edison's phonograph. He helped form the North American Phonograph Company and organized firms throughout the United States to promote Edison's advanced commercial version of the phonograph.

Cheever became acquainted with Bell when his invention of the telephone was in its infancy and considered nothing but a novelty item. He was intrigued by it. Cheever went about figuring out how Bell's invention could be beneficial. He constructed and owned the first telephone line in New York City. It was wired from where he lived at 89 Fifth avenue to where E. N. Dickerson lived on Thirty-fourth street. That wired connection showed potential of greater uses for the telephone. Cheever then experimented with a telephone line from his office in the Tribune Building with one to the American Institute Fair to demonstrate commercial usage. He showed the quality of the sound traveling on telephone lines to be good by demonstrating the playing of the band at the Fair reproduced at his office.

Cheever organized and formed the Telephone Company of New York with Hilborne Lewis Roosevelt as his business partner using a capital of about $20,000 (equivalent to $605,000 in 2025) to start the enterprise on August 31, 1877. It was the forerunner of American Telephone & Telegraph company, that later Cheever gained control of. They started with one customer at first, J. Lloyd Haigh, the wire manufacturer for the cables for the Brooklyn Bridge. Cheever's telephone company strung only separate lines and had no central switchboard office. They had trouble at first getting customers to subscribe to their telephone service and lost over $70,000 (equivalent to $2,335,000 in 2025) in their first year of operation mainly due to maintenance they couldn't cover with their few paying customers they had. The Cheever firm went out of business within a year and it was followed in 1878 with the Bell Company of New York that had 900 paying customers by August 1879.

== Later life and death ==
Cheever formulated a practical way of communicating telegraph messages from moving trains through induction telegraphy. He conducted successful experiments on trains of the New York, New Haven, and Hartford Railroad. The concept did not prove to be commercially profitable and was not pursued further. Cheever co-founded the Okonite company, a wire and cable manufacturer that used rubber insulation, since he already owned part of his father's rubber company and combined the technologies to come up with insulated wire. He was also associated with various real estate developments like Wave Crest and Cedarhurst at Far Rockaway, New York. Cheever retired from business in 1897 and died on May 2, 1900, in Far Rockaway after suffering heart failure brought on by an attack of the grip. He never married and was commodore of the New York Yacht Club. At the time of his death his parents were still living, as was two brothers and two sisters.

== Sources ==
- Hazelton, Henry Isham (1925). The Boroughs of Brooklyn and Queens, Counties of Nassau and Suffolk, Long Island, New York, 1609-1924; Volume 3. Lewis historical publishing Company. ISBN 9780788449833.
- Johnson, Alfred Sidney (1901). Cyclopedic Review. Garretson, Cox & Company. OCLC 896597769.
- Leonard, John William (1910). City of New York, 1609–1909. Journal of commerce and commercial bulletin. OCLC 776902514.
