= Michael Gericke =

American graphic designer

Michael Gericke (born 1956) is an American graphic designer and partner at the New York office of the design firm Pentagram.

== Education and career ==
Gericke was born in 1956 in Madison, Wisconsin. He studied visual communications and graphic design at the University of Wisconsin and earned a Bachelor of Fine Arts degree in 1978. In 2010, he received the University's Distinguished Alumni Award.

Gericke worked initially for Communication Arts of Boulder, Colorado, where he produced many projects combining graphics with three-dimensional design. Since 1985, Gericke has been a principal of the New York office of Pentagram.

He is a member of the Alliance Graphique Internationale (AGI), admitted in 1998. His work is in the permanent collections of the Library of Congress, the AIGA Design Archives at the Denver Art Museum, the Poster Museum, Wilanów in Warsaw, the Museum für Kunst und Gewerbe Hamburg, and the Museum of Design, Zürich. In 2022, Gericke was named to the Society for Experimental Graphic Design's (SEGD) inaugural Class of Fellows, in recognition of Gericke's leadership in the field of experimental and environmental graphic design.

== Work ==
Gericke has created projects for international clients, institutions, public agencies and cultural organizations. His graphic images are noted for their simplicity and broad appeal. Architecture and design critic Paul Goldberger writes: "What ties Gericke's images together, beyond their inherent formal elegance, is a sense that he comes to every problem fresh and searches to find the essential qualities of the object he is representing."

=== Logos and branding ===
Gericke designed the iconographic logo for One Laptop per Child, the non-profit organization with the goal of empowering the world’s poorest children by providing them with low-cost, low-power, connected laptop computers. The identity is a hieroglyph, designed to be universally understood by any culture, independent of language.

In 1998, Gericke created, for the Port Authority of New York and New Jersey, the name, logo and visual identity for the two AirTrain systems in the New York metropolitan area. Both the name and symbol describe the nature of the transport system: being the train to the plane.

In 1994, Gericke created the symbol for the 1994 FIFA World Cup. The symbol's dual meaning represents a football flying in front of stadium stands, and an abstraction of the American flag, portraying both the sport and host country.

Gericke designed the visual identity for the Big Ten collegiate conference. The design's lettering includes an embedded numeral "10" in the word "Big," which allows viewers to see "Big" and "10" in a single word. He created the championship trophy and branding for the new College Football Playoff system that was established in 2014. The trophy is awarded for the highest level of team achievement in the Division 1 NCAA sport.

In 2013, with Pentagram partner Emily Oberman, Gericke designed the logo for 21st Century Fox.

In 2015, with Pentagram partner Eddie Opara, Gericke designed the visual identity for the Cooper Hewitt, Smithsonian Design Museum.

In 2017, Gericke designed a logo and brand identity for NYC residential real estate listing platform Igluu.com. In 2022, Gericke led the brand redevelopment strategy for Inolex, a company focused on the design of sustainable ingredients.

=== Public memorials ===
In 2002, in collaboration with the Port Authority, Gericke designed the initial "viewing wall" for the World Trade Center site in Lower Manhattan. The wall was made of a screen-like grid of galvanized steel that allowed visitors to see directly into the site. A series of panels displayed the history of the World Trade Center, including the events of 9/11. Architecture and design critic Paul Goldberger wrote about the project: "Against a simple gridded transparent wall that allows unobstructed views for all visitors to Ground Zero, Gericke combined black-and-white photographs and historical text depicting the rich history of Lower Manhattan and the rise and fall of the twin towers...It is simply a place where anyone can observe the work under way at Ground Zero and remember."

In 2004, in collaboration with architects Skidmore, Owings & Merrill, Gericke designed "the first tangible element" of New York's Freedom Tower, its 200-ton inscribed cornerstone. When the architectural designs for the tower were later changed, the cornerstone was moved to Hauppage, New York and installed as a permanent memorial to victims of 9/11.

In 2005, Gericke and his firm Pentagram designed, with Port Authority architect Jacqueline Hanley, a memorial reliquary honoring the victims of the 1993 World Trade Center bombing.

=== Environmental graphics ===
In 2004, Gericke and his firm Pentagram designed, with Entro Communications, the signage and wayfinding system for Terminal 1 at Toronto Pearson International Airport. Developed in tandem with the terminal architecture by Moshe Safdie and David Childs of Skidmore, Owings & Merrill (SOM), the system is organized around information pylons and overhead directional signage designed for maximum visibility across the terminal's interior spaces.

In 2006, Gericke and his firm Pentagram designed, with Entro Communications, the environmental graphics for University of Phoenix Stadium, home of the Arizona Cardinals.
