= Electric fire engine =

Fire engine with an electric motor

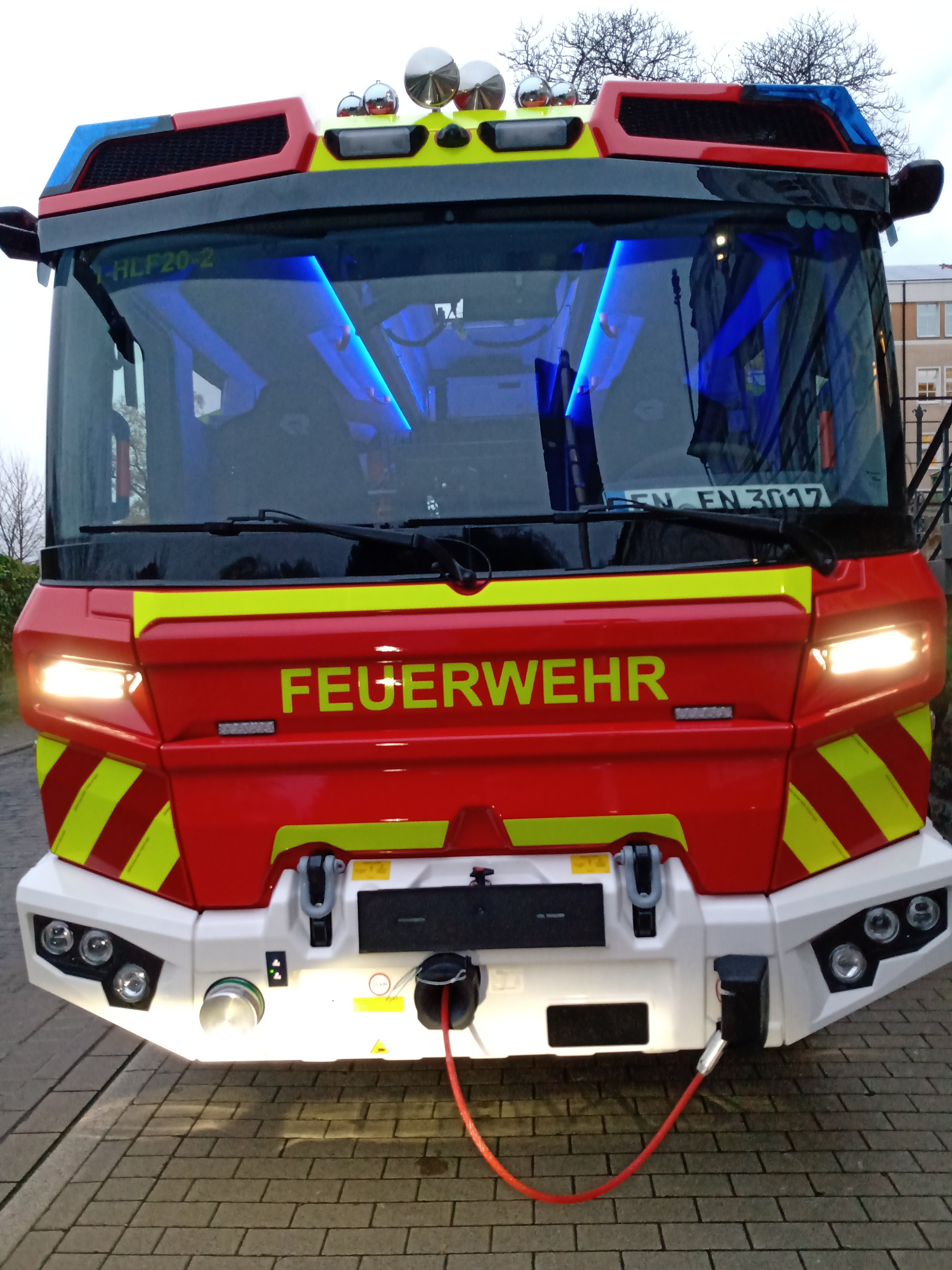
A Rosenbauer RT electric fire engine used by the Ennepetal Feuerwehr

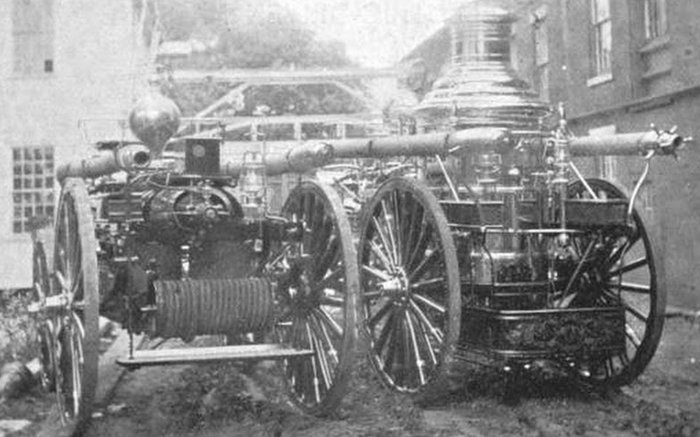
Electric fire engine (left) next to a typical 19th-century steam pumper fire engine of equal capacity, c. 1895

An electric fire engine is a fire engine that is powered by an electric motor—essentially, an electric vehicle designed and used for firefighting. Electric fire engines were first proposed in the 19th century to replace the steam pumpers used for firefighting. The electric motor was claimed to be simpler, cleaner, and faster in operation, would save money, and require less maintenance than the steam fire engine. Though production of most electric-powered fire engines ended in the early 20th century when they were superseded by diesel-powered fire engines, they have seen a revival in the 21st century, with fire engine manufacturers such as Rosenbauer and Pierce Manufacturing designing their own electric fire engines.

== History ==
=== Schuyler Wheeler invention ===
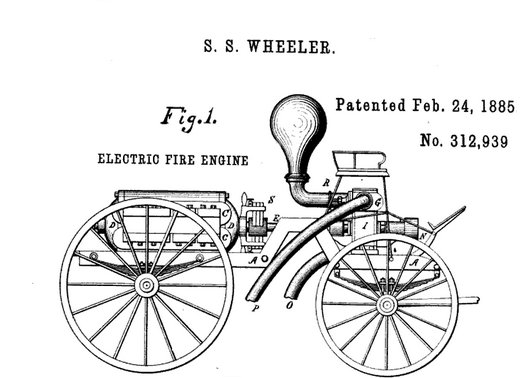
Wheeler's patented electric fire engine, the first such design

American inventor Schuyler Wheeler patented an electric fire engine system in the United States in 1885. He filed his invention in 1882 and the patent was issued in 1885. The system included electrical infrastructure, with electric motor driven water pumps, on a horse-drawn vehicle. The fire-engine vehicle was designed with the same general equipment as a regular steam fire engine of the time, but used electrically operated equipment instead of steam power. It was designed with an electrical regulator, and a switch for the main electric motor that drove the water pump, that pushed water through the fire-hoses used to put out the fire.

The electric motor was equipped with several hundred feet of cable carried on a reel. The cable attached to a specially designed electrical outlet box that was nearest to the fire. The box would be located next to the water plugs throughout the city districts in the manner previously mentioned. When the engine was tested, it gave very good results, and is now in use at the factory of the Crocker-Wheeler Electric Company, in Ampere, New Jersey. The company claimed that an electric fire engine of the same capacity as a steam fire engine would be more efficient.

=== William H. H. Whiting ===
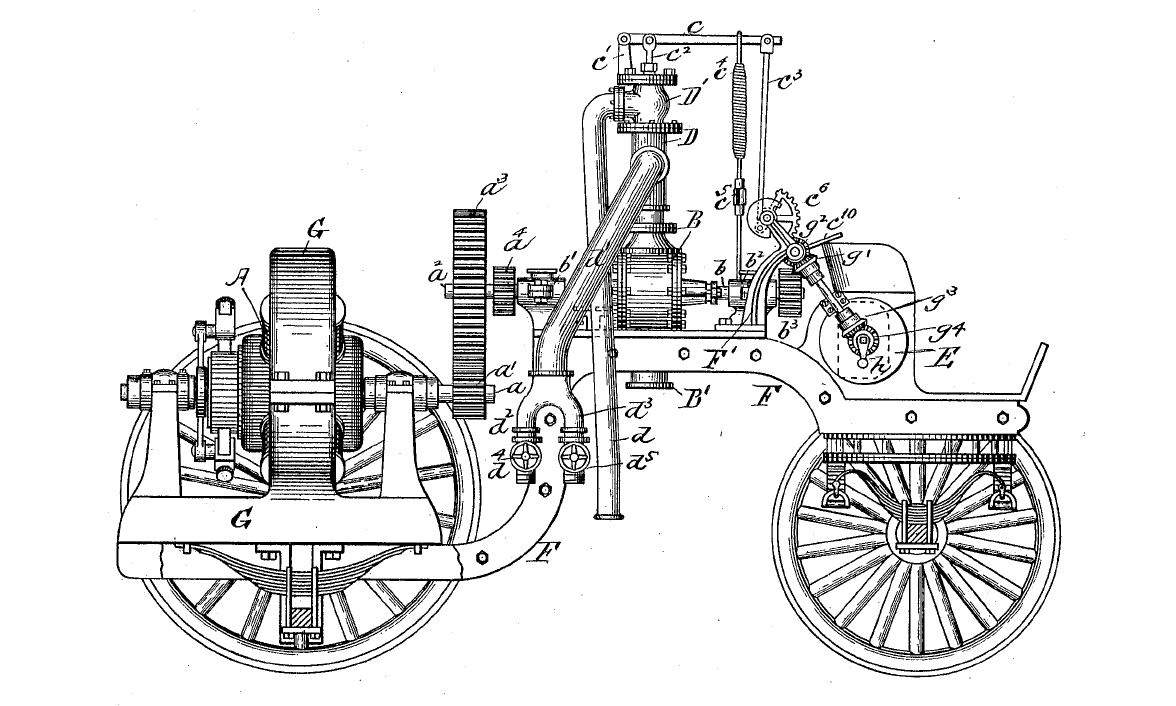
Whiting's electric fire engine

William H. H. Whiting was an insurance adjustor and auditor with a special interest in fire prevention. Mr. Whiting made improvements to the design of an electric fire engine which was granted a patent (#632,665) in 1899. the principal points are the special combination of motor, a rotary force-pump, controller and safety-valve, and automatic stop-motion. Whiting was a prolific inventor throughout his life, as was his father and brother.

=== Joseph Sachs invention ===
Joseph Sachs had also invented an electric fire engine vehicle consisting of a wagon on which a spring-supported platform held an electric motor which operated two rotary water pumps. The motor was supplied with a reel of electric cable and it could be regulated from either side of the vehicle.

=== American experiments ===
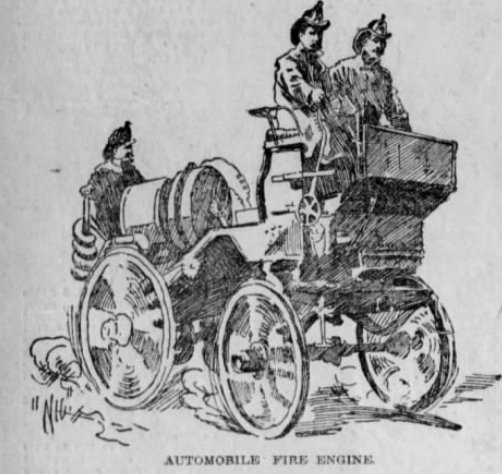
A sketch of an electric fire engine, circa 1900

There were various experimental illustrations showing what an electrical fire engine could do better than a steam fire engine if the complete system was put into operation. One set up demonstration was at the Crystal palace electrical exhibition of 1892.

The Electric Fire Engine Company of Seneca Falls, New York, was formed on 25 June 1890, to manufacture the fire engine apparatus and associated equipment. The Electric Fire Engine Company of America was formed December 1899 in Des Moines, Iowa. It was to manufacture self-propelled automobile electric fire engines and general equipment for fire departments.

The Springfield, Massachusetts fire department purchased an electric fire truck with an automatic extending ladder that was operated by electricity in 1910. The aerial ladder was 85 feet (26 m) long and electrically raised, instead of being hand cranked by firemen to use it. Other city fire departments in the state were watching its tests as they considered whether or not to purchase it for their firemen.

The Cincinnati Fire Department implemented use of battery-powered electrical fire engines, which were claimed to be much more effective than horse drawn engines.

=== European experiments ===
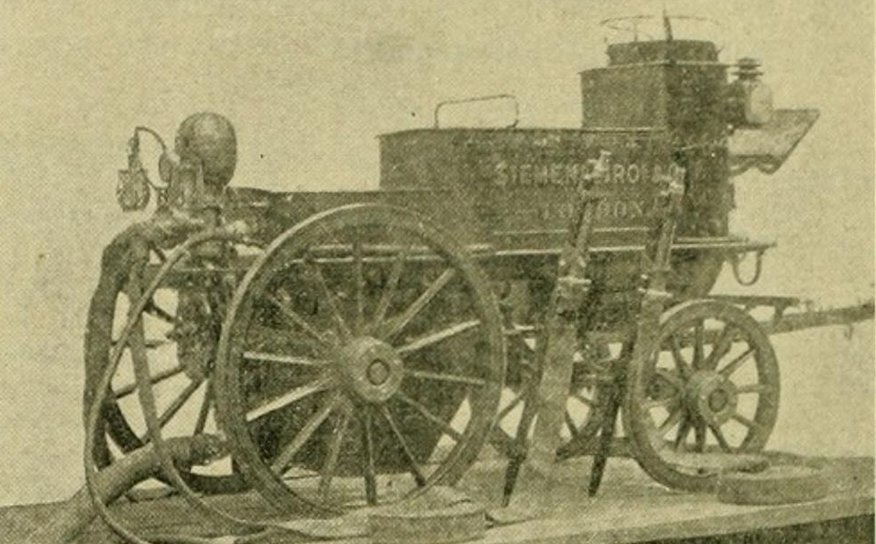
Siemens electric fire engine, circa 1891

Experimental electric fire-engines were made for testing in France, Germany and England starting in the latter part of the nineteenth century. Siemens Brothers Company of London built and experimented with an electric fire engine in 1891. It was shown at the Royal Naval Exhibition in England in 1892. The Paris Fire Brigade experimented with a self-propelled electric fire engine in 1899. The French electric fire engine, known to them as the automobile pump, was first exhibited at the 1900 World's Fair in Paris and became very popular during its first six months of successful operation. It was demonstrated that this electric fire-engine allowed firemen to begin to extinguish a fire four minutes earlier than a steam fire engine. The fire-engine was self-propelled by on board batteries, and carried a water tank with hundreds of gallons of water that could be used immediately at the site of the fire. The hoses were then connected to the city fire hydrants for more water if needed for a large fire. In 1901, the Paris Fire Brigade put an electric fire engine into successful operation that also had a hook-and-ladder wagon. It had an electric motor-driven water pump to which hoses were attached for the firemen to use.

=== 21st century revival ===
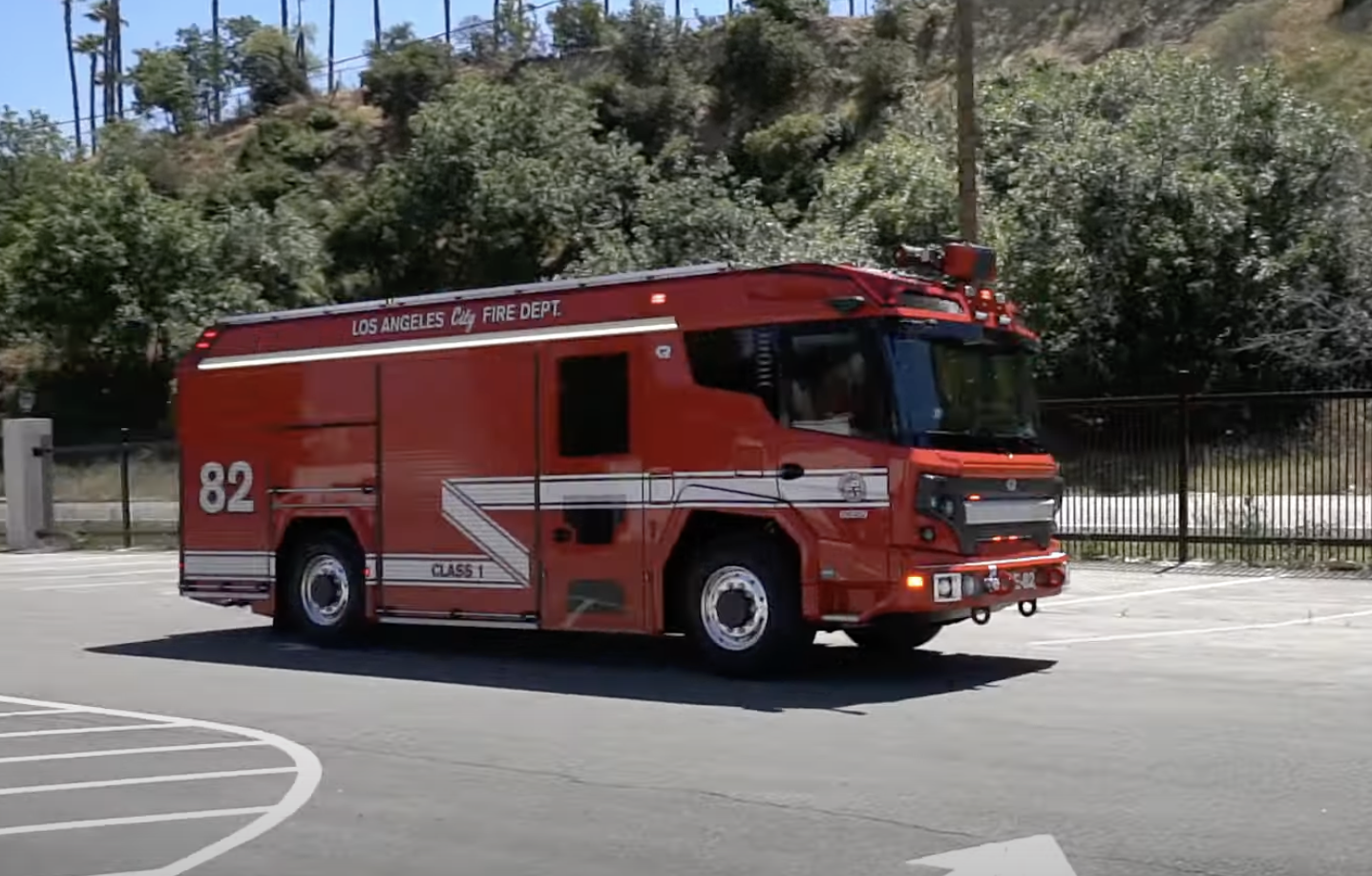
A Rosenbauer RTX electric fire engine used by the Los Angeles Fire Department

In the 21st century, some manufacturers have designed storage battery-operated, self-propelled electric fire engines, which they claim are a better, cleaner and greener alternative to gasoline and diesel fuel fire trucks. These are said to be better suited for particular types of environments such as resorts and manufacturing facilities. Harnessing battery power is an old idea, going back to the 19th century. It joins an increasingly long list of production battery-operated vehicles.

In 2002, the French car manufacturer Peugeot designed an electric fire engine with a futuristic appearance. It is a fuel cell battery vehicle that is designed halfway between a twenty-first century automobile and an ordinary gasoline fire engine. The front part carries two firemen, and the rear is a large water-tank with a ladder on top. The vehicle makes its own hydrogen and oxygen needed to supply the fuel cell battery that operates the vehicle, water pump, smoke extractors, and electronic equipment.

In 2017, Rosenbauer introduced a concept vehicle named the Concept Fire Truck (CFT). The CFT was designed with all-wheel drive and all-wheel steering, with each of its four wheels powered by an electric motor, with a diesel-powered auxiliary engine as a backup range extender. In 2019, Pierce Manufacturing initiated a collaboration with the City of Madison, WI, to develop an electric fire truck with a parallel-electric drive train and an internal combustion engine, which would fit the city's fleet vehicle sustainability and emissions initiatives.

In 2020, Rosenbauer announced that the production model, renamed the RT, would begin trials with Amsterdam, Dubai, and the Australian Capital Territory. In 2021, the Pierce Volterra electric fire engine was put into service for the Madison Fire Department in Wisconsin, where Engine 8 became the first in-service zero-emissions electric fire truck in North America.

In 2022, the Los Angeles Fire Department deployed a Rosenbauer RTX as Engine 82 in Hollywood, making it the first in-service range-extended fire engine in North America. Also in 2022, the London Fire Brigade deployed an electrified Volvo FL fire engine, the first of its kind in the United Kingdom. A specially equipped Rosenbauer was put into service for hazardous materials calls for Cambridge, Massachusetts in August, 2024.

== Background of design considerations ==
When conceived in the nineteenth century, the electric fire engine was proposed to replace the steam fire engine in use at the time. It was to be constructed in such a way that it would use a supply of electrical power that came from a central station whereby electricity could be distributed to various covered stations and city supply points. This would require underground or overhead wiring similar to that used for electric light, trolleys, and other power users of the time. It was thought that the wiring could supply electricity to various outlet posts at strategic places throughout a city or fire protected district. These outlets would supply the necessary current to the fire-engine's electric motor. The vehicle itself was to be hauled by horses and would consist of a carriage wagon with an electric motor-powered water pump permanently mounted atop. There would be cables from the motor that would connect to the outlet post to obtain the required supply of electric current.

=== Advantages ===
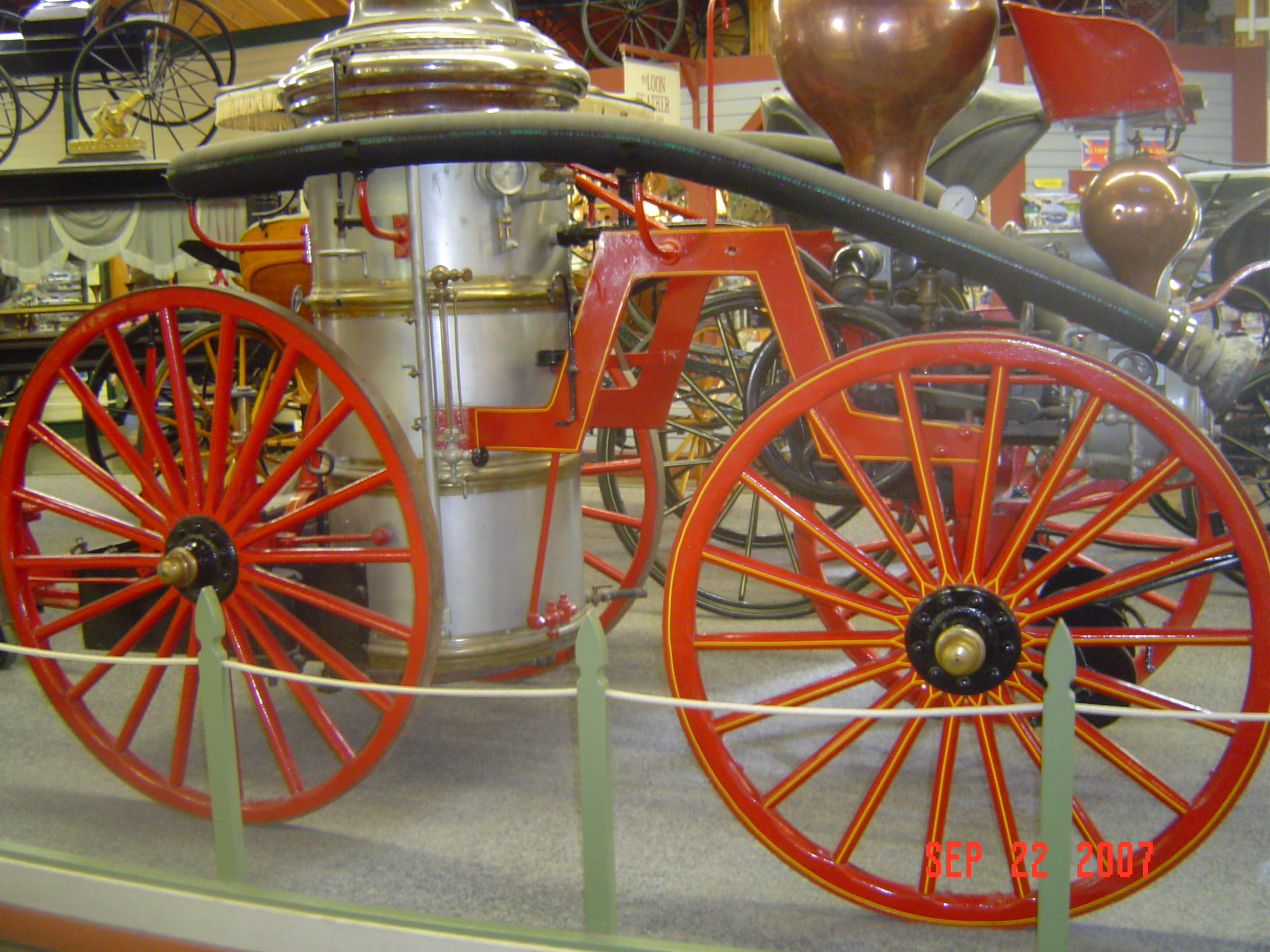
Nineteenth-century steam fire engine in Mackinac Island museum

The electric fire engine would have several advantages over the steam fire engine. One was that an electric fire engine could be brought to full power immediately, whereas a steam fire engine took time. It was necessary to keep the fire going all the time to boil the water on a steam pump vehicle, with workmen furnishing coal for it. This was required so that as little time as possible was lost getting the water to boil to produce steam to run the water pump to extinguish the fire. In the case of an electric motor running a fire engine water pump, its operation was basically instantaneous since the motor was running at full power capacity when the switch was turned on. The advantage of using electricity was its lower cost overall, (i.e. no coal or extensive maintenance) and simplicity of operation.

Other advantages of using an electric fire engine were that it would not produce loud noises, smoke, dust, cinders and ashes, as steam fire engines did. Also, the cost of an electric fire engine would be about one-third that of a steam boiler fire engine. A typical electric fire engine weighed sixty percent less than a steam boiler of the same capacity.

=== Disadvantages ===
There were experimental test operations set up to see if the idea was feasible; however, the technology of electrical systems and power grid infrastructures were inadequate in the nineteenth-century to operate such a system. Another disadvantage was the possibility of power loss caused by wire breaks or electrical equipment failures – which often happened during storms. The nineteenth-century idea to replace the existing steam fire engines with electric ones was ahead of its time and never moved forward.

The portable electric fire engine would be efficient and practical only if a supply of electricity was available in a city for this purpose. An argument against the high cost of such an electrical installation was that the cost would be lower in a city or district where there was already an infrastructure set up to power electric lighting and electrical railways. The same current supply could be used for the electric fire engine system.

== See also ==
- Charles A. Cheever

== Sources ==
- Appleton (1895). The Popular Science Monthly. D. Appleton.
- Government Printing Office, United States (1886). Patents Relating to Electricity.
- Sachs, Joseph (1895). Cassier's Magazine. L. Cassier Company, Limited. "The electrically-operated fire engine would possess a number of advantages over the steam fire engine. Not only would it be much lighter and smaller for the same capacity, but it would be simpler and more efficient and not necessitate any waiting, as at present, to raise steam. In fact, as soon as the engine arrived at the fire, the motor and pump could be started at once by simply making the connection with the plug or switch boxes. Aside from this, it would be free from all smoke, dust, cinders and ashes, which are such objectionable accompaniments of steam fire engines."
