= Teleseme =

Pre-telephone hotel signaling device

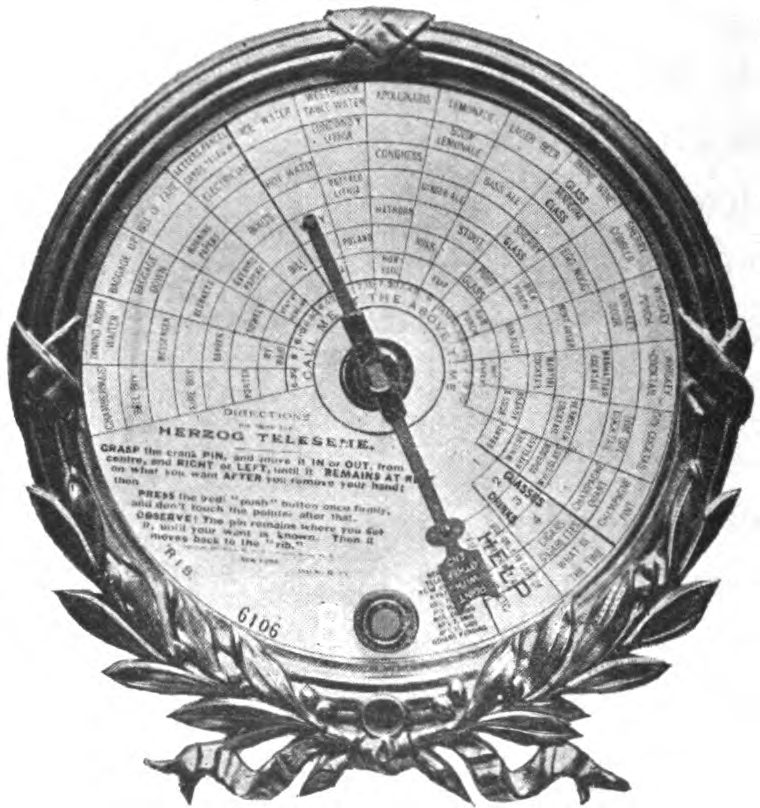
A teleseme from Electric Telegraphy (1896) The instructions read: GRASP the crank PIN, and move it IN or OUT, from centre, and RIGHT or LEFT, until it REMAINS AT REST on what you want AFTER you remove your hand then PRESS the red "push" button once firmly, and don't touch the pointer after that. OBSERVE: The pin remains where you set it, until your want is known. Then it moves back to the "rib."

The teleseme, (Note: Various spellings have been used for the device, including Tellesame.) also known as the Herzog Teleseme, was an electric signaling device used in luxury hotels in the late 19th and early 20th centuries. Guests desiring room service could use the dial mechanism of their room's teleseme to indicate a good or service from over 100 options. An attendant in a hotel office would then receive the request at a corresponding teleseme and have the order filled.

Telesemes were invented by F. Benedict Herzog in the 1880s, alongside Schuyler Wheeler. They were an "emblem of luxury" in hotels from the 1890s through to the 1910s but were eventually replaced with private branch exchange (PBX) telephone systems.

== History ==
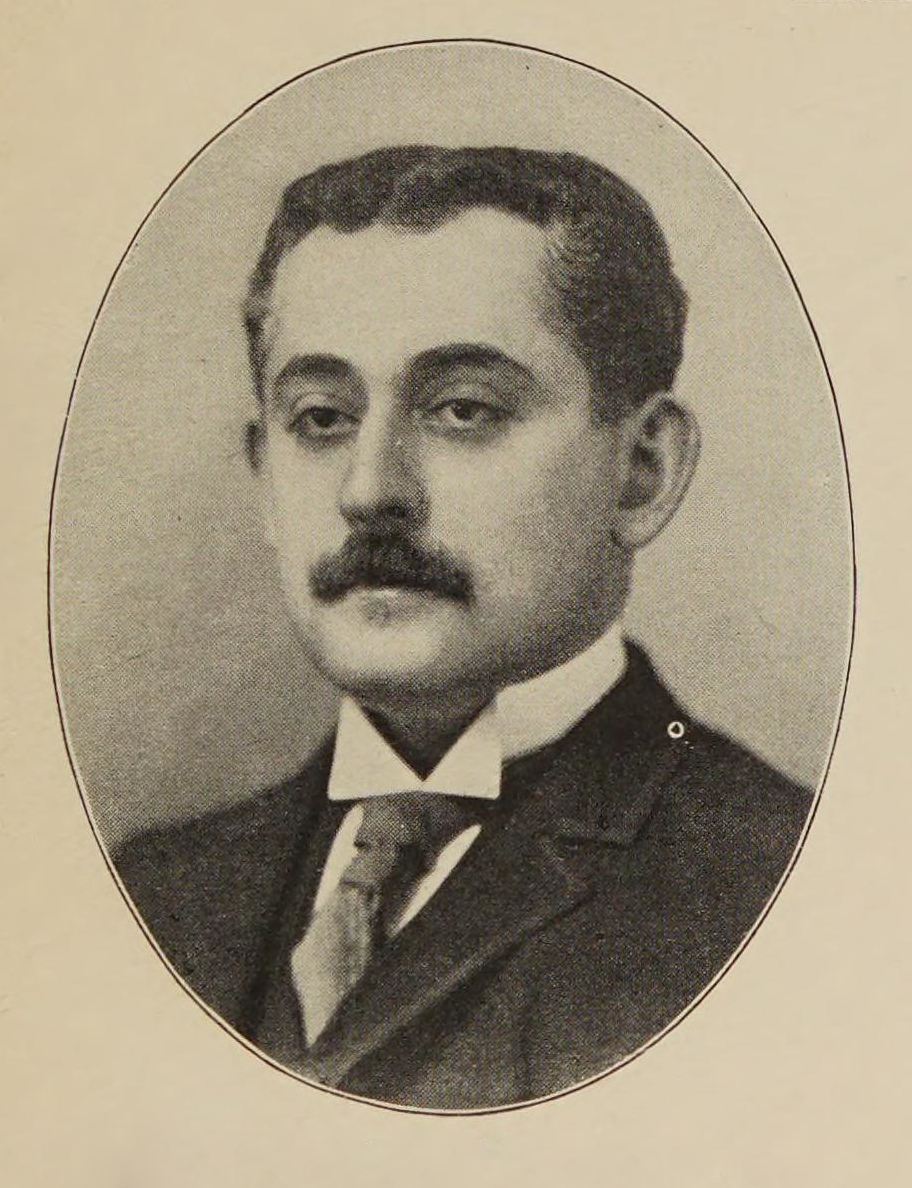
Felix Benedict Herzog, inventor of the teleseme

American electrical engineer and inventor F. Benedict Herzog designed electrical devices such as automatic switchboards, elevator signals, and telephone accessories. He founded the Herzog Teleseme Company and worked with electrical engineer Schuyler Wheeler, whom the company employed in 1884 and 1885. Herzog and Wheeler were granted patents for an "Electric Signaling Apparatus".

The teleseme, marketed as the Herzog Teleseme, was a signaling device for hotels. It came after simple electric signaling systems, but before hotels had telephone systems connecting rooms. The system was faster than buzzing the front desk and waiting for an employee to come to the room to take a request. Telesemes were being manufactured by the Herzog Teleseme Company located in New York at 55 Broadway by 1890. The Herzog Teleseme was patented in 1895.

The Herzog Teleseme Company marketed telesemes to luxury hotels as well as offices and stores. The company advertised the device as having many styles, sizes, and capacities. According to the company, the device "saves bell boys, increases bar receipts, gives better service" and could be "attached to any system of wiring".

== Operation ==
Telesemes were installed in individual hotel rooms, set in the wall and connected by wire to a hotel office.

The teleseme had a dial roughly the size of a dinner plate, with written options arranged in concentric circles. Teleseme models offered a varying number of options (137 choices in one model, 140 in another). To operate the teleseme, the hotel guest would move the hand of the pointer to the desired service. Once the guest had set the dial, they would push a button which closed the circuit and alerted a hotel employee through an electrolytic annunciator.

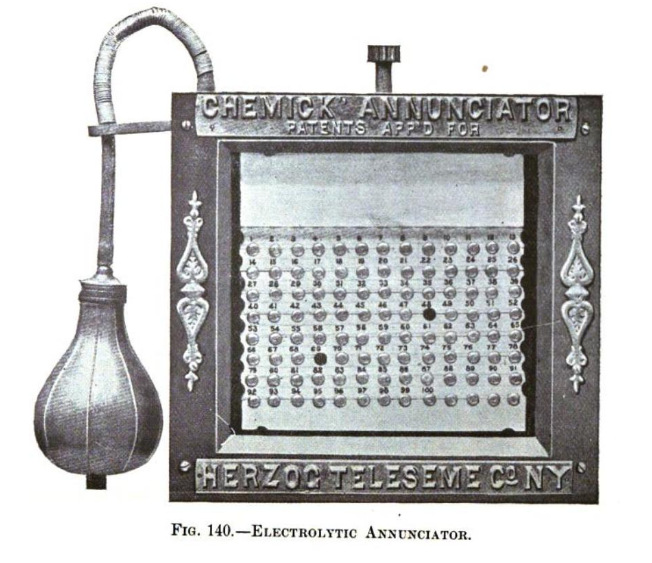
An annunciator would alert a hotel attendant that a room had made a request through their teleseme.

An attendant in the hotel office would monitor an electrolytic annunciator, a small glass display around 8 in × 12 in (200 mm × 300 mm) with up to 400 numbered compartments, each holding a platinum disc in a liquid suspension beneath the number. A red spot would appear on the platinum disc, and the discoloration would indicate which room had requested service. The attendant would note the room number and squeeze a bulb that would force air into the liquid and clear the red spot. The attendant would then use their own teleseme to mimic the setting from the one in the hotel room and determine the order.

The teleseme enabled guests to call for various services, by specifying the need for a certain hotel employee, such as a waiter, chambermaid, manservant, hairdresser, or valet. Beverages and food could also be ordered and room service items ranged from cognac to lemon squash and seltzer to oysters, buttered rolls, chicken salad, and soft-boiled eggs.

== Reception ==
By the early 1890s, the teleseme became an "emblem of luxury" for hotels in an era before telephones became common in guest rooms. Telesemes were installed in Paris's Élysée Palace hotel in the 1890s. The Jefferson Hotel in Richmond, Virginia, opened in 1895 and had telesemes installed. Telesemes were also included in Statler Hotels.

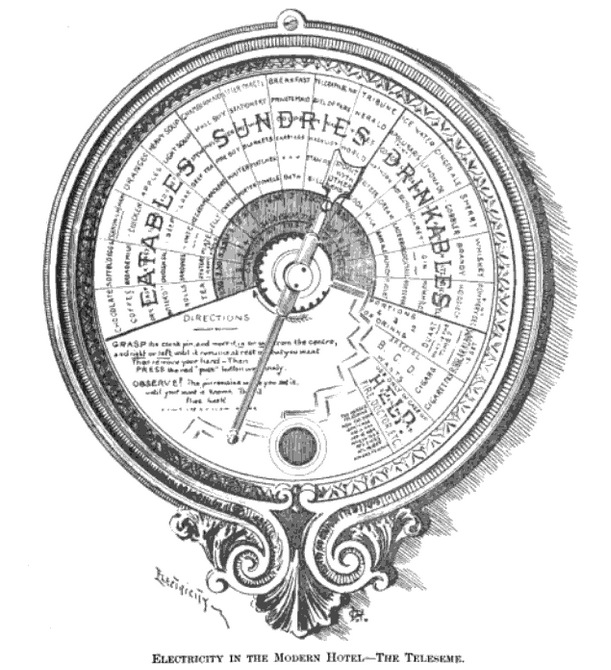
Depiction of a teleseme from an 1891 article in Electricity: A Popular Electrical and Financial Journal

An 1891 review in Electricity: A Popular Electrical and Financial Journal described the teleseme as coming into vogue in large establishments. According to the review, the list of services on each teleseme dial was "a formidable one and can hardly fail to evoke surprise that there are so many things involved in the modern idea of hotel luxury." The review describes "a full complement of breakfast beverages, and every imaginable solid concomitant". Also listed among the teleseme's options were police, a carriage, "my wash", a penny stamp, and the principal daily newspapers. According to the reviewer, "The completeness of the teleseme arrangement is shown by a special set of figures in the centre of the dial, under which is the injunction 'Call me at the above time, but do not disturb me till then'."

It is rather suggestive that fully one-third of the dial is devoted to "drinkables", and of this space one-fifth is occupied with various brands of champagne. Such a list is a dangerous thing to have at one's elbow on a hot summer's day, for it comprises everything from appolinaris [sic] to a gin fizz, and includes the insidious sherry cobbler, the seductive cocktail and the patrician "Bass".

Moses King, in his 1893 travel guidebook King's Handbook of New York City, described the teleseme at Holland House in New York City as the "most perfect of all signalling systems". The novelist Edward Eggleston wrote a piece for The Century the same year that incorporated a teleseme.

An 1894 article in The Electrician reported surprise that a New York hotel had replaced its new telephone service connecting rooms with a teleseme system. An inquiry to the establishment revealed that hotel operators were unable to keep up with the calls and that the phones had become "a huge nuisance on account of the facility they afforded for easy communication with the office, and particularly through the use made of them by the ladies for transmitting complaints".

The teleseme had its drawbacks as it could not handle complicated requests and errors could result in ordering the wrong service. One hotel guest, Mrs. Hamlin, recalls her mother attempting to order water mid-morning and being mistakenly sent a bottle of champagne. Hotels eventually moved away from the teleseme in favor of private branch exchanges (PBX) with telephones in every room. A broker of PBX systems in 1914 wrote that hotels with telesemes were reluctant to switch systems.

The teleseme technology was later adapted by Herzog for a police-signaling device in New York.

== See also ==
- Engine order telegraph
