= James Ling =

American businessman

- Born: James Joseph Ling; December 31, 1922; Hugo, Oklahoma, U.S.
- Died: December 17, 2004 (aged 81); Dallas, Texas, U.S.
- Occupation: Businessman

James Joseph "Jimmy" Ling (December 31, 1922 – December 17, 2004) was an American businessman and former head of Ling-Temco-Vought corporation. While at its helm, Ling used LTV funds to purchase a large number of corporations, and was one of the more famous of the 1960s conglomerate managers.

== Biography ==
Ling was the son of a Catholic convert who later entered a Carmelite monastery. Ling's mother died when he was young, and he lived for a time with an aunt in Shreveport, Louisiana. He failed to graduate from a Jesuit high school but became a master electrician after training at a US Navy school in Mississippi.

In 1947 he founded his own Dallas electrical contracting business, Ling Electric Company, where he lived in the rear of the shop. After incorporating and taking his company public in 1955, Ling found innovative ways to market his stock, including door-to-door soliciting and selling from a booth at the State Fair of Texas.

In 1956 Ling bought L.M. Electronics, followed by Altec Electronics in 1959 and Temco Aircraft in 1960. In 1961, he bought Chance Vought Aircraft, merging his interests into Ling-Temco-Vought. His empire fell apart after he acquired the money-losing Jones & Laughlin Steel Company in 1970. He had to sell subsidiaries to try to stanch the ensuing financial hemorrhage.

After antitrust issues arose, bankers forced Ling's resignation later in 1970. Ling formed several companies after his time at LTV, but none were as successful. His first comeback try, Omega-Alpha, went bankrupt in 1975.

Ling died of esophageal cancer at his Dallas, Texas home in 2004.
