= F. Benedict Herzog =

American photographer

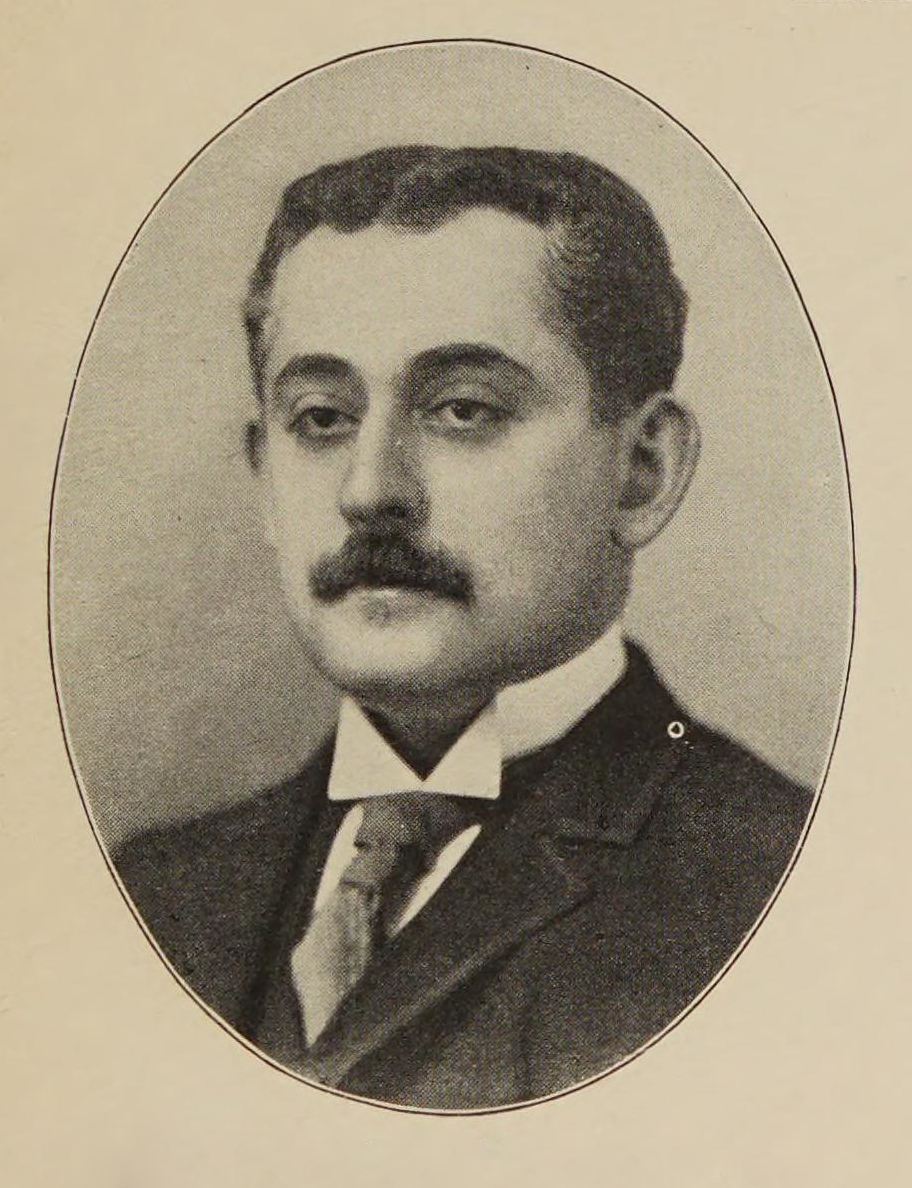
F. Benedict Herzog

Felix Benedict Herzog (December 27, 1859 - April 21, 1912) was an American electrical engineer, patent attorney, artist and photographer who discovered "America's First Supermodel" Audrey Munson. His Tale of Isolde established precedent in the US as the first pictorial photograph admitted by an art society on full equality with paintings.

== Biography ==
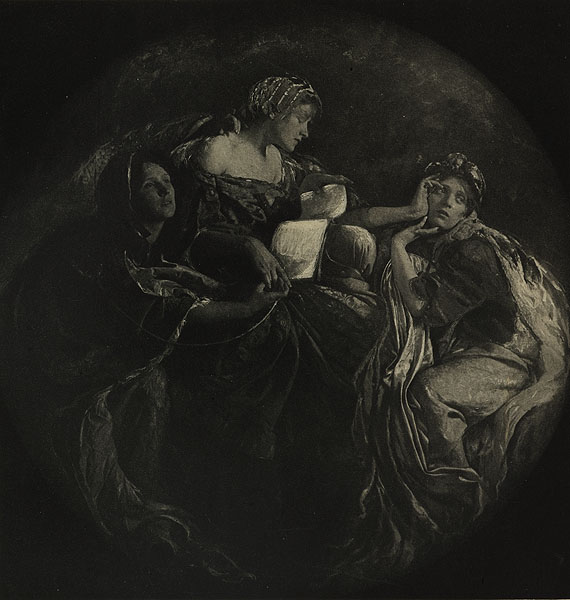
Tale of Isolde (1905)

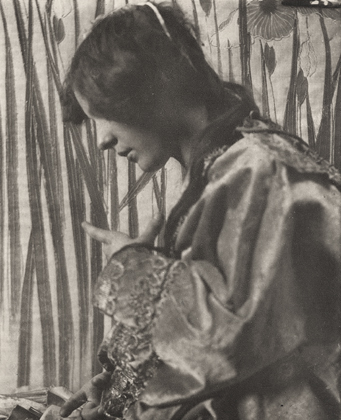
Angela

Herzog was born in New York City, December 27, 1859, the son of Philip and Henrietta (Benedict) Herzog. He was a graduate of Columbia University (A.B., 1881, LL.B., 1882. A.M., Ph.D., 1883). He wrote for press, and The Railroad Transportation Problem. He was engaged in practice as patent attorney and electric engineer since 1883. He was the inventor of electrical devices, telephone accessories, automatic switch-boards, the teleseme, police call systems, elevator signals, chemical annunciator as well as other devices, receiving medals at Paris Exposition, 1900 and the Pan-American Exposition, Buffalo, 1901). He was the president of Herzog Teleseme Company, and other corporations.

Herzog was active in art matters. A painter, he had been a pupil of Frederick Rondel (1826-1892), and was a member of the Art Students League of New York. He was especially interested in photography, technical and artistic. Herzog was the inventor of photographic appliances. He was an exhibitor with Photo-Secession in London, Vienna, Berlin, The Hague, Brussels; exhibited independently in London, World's Fair (Portland), Corcoran Gallery of Art (Washington, D.C.) and Architectural League of New York, where his Tale of Isolde established precedent in the US as the first pictorial photograph admitted by an art society on full equality with paintings.

His work was reproduced and reviewed by leading art critics in Century, Cosmopolitan, Current Literature, Wilson's, British Journal of Photography, Camera Work, and many other standard publications. He was a member of the American Institute of Electrical Engineers (5 year member of the Council), Electrochemical Society, American Association for the Advancement of Science, and the Electrical Congress. He was a member of the International, Jury of Award (electricity) at the Louisiana Purchase Exposition; a fellow American Geographical Society, Metropolitan Museum of Art, Municipal Art Society (for several years active trustee and treasurer), National Sculpture Society, as well as the Columbia University Alumni and Columbia University Ph.D. Associations. Herzog was a Republican and a frequent delegate to local Republican conventions. He affiliated with various clubs including National Arts (ex-governor), Camera (governor and ex-president). His studio was located at the Lincoln Arcade in New York City; his residence was at 45 E. 31st Street; and his laboratory was at 13 W. 23d Street. Sadakichi Hartmann, the early photography critic, called Herzog "an independent pictorialist, with plenty of leisure and working solely for his pleasure."

Herzog spotted Audrey Munson while she was window-shopping on Fifth Avenue in 1909 and invited her to pose for him. He introduced her to his fellow-artists, launching her career as the leading artist's model of the era. Munson suggested that Herzog proposed to her so that he could protect her and that she was on the point of accepting when he died unexpectedly after intestinal surgery at Roosevelt Hospital in New York City on April 21, 1912.

== Bibliography ==
- Hamersly, Lewis Randolph (1911). Who's who in New York City and State (Public domain ed.). L.R. Hamersly Company. p. 460.
