= Troy Victor Post =

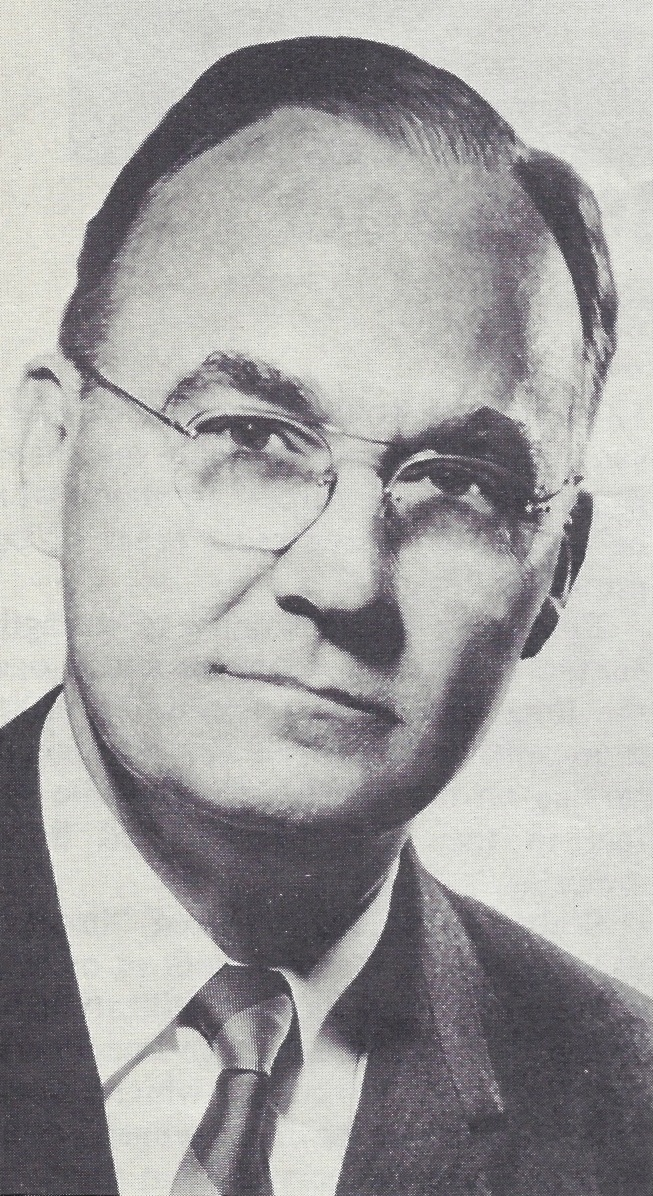
- Troy Victor Post in 1966
- Born: February 3, 1906; Haskell, Texas, United States
- Died: May 24, 1998 (aged 92); Dallas, Texas, United States
- Occupation: Insurance executive
- Spouse(s): Maurine Shook (m. 1926 - 1935), Emma Louise "Lulu" Peavy (m. 1946)
- Children: 4

Troy Victor Post (February 3, 1906 – May 24, 1998) was an American insurance entrepreneur and executive who formed one of the largest insurance conglomerates in the United States in the early 1960s. In addition to being chairman and president of his various insurance entities, Post was also chairman of the board of Dallas, Texas, based Braniff International Airways and National Car Rental beginning in 1964.

== Early years ==
Troy Victor Post was born on February 3, 1906, in Haskell, Texas. His parents were Effie Mildred Hisie Post (1880–1974), a homemaker born in Dallas, Texas, and father John Sidney Post (1876–1970), born in Spearsville, Union Parish, Louisiana, was a real estate broker. Effie and John were married in 1897, and besides Troy, the Posts had another son, Virgil H. and two daughters, Ola M. and Fay Post. The family moved to Haskell, Texas in the early 1900s, where Troy was born.

== Education and military service ==
During World War II he served as a Major in the USAAF and after returning he formed a stock life insurance company, which is an insurance company owned by its shareholder's who elect a board of directors to conduct company business. Post's shrewd business acumen propelled the startup company to the forefront of the insurance business.

== Founder of Insurance Company ==
Post married, Maurine Shook (1906–1990), of Fort Worth, Texas, in 1926 at the age of 20, and fathered a son, Troy Victor Post, Jr., who was born in 1930. In 1930, the family moved to Dallas, Texas, where he got his first full-time job with the First National Bank of Fort Worth. Post had shown an interest in banking and insurance, after he obtained the First National Bank position, and at the age of 27, Post formed his own insurance company in his hometown of Haskell, Texas. Post started his company with his meager savings of US$130.00. Post and his first wife divorced in 1935, and he moved to Houston, Texas.

Post met Emma Louise "Lulu" Peavy (September 6, 1966 – October 31, 2009) of Egewood, Texas in 1945. On January 10, 1946, the couple was married and maintained their residence in Dallas. The couple had one son, John A. Post, and two daughters, Jane Post Harelik and Judy Post Catalano.

== Greatamerica Corporation ==
In 1962, Post formed Greatamerica Corporation, one of the nation's largest insurance conglomerates, that purchased controlling interest in Dallas based Braniff Airways, Inc., in 1964. Post was the principal shareholder of Greatamerica's stock and the company was headquartered on the top floor of Jim Ling's LTV Tower in downtown Dallas.

In 1964, Mr. and Mrs. Post gave Lovers Lane United Methodist Church three acres to complete a nearly 10-acre parcel that became the church's home on the northeast corner of Northwest Highway and Inwood Road.

== Braniff Airways, Inc. ==
On July 8, 1964, Greatamerica Corporation, one of the nation's largest life insurance and financial management companies, contracted to purchase the shares of Braniff's three largest shareholders that included a group of Dallas businessmen. The group, headed by J. Erik Jonsson, a cofounder and Mayor of the City of Dallas, had purchased a controlling interest in Braniff from former Texas Senator William A. Blakley. Senator Blakley, a close associate of Tom Braniff and developer of Exchange Park in Dallas, became the custodian of the Blakley-Braniff Foundation, after Mr. Braniff's death. The foundation owned all of Mr. and Mrs. Braniff's shares that they held in Braniff as a result of provisions in Mr. Braniff's Last Will and Testament.

Greatamerica purchased 57.5 percent of Braniff outstanding shares which gave the insurance giant controlling interest in the Dallas-based international airline by a wide margin. The company paid approximately US$41,000,000.00 for 1,665,000 shares of Braniff's stock. Greatamerica initially purchased 629,629 share of Braniff Airways Common Stock for the price of US$25.00 per share. The company was able to purchase an additional 1.1 million shares, which gave it controlling interest, for the same US$25.00 price per share.

On August 12, 1964, the Braniff Airways, Inc., board of directors elected Troy Victor Post as chairman of the board. Post was chairman and president of Greatamerica Corporation, who had purchased controlling interest in Braniff in July 1964. As a result of gaining controlling interest in Braniff Airways, he was elected to the Braniff board along with two other Greatmerica officers.

== Ling Temco Vought Buys Greatamerica ==
Dallas, based Ling Temco Vought, Inc, made tender offer to Greatamerica to purchase all of its stock on August 4, 1967. The acquisition was approved by the Civil Aeronautics Board, on November 17, 1967, with stipulations that LTV greatly limit its business activities with Braniff International beyond ownership of the growing airline. At the time of the merger, Troy Post stepped down from the position of chairman of the board of Braniff Airways, Inc., and also relinquished his board position. Braniff president Harding L. Lawrence replaced Post as chairman of the board of directors.

== Board memberships ==
In addition to his duties as chairman of the board and president of Greatamerica, Post also held the following positions:

- American Life Insurance Company - chairman of the board and president
- Gulf Life Insurance Company - chairman of the board
- Franklin Life Insurance Company - chairman of the executive committee
- Amicable Life Insurance Company - chairman of the board
- First Western Bank and Trust Company, of California - chairman of the board
- National Bank of Commerce of Dallas - chairman of the board (owned 30 percent interest in the bank)
- Wells, Rich, Greene, Inc. - member, board of directors - 1966

== Honors ==
- In Process

== Publications ==
As I See It - speech written by Post for the June 1966, Achievement Awards Dinner in Dallas, Texas. The speech, in its entirety, was published in the August 1966, Braniff B Liner Employee Newsletter.

== Retirement and final years ==
Troy Victor Post died on May 24, 1998, at the age of 92 in Dallas, Texas. Services were held at Lovers Lane United Methodist Church. He was buried in the family crypt at Sparkman-Hillcrest Memorial Park, Dallas, Texas. His wife Lulu, who died in 2009, was buried next to him in the Post family crypt.
