= Lafayette Regional Airport =

Airport in Lafayette Parish, Louisiana

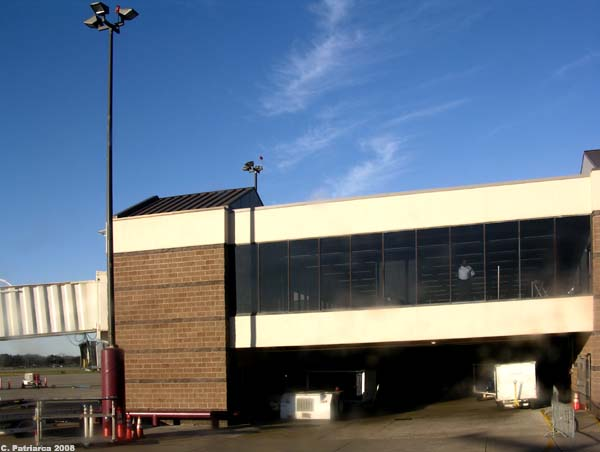
- The former Lafayette Regional Airport terminal from the tarmac before the new terminal was opened on January 20, 2022
- IATA: LFT; ICAO: KLFT; FAA LID: LFT

Summary
- Airport type: Public
- Owner: City & Parish of Lafayette
- Operator: Lafayette Airport Commission
- Serves: Lafayette, Louisiana
- Location: Lafayette Parish, near Lafayette, Louisiana
- Elevation AMSL: 42 ft (13 m)
- Coordinates: 30°12′19″N 91°59′15″W
- Website: www.LFTairport.com

Map
- Location of airport in Louisiana LFT (the United States)

Runways
Direction	Length		Surface
Direction	ft	m	Surface
04L/22R	4,099	1,249	Asphalt
04R/22L	8,000	2,438	Asphalt
11/29	5,400	1,646	Asphalt

Helipads
Number	Length		Surface
Number	ft	m	Surface
H1	50	15	Asphalt

Statistics (2018)
- Aircraft operations (year ending 2/28): 45,467
- Based aircraft: 138
- Sources: airport website and FAA

Lafayette Regional Airport(French: Aéroport régional de Lafayette) (IATA: LFT, ICAO: KLFT, FAA LID: LFT) is a public use airport two miles (4 km) southeast of Lafayette, in Lafayette Parish, Louisiana, United States. It is owned and operated by the City Parish of Lafayette.

The Lafayette Regional airport is located next to U.S. Highway 90 (future Interstate 49) on the east side of the city, close to offshore oil and gas activity in the Gulf of Mexico. Lafayette Regional is home to one of the largest helicopter companies in the world, Petroleum Helicopters International (formerly PHI-Petroleum Helicopters Inc.).

Lafayette Regional airport does not have international flights; however, regional jet service is operated nonstop to four hubs: Atlanta (ATL), Charlotte (CLT), Dallas/Fort Worth (DFW) and Houston (IAH).

== Historical airline service ==
Eastern Airlines began the first service to Lafayette in the latter 1940s with flights to Houston and New Orleans that made intermediate stops. Eastern ended their service in 1966.

Trans-Texas Airways began service in the latter 1950s with flights to Dallas, Houston, and New Orleans, all with intermediate stops. Trans-Texas became Texas International Airlines in 1969 and was merged into Continental Airlines in 1982. Continental continued serving Lafayette with nonstop service to Houston and was merged into United Airlines in 2012.

American Eagle with service on behalf of American Airlines began nonstop flights to Dallas/Fort Worth (DFW) in 1984. MetroFlight, the codeshare affiliate for American Eagle, had begun the flights to DFW under their own branding the year before in 1983. American Eagle nonstop service to Charlotte, NC was added in 2021.

Delta Connection with service on behalf of Delta Air Lines began service to DFW in 1987 and later added one-stop flights to Atlanta. Delta mainline Boeing 717-200 jet service nonstop to Atlanta was added on July 3, 2014, in addition to its regional jet flights operated by Delta Connection; however, the mainline service was soon discontinued.

Northwest Airlink with service on behalf of Northwest Airlines began flights to its hub in Memphis, Tennessee in 1991. Northwest was merged into Delta in 2010 and Delta Connection continued to serve Lafayette from Memphis through 2011.

United Airlines began expanded service from Lafayette featuring a new daily nonstop flight to Denver which became effective August 19, 2014, and was operated by its regional partner United Express until this flight was discontinued on October 23, 2015.

Allegiant Air initiated nonstop service to Las Vegas on November 3, 2011, but then discontinued these flights in February 2012.

Frontier Airlines began new service into Lafayette with Airbus A320 jetliners effective October 24, 2018 with two nonstop flights a week to Denver (DEN) as well as two nonstop flights a week to Orlando (MCO), with both of these destinations being hub cities for Frontier. Frontier ended its seasonal service to Orlando from Lafayette in August 2019 and then ended its seasonal service from Lafayette to Denver on November 10, 2019, with flights to both cities planned to resume in the spring of 2020. However, Frontier has since stated it will not be resuming flights from Lafayette with its service now suspended indefinitely.

== Passenger growth ==
The airport serves the greater Lafayette metropolitan area as well as nearby New Iberia and other population centers in south central Louisiana, which has a combined population of approximately 530,000 people. In 2019, 527,460 passengers flew in and out of the airport, the highest in its history.

== Facilities and aircraft ==
Lafayette Regional Airport (LFT) covers 746 acres (302 ha) at an elevation of 42 feet (13 m) above mean sea level. The airport officially operates two asphalt runways: 4R/22L, 8,000 by 150 feet (2,438 by 46 metres) and 11/29, 5,400 by 148 feet (1,646 by 45 metres). It has one helipad, 50 ft × 50 ft (15 m × 15 m). The airport previously had a third runway (4L/22R) which was parallel to 4R/22L and served for GA aircraft, but that runway was disabled after the airport built a new cargo ramp on the approach of the 4L's path. That runway is now used as a taxiway.

During the years in which the airport's new terminal was being constructed, 4R/22L was the only active runway at the airport, as 11/29 was closed for additions and repaving. Following its necessary work, it was used as the main taxiway to reach the terminals with its runway markers erased and removed until the old terminal was demolished and the new terminal completed construction. The airport also awaited FAA clearance to resume operations on the runway, which was achieved in mid-2024. It serves as the airport's crosswind runway, yet at 5,400 feet, it is only long enough for general aviation and light regional aircraft.

In the year ending February 28, 2022, the Lafayette Regional airport had 45,467 aircraft operations, an average of 124 per day: 53% general aviation, 34% air taxi, 2% military and 12% scheduled commercial. At that time, there were 138 aircraft based at this airport: 75 single-engine, 23 multi-engine, 27 jet and 13 helicopter.

== Airlines and destinations ==
=== Passenger ===
Airlines	Destinations
American Eagle	Charlotte, Dallas/Fort Worth
Delta Connection	Atlanta
United Express	Houston–Intercontinental

KLFT airport diagram as of September 2013

=== Top destinations ===
Busiest domestic routes from LFT (August 2025 – July 2026)
Rank	City	Passengers	Carrier
1	Houston–Intercontinental, Texas	92,400	United
2	Dallas/Fort Worth, Texas	87,640	American
3	(Georgia (U.S. state)) Atlanta, Georgia	81,760	Delta
4	Charlotte, North Carolina	21,950	American

== Cargo operations ==
Lafayette Regional Airport has now completed a new cargo terminal on the southwest side of the airfield near the PHI headquarters. It is approximately 22,500 square feet. Construction commenced in September 2010. It provides parking for several Boeing 757 aircraft on its apron and also is accessible to existing taxiways that connect to runways 4R/22L. The relocation of the cargo ramp provides cargo carriers such as UPS and FedEx direct access to U.S. Highway 90 (future Interstate 49 freeway corridor). Currently, UPS bases a Boeing 757-200 aircraft at the airport. FedEx previously based two Boeing 727-200 trijets on the airfield until this aircraft type was retired from their fleet on June 21, 2013. The FedEx Boeing 727s have now been replaced with Boeing 757-200 aircraft. These Boeing 757 jets operated by both FedEx and UPS are currently the largest aircraft to use the airport on a regular basis. DHL had operated a Douglas DC-9 aircraft configured for freight operations from Lafayette; however, this company subsequently shut down all of their flight operations in the U.S. It was envisioned by airport officials that the old cargo ramp would create more room for a planned main terminal building extension. However, the Lafayette Regional Airport has constructed a completely new passenger terminal which replaced the existing terminal. This new facility opened on January 20, 2022.

== Terminal expansion study ==
A preliminary study was conducted concerning the existing terminal building at Lafayette Regional Airport in planning for future growth and construction. Adding an extension to the terminal would have allowed Lafayette Regional Airport to handle more air traffic, which could entice international carriers to use it as a connecting airport. This would require a U.S. Customs department office stationed at the airport, which would bring Lafayette Regional Airport to "international airport" status. However, international service from Lafayette appears unlikely due to the relatively small population base in the area as well as the presence of large international and domestic passenger hubs located relatively nearby in Atlanta (Delta Air Lines), Charlotte (American Airlines), Dallas/Fort Worth (American Airlines) and Houston (United Airlines).

== New airport terminal ==
On December 6, 2014, local voters approved a ballot measure that would enable a new one percent sales tax to be collected in order to fund construction of a completely new passenger air terminal at Lafayette Regional Airport. According to an article in the Lafayette Daily Advertiser newspaper, airport officials planned to use the funds generated by the sales tax to select a design firm, finalize a design and develop construction plans. While construction of the new terminal was underway, the existing passenger terminal continued to be used. The new terminal was completed and opened for airline flights on January 20, 2022, and the previous terminal was demolished in August later that year.

Construction of the new terminal began in September 2018. As of the beginning of October 2018, the hangar that was in the area of the new terminal location had been demolished with the site cleaned up in order to allow construction of the new terminal. A public live webcam was added at the airport facing where the new terminal was under construction and could be viewed on the airport's website. The live webcam now faces the area of the previous terminal, which is now demolished.

According to the 2021 Lafayette Regional Airport annual report, all funding for the new terminal had been obtained.

The new passenger terminal was dedicated on January 19, 2022, and was then opened for airline flights on January 20, 2022. The terminal has five gates, two more than the previous terminal, and will have the ability to add two more gates if needed in the future according to airport officials.

== History ==
=== World War II ===
The airport opened as Lafayette Municipal Airport on November 29, 1930. On July 5, 1942, during World War II, the airport was commandeered by the United States Army Air Forces and used as a contract primary pilot training airfield under the AAF Gulf Coast Training Center (later Central Flying Training Command). The 384th Army Air Force Base Unit administered the contract to a civilian-operated primary flying school (Lafayette School of Aeronautics) as a sub-base of DeRidder Army Air Base, Louisiana, which also had four auxiliary airfields located nearby for emergency and overflow landings. Fairchild PT-19s were the primary trainer; several PT-17 Stearmans and a few P-40 Warhawks were assigned.

Control of the airfield was transferred from DeRidder AAB to Third Air Force (Esler Field) on March 24, 1944. The mission of base became training of replacement combat aircrews. On September 30, 1945, the airfield was deactivated and returned to civil control.

=== Postwar civil use: airline service ===
In 1948, Eastern Air Lines began the first scheduled passenger service into Lafayette. During the 1950s, Eastern operated up to ten flights a day with Martin 4-0-4 and Convair 340 twin prop "Silver Falcon" airliners with up to five flights a day to New Orleans via Baton Rouge and up to five flights a day to Houston Hobby Airport via Lake Charles, LA and Beaumont/Port Arthur, TX. According to its December 1, 1958 system timetable, Eastern was operating a daily round trip flight with a Convair 340 on a routing of Brownsville – Corpus Christi – Houston Hobby Airport – Beaumont/Port Arthur – Lake Charles – Lafayette – Baton Rouge – New Orleans – Mobile – Pensacola – Montgomery – Birmingham – Atlanta. Other Eastern flights featured continuing, no change of plane service to such destinations as Charlotte and San Antonio. Eastern served Lafayette until the mid-1960s with Convair 440 propliners when it then ceased all service into the airport.

Trans-Texas Airways (TTa) began serving Lafayette during the mid-1950s. In 1956, TTa was operating two departures a day with Douglas DC-3 aircraft to Shreveport via an intermediate stop in Lake Charles with continuing service to Dallas and on to Fort Worth via stops in the east Texas cities of Longview, Marshall and Tyler. By 1959, Trans-Texas had expanded its DC-3 service from the airport with four nonstop flights a day to New Orleans as well as two nonstop flights a day to Alexandria, LA with continuing service to Little Rock via stops in El Dorado, AR and Camden, AR in addition to maintaining its two flights a day schedule to Shreveport and Dallas. Flights to Houston were then introduced during the 1960s which were operated with Douglas DC-3 and Convair 240 propliners followed by Convair 600 turboprops. By 1969, Trans-Texas Airways had changed its name to Texas International Airlines. Also in 1969, locally-based Acadiana Airlines, a commuter air carrier, was operating scheduled passenger flights nonstop between the airport and New Orleans with five roundtrip services operated on weekdays flown with de Havilland Canada DHC-6 Twin Otter turboprop aircraft.

The first jet service into the airport was operated by Texas International Airlines (TI) with Douglas DC-9-10 twinjets to Houston, Dallas/Fort Worth, New Orleans and other cities. Texas International introduced jets into Lafayette with the DC-9 in the early 1970s. TI also served the airport with Convair 600 turboprops. According to the Official Airline Guide (OAG), during the 1970s Texas International was operating direct one stop, no change of plane DC-9 jet flights from Mexico City to Lafayette via a stop in Houston in addition to nonstop DC-9 jet service to the airport from New Orleans, Baton Rouge, Beaumont, TX and Lake Charles, LA as well as direct DC-9 flights from Dallas/Fort Worth, Abilene and San Angelo. In February 1976, TI was operating direct DC-9 jet service from Los Angeles (LAX) to Lafayette with six intermediate stops en route via Albuquerque, Roswell, NM, Midland/Odessa, TX, Dallas/Fort Worth, Houston and Beaumont. By December 1979, Texas International was operating nine jet flights a day into Lafayette with Douglas DC-9-10s and McDonnell Douglas DC-9-30s with nonstop service from Houston (IAH), New Orleans, Baton Rouge, Beaumont, TX and Lake Charles, LA with direct, no change of plane jet service from Dallas/Ft. Worth (DFW), Denver, Los Angeles (LAX), Baltimore, Salt Lake City, Albuquerque, Brownsville, TX, McAllen, Amarillo and Lubbock. In 1982, Texas International was operating three DC-9 flights a day from Dallas/Ft. Worth (DFW) to Lafayette via Houston (IAH). A fourth daily DC-9 flight was operated from Houston to Lafayette as well by TI at this time. Later that year Texas International was merged into Continental Airlines which in turn continued to serve Lafayette with Boeing 727-100, Boeing 727-200, Douglas DC-9-10 and McDonnell Douglas DC-9-30 jet flights to Houston. Continental jets were then replaced by Continental Express ATR 72, ATR 42 and Embraer EMB-120 Brasilia regional turboprop aircraft. Continental later reintroduced mainline nonstop jet service between the airport and Houston (IAH). In May 1994, Continental was operating direct one stop Boeing 727-200 service from Austin via Houston. By September 1994, Continental was operating direct McDonnell Douglas MD-80 service from New York Newark Airport to Lafayette via Baltimore and Houston.

During the 1990s, American Eagle and Delta Connection were competing with nonstop service to Dallas/Fort Worth (DFW) with American Eagle flying Saab 340 turboprops and Delta Connection (operated by code sharing partner Atlantic Southeast Airlines) flying Embraer EMB-120 Brasilia propjets. At this same time, Atlantic Southeast Airlines operating as Delta Connection was operating direct service to Atlanta with Embraer EMB-120 propjets via an intermediate stop in Meridian, MS. Delta Connection would eventually introduce Embraer ERJ-135 regional jet service to Dallas/Fort Worth which was subsequently discontinued when Delta Air Lines shut down their DFW hub operation in 2005. The American Eagle service to Dallas/Fort Worth had been previously operated by Metroflight Airlines, a division of Metro Airlines, flying Convair 580 turboprops on behalf of American Airlines via a code sharing agreement during the mid-1980s.

Several independent commuter airlines served Lafayette over the years as well. In 1970, Air East Airlines was operating nonstop service to New Orleans with up to five flights a day. Royale Airlines, based in Shreveport, Louisiana, served the airport with Beechcraft 99, Embraer EMB-110 Bandeirante, Grumman Gulfstream I and Short 330 turboprops. In November 1984 Royale was flying to Houston Intercontinental Airport and New Orleans from Lafayette with hourly shuttle service operated to both destinations on weekdays in addition to operating direct flights to Shreveport. Another commuter air carrier, Metro Airlines, served Lafayette with Short 330 turboprops nonstop to Houston Intercontinental. L'Express Airlines, based in the New Orleans area, operated nonstop to Houston Hobby Airport and New Orleans with Beechcraft turboprops. Air New Orleans served Lafayette during the mid-1980s with flights to New Orleans. Hammond Air Service flew nonstop to Houston Hobby Airport with de Havilland Canada DHC-6 Twin Otter turboprops and Piper prop aircraft. Other commuter air carriers operating nonstop service to New Orleans in the past included Vantage Airlines in 1974 and Southern Skies in 1981. In early 1987, Rio Airways was operating "TranStar SkyLink" code sharing service with Beechcraft 1900C commuter propjets on behalf of TranStar Airlines (formerly Muse Air) with seven direct one stop flights every weekday to Houston Hobby Airport (HOU) via Lake Charles, LA as well as seven nonstop flights also operated every weekday to New Orleans (MSY) with connections to TranStar jet service being available in HOU and MSY.

Past mainline jet service previously operated by Continental Airlines was also flown with Boeing 737-300 and Boeing 737-500 jetliners nonstop to Houston until Continental turned over all service into Lafayette to its regional affiliates, Continental Express operated by ExpressJet and Continental Connection operated by Colgan Air. Following the merger of Continental with United Airlines, ExpressJet and Colgan Air then became United Express air carriers. Major airline mainline jet service resumed on July 3, 2014, when Delta Air Lines began Boeing 717-200 flights between Lafayette and Atlanta. The airport was also served by Northwest Airlink with nonstop Saab 340 turboprop and Canadair CRJ200 regional jet flights to Memphis. Following the merger of Northwest Airlines with Delta Air Lines, Canadair CRJ200 regional jet service operated by Delta Connection to Memphis was discontinued. The majority of American Airlines passenger flights from the airport to Dallas/Fort Worth are currently flown with Canadair CRJ900 and Embraer ERJ-175 regional jets operated by PSA Airlines, SkyWest Airlines or Envoy Air with these air carriers operating as American Eagle on behalf of American. American Eagle also now operates CRJ700 regional jet service nonstop to Charlotte with these flights being operated by PSA Airlines on behalf of American. United Express service to Houston is operated by Republic Airlines with larger Embraer ERJ-170 regional jets and also by Mesa Airlines with larger Embraer ERJ-175 regional jets. Some American Eagle flights to DFW were being operated by ExpressJet with Canadair CRJ200 regional jets in the past. Colgan Air, operating as United Express, ceased serving Lafayette during the summer of 2012. Colgan had flown Bombardier Q400 high-speed propjets (which is the largest and fastest member of the DHC-8 Dash 8 aircraft family) as well as Saab 340 turboprops operating feeder service for United to Houston. ExpressJet replaced the Colgan service with additional Embraer ERJ-135 and Embraer ERJ-145 regional jet frequencies operating as United Express nonstop to Houston. Vision Airlines briefly served Lafayette during the summer of 2011 with Dornier 328 propjets nonstop to Ft. Walton Beach/Destin, FL via the Northwest Florida Regional Airport located on Eglin Air Force Base.

=== Current and past airline jet operations ===
The three regional airlines serving Lafayette, American Eagle, Delta Connection and United Express, currently operate regional jets on their respective flights. The exception was Delta Air Lines which began mainline service nonstop to Atlanta on July 3, 2014, using the Boeing 717-200 jetliner but is not currently operating this aircraft type into Lafayette. Delta Connection also began serving Lafayette with 76-seat Canadair CRJ900 regional jets which like the B717 feature first class, "Economy Comfort" and standard coach seating. Previously, the only mainline jet aircraft type serving Lafayette (following the cessation of Continental Airlines mainline jet service) was the twice weekly McDonnell Douglas MD-80 service flown by Allegiant Air nonstop to Las Vegas. On June 7, 2012 Delta Connection began daily service to Atlanta on Canadair CRJ700s with wi-fi, 9 first class seats, and 56 economy class seats including an enhanced "Economy Comfort" section featuring increased legroom. These flights provided the only first class service available at the time from Lafayette. In Delta's November 2012 timetable all CRJ700 service to Lafayette was replaced with smaller Canadair CRJ200s. Delta Connection then resumed dual-class service between Lafayette and Atlanta on June 10, 2013, with Canadair CRJ700 and CRJ900 regional jet flight featuring wi-fi as well as 9 First Class seats, 8 "Economy Comfort" seats and 48 Economy seats. Several of the other Delta Connection flights between LFT and ATL continue to use single class Canadair CRJ200 regional jets. The CRJ700 was the largest airliner type to serve Lafayette at this time. However, that changed when Delta began 110-seat Boeing 717 service nonstop to Atlanta on July 3, 2014. The B717, featuring first class, "Economy Comfort" and standard coach seating, was one of the larger aircraft types to serve Lafayette with scheduled passenger flights and marked the return of mainline jet aircraft service at the airport at the time. One of the largest aircraft types to previously serve Lafayette was the McDonnell Douglas MD-80 flown by Allegiant Air with nonstop service to Las Vegas before this airline ceased all flights from the airport. Another large aircraft type to serve the airport was the Airbus A320 flown by Frontier Airlines before this air carrier discontinued its service to Lafayette.

Other airlines are now operating larger regional jet types into Lafayette. United Express introduced larger Canadair CRJ700 (operated by SkyWest Airlines), Embraer ERJ-170 (operated by Republic Airlines) and Embraer ERJ-175 (operated by Mesa Airlines) regional jet service with first class and coach seating on a number of flights to Houston. American Eagle then introduced larger Canadair CRJ900 as well as Embraer ERJ-175 regional jets featuring first class and coach seating on its nonstop service to Dallas/Fort Worth in addition to its all coach ERJ-145 flights to DFW. American Eagle currently operates Canadair CRJ700 regional jets on its nonstop flights to Charlotte (CLT).

=== Previous nonstop Denver service: United Express ===
United Airlines began daily nonstop service to Denver from the airport effective on August 19, 2014. These flights were operated by United regional affiliate and code sharing partner United Express with Embraer ERJ-145 regional jets. This service marked the first time Lafayette had nonstop flights to the United hub in Denver. However, on July 27, 2015, United Airlines announced it would be ending this United Express service to Denver and the flight was discontinued on October 23, 2015.

=== Previous nonstop Denver and Orlando service: Frontier Airlines ===
Frontier Airlines began serving Lafayette on October 24, 2018, with nonstop Airbus A320 jetliner flights operated twice a week to both Denver (DEN) and Orlando (MCO) with both of these cities serving as hubs for the airline. Frontier ended its seasonal service to Orlando in August 2019 and then also ended its seasonal service to Denver on November 12, 2019, with flights to both cities said to resume in the spring of 2020. However, Frontier has since stated that it will not resume flights into Lafayette, with its service now suspended indefinitely.

=== Other notable past operations ===
In March 2001, Air Force One landed in Lafayette transporting President George W. Bush, the 43rd President of the United States. This Boeing 747-200B (USAF aircraft designation VC-25A) flight into Lafayette with President Bush on board appears to have been the largest aircraft ever to land at the airport. More recently, U.S. Air Force C-17 "Globemaster III" aircraft were flown into Lafayette. These large, four engine, military transport jets were supporting air show activities at the airfield at the time and were also later operated into the airport in order to transport motorcade vehicles for the Vice President of the United States in March 2022 when VP Kamala Harris visited Acadiana for a visit to Sunset, LA regarding new high-speed internet service. In addition, United Airlines uses Lafayette Regional as a diversion airport when inclement weather disrupts flight operations at the airline's major connecting hub located at Houston Intercontinental Airport (IAH) in Texas. Up to five Boeing 737 jetliners operated by United have been observed on the airport ramp at one time due to weather diversions.

== Accidents and incidents ==
- On December 28, 2019, a Piper PA-31T Cheyenne crashed shortly after takeoff, approximately one nautical mile from LFT. The pilot was able to avoid an apartment complex but the aircraft struck a vehicle and a USPS branch on its way down. Four passengers and the pilot were killed on impact. One passenger and one person on the ground were seriously injured, while two additional people on the ground suffered minor injuries. The NTSB released a preliminary report and is investigating the accident.

== See also ==
- List of airports in Louisiana
- Louisiana World War II Army Airfields
- 29th Flying Training Wing (U.S. Army Air Forces)
