= Jack Brooks Regional Airport =

- IATA: BPT; ICAO: KBPT; FAA LID: BPT

Summary
- Airport type: Public
- Owner: Jefferson County
- Serves: Beaumont / Port Arthur, Texas
- Location: unincorporated Jefferson County, Texas
- Elevation AMSL: 15 ft (4.6 m)
- Coordinates: 29°57′03″N 094°01′14″W
- Website: flysetx.com

Map
- Location within Texas Location within the United States

Runways
Direction	Length		Surface
Direction	ft	m	Surface
12/30	6,751	2,058	Concrete
16/34	5,071	1,546	Asphalt/Concrete

Statistics
- Aircraft operations (2022): 18,894
- Based aircraft (2022): 65
- Source: Federal Aviation Administration

Jack Brooks Regional Airport (IATA: BPT, ICAO: KBPT, FAA LID: BPT), formerly Southeast Texas Regional Airport, is in unincorporated Jefferson County, Texas, nine miles (14 km) southeast of Beaumont and northeast of Port Arthur. It was Jefferson County Airport, but its name was changed to honor former U.S. Representative Jack Brooks (D - Beaumont). The airport is southwest of the city of Nederland in unincorporated Jefferson County, and is used for general aviation. Southwest Airlines ended scheduled jet service in 1980 and several other airlines have started and ended service as well including American Eagle, Continental, Delta/Delta Connection, and United Express. The latest chapter is the resumption of service by American Eagle for American Airlines to Dallas/Fort Worth (DFW).

== Facilities ==
The Jack Brooks Regional Airport covers 1,799 acres (728 ha) and has two paved runways: 12/30 is 6,751 ft × 150 ft (2,058 m × 46 m) and 16/34 is 5,071 ft × 150 ft (1,546 m × 46 m).

In the year ending December 31, 2022, the Jack Brooks Regional Airport had 18,894 aircraft operations, average 65 per day: 84% general aviation, 9% air taxi, 5% military, and 2% airline. At that time, 65 aircraft were based at this airport: 41 single-engine, 6 multi-engine, 14 jet aircraft and 4 helicopters.

== Airlines and destinations: past & present ==
United Express (Colgan Air) Saab 340 turboprops flew to Houston (IAH) until July 1, 2012, when the airport lost all scheduled passenger air service. United Express then ran bus service to George Bush Intercontinental Airport.

American Airlines announced their American Eagle affiliate would again serve the airport effective February 14, 2013, with flights to Dallas/Fort Worth. The American Eagle service is currently operated by SkyWest on behalf of American with Bombardier CRJ700 regional jets.

=== Past airline service ===
Soon after the Jack Brooks Regional airport was built, BPT was a stop on the Houston-New Orleans route operated by Eastern Airlines which then ended its mainline service in 1966. Chicago and Southern Air Lines arrived in 1947, and successor Delta Air Lines operated mainline jet service into Beaumont/Port Arthur until 1979.

Trans-Texas Airways (TTa) and successor Texas International Airlines served the Beaumont/Port Arthur area for over 30 years. In the fall of 1949 Houston-based TTa was operating three roundtrip Douglas DC-3 flights a day on a routing of Houston Hobby Airport - Galveston - Beaumont/Port Arthur - Lufkin, TX - Palestine, TX - Dallas Love Field. Eastern Air Lines Convair 440s, Lockheed Constellations and Martin 4-0-4s flew to Houston/Hobby Airport and direct to Baton Rouge and New Orleans. Some Eastern flights continued on to Atlanta; Newark, Boston, Corpus Christi and Brownsville. Delta Air Lines began Convair 440 service in the 1950s flying a Houston Hobby Airport, TX - Beaumont/Port Arthur - Shreveport, LA - Little Rock, AR - Memphis, TN - St. Louis, MO - Chicago Midway Airport, IL routing. Delta inherited the Houston - Chicago route when it merged with Chicago & Southern Airlines with this air carrier operating Douglas DC-3s into Beaumont beginning in 1947.

Six airlines have flown jets to BPT. In the fall of 1966, Trans-Texas Airways (TTa) was operating one daily Douglas DC-9-10 jet flight to Houston Hobby Airport with propeller aircraft flights also being operated to destinations in Texas and Louisiana including Austin, Dallas Love Field, Houston Hobby Airport, El Paso, New Orleans, and San Antonio by the airline's Convair 600 turboprops as well as by Convair 240 and Douglas DC-3 prop aircraft with a total of 17 TTa departures every weekday from the airport. In the summer of 1968, Trans-Texas was operating three daily DC-9 jet flights from BPT with two nonstops to Houston Hobby Airport and one nonstop to Dallas Love Field with all other flights being operated by Convair 600 turboprops with a total of 15 TTa departures every weekday from BPT. By spring 1969, Delta Air Lines had introduced McDonnell Douglas DC-9-30 jet service with two daily flights, one operating an east and northbound routing of Houston - Beaumont/Port Arthur - Shreveport - Atlanta - New York Newark Airport and the other flight operating a south and westbound routing of New York Kennedy Airport - Atlanta - Shreveport - Beaumont/Port Arthur - Houston. Trans-Texas Airways subsequently changed its name to Texas International Airlines which in turn continued to operate Douglas DC-9-10 jets as well as Convair 600 turboprops to Houston, Dallas, and other destinations. According to the February 1, 1976 Official Airline Guide (OAG), Texas International was operating direct DC-9 jet service from Los Angeles (LAX) to Beaumont/Port Arthur via five stops en route including Albuquerque, Roswell, Midland/Odessa, Dallas/Fort Worth, and Houston. This same OAG also lists daily direct DC-9 jet service operated by Texas International from New Orleans via a stop in Lafayette, Louisiana, as well as a daily Boeing 727-200 jet flight operated by Delta flying a New York LaGuardia Airport - Atlanta - Shreveport - Beaumont/Port Arthur - Houston service.

Texas International was then merged into Continental Airlines which in turn continued operating jet service into the airport. In 1979, Southwest Airlines was operating four Boeing 737-200 flights a day nonstop to Dallas Love Field. In July 1983, Continental was flying Boeing 727-100s and McDonnell Douglas DC-9-30s nonstop to Houston (IAH). During the mid-1970s, Delta Air Lines was operating Boeing 727-200s as well as McDonnell Douglas DC-9-30s nonstop to Houston (IAH) and Shreveport as well as direct to Atlanta. Delta Connection, operated by Atlantic Southeast Airlines (ASA), flew Canadair CRJ-200s to Atlanta and Embraer EMB-120 Brasilias to Dallas/Fort Worth, with the latter service ending when Delta closed their DFW hub in early 2005. ExpressJet operating as Continental Express flew Embraer ERJ-145s to Houston (IAH). American Eagle also served the airport with Convair 580s followed by Saab 340s nonstop to Dallas/Fort Worth (DFW) for American Airlines. USAir Express Beechcraft 1900Cs flew nonstop to New Orleans for USAir.

Commuter airlines serving Beaumont/Port Arthur included Metro Airlines with de Havilland Canada DHC-6 Twin Otters and Short 330s nonstop to Houston (IAH) and Short 330s nonstop to Dallas/Fort Worth (DFW), Royale Airlines Embraer EMB-110 Bandeirantes nonstop to Houston (IAH) and direct to New Orleans, Air Texana with nonstop Beechcraft flights to Houston Hobby Airport (HOU) and Dallas Love Field (DAL) as well as nonstop Douglas DC-3s to New Orleans, and Conquest Airlines Beechcraft 1900Cs and Fairchild Swearingen Metroliners nonstop to Austin and Dallas Love Field. Conquest Airlines was based in the Beaumont/Port Arthur area before moving its headquarters to Austin where it started a hub.

In early 1985, the Jack Brooks Regional airport did not have jet service but was served by four different airlines operating a combined total of 41 flights every weekday into BPT. Most of these flights were nonstops from the Houston area with Metro Airlines operating code sharing service as Eastern Express on behalf of Eastern Airlines with eleven flights every weekday from Houston Intercontinental Airport flown with de Havilland Canada DHC-6 Twin Otter commuter aircraft while Royale Airlines was operating code sharing service as Continental Express on behalf of Continental Airlines with nine flights every weekday operated with Embraer EMB-110 Bandeirante commuter aircraft also from Houston Intercontinental for a total of 20 flights a day from IAH. At this same time, commuter air carrier Texas Airlines was operating seven nonstop flights every weekday from Houston Hobby Airport with small twin prop Piper Aircraft while Metroflight Airlines operating code sharing service as American Eagle on behalf of American Airlines was operating four flights every weekday nonstop from Dallas/Fort Worth International Airport with Convair 580 turboprops, the largest aircraft serving BPT at this time. By early 1987, Rio Airways was operating "TranStar SkyLink" code sharing service with Beechcraft 1900C commuter propjets on behalf of TranStar Airlines (formerly Muse Air) with 10 nonstop flights operated every weekday to Houston Hobby Airport (HOU) where connections were available to TranStar jet service.

== Airline and destination ==
Airlines	Destinations
American Eagle	Dallas/Fort Worth

Destination map
Destination from Jack Brooks Regional Airport

== Hurricane Rita ==
On September 24, 2005, Hurricane Rita hit the Beaumont-Port Arthur area. The then-named Southeast Texas Regional Airport passenger terminal had to be shut down with the airport authority then using the old terminal on a temporary basis. The renovated terminal reopened in May 2009 after several delays.

== See also ==
- List of airports in Texas
