= Lake Charles Regional Airport =

Airport in Louisiana, United States

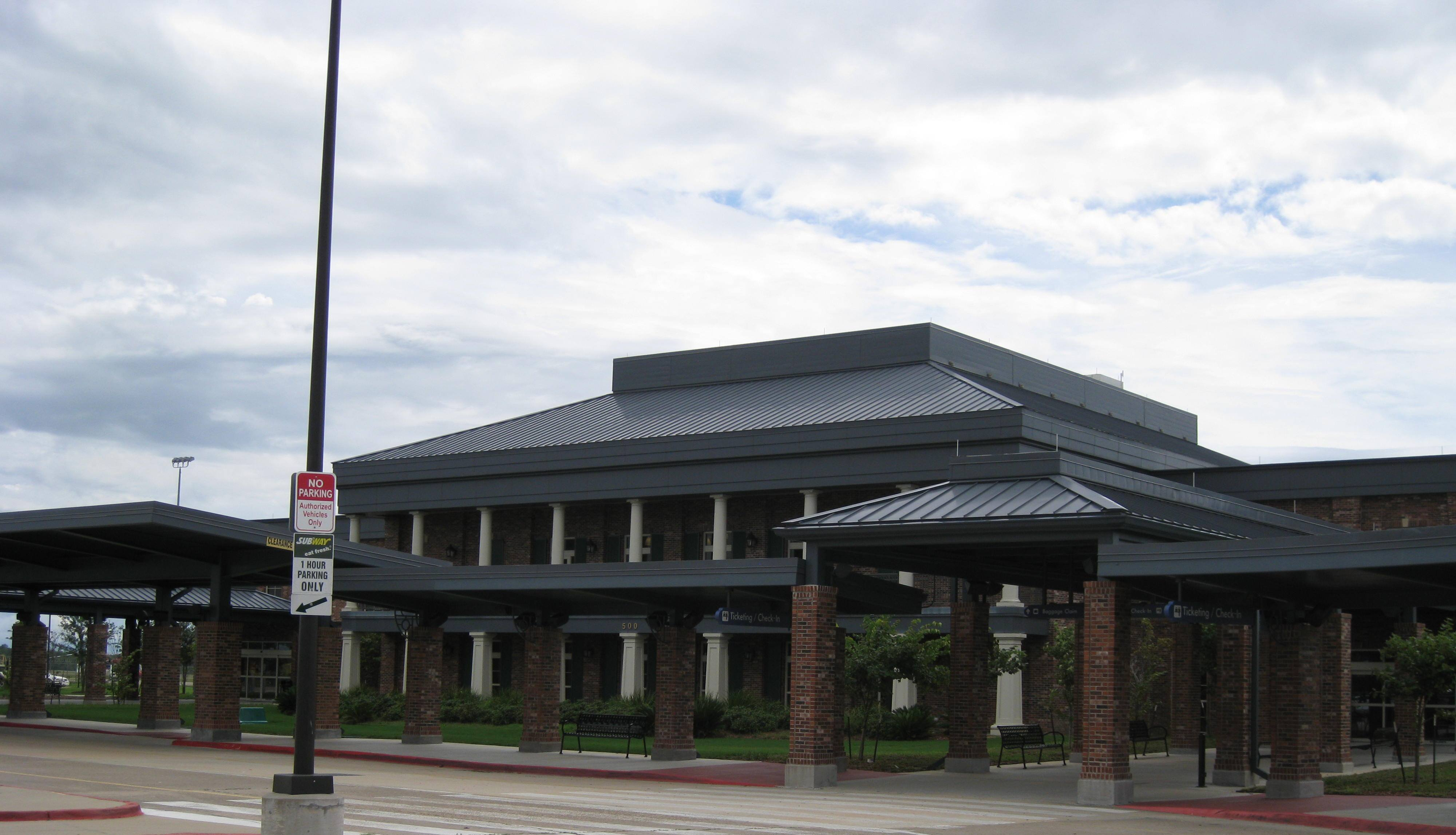
- IATA: LCH; ICAO: KLCH; FAA LID: LCH

Summary
- Airport type: Public
- Owner: Calcasieu Parish
- Serves: Lake Charles, Louisiana
- Elevation AMSL: 15 ft (4.6 m)
- Coordinates: 30°07′34″N 093°13′24″W
- Website: FlyLakeCharles.com

Map
- Location of airport in Louisiana LCH (the United States)

Runways
Direction	Length		Surface
Direction	ft	m	Surface
5/23	5,200	1,585	Asphalt
15/33	6,500	1,981	Concrete

Statistics
- Aircraft operations (2015): 31,961
- Based aircraft (2017): 93
- Source: Federal Aviation Administration

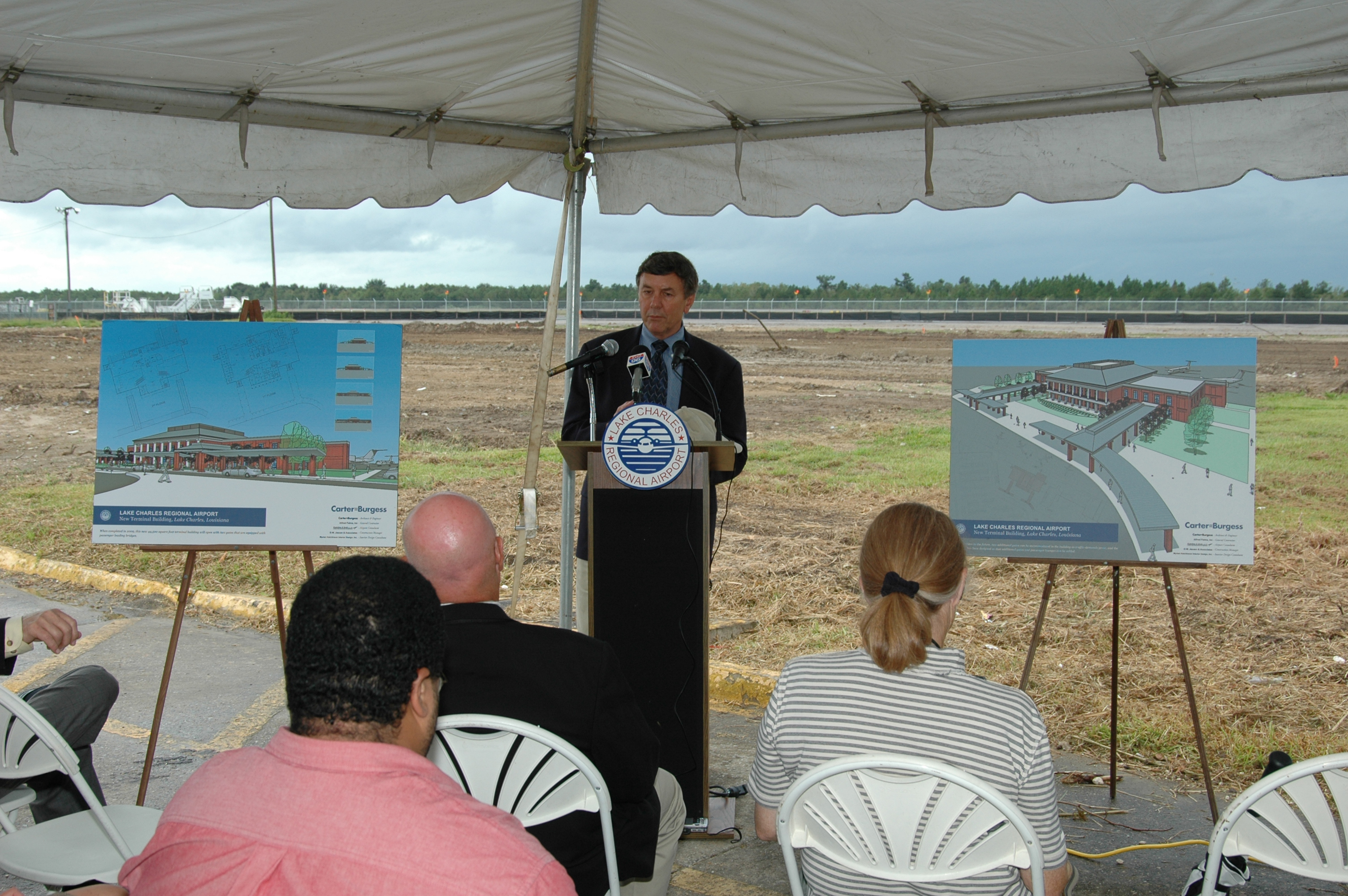
Lake Charles, LA, September 24, 2007 – Federal Emergency Management Agency (FEMA) Transitional Field Office Director Jim Stark addressed a group of local, state and federal officials on the second anniversary of Hurricane Rita and the ground breaking for the new Lake Charles Regional Airport terminal, which was completed in 2009. The new facility replaced one destroyed by Hurricane Rita. FEMA provided more than $2.7 million for the project. Photo by Manuel Broussard/FEMA.

Lake Charles Regional Airport (IATA: LCH, ICAO: KLCH, FAA LID: LCH) is a public use airport located in unincorporated Calcasieu Parish, Louisiana, United States, 5 nautical miles (9.3 km) south of the central business district of Lake Charles. Owned by Calcasieu Parish, the airport serves approximately 375,000 people in the Lake Charles – Jennings combined statistical area.

The airport has two runways. They are oriented 5/23 and 15/33 and do not cross. The grounds are bounded by Lake Street to the west, Gauthier Road to the north, Highway 385 to the east, and Lincoln Road to the south. The entrance is off of Highway 385.

A new modern terminal building was officially opened to the public in 2009. Built in the Louisiana plantation architectural style, it is a two-story terminal with one concourse. In 2009, American Eagle (now Envoy Air) began twice daily, nonstop regional jet service to Dallas/Fort Worth International Airport. American Eagle had previously served the airport with turboprop aircraft before discontinuing all flights at one point.

The airport was heavily damaged in the passing of Hurricane Laura in the early morning of August 27, 2020. The National Weather Service office located at the airport suffered a loss of its WSR-88D radar as the powerful hurricane made landfall and moved inland.

The airport received $18 million from the CARES Act during the COVID-19 pandemic, the largest amount of any airport in Louisiana. The money went towards upgrades to the airport's runways and taxiways as well as toward new lighting.

== Facilities and aircraft ==
Lake Charles Regional Airport covers an area of 1,878 acres (760 ha) at an elevation of 15 feet (5 m) above mean sea level. It has two runways: 5/23 is 5,200 by 100 feet (1,585 x 30 m) with an asphalt surface; 15/33 is 6,500 by 150 feet (1,981 x 46 m) with a concrete surface.

For the 12-months ending December 31, 2015, the airport had 31,961 aircraft operations, an average of 88 per day: 55 percent general aviation, 36% air taxi, 9% military and 1% scheduled passenger airlines. In August 2017, there were 93 aircraft based at this airport: 39 single-engine, 10 multi-engine, 3 jet and 41 helicopter.

A large number of helicopters are based at LCH and serve the petroleum industry in the Gulf and other purposes. A large marine spill operation is on the southwest corner of the grounds. The property also includes a 300-acre industrial park which provides land leases to many businesses and individuals.

== Airlines and destinations ==
Lake Charles Airport is connected to Dallas/Fort Worth International Airport by American Eagle, and to George Bush Intercontinental Airport (Houston) by United Express.

Destinations map
Destinations from Lake Charles Regional Airport

== Historical airline service ==
Historically, Lake Charles was served by Eastern Air Lines beginning in the late 1940s with Martin 4-0-4 and Convair 340 twin prop "Silver Falcon" airliner flights to Houston via Beaumont/Port Arthur and also to Baton Rouge and New Orleans via Lafayette. Some eastbound flights operated by Eastern continued on with direct, no change of plane service to Atlanta, New York/Newark Airport and Boston, although a number of intermediate stops were made en route. In 1958, Eastern was operating daily round trip Convair 340 service on a routing of Brownsville – Corpus Christi – Houston Hobby Airport – Beaumont/Port Arthur – Lake Charles – Lafayette – Baton Rouge – New Orleans – Mobile – Pensacola – Montgomery – Birmingham – Atlanta. Eastern ceased all flights to Lake Charles during the mid-1960s when it withdrew its Convair 440 propliner service.

Trans-Texas Airways (TTa) began serving Lake Charles during the mid-1950s with Douglas DC-3 aircraft flying a routing of Lafayette – Lake Charles – Shreveport – Longview, TX – Tyler, TX – Dallas Love Field – Fort Worth. By 1959, TTa had expanded its DC-3 service with direct flights to Houston via Beaumont/Port Arthur and also direct to Jackson, MS via Alexandria and Natchez, MS. Trans-Texas then introduced Convair 240 service and in 1961 was flying nonstop to Houston and Monroe, LA as well as direct to Dallas, New Orleans, Little Rock, Memphis, San Antonio and other destinations. By the mid-1960s, Trans-Texas was serving the airport with Convair 600 turboprop flights primarily to Houston, New Orleans and Baton Rouge. Trans-Texas Airways subsequently changed its name to Texas International Airlines (TI) and introduced Douglas DC-9-10 jetliner service from Lake Charles to Houston and New Orleans with direct service to Dallas/Ft. Worth. Together, TTa and TI served Lake Charles for over 25 years with aircraft as diverse as DC-3s to DC-9s. According to the Official Airline Guide (OAG), in April 1975 Texas International was operating ten flights a day into the airport with these services including nonstop DC-9 jet service from Houston George Bush Intercontinental Airport, New Orleans, Shreveport, Lafayette, LA and Beaumont, TX as well as direct, no change of plane DC-9 jet flights from Mexico City, Dallas/Fort Worth, Austin, Abilene and San Angelo. By December 1979, TI was operating all of its Lake Charles flights with jets including the larger McDonnell Douglas DC-9-30 as well as the Douglas DC-9-10 with nonstop service from Houston, Baton Rouge and Lafayette as well as direct, no change of plane flights from Dallas/Fort Worth, New Orleans, Denver, Brownsville, TX, McAllen, Amarillo and Lubbock.

Royale Airlines, which was a commuter air carrier based in Louisiana, served the airport with Beechcraft 99 and Embraer EMB-110 Bandeirante turboprop flights from Houston, New Orleans, Baton Rouge, Lafayette, Shreveport and Fort Polk. Following the merger of Texas International Airlines into Continental Airlines, Royale Airlines provided service for Continental via a code sharing agreement to and from Houston George Bush Intercontinental Airport (IAH) utilizing Grumman Gulfstream I propjets as well as Embraer EMB-110 Bandeirante turboprops. This passenger feeder service for Continental to and from Houston was subsequently taken over by Continental Express which operated ATR-42 and Embraer EMB-120 Brasilia turboprops. In later years, Colgan Air operating as Continental Connection and later as United Express flew Saab 340 turboprop service nonstop to Houston on behalf of Continental and then United Airlines following the merger of Continental and United.

By the late 1980s, American Eagle had begun service to Lake Charles and by the mid-1990s was operating Saab 340B turboprop service from the airport to two American Airlines hubs at the time: nonstop to Dallas/Ft. Worth (DFW) with direct, one stop flights to Nashville (BNA) via Gulfport, MS before ending these propjet flights. American Eagle then resumed service to Lake Charles several years later with nonstop flights to DFW.

Metro Airlines, a commuter air carrier, served Lake Charles as well with Short 330 turboprop service to Houston George Bush Intercontinental Airport (IAH) operated independently and also operated Eastern Express service to IAH with de Havilland Canada DHC-6 Twin Otter turboprops via a code sharing agreement with Eastern Air Lines during the mid-1980s. In early 1987, Rio Airways was operating "TranStar SkyLink" code sharing service with Beechcraft 1900C commuter propjets on behalf of TranStar Airlines (formerly Muse Air) with seven nonstop flights operated every weekday to Houston Hobby Airport (HOU) as well as seven direct one stop flights also operated every weekday to New Orleans (MSY) via Lafayette, LA with connections to TranStar jet service being available in HOU and MSY. In late 1989, L'Express Airlines, another commuter air carrier, was operating direct, one stop service from its New Orleans hub via a stop in Lafayette with Beechcraft turboprops.

== Current regional jet airline service ==
Currently, Envoy Air and SkyWest Airlines both operating as American Eagle (airline brand) serve Lake Charles with aircraft varying from the Embraer ERJ-145 (Envoy) to the CRJ-700 (SkyWest) series regional jet aircraft. Envoy Air and SkyWest fly nonstop to Dallas/Fort Worth International Airport (DFW) on behalf of American Airlines while United Express, also operating Embraer ERJ-145 as well as Canadair CRJ-200 regional jets, serves the United Airlines hub located at Houston George Bush Intercontinental Airport (IAH) with nonstop flights from Lake Charles.

== Statistics ==
Carrier shares (August 2025 – July 2026)
Carrier	Passengers (arriving and departing)
Envoy Air	98,250(53.79%)
CommuteAir	71,990(39.41%)
SkyWest Airlines	12,410(6.79%)

Top domestic destinations from LCH (August 2025 – July 2026)
Rank	Airport	Passengers	Airline
1	Dallas/Fort Worth International (DFW)	54,200	American Eagle
2	George Bush Intercontinental (IAH)	38,100	United Express

== See also ==
- List of airports in Louisiana
