= Texas Gulf Coast Regional Airport =

- IATA: LJN; ICAO: KLBX; FAA LID: LBX

Summary
- Airport type: Public
- Owner: Brazoria County
- Serves: Angleton / Lake Jackson, Texas
- Location: 0 County Road 220, Angleton, Texas 77515
- Elevation AMSL: 25 ft (7.6 m)
- Coordinates: 29°06′31″N 095°27′44″W
- Website: www.flylbx.org

Map
- Location of airport in Texas / United States LBX (the United States)

Runways
Direction	Length		Surface
Direction	ft	m	Surface
17/35	7,000	2,134	Concrete

Statistics (2020)
- Aircraft operations: 77,981
- Based aircraft: 98
- Source: Federal Aviation Administration

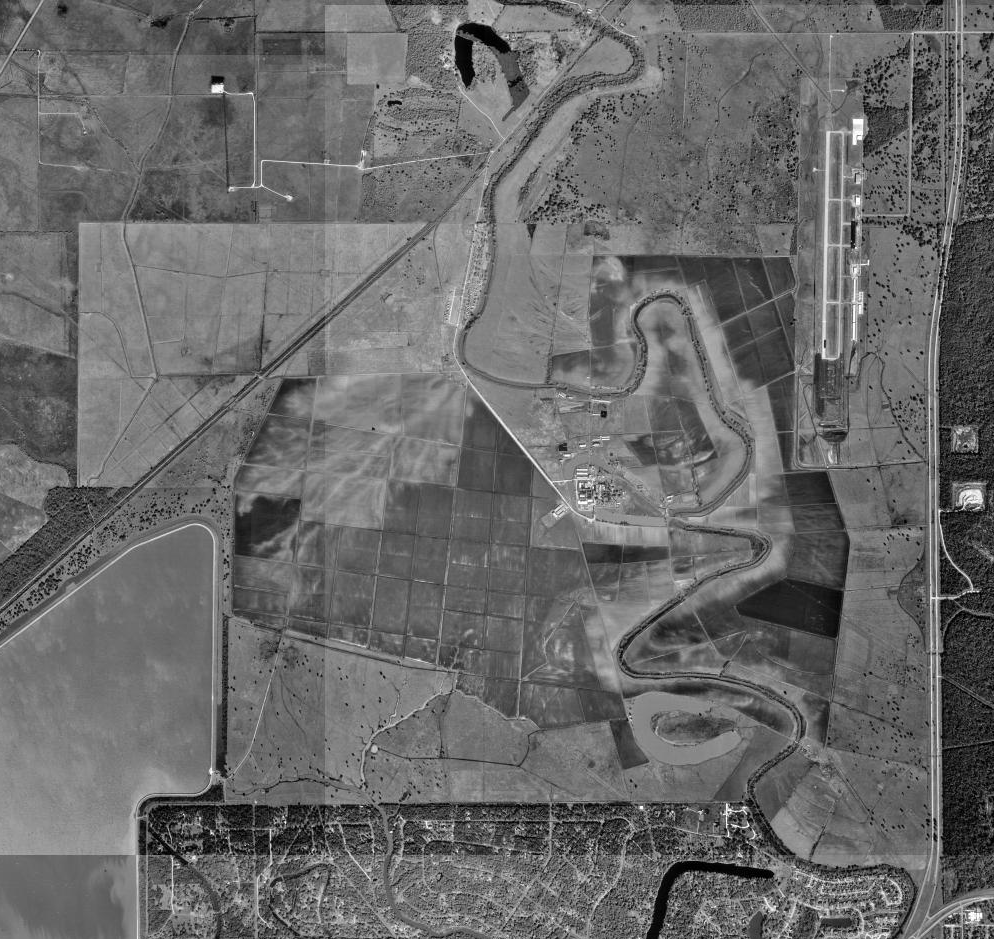
the Texas Gulf Coast Regional Airport and the Wayne Scott (Retrieve) Unit, January 23, 1995 - U.S. Geological Survey

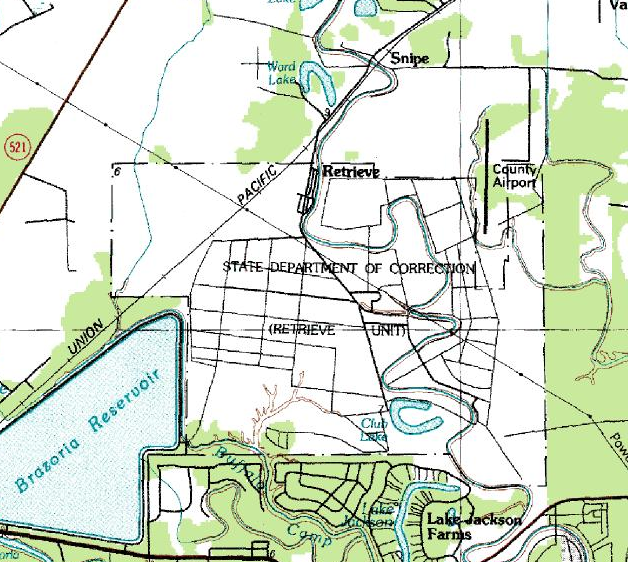
Topographical map of the Texas Gulf Coast Regional Airport and the Retrieve Unit (Wayne Scott Unit), July 1, 1984 - U.S. Geological Survey

Texas Gulf Coast Regional Airport (IATA: LJN, ICAO: KLBX, FAA LID: LBX), previously known as Brazoria County Airport, is a county-owned public-use airport in unincorporated Brazoria County, Texas, United States, in Greater Houston, located 4 miles (6.4 km) southwest of the central business district of Angleton and north of Lake Jackson.

Although most U.S. airports use the same three-letter location identifier for the FAA and IATA, Texas Gulf Coast Regional Airport is assigned LBX by the FAA and LJN by the IATA (which assigned LBX to Lubang Airport in the Philippines).

On March 24, 2010, the Brazoria County Commissioners' Court voted to change the name of the airport to Texas Gulf Coast Regional Airport, effective October 1, 2010.

== Facilities and aircraft ==
Texas Gulf Coast Regional Airport covers an area of 674 acres (273 ha) which contains one concrete paved runway (17/35) measuring 7,000 x 100 ft (2,134 x 30 m). For the 12-month period ending January 1, 2021, the airport had 77,981 aircraft operations, an average of 214 per day: 95% general aviation, 4% air taxi, 1% military, and <1% commercial. There were at that time 98 aircraft based at this airport: 82 single-engine, 9 multi-engine, 2 jet and 5 helicopter.

The airport's runway was closed in December 2009 for a major reconstruction project, in which the runway's former asphalt surface was replaced with concrete. During the runway closure, aircraft temporarily used the airport's main taxiway for takeoffs and landings. Larger aircraft, such as the Aerodynamics (ADI) Dynajet Airbus ACJ (A319) operated as a shuttle service for Dow Chemical, were diverted to William P. Hobby Airport in Houston during the runway closure. The runway reconstruction project was completed in July 2010, and the airport became fully operational once again.

Bristow U.S. LLC, which is one of the largest Part 135 commercial helicopter operators in the world, currently operates a base at the airport serving the offshore oil and gas industry in the nearby Gulf of Mexico. Turbine powered helicopter types operated by Bristow in the past from LBX include the AgustaWestland AW139, Bell 206L-4 "Long Ranger IV", Bell 407, Eurocopter EC135, Sikorsky S-76C++ and Sikorsky S-92. Bristow U.S. is part of the Bristow Group.

The airport's on-site restaurant, the Windsock Restaurant, closed in February 2011. Following renovations, the building was reopened as the Crosswind Cafe in December 2011. It was subsequently closed and reopened under new management with a seafood influenced menu as the Runway Cafe in 2014.

== Airline history ==
In the late 1970s and early 1980s, Texas Gulf Coast Regional Airport was linked to the national airway grid with regularly scheduled airline service. Among some of the more unusual routes were nonstop flights to Victoria, Texas and the Clear Lake City STOLport which were served as extensions or as an intermediate stop on the regularly scheduled passenger route between then-named Brazoria County Airport and Houston Intercontinental Airport (IAH) as this airport was called prior to airline deregulation.

In the 1980s, the old Lake Jackson Dow Airport (LJN) near Lake Jackson's town center was closed following the construction and opening of the new Brazoria County Airport north of the city limits of Lake Jackson. Prior to the opening of the present airport, in February 1976 Houston Metro Airlines was operating six nonstop flights every weekday from the old airport (LJN) to Houston (IAH) with de Havilland Canada DHC-6 Twin Otter STOL turboprops as well as two nonstop flights every weekday from LJN to Victoria (VCT), also with Twin Otters. The old Lake Jackson Dow Airport was also the site of an emergency landing of a hijacked National Airlines (NA) Boeing 727-200 jetliner which was followed by a short standoff by the hijackers with law enforcement personnel on July 12, 1972..

Following the opening of the Brazoria County Airport (LBX), Metro Airlines, which by then had changed its name from Houston Metro Airlines, occasionally used larger, flight attendant staffed Short 330 commuter airliner turboprops in addition to the smaller de Havilland Canada DHC-6 Twin Otter STOL turboprops on flights to and from Houston Intercontinental (IAH). In April 1981, Metro Airlines was operating six nonstop DHC-6 Twin Otter flights every weekday from the new LBX airport to IAH. Other regional aircraft serving LBX in scheduled airline service included Royale Airlines Embraer EMB 110 Bandeirante turboprops as well as Beechcraft Model 99 turboprops. Royale, which had taken over the service at LBX from Metro Airlines, functioned as a feeder airline for Continental Airlines to and from IAH prior to Royale's bankruptcy and subsequent cessation of all flight operations. Several other small commuter air carriers served the airport as well over the years. In 1971, Amistad Airlines was operating turboprop service from the old Lake Jackson Dow Airport (LJN) to both Houston Hobby Airport (HOU) and to Houston Intercontinental Airport (IAH). In 1985, Texas Airlines operated service to Houston Intercontinental which were flown with Piper prop aircraft.

Other air carriers that have served Texas Gulf Coast Regional Airport in the past include Comair operating Canadair CRJ regional jet aircraft and Aerodynamics Inc. (ADI) flying Fokker F28 Fellowship jets and Airbus A319 jetliners.Both of these air carriers were operating scheduled corporate charters via respective contracts for Dow Chemical shuttling employees to and from Dow Chemical's Midland Michigan facilities.

Currently, Dow Chemical operates two corporate-owned Bombardier (Canadair) CRJ-900 aircraft from the airport flying its employees to and from MBS International Airport in Freeland, Michigan and also to Baton Rouge Metropolitan Airport in Louisiana.

At present, no regularly scheduled commercial passenger airline service is offered from this airfield.

== See also ==
- List of airports in Texas
