= Flight 508 =

Flight 508 may refer to:

- LANSA Flight 508, crashed in Peru in 1971. Sole survivor walked through jungle.
- L'Express Airlines Flight 508, crashed approaching Birmingham, Alabama airport in 1991
