= L'Express Airlines =

IATA	ICAO	Call sign
LEX	—	LEX
- Founded: 1989; 37 years ago
- Ceased operations: 1992; 34 years ago
- Hubs: MSY & HOU
- Fleet size: 10
- Destinations: 11
- Headquarters: Kenner, LA
- Key people: Stephen Read

L'Express Airlines, Inc. was an airline that was conceived as a regional airline to provide service to cities throughout Louisiana from its hub at New Orleans International Airport from 1989 to 1992. The airline's headquarters was in Kenner, Louisiana in Greater New Orleans, and it commenced service on August 9, 1989. It was a subsidiary of Read Industries, Inc., a company with headquarters in New Orleans, Louisiana.

== History ==
Originally announced in April 1989, L'Express was founded by local entrepreneur Stephen Read with the intention of providing an intrastate airline to serve the major cities of Louisiana. The airline originally served New Orleans, Baton Rouge, Shreveport, Monroe, Alexandria, Lafayette and Lake Charles with 45 weekly flights. Service was originally to commence in June 1989, however, service began later that August. For its first year, the airline saw gross revenues of $7 to $8 million.

By September 1990 L'Express was looking to expand service into other areas of the Gulf South area outside Louisiana. Service was first expanded to Houston, Birmingham and Mobile with future plans to expand to Jackson and Little Rock in Fall 1990 and to both Pensacola and Dallas/Fort Worth by winter 1991.

Due to increasing fuel costs, on January 9, 1991, L'Express filed for Chapter 11 bankruptcy protection. The airline continued to operate, operating 80 daily flights by the summer of 1991 In February 1992, the airline ceased operations after its nine planes were repossessed by the finance company of their manufacturer, The Beech Aircraft Corporation, due to non-payment. Grounded on February 15, airline officials officially shut down its operation on February 28.

== Fleet ==
- 7 Beechcraft C-99s
- 3 Beechcraft 1900s

With the company being based out of New Orleans, the color scheme included stripes of the traditional Mardi Gras colors of green, yellow and purple painted across white aircraft.

== Destinations ==
Service beginning in August 1989:

- Louisiana
  - Alexandria (Alexandria International Airport – AEX)
  - Baton Rouge (Baton Rouge Metropolitan Airport – BTR)
  - Lafayette (Lafayette Regional Airport – LFT)
  - Lake Charles (Lake Charles Regional Airport – LCH)
  - Monroe (Monroe Regional Airport – MLU)
  - New Orleans (New Orleans International Airport – MSY) – Primary Hub
  - Shreveport (Shreveport Regional Airport – SHV)

Service beginning in September 1990:

- Texas
  - Houston (William P. Hobby Airport – HOU)
- Alabama
  - Birmingham (Birmingham International Airport – BHM)
  - Mobile (Mobile Regional Airport – MOB)

Service beginning in 1991:

By October 1991, L'Express was operating from Houston Hobby Airport to both Lafayette and Longview, Texas.

- Texas
  - Longview (East Texas Regional Airport – GGG)

== Accident ==
- On July 10, 1991, a L'Express Beechcraft C-99 (Registration N7217L), flying as Flight 508, crashed while attempting to make an ILS approach at Birmingham International Airport in Birmingham, Alabama. The plane crashed in the Ensley neighborhood and subsequently injured four persons on the ground, as well as destroying two homes. Of the 15 occupants on board, there were 13 fatalities. The cause of the crash was attributed to the captain's decision to attempt an instrument approach into severe thunderstorms resulting in a loss of control of the airplane.

== See also ==
- List of defunct airlines of the United States
