= Metro Airlines =

US airline (1969–1993)

Metro Airlines Inc.
IATA	ICAO	Call sign
HY	MTR	METRO
- Founded: 1969; 57 years ago
- Ceased operations: May 1993; 33 years ago
- Operating bases: Clear Lake City STOLport; Dallas/Fort Worth International Airport
- Alliance: American Eagle
- Subsidiaries: See Metro holding company acquisitions and subsidiaries below
- Fleet size: See Turboprop fleet below
- Destinations: See Destination sections below
- Headquarters: Houston, Texas, United States; Grapevine, Texas, United States

Metro Airlines, originally Houston Metro Airlines, was a commuter airline that was originally headquartered in Houston, Texas, United States. Metro subsequently moved its headquarters to north Texas. The airline had an operational base located on the grounds of Dallas/Fort Worth International Airport and also had offices on the airport property and in Grapevine, Texas. Metro evolved into an airline holding company with the acquisition or creation of a number of different airlines, including as the banner carrier (commercial aviation) operating feeder services for Eastern Airlines as Eastern Metro Express which was based in Atlanta, GA and Metroflight which operated American Eagle service from the Dallas/Ft. Worth Airport. In 1993 it ceased operations due to bankruptcy.

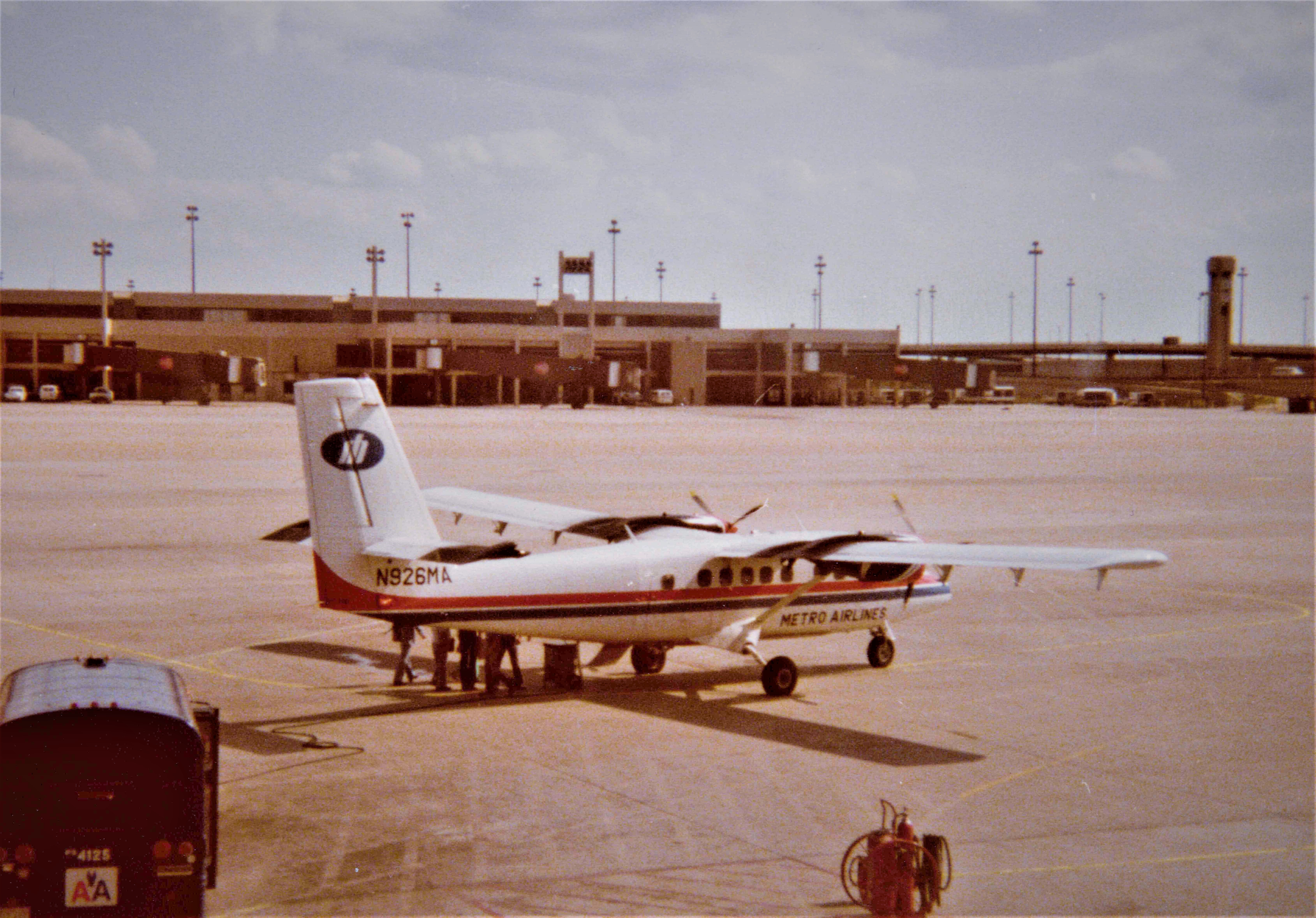
Metro Airlines DHC-6 Twin Otter at DFW

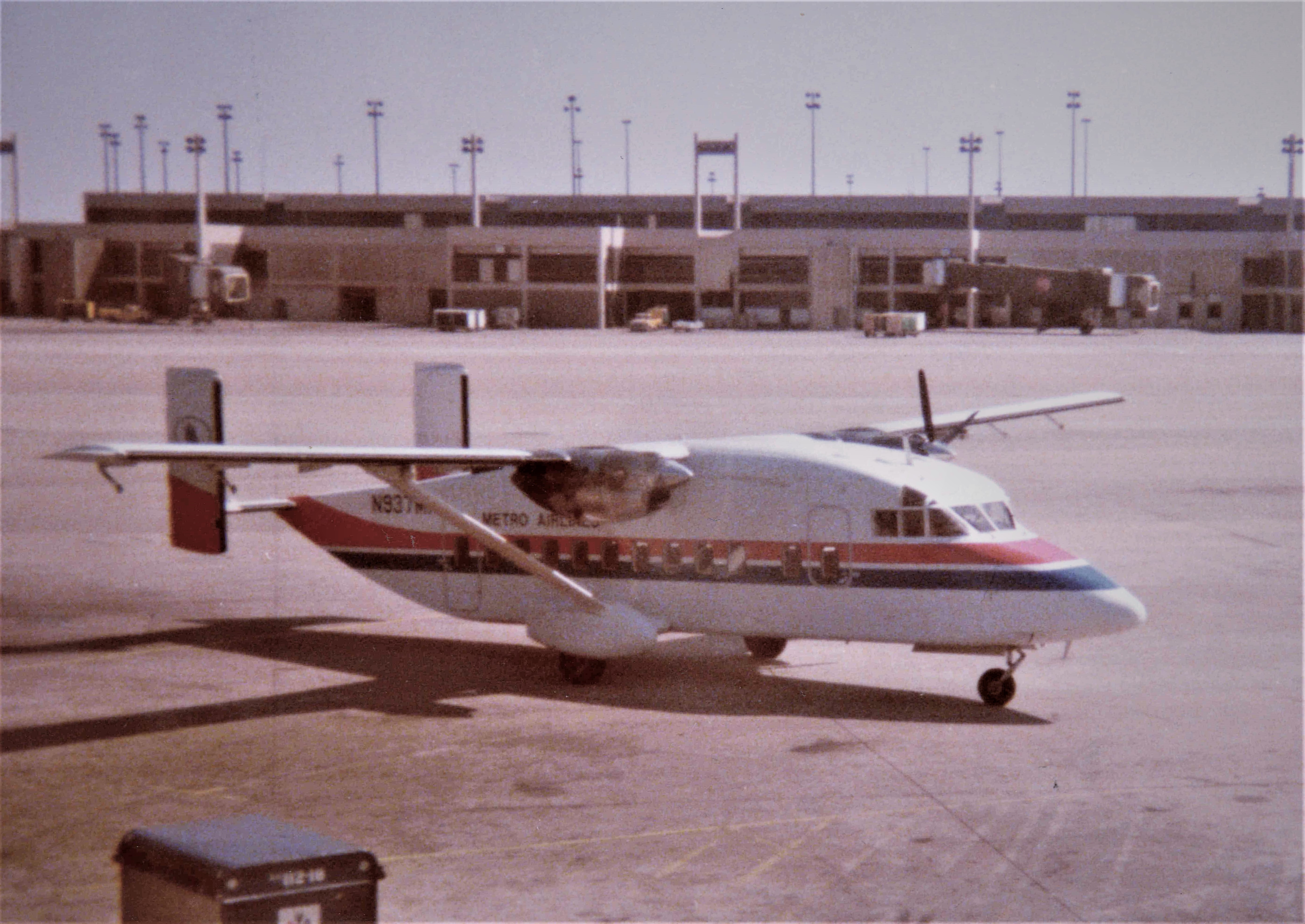
Metro Airlines Shorts 330 at DFW

== History ==
In 1969 the airline was founded to serve the Houston area with "cross-town" flights. Houston Metro Airlines constructed their own 2,500 foot, short take-off and landing (STOL) airstrip along with a passenger terminal building and maintenance hangar adjacent to Clear Lake City, Texas near the NASA Johnson Space Center. The Clear Lake City STOLport was essentially Houston Metro's own private airport. The airline's initial route linked Clear Lake City (CLC) with Houston Intercontinental Airport (IAH) which opened in 1969. In early 1970, Houston Metro was operating two routes: Clear Lake City - Houston Intercontinental and Houston Hobby Airport (HOU) - Houston Intercontinental. The February 1, 1970 Houston Metro timetable lists 24 round trip flights every weekday between the CLC STOLport and Houston Intercontinental and 14 round trip flights every weekday between Houston Hobby and Houston Intercontinental. According to the February 1976 edition of the Official Airline Guide (OAG), the airline was operating 22 roundtrip flights every weekday in its passenger shuttle operation between Clear Lake City and Houston Intercontinental. The route system was later expanded to include a number of destinations in southeast and south Texas with flights to Houston Intercontinental. At one point, the airline also flew between Laredo, TX (LRD) and San Antonio, TX (SAT). All initial Houston Metro service was operated with de Havilland Canada DHC-6 Twin Otter twin turboprop STOL aircraft as the Clear Lake City STOLport was specifically designed for this aircraft. Additional new service was later extended to Lafayette, LA (LFT) and Lake Charles, LA (LCH) with flights to Houston Intercontinental (IAH) with these services being operated with larger Short 330 twin turboprop aircraft. The Short 330 was also utilized by Metro for flights between IAH and Beaumont/Port Arthur (BPT) where one was destroyed by a tornado in 1983 while sitting empty on the airport ramp (see Accidents and incidents below).

In 1972 the airline carried between 90,000 and 100,000 passengers per year. It displayed a profit of $156,510 U.S. dollars in an eight-month period.

In early 1974, to capitalize on a perception among Dallas residents that Dallas Love Field was more convenient than the newly-opened Dallas Fort Worth International Airport (DFW), Metroflight inaugurated seven-minute Twin Otter flights between Love and DFW. Airfare was only $10 ($65.28 in 2025), advertised as less than a typical one-way taxi fare between Dallas and DFW. However, the service proved unprofitable, and it was discontinued in September 1975.

In 1978 Metro entered the "stand up widebody cabin age" when the first orders for five (5) Short 330 twin turboprops were announced. These Irish-manufactured aircraft would be used to complement the Twin Otters already in use on higher demand routes as well as new service to Lafayette, LA and Lake Charles, LA and offered far more comfortable seating for passengers. The addition of the 30 passenger Short 330 turboprops required Metro to make provisions for flight attendants and also resulted in the carrier joining the ranks of the regional airline industry via its use of larger aircraft. The company was also independently operating flights from the DFW at this time with DHC-6 Twin Otter and Short 330 aircraft with services to several destinations in east Texas with some of these flights continuing on to or originating from Houston Intercontinental (IAH). These Twin Otter and Short 330 passenger services into DFW were flown by the Metroflight Airlines division which would eventually operate American Eagle flights. Metroflight also independently served several destinations in Oklahoma and north Texas from Dallas/Ft. Worth and Oklahoma City (OKC).

In 1982 Metro purchased fourteen (14) Convair 580 aircraft from the original Frontier Airlines. These 50 passenger twin turboprops were then used to initiate the first ever American Eagle service via a new code sharing passenger feed agreement with American Airlines. The Convair 580 aircraft were operated by the Metroflight Airlines division which also flew DHC-6 Twin Otter aircraft on American Eagle services.

Metro Airlines operated out of DFW via its wholly owned Metroflight division under the American Eagle brand beginning on November 1, 1984. In 1985 the airline announced that it would end service to Houston Intercontinental Airport (now George Bush Intercontinental Airport). Royale Airlines, a commuter/regional air carrier based in Louisiana, then assumed many of the routes that were previously operated by Metro into Houston. However, in 1987 Royale declared bankruptcy and ceased all scheduled passenger flight operations.

=== Acquisitions and subsidiaries ===
Metro Airlines spun off its certificated airline, being Metro Airlines, and formed an airline holding company. Among the commuter and regional air carriers acquired or created by Metro were:

- Brockway Air - acquired in the summer of 1989, Metro changed Brockway's name to Metro Air Northeast, and operated as a banner carrier codeshare partner flying as TWExpress on behalf of Trans World Airlines (TWA). This operation ended in mid-1991.
- Chaparral Airlines - purchased in 1987 by Metro Airlines; its aircraft were merged into the operations of wholly owned subsidiary Metroflight for "the American Eagle codeshare branded banner flying". Chaparral had operated American Eagle service primarily from Dallas/Fort Worth International Airport (DFW) on behalf of American Airlines before being merged into Metroflight in 1990.
- Metro Express also operated as American Eagle from 1985 through 1987 flying British Aerospace BAe Jetstream 31 and Short 330 turboprop aircraft from DFW. Metro Express was then merged in with Chaparral Airlines.
- Metro Express II - spun off from the original Metro Airlines for "the Eastern Express codeshare branded banner flying". This regional airline was based in Atlanta, GA and operated as Eastern Metro Express flying British Aerospace BAe Jetstream 31 and de Havilland Canada DHC-8-100 Dash 8 twin turboprop aircraft. Eastern Metro Express provided passenger feed at the Eastern Air Lines hub located at Atlanta Hartsfield International Airport (ATL).
- Sunaire - name changed to Aviation Associates. This commuter air carrier operated as Eastern Express in the Caribbean flying de Havilland Canada DHC-6 Twin Otter turboprops and providing passenger feed at the Eastern Air Lines hub located at the Luis Muñoz Marín International Airport (SJU). Service was flown to St. Croix (STX), St. Thomas (STT), Tortola, BVI (EIS), Virgin Gorda, BVI (VIJ), Mayaguez, PR (MAZ), and St. Maarten, N.A. (SXM), and other short haul destinations in the Caribbean. The Eastern Express service was primarily operated from San Juan although point-to-point flights between various other islands were flown as well. The Twin Otter was well suited for flights into Virgin Gorda as the airport runway on this island was an unpaved sand and gravel airstrip at the time.
- Eastern Metro Express - Metro also operated feeder services as Eastern Express for Eastern Air Lines to and from Houston Intercontinental Airport (IAH) during the mid-1980s flying de Havilland Canada DHC-6 Twin Otter turboprops. Destinations served on a nonstop basis from IAH by this Eastern Express service included Beaumont/Port Arthur, TX (BPT); Clear Lake City, TX (CLC), Lake Charles, LA (LCH); Longview, TX (GGG); Sugar Land, TX (SGR); Tyler, TX (TYR); and Victoria, TX (VCT). Metro was also operating Eastern Express service at this time from San Antonio International Airport (SAT) with service to Laredo, TX (LRD)

=== Bankruptcy ===
In 1991 Metro went into Chapter 11 bankruptcy reorganization and then in May 1993 Metro Airlines went completely out of business. The airline assets were promptly purchased and renamed by AMR Corporation whom were already involved with Metro Airlines by way of the "banner carrier" codeshare flying that Metro performed for AMR via its Metroflight division with these services being created cooperatively by the legacy carrier, being American Airlines, and the regional, being Metro subsidiary Metroflight, as American Eagle during the mid-1980s. Under AMR many of Metroflight's assets found their way over to Simmons Airlines.

Houston Metro's original home, being the Clear Lake City STOLport located in the Houston area near the NASA Johnson Space Center, was abandoned and subsequently demolished in order to make way for suburban development. There is currently no trace of this pioneering airfield to be seen.

In later years, Continental Express, a regional airline and a regional airline brand; and at that time survivor of the post-deregulation and highly controversial Houston based Texas Air Corporation Continental Airlines and Eastern Air Lines acquisition years, operated scheduled passenger air service from Ellington Field (EFD) near the former site of the Clear Lake City STOLport. Much like the original Houston Metro, and subsequent Eastern Metro Express short hop operations by amicable partner Metro Airlines; short hop Continental Express flights commenced during the 1980s, utilizing ATR-42 and Embraer EMB-120 Brasilia turboprops and then Embraer ERJ-135 regional jets to transport connecting passengers across the city to Houston George Bush Intercontinental Airport (IAH). However, this service was finally discontinued as well.

== Destinations ==
Houston Metro and Metro

These destinations were served by Houston Metro Airlines during and after its name change to Metro Airlines from its Clear Lake City headquarters, with de Havilland Canada DHC-6 Twin Otter turboprops and/or Short 330 turboprops:

- Beaumont/Port Arthur, TX (BPT)
- Brazoria County, TX (Brazosport) (LBX)*
- Clear Lake City, TX STOLport (CLC)**
- Corpus Christi, TX (CRP)
- Galveston, TX (GLS)
- Houston, TX (IAH)* - Hub
- Lafayette, LA (LFT)
- Lake Charles, LA (LCH)
- Lake Jackson, TX (LJN)**
- Laredo, TX (LRD)
- San Antonio, TX (SAT)
- Sugarland/Houston, TX Hull Field (SGR)*
- Victoria, TX (VCT)

* Renamed Airports
Brazoria County Airport (LBX), Houston Intercontinental Airport (IAH), Hull Field (SGR)
** Permanently Deactivated Airports
Clear Lake City STOLport (CLC), Lake Jackson (LJN)

== Destinations on behalf of American, Eastern and Trans World Airlines ==
Metroflight destinations d/b/a American Airlines Metroflight

These destinations were initially served independently by the Metroflight division with de Havilland Canada DHC-6 Twin Otter aircraft:

- Altus, OK (AXS)
- Dallas/Ft. Worth, TX (DFW) - Hub
- Enid, OK (WDG)
- Houston, TX (IAH)
- Lawton, OK (LAW)
- Longview, TX (GGG)
- Lufkin, TX (LFK)
- McAlester, OK (MLC)
- Nacogdoches, TX (OCH)
- Oklahoma City, OK (OKC) - Hub
- Paris, TX (PRX)
- Ponca City, OK (PNC)
- Stillwater, OK (SWO)
- Tyler, TX (TYR)
- Wichita Falls, TX (SPS)

Metroflight began codeshare services for American Airlines on November 1, 1984 flying Convair 580 turboprops as American Eagle to the following destinations:

- Beaumont/Port Arthur, TX (BPT)
- Dallas/Fort Worth, TX (DFW) - Hub
- Fayettteville, AR (FYV)
- Fort Smith, AR (FSM)
- Lafayette, LA (LFT)
- Lake Charles, LA (LCH)
- Lawton, OK (LAW)
- Longview, TX (GGG)
- Springfield, MO (SGF)
- Tyler, TX (TYR)

Saab 340 turboprop aircraft and additional destinations were added beginning in late 1987.

Metro Express destinations d/b/a American Eagle (1985 through 1987)

These destinations were served with British Aerospace Jetstream 31 and/or Short 330 turboprops:

- College Station, TX (CLL)
- Dallas/Fort Worth, TX (DFW) - Hub
- Kileen, TX (ILE)
- Monroe, LA (MLU)
- San Angelo, TX (SJT)
- Texarkana, TX/AR (TXK)
- Waco, TX (ACT)
- Wichita Falls, TX (SPS)

Metro Express II destinations d/b/a Eastern Metro Express

These destinations were served with British Aerospace BAe Jetstream 31 turboprops and/or with de Havilland Canada DHC-8-100 Dash 8 turboprops:

- Albany, GA (ABY)
- Asheville, NC (AVL)
- Atlanta, GA (ATL) - Hub
- Augusta, GA (AGS)
- Bristol/Kingsport/Johnson City (TRI, the Tri-Cities Regional Airport serving this area in TN and VA)
- Chattanooga, TN (CHA)
- Columbus, GA (CGS)
- Dothan, AL (DHN)
- Ft. Walton Beach, FL (VPS)
- Gulfport/Biloxi, MS (GPT)
- Hilton Head Island, SC (HHH)
- Huntsville, AL (HSV)
- Knoxville, TN (TYS)
- Lexington, KY (LEX)
- Macon, GA (MCN)
- Moultrie, GA (MGR) (one flight a day)
- Montgomery, AL (MGM)
- Myrtle Beach, SC (MYR)
- Panama City, FL (PFN, airport now closed)
- Wilmington, NC (ILM)

Aviation Associates destinations d/b/a Eastern Express

After the acquisition of the airlines "Sunaire" and the subsequent name change to "Aviation Associates," de Havilland Canada DHC-6 Twin Otter 250 & 300 turboprops served the following destinations:

- San Juan, PR (SJU) - Hub
- Fajardo, PR (FAJ)
- Mayaguez, PR (MAZ)
- Ponce, PR (PSE)
- Vieques, PR (VQS)
- St. Croix, USVI (STX) - Hub
- St. Thomas, USVI (STT)
- Tortola/Beef Island, BVI (EIS)
- Virgin Gorda, BVI (VIJ)
- St. Maarten, N.A. (SXM)

Metro (Houston, TX division) - Destinations d/b/a Eastern Express

Many of these destinations were previously served by Metro Airlines on an independent basis prior to a marketing alliance with Eastern Airlines and were operated with Metro's very own DHC-6 Twin Otter aircraft:

- Beaumont/Port Arthur, TX (BPT);
- Clear Lake City, TX (CLC),
- Lake Charles, LA (LCH);
- Longview, TX (GGG);
- Sugar Land, TX (SGR);
- Tyler, TX (TYR); and
- Victoria, TX (VCT).

Metro was also operating Eastern Express service at this time from San Antonio International Airport (SAT) with service to Laredo, TX (LRD)

Metro Air Northeast destinations d/b/a TWExpress

After the acquisition of the airline "Brockway Air" and its subsequent name change to "Metro Air Northeast," Beech-1900C and Saab-340A commuter aircraft served the following destinations upon TWA's TWExpress network:

- See Brockway Air Destinations

== Fleet ==
- British Aerospace BAe Jetstream 31 (flown by Eastern Metro Express on behalf of Eastern Air Lines and based in Atlanta, GA)
- Beechcraft Model 99
- de Havilland Canada DHC-6 Twin Otter (originally operated by Houston Metro and later by Metro and Metroflight. Also operated as Eastern Express in the Caribbean and in feeder services from both Houston Intercontinental Airport and San Antonio International Airport as Eastern Express on behalf of Eastern Air Lines)
- de Havilland Canada DHC-8-100 Dash 8 (flown by Eastern Metro Express on behalf of Eastern Air Lines and based in Atlanta, GA)
- Short 330
- Convair 580 (aircraft were branded and operated as American Eagle flights)

== Accidents and incidents ==
- Beechcraft 99 crashed upon takeoff from Galveston in 1974.
- Short 330 destroyed by a tornado at Beaumont, Texas on May 20, 1983.
- On September 3, 1987, an Eastern Metro Express pilot fell off a Beechcraft 99 as the airplane was flying from Lewiston Municipal Airport in Lewiston, Maine to Boston Logan International Airport in Boston, Massachusetts. The plane's co-pilot was able to land at Portland International Jetport in Portland, Maine, after declaring an emergency. The pilot was hanging from some cable railings and his feet were stuck on the plane's door jamb, and he missed being decapitated by only six inches once the airplane touched down on the runway. The pilot and co-pilot were the only occupants; the pilot had a hand injury but they both survived.

== See also ==
- List of defunct airlines of the United States
