= Clear Lake City STOLport =

Former airport near Clear Lake City, Texas

Coordinates: 29.5609°N 95.1407°W

Clear Lake City STOLport (IATA: CLC) was an airport owned by Houston Metro Airlines, a commuter air carrier. It was located adjacent to Clear Lake City on Texas State Highway 3 (also known as Old Galveston Highway) approximately two miles west of the NASA Johnson Space Center, southeast of Ellington Air Force Base (now Ellington Field).

The airfield featured a single paved northwest–southeast 2,500 foot runway, with a ramp, maintenance hangar and terminal building on the southeast side. Houston Metro's primary route was to and from Houston Intercontinental Airport, along with other airports in southeast Texas.

== History ==
According to the February 1, 1970 Houston Metro timetable, the airline operated 24 round trip flights on weekdays to Houston Intercontinental with flights departing every 30 minutes during certain periods of the day.

The STOLport was constructed and initially operated by Houston Metro Airlines which flew de Havilland Canada DHC-6 Twin Otter twin engine turboprop commuter aircraft featuring Short Take Off and Landing (STOL) performance. Houston Metro then changed its name to Metro Airlines and ceased serving the CLC STOLport with service then provided by Royale Airlines which operated Twin Otter flights to Houston Intercontinental before going out of business. The STOLport was then abandoned and the land was redeveloped.
