= L'Express Airlines Flight 508 =

1991 aviation accident

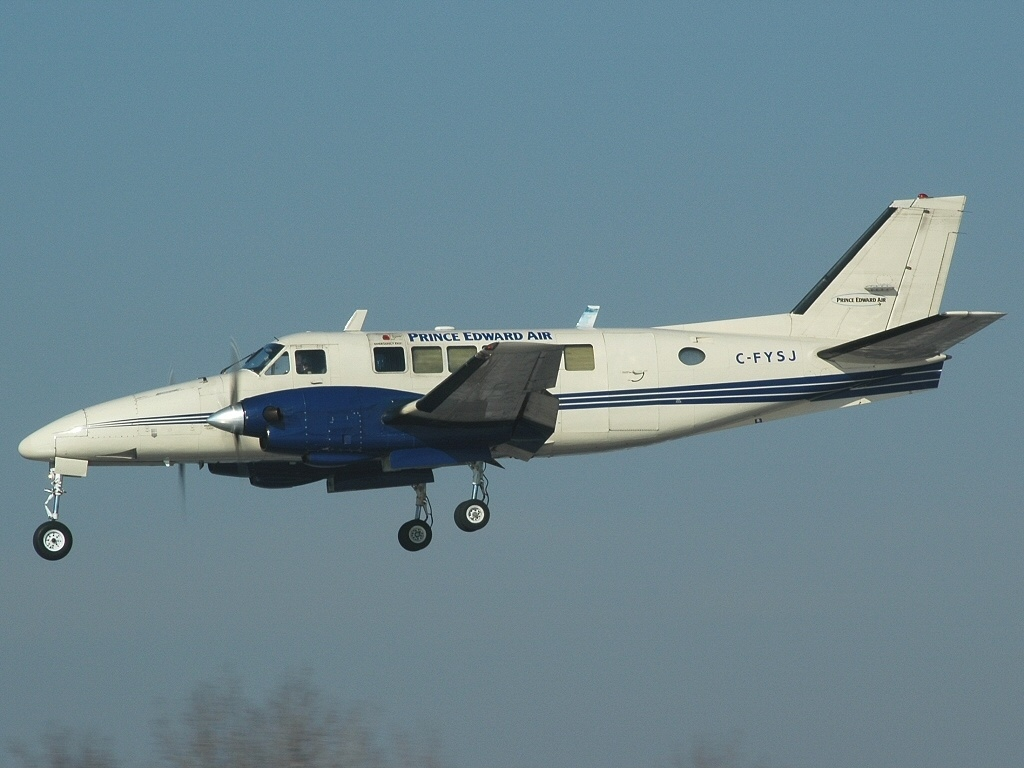
- A Beechcraft Model 99 similar to the accident aircraft

Accident
- Date: July 10, 1991
- Summary: Bad weather-induced collision with obstacles and nearby terrain
- Site: Birmingham Municipal Airport, Birmingham, Alabama, United States; 33°30′10″N 86°52′28″W
- Total fatalities: 13
- Total injuries: 6

Aircraft
- Aircraft type: Beechcraft C99
- Operator: L'Express Airlines
- Call sign: LEX 508
- Registration: N7217L
- Flight origin: Mobile Regional Airport, Alabama
- Destination: Birmingham Municipal Airport, Alabama
- Occupants: 15
- Passengers: 13
- Crew: 2
- Fatalities: 13
- Injuries: 2
- Survivors: 2

Ground casualties
- Ground injuries: 4

On July 10, 1991, a L'Express Airlines Beechcraft C99, flying as Flight 508 originating in New Orleans, and in transit from Mobile to Birmingham, crashed while attempting to make an ILS approach to Runway 5 (since renumbered to Runway 6) at Birmingham Municipal Airport (now Birmingham–Shuttlesworth International Airport) in Birmingham, Alabama. The plane crashed in the Fairview area near Five Points West in the Ensley neighborhood and subsequently injured four persons on the ground, as well as destroying two homes. Of the 15 occupants on board, there were 13 fatalities. The cause of the crash was attributed to the captain's decision to attempt an instrument approach into severe thunderstorms resulting in a loss of control of the airplane. To date it is the deadliest commercial aviation accident in Alabama history.

== Flight ==
L'Express Flight 508 was operated with a Beech C99 twin-engine turboprop aircraft. Seating on the plane was five rows of two seats, one on each side of a central aisle. A single seat was located across from the left passenger loading door and a double seat at the rear of the aircraft. Passengers boarded through the rear passenger door. The flight left New Orleans, LA with one passenger, at 4:05 pm CDT, landing in Mobile, AL, at 4:50 pm CDT. After changing crews and boarding 12 passengers, the flight departed for Birmingham Municipal Airport at 5:05 pm CDT.

As the flight approached Birmingham, Alabama, strong to severe thunderstorms developed in the vicinity of the airport. Around the same time four other aircraft either diverted to other airports or delayed their approach and entered a holding pattern until the weather had improved. The crew of Flight 508 was aware of the strong to severe thunderstorm activity but the crew chose to continue the approach. Francis Fernandes, the L'Express captain at the controls of Flight 508, later said the plane experienced a "significant roll to the left" on landing approach. Fernandes told investigators that while he and the first officer, Richard Windham, tried to level the aircraft, it experienced an "extreme updraft" that pushed the plane's nose into the air.

After entering a severe thunderstorm cell southwest of the airport, the crew lost directional control and was unable to recover the aircraft prior to impacting two houses in the Ensley neighborhood of Birmingham at 6:11:27 pm CDT. The Beechcraft C99 Airliner airplane had crashed and struck one home, crossed a tree lined residential street, and slammed into a second home, and then immediately erupting and burst into flames. The residents in both houses have evacuated to safety The lone surviving passenger was encountered in the home by the residents before all fled the burning home. The captain was taken to the UAB Hospital, a passenger to the Caraway Methodist Medical Center, and three residents on the ground were transported to the Baptist Princeton Hospital. Twelve passengers and the first officer had died after they perished in the fiery crash; the captain, one passenger, and four residents on the ground were injured but survived; and only one resident on the ground sustained minor injuries but survived.

== Media coverage ==
The accident occurred during the 6:00 p.m. local evening news broadcasts. Local media reports began around 6:45 pm CDT with local ABC television affiliate WBRC broadcasting live coverage by that time. Radio and television coverage of the crash continued through the night. Notably, WBRC was recording weather radar images around the time of the crash, these images would later be used in the official NTSB investigation and other crash-related litigation. Coverage of the crash was carried on the front page of newspapers nationwide in the days following the accident.

== NTSB investigation ==
The National Transportation Safety Board (NTSB) dispatched a team to investigate the accident. The focus of the investigation was immediately centered on the weather at the time of the accident. Investigators were surprised by the presence of a cockpit voice recorder in the airplane as such recorders were not required for the involved airplane at the time. Following a detailed investigation, the NTSB issued its final report on March 3, 1992; AAR-92/01. The formal probable cause of the accident was "the decision of the captain to initiate and continue an instrument approach into clearly identified thunderstorm activity, resulting in a loss of control of the airplane from which the flightcrew was unable to recover and subsequent collision with obstacles and the terrain."
