= Royale Airlines =

American regional airline

IATA	ICAO	Call sign
OQ	RAY	ROYALE AIR
- Commenced operations: 1968; 58 years ago
- Ceased operations: 1989; 37 years ago
- Operating bases: Shreveport Regional Airport
- Hubs: Houston Intercontinental Airport & Louis Armstrong New Orleans International Airport
- Alliance: Continental Airlines
- Fleet size: See Fleet below
- Destinations: See Destinations below
- Headquarters: Shreveport, Louisiana, United States

Royale Airlines was a regional airline with headquarters on the grounds of Shreveport Regional Airport (SHV) in Shreveport, Louisiana.

== Operations ==
Royale operated scheduled passenger flights in Louisiana, Texas, Mississippi, Tennessee and Florida from 1962 to 1989. It primarily operated turboprop aircraft such as the Embraer EMB-110 Bandeirante, Beechcraft Model 99, Short 330 and Grumman Gulfstream G-I with the latter being a regional airliner version of Grumman's successful propjet business aircraft. Royale also flew two Douglas DC-9-14 jetliners on services from Houston Intercontinental Airport (IAH) primarily to Brownsville, Texas (BRO) on behalf of Continental Airlines. According to the Official Airline Guide (OAG), in 1988 Royale was operating DC-9 jet service into four cities located in the state of Louisiana including Alexandria, Baton Rouge, New Orleans and Shreveport. For a short period between 1985 and 1986 Royale operated de Havilland Canada DHC-6 Twin Otter aircraft acquired from Metro Airlines which had moved its operations to the Dallas-Fort Worth Metroplex in Texas and also to Atlanta, Georgia. These Twin Otter STOL (Short Take Off and Landing) turboprop aircraft were primarily utilized to shuttle passengers between the Clear Lake City STOLport (CLC), which was located near the NASA Johnson Space Center, and Houston Intercontinental Airport (now George Bush Intercontinental Airport, IAH).

Royale also operated as a Continental Commuter and Continental Express air carrier via a code sharing agreement with Continental Airlines and provided passenger feed at Continental's Houston hub (IAH) during the final years of operation prior to its bankruptcy Chapter 11 filing on September 9, 1987.

== Destinations ==
Royale Airlines served the following destinations at various times during its existence:

- Alexandria, Louisiana
- Austin, Texas
- Baton Rouge, Louisiana
- Beaumont/Port Arthur, Texas
- Brownsville, Texas
- Clear Lake City, Texas
- College Station, Texas
- Dallas, Texas (Love Field)
- Greenwood, Mississippi
- Fort Polk, Louisiana
- Houma, Louisiana
- Houston, Texas (Intercontinental Airport) - Hub
- Jackson, Mississippi
- Lafayette, Louisiana
- Lake Charles, Louisiana
- Lake Jackson, Texas
- Laredo, Texas
- Laurel/Hattiesburg, Mississippi
- Memphis, Tennessee
- Morgan City/Patterson, Louisiana
- Monroe, Louisiana
- Natchez, Mississippi
- New Orleans, Louisiana - Hub
- Oxford/University, Mississippi
- Pensacola, Florida
- San Antonio, Texas
- Shreveport, Louisiana - Home base
- Victoria, Texas

== Fleet ==
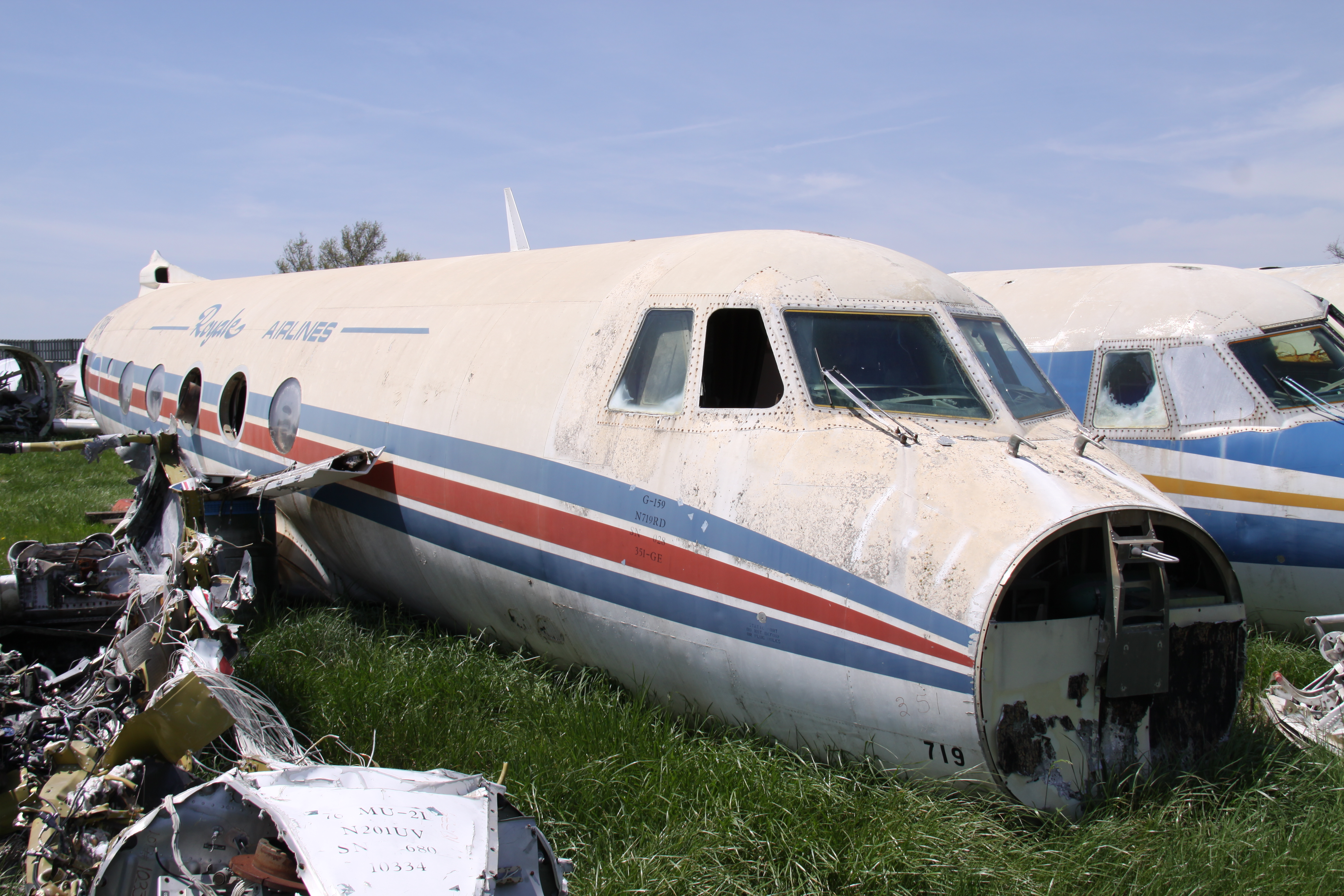
Remains of a Royale Airlines Grumman G-159 Gulfstream I fuselage stored at Rantoul, Kansas

- Beechcraft 99
- de Havilland Canada DHC-6 Twin Otter
- Douglas DC-9-10 - only jet aircraft type operated by Royale
- Embraer EMB-110 Bandeirante
- Grumman Gulfstream I (model G-159)
- Short 330

== Cessation of operations ==
The airline encountered financial difficulties and then ceased operations during the late 1980s when its Chapter 11 bankruptcy filing of 1987 was changed to Chapter 7 bankruptcy in February 1989.

== See also ==
- List of defunct airlines of the United States
