= William P. Hobby Airport =

Airport in Houston, Texas, United States

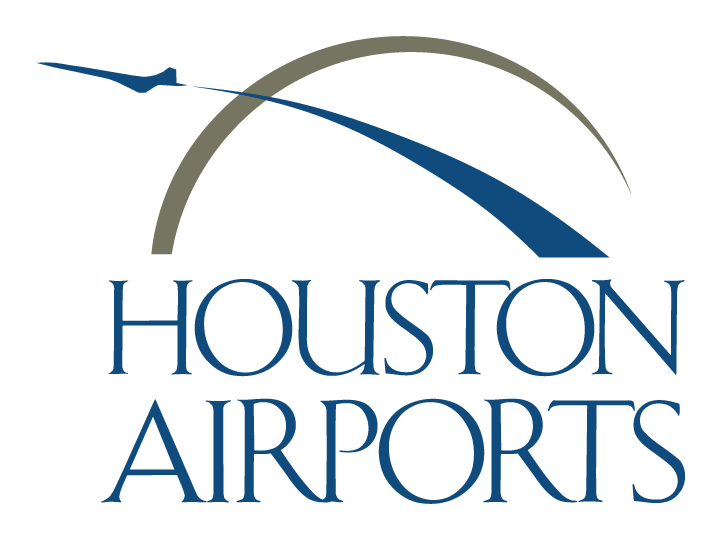

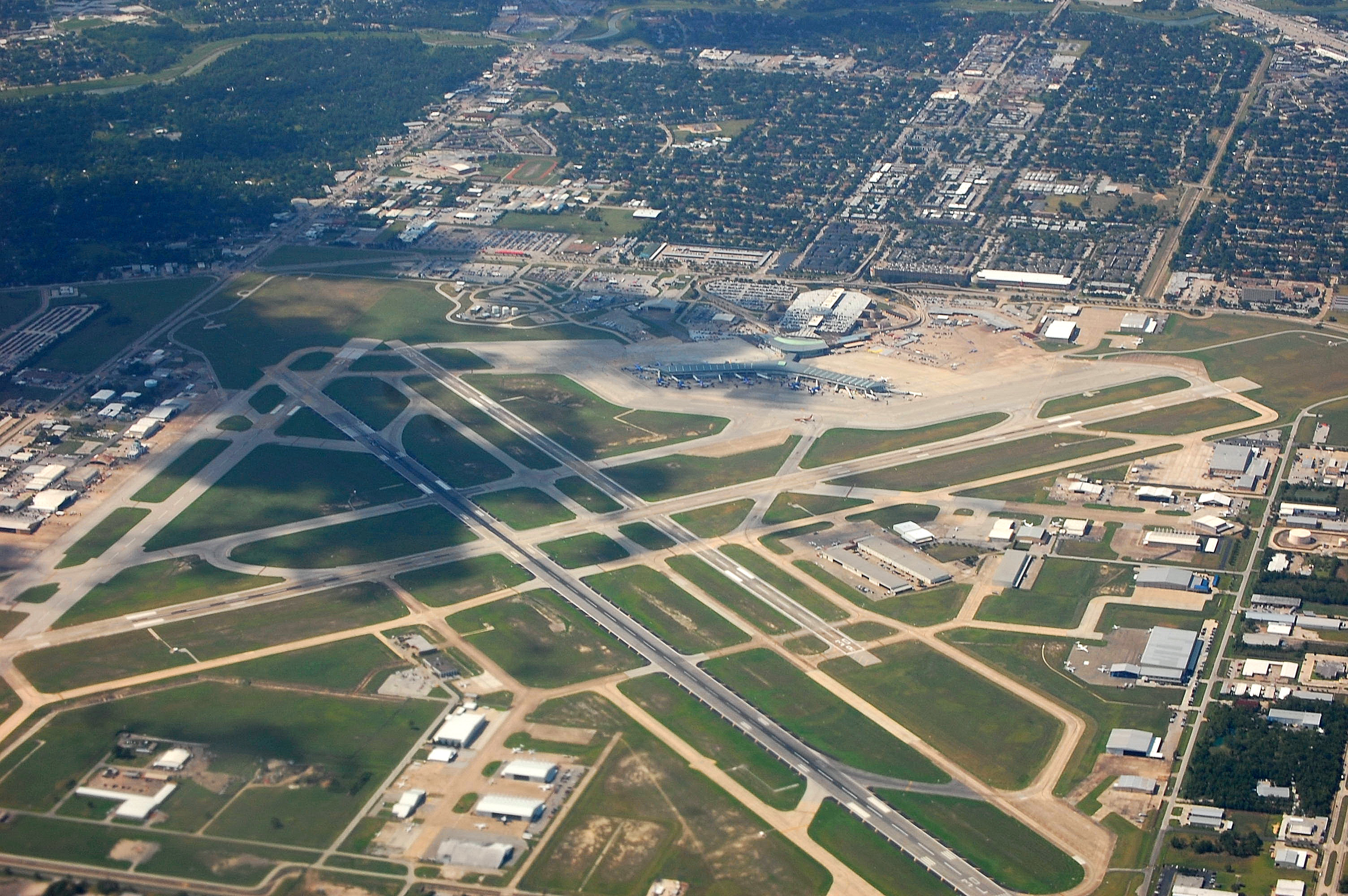
- IATA: HOU; ICAO: KHOU; FAA LID: HOU; WMO: 72244

Summary
- Airport type: Public
- Owner: City of Houston
- Operator: Houston Airport System
- Serves: Greater Houston
- Location: Houston, Harris County, Texas, U.S.
- Opened: June 1927; 99 years ago
- Operating base for: Southwest Airlines
- Elevation AMSL: 46 ft (14 m)
- Coordinates: 29°38′44″N 95°16′44″W
- Website: www.fly2houston.com/hou

Maps
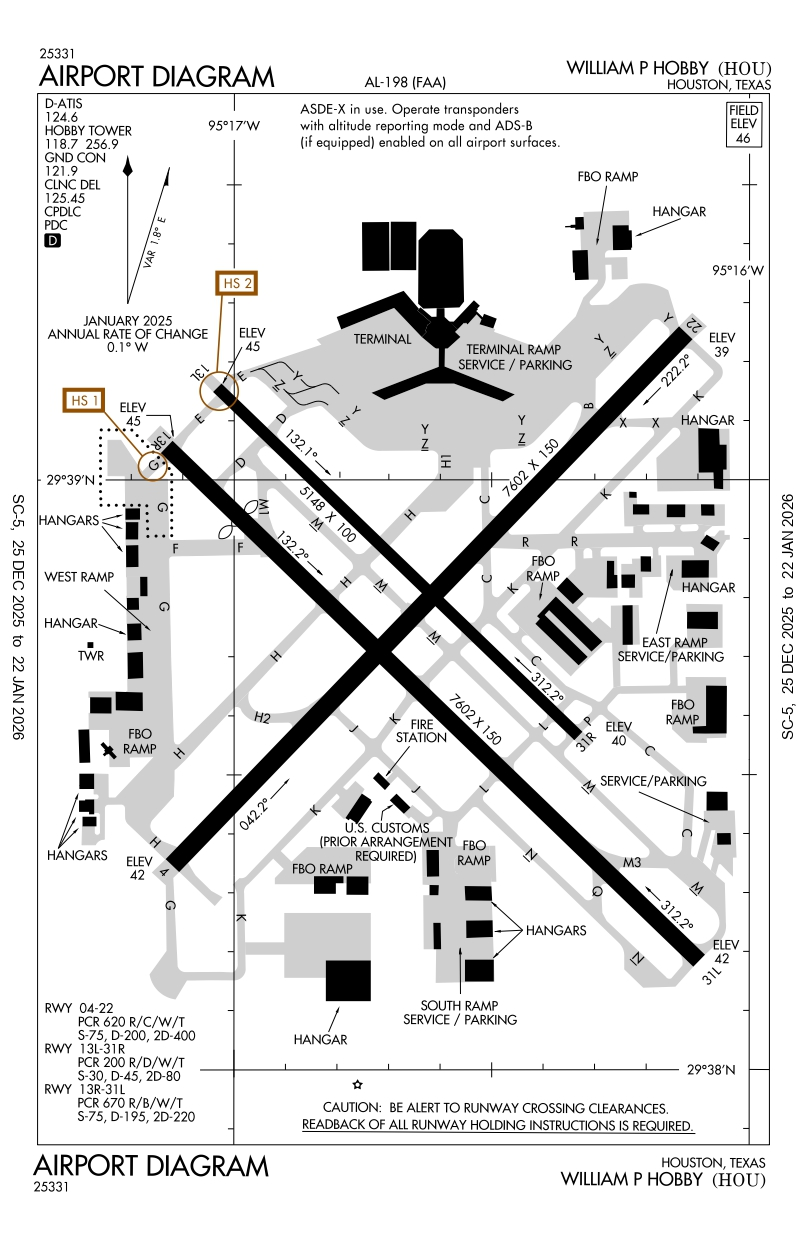
- FAA diagram as of 2026
- Interactive map of William P. Hobby Airport

Runways
Direction	Length		Surface
Direction	ft	m	Surface
04/22	7,602	2,317	Concrete
13L/31R	5,148	1,569	Concrete
13R/31L	7,602	2,317	Asphalt

Statistics (2025)
- Aircraft operations: 196,253
- Total Passengers: 13,943,759
- Source: Federal Aviation Administration

William P. Hobby Airport (IATA: HOU, ICAO: KHOU, FAA LID: HOU), colloquially referred to as Houston Hobby Airport, is an international airport in the Greater Hobby neighborhood in Houston, Texas, located approximately 7 miles (11 kilometres) from Houston city center. Hobby is Houston's oldest commercial airport, and was its primary airport until the Houston Intercontinental Airport, now known as the George Bush Intercontinental Airport, opened in 1969. Hobby was initially closed after the opening of Houston Intercontinental; however, it was re-opened after several years, and became a secondary airport for domestic airline service, and a center for corporate and private aviation.

Houston Hobby is an operating base for Southwest Airlines, which has international and domestic flights from HOU, and carries the vast majority of its passengers. As of December 2017, Houston Hobby is the fifth largest airport in Southwest's network. Southwest opened its first international terminal at Houston Hobby, and began service from Houston Hobby to Mexico and Central and South America on October 15, 2015.

The William P. Hobby Airport covers 1,304 acres (528 ha), and has three runways. Its original art deco terminal building, the first passenger airline terminal in Houston, now houses the 1940 Air Terminal Museum.

Hobby became the first 5-Star Airport in North America by Skytrax in 2022.

== History ==
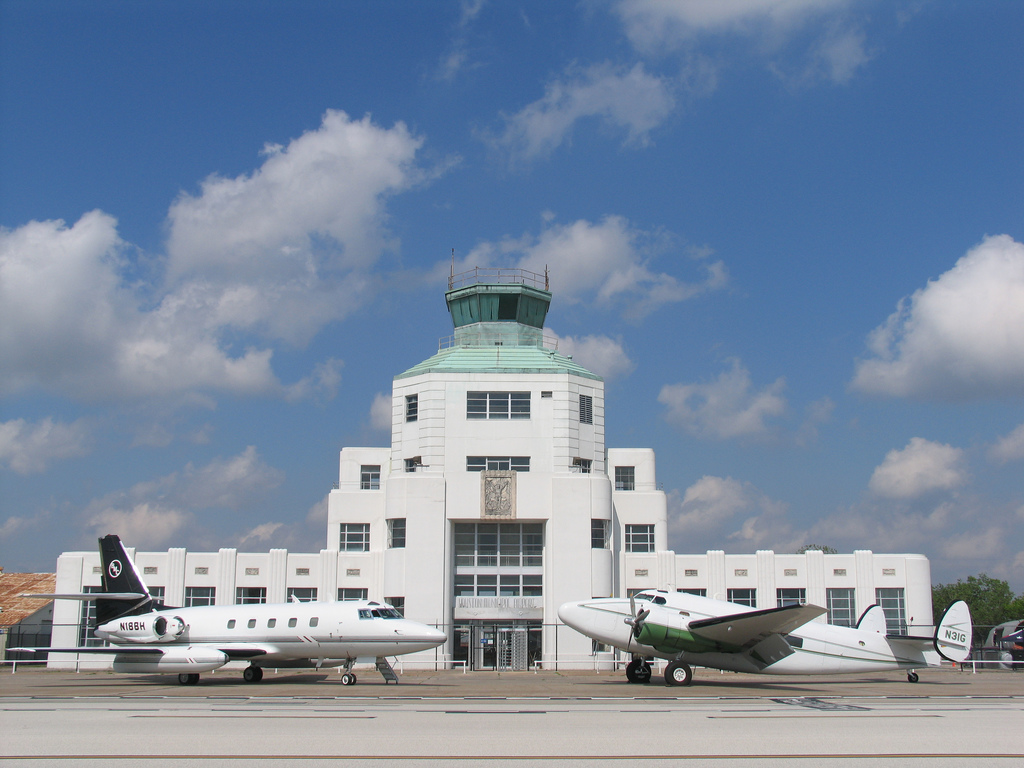
The 1940 Air Terminal Museum, originally an air terminal opened in 1940

Hobby Airport opened in June 1927 as a private landing field in a 600-acre (240 ha) pasture known as W.T. Carter Field. In the 1930s, it was served by Braniff International Airways and Eastern Air Lines. The site was acquired by the city of Houston and was named Houston Municipal Airport in 1937. The airport was renamed Howard R. Hughes Airport in 1938. Howard Hughes was responsible for several improvements to the airport, including its first control tower, built in 1938. The airport's name changed back to Houston Municipal because Hughes was still alive at the time and regulations did not allow federal improvement funds for an airport named after a living person.

The city of Houston opened a new air terminal and hangar in 1940.

=== Women Airforce Service Pilots (WASP) in 1943 ===
The first three Women Airforce Service Pilots (WASP) training classes were held at the Houston Municipal Airport in 1943.

=== Airlines in the 1940s and 1950s ===
In June 1948, Braniff International Airways began international flights from Houston operated with Douglas DC-4 and DC-6s to South America via Cuba and Panama. In the June 1948 timetable, the airline had two flights a week to Havana, Cuba – Panama City, Panama (via Balboa, Canal Zone) – Guayaquil, Ecuador – Lima, Peru, and a third flight that skipped Guayaquil. In 1949, Braniff flew direct via Lima to Rio de Janeiro, Brazil, and La Paz, Bolivia. In 1950, Pan American World Airways (Pan Am) began nonstop Douglas DC-4 service to Mexico City. On October 1, 1950, Chicago and Southern Air Lines began flying new Lockheed Constellations nonstop to St. Louis and direct to Chicago Midway Airport. Chicago & Southern flew nonstop to New Orleans, the sole purpose being to connect to the airline's daily Douglas DC-4 "Caribbean Comet" flights between New Orleans and Havana, Cuba; Kingston, Jamaica, and Caracas, Venezuela, as Chicago & Southern did not then have local traffic rights between Houston and New Orleans. In 1953, Chicago & Southern (C&S) was acquired by and merged into Delta Air Lines, giving Delta access to Houston for the first time. In 1954, Delta, operating as "Delta C&S", was flying a daily Convair 340 Houston – New Orleans – Havana, Cuba – Port au Prince, Haiti – Ciudad Trujillo (now Santo Domingo), Dominican Republic – San Juan, Puerto Rico. Also in 1954, an expanded terminal building opened to support the 53,640 airline flights that carried 910,047 passengers. The airport was renamed Houston International Airport the same year.

The April 1957 Official Airline Guide lists 26 weekday departures on Eastern, 20 on Braniff (plus four departures a week to/from South America), nine on Continental Airlines, nine on Delta Air Lines, nine on Trans-Texas Airways, four on National Airlines, two on Pan American World Airways and one on American Airlines. There were nonstops to New York City and Washington, D.C., but not to Chicago or Denver or anywhere west of Colorado. Later in 1957, KLM Royal Dutch Airlines started Douglas DC-7C flights to Amsterdam via Montreal. In 1958, Delta was operating daily nonstop Douglas DC-7s to New York City and weekly DC-7s direct to Caracas, Venezuela, via New Orleans (Delta called this latter service the "El Petrolero") while Eastern Douglas DC-7s and Lockheed Constellations flew nonstop to New York City.

=== The jet age arrives ===
Houston's first scheduled jets were Delta Douglas DC-8s nonstop to New York in December 1959 (Cearley says they began on December 1). Braniff International introduced Boeing 707s in April 1960, nonstop to Dallas Love Field and direct to Chicago O'Hare Airport; Braniff Lockheed L-188 Electra propjets flew nonstop to Chicago Midway Airport and Dallas Love Field, and direct to Denver, Minneapolis/St. Paul, Kansas City and Lubbock. In June 1960, Eastern Airlines Douglas DC-8s flew nonstop to New York City Idlewild Airport and to Atlanta, in addition to Lockheed L-188 Electras nonstop to Washington, D.C. National Airport with one-stop Electras to Newark. In July 1960, KLM introduced Douglas DC-8 flights to Amsterdam via Montreal before moving to Houston Intercontinental Airport (now George Bush Intercontinental Airport), where they remain today with nonstop Boeing 787 flights to Amsterdam. On May 15, 1960, Delta Air Lines operated the world's first Convair 880 scheduled passenger flight nonstop to New York City Idlewild Airport from Hobby. Delta would introduce Convair 880 flights nonstop to Chicago O'Hare Airport, St. Louis and New Orleans from Houston in addition to its service to New York City.

In June 1961, National Airlines Douglas DC-8s and Continental 707s began flying nonstop to Los Angeles, and National Electras flew nonstop to Las Vegas, San Diego and San Francisco. These were Houston's first nonstops beyond El Paso. In 1963, Continental Vickers Viscounts operated a "milk run" multi-stop service on a routing of Houston-Austin-San Angelo-Midland/Odessa-El Paso-Tucson-Phoenix-Los Angeles while Continental Viscounts also flew direct to Lubbock and Amarillo. In summer 1965, American Airlines only had one jet flight a day from Hobby, a Boeing 707 flying Houston-San Antonio-El Paso-Phoenix-Oakland-San Francisco. Eastern Boeing 727-100s flew nonstop to Washington D.C. Dulles Airport, New Orleans and Corpus Christi and direct to New York Newark Airport and Boston. Eastern Boeing 720s flew nonstop to New York JFK Airport, Atlanta, New Orleans and San Antonio and direct to Boston and Philadelphia. By 1966, Houston-based Trans-Texas Airways (TTa) had introduced Douglas DC-9-10s with nonstop flights to Dallas Love Field, Corpus Christi and Baton Rouge and direct to New Orleans. In 1966, Braniff was operating flights via interchange agreements with both Pan American World Airways (Pan Am) and United Airlines from Hobby. The service with Pan Am flew to London, England, and Frankfurt, Germany, daily with Boeing 707s via at Dallas Love Field and Chicago O'Hare Airport. The joint operation with United was flown with Boeing 720s twice daily Houston-Dallas-Denver-Seattle and Houston-Dallas-Denver-Portland, OR-Seattle. The same year, Braniff BAC One-Elevens flew nonstop to Dallas Love Field, Fort Worth (via Greater Southwest International Airport), Tulsa and Corpus Christi and direct to Chicago O'Hare Airport, Minneapolis/St. Paul, St. Louis and Wichita.

In 1967, the airport was renamed after a former Texas governor, William P. Hobby.

Besides the Braniff/Pan Am and KLM services to Europe, the airport had other long flights: Braniff was flying nonstop from Hobby to Panama City, Panama, with Boeing 707s and Boeing 720s in the late 1960s. Braniff's April 1969 timetable lists nonstop 707 service to Hawaii; however, Braniff flights from Houston to Hawaii did not actually start until September 1, after the move to IAH.

Houston Intercontinental Airport (IAH), now George Bush Intercontinental Airport, opened in June 1969; the airlines moved to Intercontinental and Hobby was left with no scheduled passenger service. The Civil Aeronautics Administration recommended years earlier that Houston plan to replace Hobby.

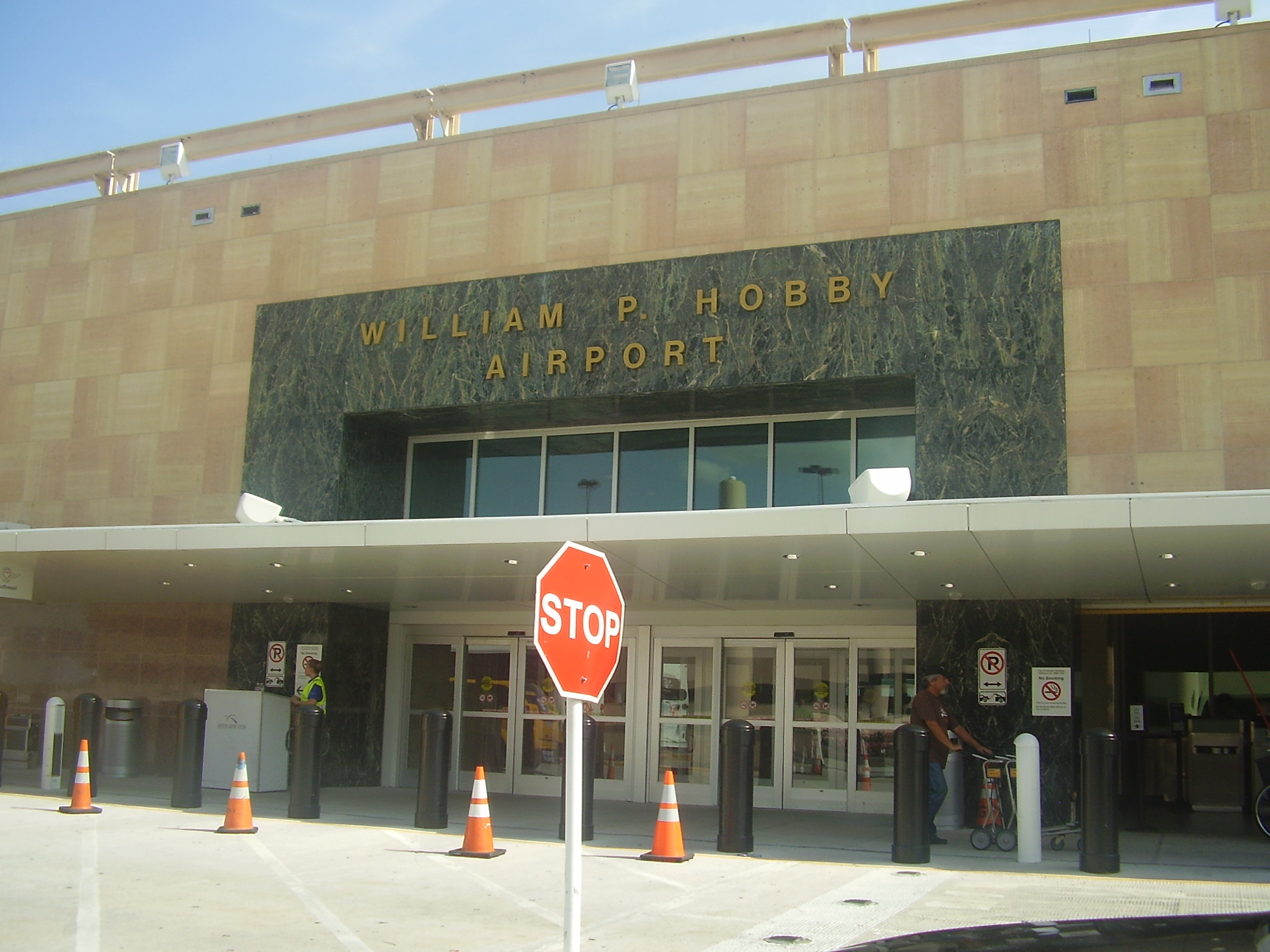
The Hobby Airport terminal

==== International service in the 1960s ====
Previously, KLM and Pan American World Airways (Pan Am) operated international flights from the International Building at Hobby until the late 1960s. In 1966, Pan Am was operating a daily Boeing 707 flight nonstop to Mexico City with continuing, no change of plane service to Guatemala City, Guatemala; San Salvador, El Salvador; Managua, Nicaragua; San José, Costa Rica; and Panama City, Panama. In 1969, both airlines moved to IAH and the International Building was demolished. Braniff International operated international service as well from the airport and in the spring of 1966 was operating nonstop Boeing 707 and Boeing 720 jet service twice a week to Panama City, Panama, with connections in Panama to other Braniff flights to South America. Also in 1966, Braniff was operating a joint international service via an interchange agreement with Pan Am to London, England, and Frankfurt, Germany, on a daily basis with Boeing 707 jetliners via intermediate stops at Dallas Love Field and Chicago O'Hare Airport. Aeronaves de Mexico (now Aeromexico) served Hobby as well with flights to Mexico and in the spring of 1968 was operating Douglas DC-9-10 jet service nonstop to Monterrey with continuing, no change of plane service several days a week to Guadalajara and Acapulco. Trans-Texas Airways also served Mexico and in 1968 was operating direct, no change of plane service from Hobby with Convair 600 turboprops eleven times a week to Monterrey and six times a week to Tampico and Veracruz via south Texas.

=== Resumption of airline service ===
The first airline to resume passenger flights was Houston Metro Airlines, a commuter airline, which in early 1970 was flying "cross town" service with de Havilland Canada DHC-6 Twin Otters between Hobby and Houston Intercontinental Airport (IAH) with 14 weekday round trips.

Jet airline service resumed on November 14, 1971, when Southwest Airlines operating as an intrastate airline began nonstop Boeing 737-200s to Dallas Love Field (DAL) and San Antonio (Southwest had initially launched service between Intercontinental Airport and Dallas Love Field before serving Hobby). Both Braniff International and Texas International resumed jet service into Hobby with nonstops to Dallas in competition with Southwest.

By fall 1979, Braniff and Texas International had ceased serving Hobby, however, two other jet airlines, Hughes Airwest and Ozark Air Lines, had joined Southwest at the airport, with Southwest operating Boeing 727-200s as well as 737-200s nonstop to Austin, Corpus Christi, Dallas Love Field, Harlingen, Lubbock, San Antonio and its first destination outside Texas, New Orleans. Hughes Airwest (owned by Howard Hughes) was flying nonstop to Las Vegas, Phoenix and Tucson and direct to Burbank (now Bob Hope Airport) and Orange County (now John Wayne Airport) while Ozark was flying nonstop to its hub in St. Louis; both airlines flew McDonnell Douglas DC-9-30s. Hughes Airwest was acquired by and merged into Republic Airlines which in 1983 had a focus city operation at Hobby with McDonnell Douglas DC-9-30s, DC-9-50s and MD-80s nonstop to Chicago O'Hare Airport (ORD), Dallas/Fort Worth (DFW), Detroit, Las Vegas, Memphis, New Orleans and Phoenix. By 1984, another airline flew nonstop Hobby to St. Louis: Air 1 Boeing 727-100s. A number of commuter airlines were flying from Hobby to smaller cities in Texas and Louisiana, including Chaparral Airlines, Commutair, Eagle Commuter, Hammonds Air Service, Metroplex Airlines and Tejas Airlines.

In 1987, Continental Airlines had a "dual hub" operation in Houston with a hub at Intercontinental Airport (IAH) and a second hub at Hobby. In February 1987, Continental had nonstops from Hobby to Austin, Denver, Las Vegas, Los Angeles, Miami, New Orleans, New York LaGuardia Airport, San Antonio and Washington D.C. National Airport. Nonstop "cross town" shuttle service was also being flown between HOU and IAH with Douglas DC-9-10s by Emerald Air operating as the "Houston Proud Express" or Continental with these flights using "CO" flight numbers with seven round trips a day. CO one-stops flew from Hobby to Bozeman, MT, Orlando, Sacramento and Tucson. Continental was operating up to 37 departures a day from HOU with Boeing 727-100s, 727-200s, 737-200s, 737-300s, Douglas DC-9-10s and McDonnell Douglas DC-9-30s. The airline shut down its hub at Hobby and was not serving the airport by the early 1990s although its regional affiliate Continental Express would return with "cross town" turboprop flights to IAH by the mid-1990s followed later by limited Continental mainline jet service. Also in 1987, Pan Am was once again serving Hobby with daily nonstop Boeing 727-200 and Boeing 737-200 service from the airport to Miami, New York JFK Airport and Washington Dulles Airport with the flight to New York continuing on a direct one stop, no change of plane basis to Bermuda.

In the fall of 1991, the OAG listed main line flights to Hobby on American Airlines, Delta Air Lines, Northwest Airlines, Trans World Airlines (TWA) and United Airlines in addition to Southwest. Other airlines jets at Hobby in the 1980s included Air Florida, Braniff, Eastern Air Lines, Emerald Air (operating independently and also on behalf of Continental Airlines as the aforementioned "Houston Proud Express" with DC-9s between HOU and IAH), the original Frontier Airlines, Muse Air, People Express, Republic Airlines and TranStar Airlines. Alaska Airlines also served Hobby in 1990 via an interchange agreement with American Airlines which enabled direct Boeing 727-200s to Anchorage and Fairbanks via Dallas/Ft. Worth and Seattle. At one point, Continental Airlines was operating Boeing 737-300s between Hobby and Houston Intercontinental and flying nonstop HOU to its Newark hub. In 2008 the airport handled 8.8 million passengers. Only domestic US destinations and international destinations with border preclearance were being served, but in fall 2015 Southwest opened a new international terminal allowing it to fly to foreign cities.

The headquarters for TranStar Airlines (formerly Muse Air before this new start up air carrier was acquired by Southwest Airlines) were at the airport. Muse Air followed by TranStar operated a hub at Hobby flying McDonnell Douglas MD-80s, DC-9-50s and DC-9-30s nonstop to Austin, Brownsville, Texas, Dallas Love Field, Las Vegas, Los Angeles (LAX), Lubbock, Ontario, California, McAllen, Texas, Miami, Midland/Odessa, New Orleans, Orlando, San Antonio, San Francisco, Tampa and Tulsa with direct service to San Diego and San Jose, California, at various times during the 1980s. Several other airlines were based at the airport in the past as well, including Pioneer Air Lines and Trans-Texas Airways (TTa) with the latter then changing its name to Texas International Airlines. Trans-Texas followed by Texas International operated a hub at the airport as well. Pioneer and Texas International merged with Continental Airlines, Pioneer in 1955 and Texas International in 1982. Continental continued to use the former Texas International maintenance base at Hobby after the merger.

=== 21st century ===
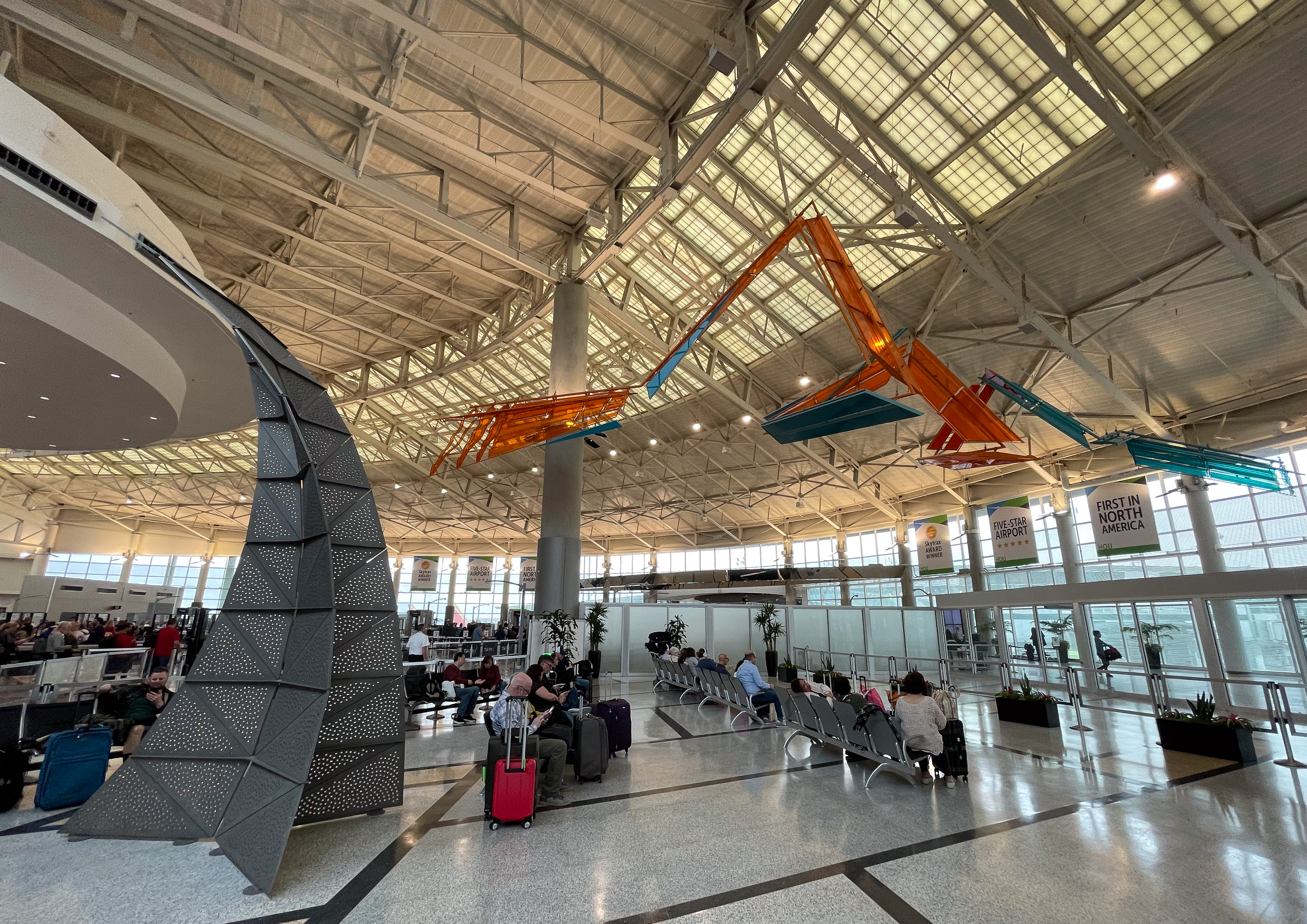
Interior of the airport terminal

In May 2011, Southwest Airlines expressed interest in initiating new international flights from Hobby.

On April 9, 2012, Houston Director of Aviation Mario Diaz announced support of international flights from Hobby after multiple studies of the economic impact on the entire city of Houston. On this day Southwest Airlines also debuted its new campaign, called Free Hobby. Supporters were asked to sign a petition. Southwest also started a website just for supporters of international flights from Hobby.

United Airlines, Houston's other major carrier, which would later be forced to compete with Southwest on proposed international routes, objected to the expansion plans, citing a study which concludes that the change would cost the Houston area jobs and result in a net reduction in GRP.

Houston Mayor Annise Parker backed Southwest's fight to make Hobby an international airport on May 23, 2012. On May 30, 2012, Houston's city council approved Southwest's request for international flights from Hobby. The groundbreaking of the terminal expansion began in September 2013. Five new gates (two arrival/departure gates and three arrival only gates) were added to accommodate both Boeing 737 and Airbus A320 family aircraft. The expansion was estimated to have cost $156 million and was paid for by Southwest Airlines. The expansion also included constructing a new parking garage as well as a re-organization and expansion of the security checkpoint and Southwest Airlines' check-in counter. Vertical construction was officially completed on October 15, 2015, and Southwest launched international flights that same day.

Frontier Airlines announced its return to the airport with direct flights to Cancun, Las Vegas, and Orlando starting in May 2022. Just two months later, Frontier Airlines announced a fourth flight from Hobby with a new Denver route starting in September, but Frontier exited HOU once again in 2025.

== Facilities ==
=== Terminal ===
William P. Hobby Airport has a single terminal with two concourses (Central and West) and 29 overall gates. The Central Concourse opened in 2003 and replaced the original three concourses as part of a $500 million expansion. The concourse expansion was opened on May 22, 2007. It has 24 gates (21 through 32 and 40 through 51) and serves Southwest domestic along with domestic non-Southwest flights and also includes an interfaith chapel. Two gates are allotted to American, one to Delta, and one for ULCC carriers; the rest are given to Southwest. The West Concourse opened on October 15, 2015, and is primarily used for international Southwest flights. It has five gates.

In February 2020, Hobby Airport became the first airport in Texas to have full biometric entry and exit for passengers who are traveling internationally.

In March 2022, Southwest announced a $250 million expansion project to add seven gates to Hobby's West Concourse. The city of Houston is contributing $20 million toward the project. Six of the gates will be used exclusively by Southwest for domestic flights. The seventh new gate will be available for use by other airlines at the discretion of the Houston Airport System. The project is expected to take five years. The project cost increased to $470 million when construction began in November 2024 with completion scheduled for 2027.

=== Other ===
There are several artistic pieces located in and on the William P. Hobby Airport grounds. Artists Paul Kittleson and Carter Ernst created Take-off, a stainless steel bird's nest showing interwoven branches created using industrial materials. The nest is 30 feet (9.1 m) wide and is held 20 feet (6.1 m) above the ground by three steel tree trunks. The nest is depicted floating above a subtropical garden. The artists created the work to depict the spirit of Houston's industrial force along the coastal plain. Take-off is located at Hobby's Broadway Street entrance.

The Houston Air Route Traffic Control Center serves as the airport's ARTCC.

== Airlines and destinations ==
=== Passenger ===
Airlines	Destinations
Allegiant Air	Provo, Gulf Shores; Seasonal: Asheville, Des Moines, Knoxville
American Eagle	Dallas/Fort Worth
Delta Air Lines	Atlanta
JSX	Dallas–Love
Southwest Airlines	Albuquerque, Atlanta, Austin, Baltimore, Belize City, Birmingham (AL), Cancún, Charleston (SC), Chicago–Midway, Colorado Springs, Columbus–Glenn, Corpus Christi, Dallas–Love, Denver, Destin/Fort Walton Beach, El Paso, Fort Lauderdale, Harlingen, Indianapolis, Jackson (MS), Jacksonville (FL), Kansas City, Las Vegas, Liberia (CR), Long Beach, Los Angeles, Louisville, Lubbock, Memphis, Miami, Midland/Odessa, Nashville, New Orleans, New York–LaGuardia, Oakland, Oklahoma City, Omaha, Ontario, Orlando, Panama City (FL), Pensacola, Phoenix–Sky Harbor, Pittsburgh, Puerto Vallarta, Raleigh/Durham, Sacramento, Salt Lake City, San Antonio, San Diego, San Jose (CA), San José (CR), San José del Cabo, San Juan, Savannah, St. Louis, Tampa, Tulsa, Washington–National; Seasonal: Amarillo, Charlotte, Little Rock, Montego Bay, Punta Cana, Myrtle Beach, Sarasota, Seattle/Tacoma, Tucson
Sun Country Airlines	Seasonal: Minneapolis/St. Paul

== Statistics ==
=== Annual traffic ===
HOU Airport Annual Passenger Traffic 2002–Present
Year	Passengers	% Change	Year	Passengers	% Change	Year	Passengers	% Change
2002	8,035,727	—	2012	10,437,648	▲6.0%	2022	13,113,877	▲16.0%
2003	7,803,330	▼2.9%	2013	11,109,449	▲6.4%	2023	13,908,466	▲6.1%
2004	8,290,559	▲6.2%	2014	11,947,924	▲7.5%	2024	14,612,605	▲5.1%
2005	8,257,506	▼0.4%	2015	12,164,429	▲1.8%	2025	13,943,759	▼4.6%
2006	8,548,955	▲3.5%	2016	12,909,443	▲6.1%	2026		
2007	8,819,521	▲3.2%	2017	13,435,672	▲4.1%	2027		
2008	8,775,798	▼0.5%	2018	14,476,469	▲7.7%	2028		
2009	8,498,441	▼3.2%	2019	14,455,307	▼0.1%	2029		
2010	9,054,001	▲6.5%	2020	6,479,576	▼55.2%	2030		
2011	9,843,302	▲8.7%	2021	11,307,392	▲74.5%	2031		

=== Top destinations ===
Busiest domestic routes from HOU (June 2025 – May 2026)
Rank	City	Passengers	Carriers
1	Dallas–Love, Texas	417,115	Southwest, JSX
2	Atlanta, Georgia	328,448	Southwest, Delta
3	Denver, Colorado	304,274	Southwest, Frontier
4	Las Vegas, Nevada	286,399	Southwest
5	Phoenix–Sky Harbor, Arizona	278,561	Southwest
6	Orlando, Florida	274,085	Southwest, Frontier
7	Chicago–Midway, Illinois	251,929	Southwest
8	Nashville, Tennessee	227,407	Southwest
9	New Orleans, Louisiana	218,583	Southwest
10	Baltimore, Maryland	203,331	Southwest

International routes from HOU, by ridership (June 2025 – May 2026)
Rank	City	Passengers	Carriers
1	Cancún, Mexico	264,360	Frontier, Southwest
2	San José del Cabo, Mexico	149,678	Southwest
3	San José—Santamaría, Costa Rica	103,813	Southwest
4	Liberia, Costa Rica	81,322	Southwest
5	Puerto Vallarta, Mexico	78,516	Southwest
6	Belize City—Goldson, Belize	75,489	Southwest
7	Montego Bay, Jamaica	21,979	Southwest
8	Punta Cana, Dominican Republic	48,015	Southwest

Largest Airlines at HOU (June 2025 – May 2026)
Rank	Airline	Passengers	Share
1	Southwest Airlines	12,701,421	94.6%
2	Delta Air Lines	314,367	2.3%
3	American Airlines	218,919	1.6%
4	Allegiant Air	77,430	0.6%
5	JSX (airline)	44,378	0.3%
	Other	71,390	0.5%

== Ground transportation ==
The Metropolitan Transit Authority of Harris County, Texas, or METRO, stops at Curb Zone 3 at the airport. Currently, there are four bus lines that serve Hobby Airport. 40 Telephone/Heights provides local service to Eastwood Transit Center, Downtown, and North Shepard Park and Ride. 50 Broadway also provides service between the airport and Eastwood Transit Center via the Magnolia Park Transit Center. 73 Bellfort, which runs up to a 12-minute frequency during weekday, runs between the airport and Fannin South Transit Center, connecting to the Metro Rail Red Line. 88 Sagemont runs between the airport and San Jacinto College South Campus.

Courtesy vans are operated by various hotels and motels in and around the Houston area. There are courtesy telephones in the baggage claim areas to request pickup for most hotels and motels.

Shared-ride shuttle service was available at HOU until 2019 when SuperShuttle (now Transdev) ceased business, citing competition from ride-sharing services Uber and Lyft. Additionally, regularly scheduled bus and shuttle service is provided by various carriers to locations from HOU to areas outside metropolitan Houston and to Galveston and College Station. These services can be found in the baggage claim area.

Taxis are available at Curb Zone 2. Lyft and Uber are available at Curb Zone 5.

== Accidents and incidents ==
- On January 18, 1988, a Hawker Siddeley HS-125-600B crashed during an Instrument Landing System approach to runway 04, hitting powerlines 6,500 ft (2,000 m) short of the runway; one crewmember of the eight on board was killed.
- On May 12, 2000, a private Beechcraft Baron 55 headed to Galliano, Louisiana, nosedived near the runways shortly after takeoff and subsequently burned. According to Houston Aviation Department spokesman Ernie DeSoto, the aircraft "apparently exploded on impact" and stalled at least twice. The plane climbed between 40 and 50 degrees rather than a safe 15 according to a pilot witness. The National Transportation Safety Board discovered that a gust-lock pin was inadvertently left in place, and it was also discovered by the Harris County medical examiner's office that the pilot suffered a heart attack. All six passengers on board the aircraft were killed.
- On November 22, 2004, a Gulfstream Aerospace Gulfstream III crashed 5 km (3.1 mi) west of Hobby, striking a light pole on approach and killing all three on board.
- On November 5, 2005, a Cessna 500 Citation I stalled and crashed after takeoff. Both occupants died.
- On June 9, 2016, a Cirrus SR20 stalled and crashed into a parking lot near the airport during a go-around. All three occupants died.
- On October 24, 2023, a Hawker 850XP took off from runway 22 without permission from air traffic control, and its wing clipped the tail of a Cessna Citation Mustang that had landed on intersecting runway 13R. The Hawker circled back and landed safely at the airport with only minor damage. The Cessna sustained substantial damage. The five occupants on board the Cessna and the three on board the Hawker were not injured.
- On May 3, 2024, an Embraer ERJ-145 of JSX, N942JX, operating as Flight 284 from Dallas Love Field, sustained a left main landing gear collapse during a low-speed rollout after a seemingly uneventful landing on runway 04. The airliner veered to the left side of the runway, dragging its left wing on the ground and sustaining substantial damage. One crew member sustained minor injuries; the other two crew and 21 passengers were not injured.

== See also ==
- List of airports in the United States
- List of international airports by country
