= OAG (company) =

Air travel information company

- Company type: Private company
- Available in: Multilingual
- Founded: 1929; 97 years ago
- Headquarters: Luton, England
- Area served: Europe, North America, Asia, Australasia and Latin America
- Key people: Filip Filipov, CEO
- Industry: Aviation, Travel, Technology
- Parent: Vitruvian Partners
- Website: oag.com
- Current status: Active

OAG is a global travel data provider with headquarters in the UK. The company was founded in 1929 and operates in the United States, Singapore, Japan, Lithuania and China. It has a large network of flight information data including schedules, flight status, connection times, and industry references such as airport codes.

== History ==
=== Early ===
The "Official Aviation Guide of the Airways" was first published in February 1929 in the United States, listing 35 airlines offering a total of 300 flights. After the Guide was taken over by a rival publication in 1948, the September issue carried the OAG title for the first time. OAG was founded in Chicago, but moved to the suburb of Oak Brook, Illinois, in 1968. The "ABC World Airways Guide" containing maps and tips for travellers was first published in the UK in 1946. The integration of the ABC and OAG brands occurred following the acquisition of OAG Inc. in 1993 by Reed Elsevier which already owned ABC International. OAG had acquired SRDS, an ad rate information company from Macmillan Inc., a sister Maxwell company, in 1992; Reed Elsevier sold SRDS to a buyout firm in 1994. In August 1996, all products from the combined ABC and OAG businesses were rebranded as OAG.

In 1958, advances in computer technology enabled flight schedules to be sorted and presented by city pair, instead of under separate sections for each airline timetable. This Quick Reference Edition initially included North American flights; starting in 1962 a separate International Quick Reference Edition covered the rest of the world. The two Timetable Editions continued in the traditional format for several more years; the last Worldwide Timetable Edition was in March 1969. In the late 1960s and early 1970s, the OAG Quick Reference Editions began integrating computer-generated connecting flight information and tariff data, both also arranged by city-pair and merged with the flight information.

In 1962, OAG began providing data to the first computer reservation systems and produced its first customised timetable for airlines. That year, it was acquired by Dun & Bradstreet. In 1970, OAG published its Pocket Flight Guide; it is still published today, in four regional versions. OAG participated in the development of the IATA Standard Schedules Information Manual (SSIM) for the interchange of airline schedules data. This was established in 1972 and is still the primary source of protocols and formats for the global airline industry. The OAG Electronic Edition was launched in 1983 and contained both flight and fare information. It was distributed through more than 20 system operators including Compuserve, Dow Jones and Viewtron. Additional databases (weather, arrival/departure information) were added in 1988. That year, Dun & Bradstreet sold OAG to Maxwell Communications. The company produced the industry's first PC-based travel planning tool on CD-ROM in 1991, which was bundled with a plug-in CD drive, as those were rare at the time. OAG launched an analytical tool in 1998, and also its first browser-based travel information product. The Swedish CAA became its first internet timetable customer and the following year Cathay Pacific became the first airline to give its Frequent Flyer Club members online access to OAG Travel Information System through its website. OAG made its flight information available on the Palm VII wireless organizer in 1999, followed a few months later by its first WAP mobile phone application.

=== Recent ===
Reed Elsevier sold OAG to Electra Private Equity in 2001. After five years under private ownership, OAG was bought by United Business Media in December 2006 to strengthen its aviation, transportation and travel business interests. UBM sold the majority of its data business to Electra Private Equity in 2013, who formed AXIO Data Group.

In 2009, OAG started to supply airlines schedules and Minimum Connection Time (MCTs) to Global distribution system Travelport and OAG also partners with the largest GDS in the world Amadeus and TravelSky.

In June 2010, OAG created new technology (Schedules Dynamic) to deliver the most up-to-date airline schedule changes to airlines, OTAs, GDSs and reservation systems.

OAG has a strategic partnership with IATA and contributes to its SSIM Standards Board and working groups.

In 2012, OAG launched OAG Analyser to deliver airline schedule analysis via an online accessible tool. In 2013, OAG added to its analytical suite with the launch of Traffic Analyser, a product developed in partnership with Travelport; a leading distribution services and e-commerce provider for the global travel industry.

In 2014, OAG acquired the services of real-time flight information solutions provider, Flight view, to expand its flight data business. November 2015 saw OAG sell MRO Network, a provider of aviation exhibitions, conferences and publications to the MRO, fleet, financing and leasing sectors to Penton (now part of the Aviation Week Network, owned by Informa).

In 2014, OAG began releasing its annual Punctuality League, which details the on-time performance of many of the world's largest airlines and airports. OAG also releases annual analysis on the world's busiest and most profitable routes and airports.

On 16 February 2017, OAG was bought by British investment firm Vitruvian Partners.

In September 2018, OAG opened a technology development centre in Kaunas, Lithuania.

In January 2020, OAG released its first data and analysis about the impact of COVID-19 on China and Asia with information on flights from Wuhan. OAG continues to release weekly analysis on the impact of the pandemic on the global aviation market. The recovery tracker details changes to global seat capacity annually, by region and by aircraft.
