= Mosaika Art & Design =

Mosaika Art & Design is a Canadian-based design and manufacturing company founded in 1998 by cofounders Kori Smyth and Saskia Siebrand. Mosaika specialises in the production and manufacturing of mosaics.

== Public Art Commissions (United States) ==
- San Francisco Airport, (San Francisco, CA) Artist: Amy Ellingson (2015)

- San Francisco General Hospital, (San Francisco, CA) Artist: Rupert Garcia (2015)

- Mother Clara Hale Bus Depot, (Harlem, NYC). Artist: Shinique Smith (2013)

- Dallas Love Field Airport, (Dallas, TX). Artist: Dixie Friend Gay (2013)

- Smith and Ninth Subway Station, (Brooklyn, NYC). Artist: Alyson Shotz (2013)

- Sam Houston State University, (Woodlands, Texas). Artist: Dixie Friend Gay (2012)

- Fort Worth Water Waste Treatment Center, (Fort Worth, Texas). Artist: Julie Lazarus (2012)

- University of Michigan, Case Hall, East Lansing (Ann Arbor, Michigan). Artist: Anne Marie Karlsen (2012)

- World Food Prize Headquarters, (Des Moines, Iowa). Artist: Kinuko Y. Craft (2011)

- LACMTA Expo Line – Jefferson/USC (Los Angeles Metro station) (Los Angeles, CA). Artist: Samuel Rodriguez (2011)

- LACMTA Expo Line – Vermont/Expo (Los Angeles Metro station) (Los Angeles, CA). Artist: Jessica Polzin McCoy (2011)

- LACMTA Expo Line – Western/Expo (Los Angeles Metro station) (Los Angeles, CA). Artist: Ronald J. Llanos. (2011)

- LACMTA Expo Line – La Cienega/Jefferson (Los Angeles Metro station) (Los Angeles, CA). Artist: Daniel Gonzalez (2011)

- Kinzie West Building (Chicago, IL). Artist: Lynn Basa (2011)

- Gateway to the Health Sciences Secondary School (Queens, NY). Artist: Sarah Morris (2010)

- The Woodlands (The Woodlands, TX). Artist: Dixie Friend Gay. (2010)

- A & M University (Galveston, TX). Artist: Dixie Friend Gay. (2010)

- LACMTA – Westlake McArthur Park Station (Los Angeles, CA). Artist: Sonia Romero. (2009)

- Laguna Honda Hospital and Rehabilitation Center (San Francisco, CA). Artist: Owen Smith (2009)

- LACMTA – Civic Centre Station (Los Angeles, CA). Artist: Faith Ringgold (2009)

- The Villages at Santa Fe Springs (Santa Fe Springs, CA). Artist: Lynn Goodpasture. (2009)

- New York MTA - Valley Stream Station (New York, NY). Artist: Malin Abrahamsson (2008)

- City of Glendale Downtown Parking Structure (Glendale, AZ). Artist: Lynn Basa. (2008)

- Chevron Headquarters – (Covington, LA). Artist: Dixie Friend Gay. (2008)

- Early Childhood Center, District 24 (Queens, NY). Artist: Alex Sax (2008)

- New York MTA – Myrtle-Wyckoff Subway Station (New York, NY). Artist: Cadence Giersbach. (2007)

- Sun Valley Health Center (Sun Valley, CA). Artist: Terry Braunstein. (2007)

- Claremont Redevelopment (Claremont Village, CA). Artist: Lynn Basa. (2007)

- The Sienna Building (Montclair, NJ). Artist: Cadence Giersbach. (2006)

- Village of Key Biscayne (Key Biscayne, FL). Artist: Sarah Morris. (2006)

- New York MTA - 191st Street Station (New York, NY). Artist: Raul Cohen. (2003)

== Public Art Commissions (Canada) ==
- McGill University Health Center, (Montreal, QC) Artist: Shelley Miller (2014)

- AMT Gare-St Michel- Montreal Nord, (Montreal, QC) Artist: Shelley Miller (2014)

- Trump International Hotel and Tower (Toronto) Ontario. Artist: Stephen Andrews (Artist) (2011)

- Centre d’accueil Marcelle-Ferron (Brossard, QC). Artist: Shelley Miller (2011)

- Centre des Carrieres Western Quebec (Aylmer, QC). Artist: Pierre Blanchette. (2009)

- Cathedrale Notre-Dame de l'Assomption (Moncton), NB. Artist: Claude Roussel. (2006)

- Societe de transport de Montreal – Metro Station Place des arts (Montreal, QC). Artist: Saskia Siebrand. (2005)

- Gelber Conference Centre, CJA (Montreal, QC). Artist: Devora Neumark. (1999)

== United Arab Emirates ==
- Dubai Development Board (Dubai, UAE). Artist: Saskia Siebrand. (2003)
