= David Hornik =

American venture capitalist and philanthropist

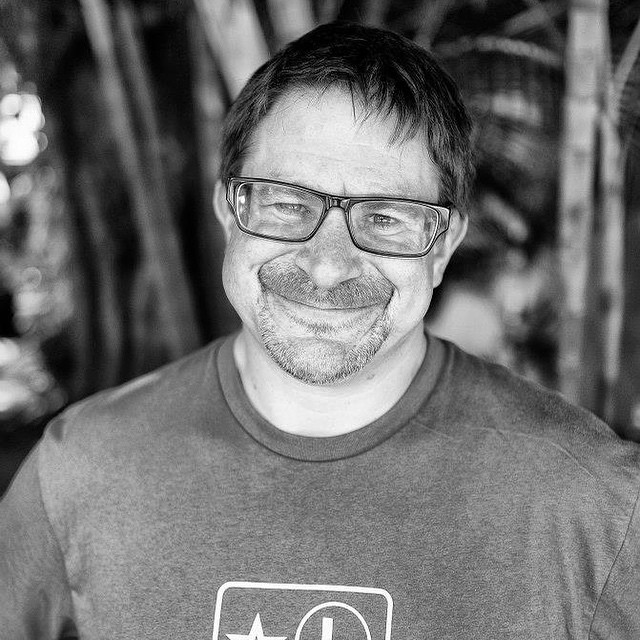
- Hornik in 2014
- Born: United States
- Education: Stanford University, University of Cambridge, Harvard Law School
- Occupations: Venture capitalist, lawyer, educator, art collector, philanthropist
- Spouse: Pamela Miller
- Children: 4

David Martin Hornik is an American venture capitalist, lawyer, educator, art collector, and philanthropist. He is a founding partner at Lobby Capital, a Silicon Valley–based firm. Prior to founding Lobby Capital, Hornik was a general partner at August Capital for 20 years.

== Early life and education ==
David Hornik grew up in New Hampshire and Massachusetts, his father was a computer scientist. Hornik claims he is dyslexic, which has been the topic of his 2012 TED talk. Hornik holds an AB degree (1990) in Computer Music from Stanford University; an M.Phil in Criminology from Cambridge University; and a JD (1994) from Harvard Law School.

He is married to Pamela (née Miller). Together they have four children, including composer and musician Julian Hornik.

== Career ==
After passing the bar exam, he worked as a public defender in his early career. He later worked at the offices of Cravath, Swaine & Moore in New York City; followed by work at the Venture Law Group. In 1997, the family moved from New York City to the San Francisco Bay Area in order to work as an attorney representing startups at Perkins Coie (in their San Francisco Bay Area offices).

In 2000, he joined August Capital, where he was named partner in 2005; and he remained there for 20 years. Hornik has invested in a wide range of technology companies, including Splunk, GitLab, WePay, Bill.com, Fastly, Evite. His investing stories have been featured in American author Adam Grant's New York Times Bestseller, Give and Take: A Revolutionary Approach to Success. In 2012, he was named on the Forbes magazine's Midas List. In 2013, Deloitte named Hornik the "Silicon Valley Venture Capitalist Of The Year".

In addition to his investing career, Hornik teaches entrepreneurship at Harvard Law School, and business management at Stanford Graduate School of Business. Since June 2014, Hornik serves on the Board of GLAAD (Gay & Lesbian Alliance Against Defamation).

== Philanthropy and art collection ==
His first collection was started while Hornik was in college, international editions of Alice in Wonderland books. David and Pamela are collectors of contemporary art which includes work by artists Chuck Close, Joan Brown, Alex Katz, Andy Warhol, Amir Fallah, Robert Mapplethorpe, Cindy Sherman, Jordan Casteel, and Hope Gangloff.

In 2021, the Hornik's helped fund the opening of the Institute of Contemporary Art San Francisco (ICA SF) in the Dogpatch neighborhood, alongside funds from Deborah and Andy Rappaport; and Kaitlyn and Mike Krieger.
