= Amy Ellingson =

American contemporary abstract painter

Amy Ellingson (born 1964) is an American contemporary abstract painter. She is a native of the San Francisco Bay Area and currently lives and works in Santa Fe, New Mexico.

== Education ==
Ellingson received a BA in Studio Art from Scripps College and an MFA from CalArts.

== Career ==
From 2000 to 2011, Ellingson taught at the San Francisco Art Institute, attaining the rank of associate professor. Since 2011 she has served on the board of directors at Root Division, a visual arts non-profit in San Francisco. She lectured on the artwork of hard-edge abstract painter Frederick Hammersley at the New Mexico Museum of Art in relation to her own work, highlighting the use of “formal repetition, variation, and mutation within a system.”

== Artwork ==
Ellingson's work has been contextualized within the lineage of Cubism, by depicting multiple views of objects in one composition, and Abstract Expressionism, specifically related to the “environments” created by other AbEx artists such as Franz Kline, Joan Mitchell, and Morris Louis.

The “transperceptual space” depicted in her works through striations, symmetry, glyphs, and other visual systems can be seen as a source of allusive meaning in abstract art, similar to the spaces created in “biomorphic” and “action painting” of earlier AbEx artists like Jackson Pollock. Her work has also been considered within the realms of Pop art and Op art in terms of visual phenomena and neural impulses, and has been compared to the recombining, shapeshifting work of artist Jay DeFeo.

Ellingson uses the computer to create interrelated layers of repeating geometric forms which she replicates in increasing complexity using oil and encaustic paint; this “translation between the virtual and the real is paramount” for the artist. Her compositions are informed by the juxtaposition of opposites, such as the lightning speed of working digitally compared to the painstaking craft of layering paint by hand. She has explained that her goal is to “create works that address the intersection of abstract painting and contemporary virtual experience.” Additionally, her paintings have been recognized as part of a shared contemporary investigation of the potential illusory depth of the picture plane compared to the flatness common in historical abstract works.

The artist's most notable artworks include her 2015 public commission Untitled (Large Variation), an 1100 square-foot mural commissioned by the San Francisco International Airport (SFO) and the San Francisco Arts Commission. The piece covers a slightly curved wall with 60 different colors of tile and seven shades of grout, was made in collaboration with Montreal mosaic fabricators Mosaika, and is installed in SFO's expanded Terminal 3.

== Selected exhibitions ==
Ellingson's work has been shown throughout the United States and in Tokyo.

Her solo exhibitions include Amy Ellingson: Chopping Wood on the Astral Plane at Minnesota Street Project (October 1–29, 2016) and Iterations & Assertions at the San Jose Institute of Contemporary Art (June 7–September 13, 2014). The exhibition is an example of how Ellingson can stretch herself and her work in terms of ambitious conception and production.

Recent group exhibitions include Open Ended: Painting and Sculpture Since 1900 at the San Francisco Museum of Modern Art (Jan 1, 2018 through Jun 30, 2022) and Unfamiliar Again: Contemporary Women Abstractionists at the Newcomb Art Museum of Tulane University (August 24 – December 23, 2017).

== Awards and public collections ==
She is the recipient of the Fleishhacker Foundation Eureka Fellowship and the Artadia Grant to Individual Artists and has been awarded fellowships at the MacDowell Colony, the Ucross Foundation, and the Civitella Ranieri Foundation. Her work is held in various public and corporate collections including the San Francisco Museum of Modern Art, the Crocker Art Museum, the San Jose Museum of Art, the Oakland Museum of California, the Berkeley Art Museum, and the Achenbach Foundation for Graphic Arts.
