= George Bush Intercontinental Airport =

Main airport serving Houston, Texas, United States

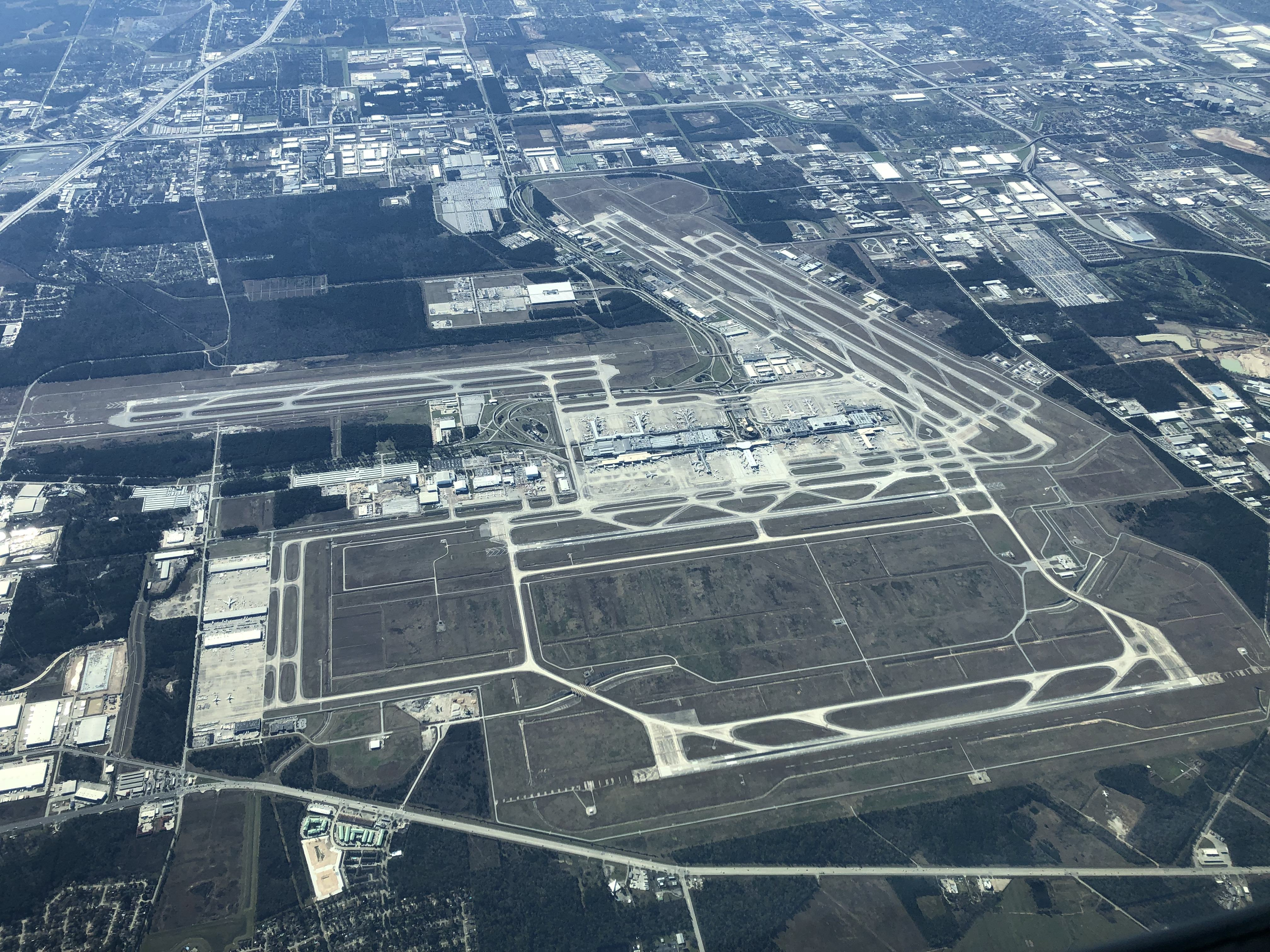
- IAH Airport aerial view in January 2019.
- IATA: IAH; ICAO: KIAH; FAA LID: IAH; WMO: 72243

Summary
- Airport type: Public
- Owner/Operator: Houston Airport System
- Serves: Greater Houston
- Location: Houston, Texas, U.S.
- Opened: June 8, 1969; 57 years ago
- Hub for: United Airlines
- Time zone: CST (UTC−06:00)
  - Summer (DST): CDT (UTC−05:00)
- Elevation AMSL: 30 m (98 ft)
- Coordinates: 29°59′04″N 095°20′29″W
- Website: www.fly2houston.com/iah

Maps
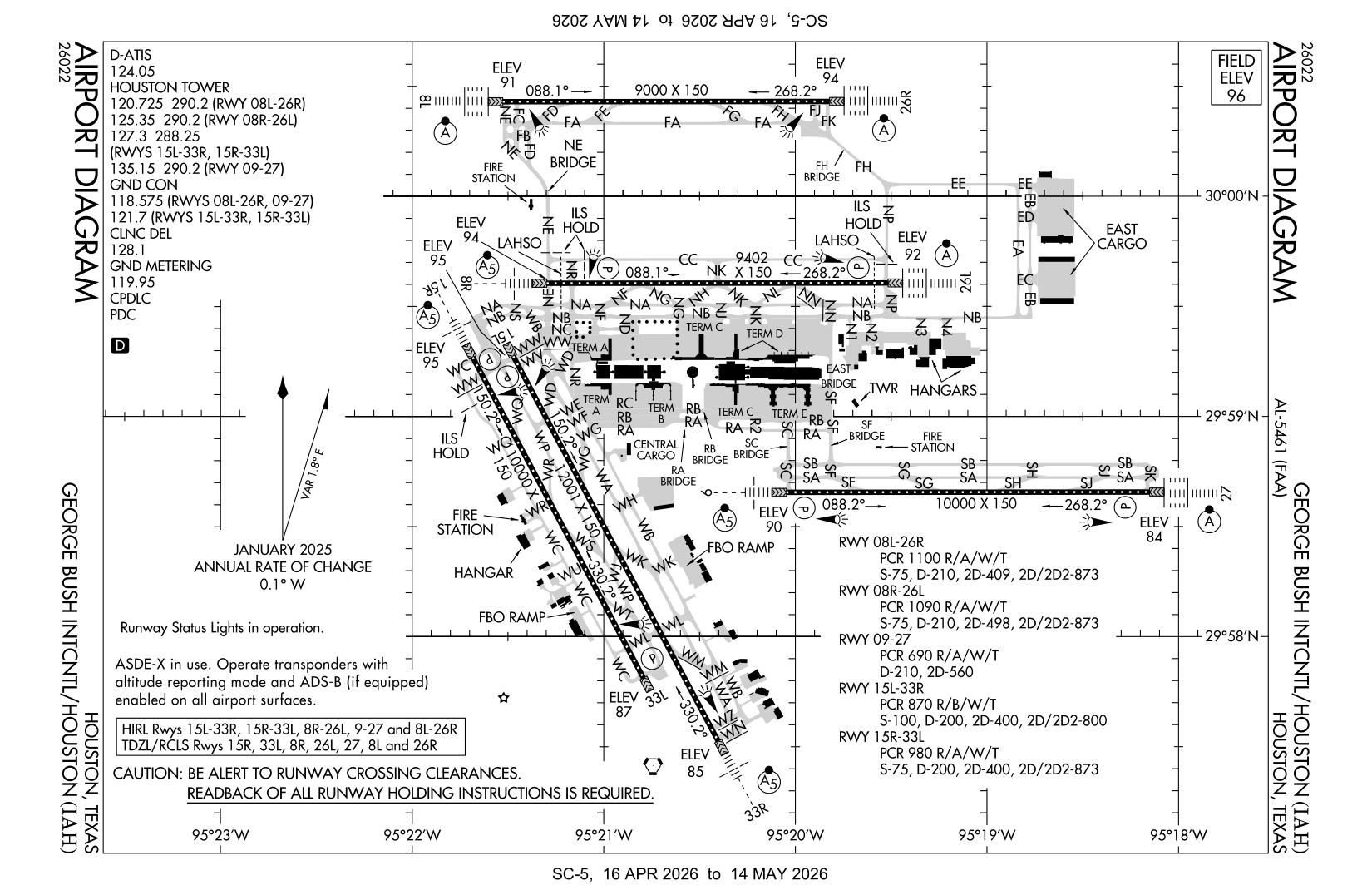
- FAA airport diagram
- Interactive map of George Bush Intercontinental Airport

Runways
Direction	Length		Surface
Direction	m	ft	Surface
15L/33R	3,658	12,001	Concrete
15R/33L	3,048	10,000	Concrete
9/27	3,048	10,000	Concrete
8L/26R	2,743	9,000	Concrete
8R/26L	2,866	9,402	Concrete

Statistics (2025)
- Passengers: 48,131,213
- Aircraft operations: 457,843
- Sources: Fly2Houston.com and Federal Aviation Administration

George Bush Intercontinental Airport (IATA: IAH, ICAO: KIAH, FAA LID: IAH) is the main international airport in Houston, Texas, United States, serving the Greater Houston metropolitan area. Initially named Houston Intercontinental Airport upon its opening in 1969, it was renamed in honor of George H. W. Bush, the 41st president of the United States and a resident of Houston, in 1997. It is also commonly called Houston International Airport or George Bush International Airport.

Located about 23 miles (37 km) north of Downtown Houston between Interstate 45 and Interstate 69/U.S. Highway 59 with direct access to the Hardy Toll Road expressway, George Bush Intercontinental Airport has scheduled flights to a large number of domestic and international destinations covering five continents. It is the second busiest airport in Texas for international passenger traffic as of 2025, behind Dallas Fort Worth International Airport, and has a number of international destinations, the second-busiest airport in Texas as of 2021 and the 15th busiest in the United States for total passenger traffic as of 2022.

IAH covers 10,000 acres (40 km^{2}) of land and has five runways. Houston Intercontinental is one of the largest passenger hubs for United Airlines and formerly also served as a hub for one of United Airlines' predecessors, Continental Airlines, as well as defunct airlines Eastern Air Lines and Texas International Airlines.

== History ==
=== 20th century ===
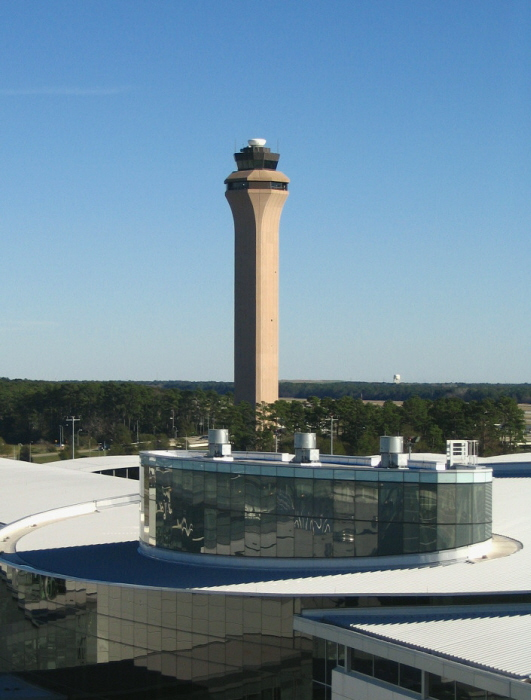
George Bush Intercontinental Airport's air traffic control tower in December 2006

A group of Houston businessmen purchased the site for Bush Intercontinental Airport in 1957 to preserve it until the city of Houston could formulate a plan for a new airport as a replacement for William P. Hobby Airport (at the time known as Houston International Airport). The holding company for the land was named the Jet Era Ranch Corporation, but a typographical error transformed the words "Jet Era" into "Jetero" and the airport site subsequently became known as the Jetero airport site. Although the name Jetero was no longer used in official planning documents after 1961, the airport's eastern entrance was named Jetero Boulevard. Most of Jetero Boulevard was later renamed Will Clayton Parkway.

The City of Houston annexed the Intercontinental Airport area in 1965. This annexation, along with the 1965 annexations of the Bayport area, the Fondren Road area, and an area west of Sharpstown, resulted in a gain of 51,251 acres (20,741 ha) of land for the city.

Houston Intercontinental Airport, which was the original name for the airport, opened in June 1969. The airport's IATA code of IAH derived from the stylization of the airport's name as "Intercontinental Airport of Houston." All scheduled passenger airline service formerly operated from William P. Hobby Airport moved to Intercontinental upon the airport's completion. Hobby remained open as a general aviation airport and was once again used for scheduled passenger airline jet service two years later when Southwest Airlines initiated intrastate airline service nonstop between Hobby and Dallas Love Field in 1971.

In the late 1980s, Houston City Council considered a plan to rename the airport after Mickey Leland—an African-American U.S. Congressman who died in an aviation accident in Ethiopia. Instead of renaming the whole airport, the city named Mickey Leland International Arrivals Building, which would later become Mickey Leland Terminal D, after the congressman. In April 1997, Houston City Council unanimously voted to rename the airport George Bush Intercontinental Airport/Houston, after George H. W. Bush, the 41st president of the United States. The name change took effect on May 2, 1997.

On August 28, 1990, Continental Airlines agreed to build its maintenance center at George Bush Intercontinental Airport; Continental agreed to do so because the city of Houston agreed to provide city-owned land near the airport.

At the time of the opening of IAH in 1969, domestic scheduled passenger airline flights were being operated by American Airlines, Braniff International Airways, Continental Airlines, Delta Air Lines, Eastern Air Lines, National Airlines and Houston-based Texas International Airlines, which had formerly operated as Trans-Texas Airways. International flights at this time were being flown by Pan American World Airways with ten nonstop flights a week operated with Boeing 707 jetliners to Mexico City; KLM Royal Dutch Airlines operating Douglas DC-8 jets four days a week to Amsterdam via an intermediate stop in Montreal; Braniff International with Boeing 727 services several times a week to Panama City, Panama; and Aeronaves de Mexico (now Aeroméxico) flying Douglas DC-9 jets to Monterrey, Guadalajara, Puerto Vallarta, Acapulco and Mexico City several days a week. Texas International was also operating direct services to Mexico at this time with Douglas DC-9 jets to Monterrey and Convair 600 turboprop flights to Tampico and Veracruz.

KLM introduced Boeing 747 services in 1971 and by 1974 Air France was operating four nonstop Boeing 747 flights a week to both Paris and Mexico City. Also in 1974, Continental and National were operating McDonnell Douglas DC-10 wide body jetliners into IAH while Delta was flying Lockheed L-1011 TriStar wide body jets with both types being operated on respective domestic routes from the airport by these airlines; with National also operating Boeing 747s on a Miami–Houston–Los Angeles routing.

By the late 1970s, Cayman Airways had begun nonstop flights between Grand Cayman in the Caribbean and Intercontinental with BAC One-Eleven jets. Cayman Airways served the airport for many years, operating a variety of aircraft including Boeing 727-200, Boeing 737-200, Boeing 737-300, Boeing 737-400 and Douglas DC-8 jetliners into IAH in addition to the BAC One-Eleven. In 1977, British Caledonian, commenced nonstop flights between London's Gatwick Airport and Houston with Boeing 707 service, and later with DC-10 and Boeing 747-200 service. British Airways continued operating the route, when in December 1987, BA took over B-Cal increasing its frequency on the route to double-daily.

By July 1983, the number of domestic and international air carriers serving Intercontinental had grown substantially. American, Continental, Delta and Eastern had been joined by Piedmont Airlines, Southwest Airlines, TWA, United Airlines, USAir and Western Airlines. Western was operating daily McDonnell Douglas DC-10 wide body jet services nonstop to Salt Lake City at this time, with this flight also offering one-stop services to Anchorage, Alaska. International services were being operated by Air Canada, Aviateca, British Caledonian Airways, Continental Airlines, Eastern Air Lines, SAHSA, South African Airways, TACA, TWA and Viasa in addition to Pan Am, KLM, Air France, Aeroméxico and Cayman Airways. Several commuter and regional airlines were also operating passenger services at this time from IAH including Emerald Air (operating as Pan Am Express), Metro Airlines, Rio Airways and Royale Airlines. Metro Airlines was operating "cross-town" shuttle services with de Havilland Canada DHC-6 Twin Otter turboprops with up to seventeen round trip flights a day between IAH and the Clear Lake City STOLport located near the NASA Johnson Space Center and also up to nine round trip flights a day between the airport and Sugar Land Regional Airport as well as other flights to regional destinations in Texas and Louisiana. In addition, at this same time the airport had scheduled helicopter airline services operated by Executive Helicopters with Bell 206L LongRanger helicopters to four Houston-area heliports with up to 36 round trip flights a day.

=== 21st century ===
In 2002, runway 15R-33L was extended from 6,308 ft. to 10,000 ft. and widened. It holds the distinction as the world's first lime/cement/fly ash crushed concrete stabilized base (LCF) used under a portland cement concrete (PCC) surface.

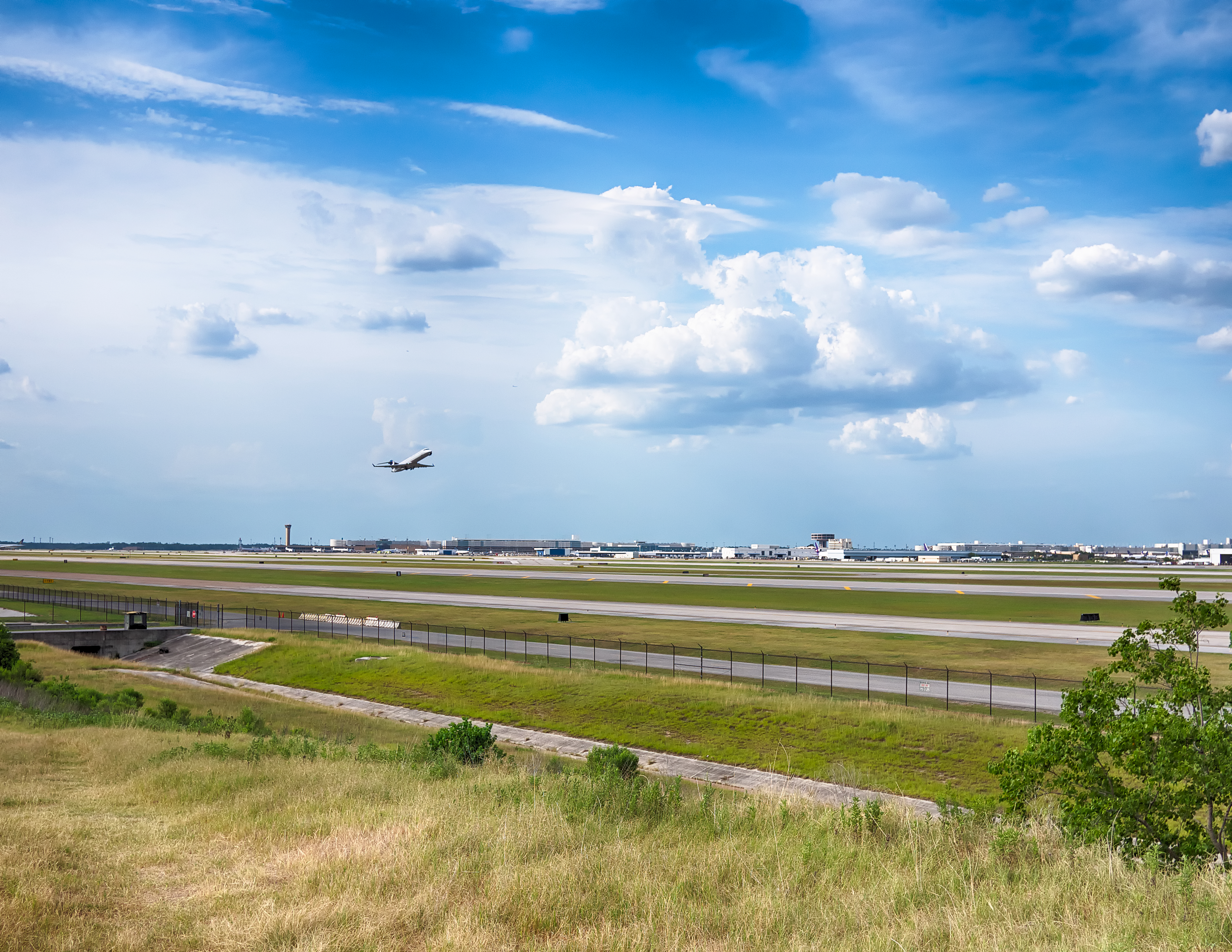
Runways 33L and 33R at George Bush International Airport

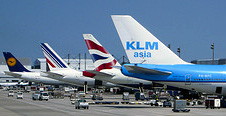
A typical lineup at Terminal D with Lufthansa, Air France, British Airways, and KLM aircraft

Since Houston was not an approved gateway for U.S. to London Heathrow flights under the Bermuda II Agreement, Continental Airlines, and British Airways flew their London services to London Gatwick. British Airways, keen to allow its passengers access to connections at its larger Heathrow Airport hub, subsequently flew various routings from Houston to Heathrow, via a gateway approved technical stop, allowing its Houston originating flights to land at Heathrow. While keeping a daily Houston–Gatwick flight, British Airways operated a flight from Houston to Heathrow via Washington-Dulles, with the technical stop being later changed to Chicago-O'Hare and finally to Detroit. In March 2008, the Bermuda II agreement was replaced with the EU–US Open Skies Agreement, allowing Continental Airlines and British Airways to switch its London services from Houston to Heathrow Airport that summer. Gate BA presently operates double-daily flights to London's Heathrow Airport with Boeing 777 and Boeing 787 service.

As of 2007, Terminal B remained from the airport's original design. Lewis W. Cutrer Terminal C opened in 1981, the Mickey Leland International Arrivals Building (now called Terminal D) opened in May 1990, and the new Terminal E partially opened on June 3, 2003. The rest of Terminal E opened on January 7, 2004. Terminal D is the arrival point for all international flights except for United flights, which use Terminal E. Flights from Canada on Air Canada and WestJet arrive in terminal A. Terminal D also held customs and INS until the opening of the new Federal Inspection Service (FIS) building, completed on January 25, 2005.

On January 7, 2009, a Continental Airlines Boeing 737-800 departing Bush Intercontinental was the first U.S. commercial jet to fly on a mix of conventional jet fuel and biofuel.

In December 2009, the Houston City Council approved a plan to allow Midway Cos. to develop 10 acres (4.0 ha) of land owned by Houston Airport System (HAS) on the grounds of Bush Airport. Midway planned to develop a travel center for the airport's rental car facility. The city dictated the developer needed to place a convenience store and gas station facility, a flight information board, a fast casual restaurant, and a sit-down restaurant in the development. Beyond the required buildings, the developer planned to add an office facility of between 20,000 and 40,000 square feet (1,900 and 3,700 m^{2}) and additional retail space.

In 2011, United Airlines began Boeing 777-200ER services to Lagos, Nigeria; this was the airport's first nonstop flight to Africa. In May 2016, United ended the Houston–Lagos service, citing the inability to repatriate revenue sold locally in Nigerian currency after the Nigerian government restricted currency transfers out of the country. South African Airways previously operated nonstop Boeing 747SP services in 1983 between Houston and Amilcar Cabral International Airport in the Cape Verde islands off the coast of Africa as a refueling stop for its flights between Houston and Johannesburg, South Africa. Continental was also planning to commence nonstop Boeing 787 services to Auckland in New Zealand but these plans were canceled as a reaction to new international flights at Hobby Airport announced by Southwest Airlines. United — which acquired Continental and had fully integrated it into the United brand by early 2012 — had postponed the introduction of this service owing to delays associated with the Boeing 787 Dreamliner. Its 787s were put to use on other international routes, however, including Houston–London and United's then-new Houston–Lagos nonstop flights. The Houston–Auckland nonstop route was then begun by Air New Zealand using a Boeing 777-200ER. In 2014, United added a second daily flight to Tokyo and new routes to Munich, Germany; Santiago, Chile; and Punta Cana, Dominican Republic, and it restarted the Aruba route, which had been canceled in 2012.

In August 2012, Lufthansa switched its daily Houston–Frankfurt route to an Airbus A380 from a Boeing 747-400, making Houston the first airport in Texas to receive A380 service. In addition, Lufthansa has also operated the Boeing 747-8 on the route. As of 2026, Dubai-based carrier Emirates also operates the A380 on the Dubai-Houston route.

IAH became the first airport in North America to have nonstop flights to every inhabited continent in 2017, with the addition of Air New Zealand, but lost this claim when Atlas Air ended its nonstop flight to Luanda. The airport regained this status in December 2019 when Ethiopian Airlines launched service to Lomé in Togo and Addis Ababa in Ethiopia. It has since lost this status again.

On September 7, 2017, United announced the launch of flights from Houston to Sydney, using a 787-9. The Houston–Sydney service, at 8,596 miles (13,834 km), is currently United's longest nonstop route. Additionally, it surpassed Emirates' Dubai route as the longest flight at IAH. As of April 2026, Houston to Sydney is the longest nonstop route on any US airline, and the 11th longest passenger flight in the world.

In January 2019, Ethiopian Airlines became the latest international carrier to announce new service, three-times weekly, to Addis Ababa. The route will be Addis Ababa–Lome–Houston, and the airline is replacing its Los Angeles gateway for Houston. The route will be serviced using the Boeing 787 Dreamliner and will be the city's only gateway to Africa after service to Lagos, Nigeria, was canceled by United Airlines. Service was supposed to begin in June 2019, but was delayed until December 2019. Service began on December 16, 2019. Ethiopian Airlines has since discontinued the route, leaving Houston without any nonstop options to Africa.

In October 2020, Southwest Airlines announced it would return to Bush airport for the first time since it stopped serving the airport in 2005. Service began in April 2021 with five nonstop destinations, augmenting the several dozen destinations it serves from Hobby airport. In 2024, however, Southwest suspended the service to Bush airport once again.

On July 20, 2022, Spirit Airlines crew base plans were cleared. It was also announced that Spirit will bring 500 new jobs to the Houston Area. They added Bush airport as their tenth crew base and Focus city.

In 2020, George Bush Intercontinental Airport began undergoing a $1.3 billion capital improvement program called the IAH Terminal Redevelopment Program (ITRP). The flagship project of this program is the construction of the Mickey Leland International Terminal (MLIT), which will consolidate what is today Terminal D and Terminal E into one centralized terminal including a shared ticketing, departure, and arrival hall. Terminal D will be extensively refurbished with a new concourse, Pier D West, being constructed. The ITRP should be complete by late 2024 or early 2025. Future expansion plans call for a Central D and East D pier to be built as passenger numbers grow, with the full project being capable of handling 33 million enplaned international passengers annually. As of March 2026, airlines have started moving their check-in desks from Terminal D to Terminal E, consolidating all international check-in at Terminal E.

In 2023, United Airlines invested over $2 billion into a new transformation program of Terminal B called the 'Terminal B Transformation.' The circa-1969 ticketing lobby and security area will be expanded, but will retain and upgrade architectural elements that defined the original design, like the waffle-style ceiling. The 1960s-style 'flight station' banjos were demolished and will be replaced with two piers, totaling to 765,000 square feet over two levels, housing 22 narrow-body gates for mainline United aircraft. The new United Club will be the largest club in the airline's network, and will feature a multimedia United-branded "park." The existing Terminal B South concourse (2013) will also be getting upgrades, including the conversion of 30 smaller regional jet gates into 18 gates that will accommodate larger two-class regional jets like the Embraer E175, aligning with United's new regional fleet strategy. The new gates will be modeled after United's 'gate of the future' and will all feature jet bridges, which the gates currently lack. The Terminal B Transformation is expected to complete by fall 2026. The roof of the new terminal is also rumored to feature eVTOL Vertiport gates for United.

On December 2, 2025, ITA Airways announced the first ever nonstop flight from Houston to Rome, using the Airbus A330-900, starting on May 1, 2026. ITA is expected to join the Star Alliance in early 2026, and has launched a codeshare agreement with United, a hub airline at IAH.

On May 2, 2026, Spirit Airlines abruptly ceased operations, resulting in the dismantling of their crew and maintenance base at Intercontinental Airport, leaving United Airlines as the sole air carrier to operate a hub or base at Intercontinental Airport. Shortly afterwards, JetBlue announced new service to Fort Lauderdale, FL in order to increase their presence in South Florida while filling in the void left by Spirit Airlines.

== Facilities ==
=== Terminals ===
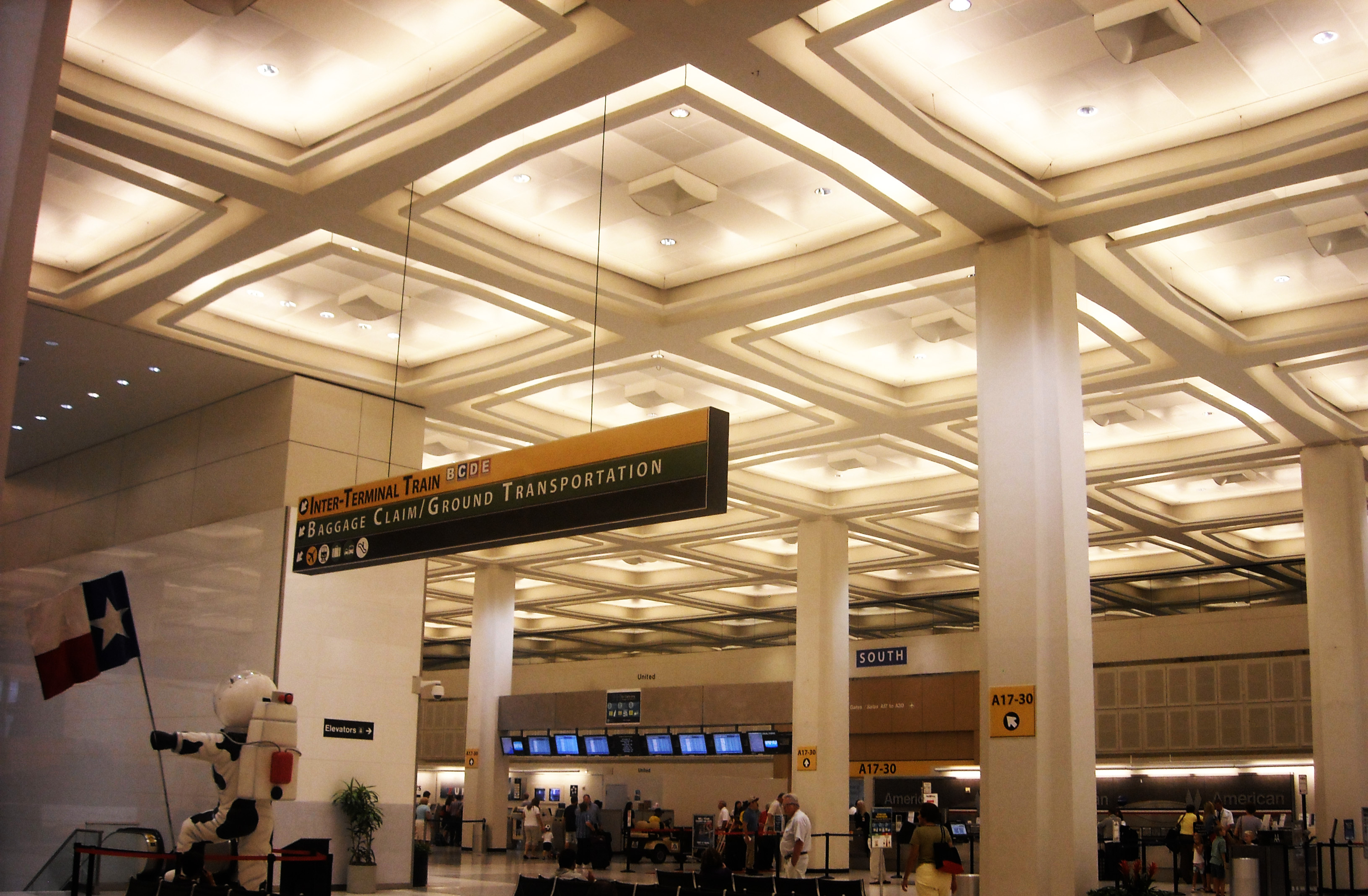
Terminal A

George Bush Intercontinental Airport has five terminals and 116 total gates. The Skyway automated people mover system provides airside connections between all five terminals. The Subway is an automated people mover system that provides landside connections between the five terminals and the airport hotel. Terminals D & E have access to an international arrivals facility, and Terminal D has gates to support super jumbo jets including the Airbus A380 and Boeing 747-8.

- Terminal A is primarily used by non-United domestic carriers and occasionally United Express. The original Terminal A was opened in 1969 coinciding with the opening of IAH, and contained four "banjo" air stations. The original configuration was scrapped in the 1990s. The current terminal spans across two concourses: South (1999) and North (2002), and contains 21 gates.
- Terminal B is used for United Express flights. The original terminal opened in 1969 and was identical to Terminal A. Currently, the south concourse (2013) contains 26 gates across three ground-level piers. Departing passengers wait at a centralized location on the second floor and then head downstairs to one of three piers shortly before their flight. There are no dining or shopping establishments at any of the south concourse piers, nor are passengers permitted to enter the downstairs piers without a valid boarding pass. The 22-gate north expansion is slated to open in fall 2026 as aformentioned, and the current south concourse will receive a gate reduction as part of a revampment effort.
- Terminal C (1981) is used for United domestic flights. It contains 30 gates.
- Terminal D (1990) is primarily used for non-United international flights. It contains 16 gates.
- Terminal E (2003) is used for United international flights and international arrivals. It contains 23 gates.

=== Ground transportation ===
From Downtown Houston one can travel to George Bush Intercontinental by taking I-69/US 59 (Eastex Freeway) to Beltway 8 or to Will Clayton Parkway, and access the airport from either road. From Downtown one could also take I-45 (North Freeway), connect to Beltway 8, and enter the airport from the Beltway. The Hardy Toll Road has an exit from the north or south to the airport.

The Metropolitan Transit Authority of Harris County, Texas, or METRO, offers bus services available at the south side of Terminal C. The 102 Bush IAH Express serves the airport. Previously, METRO also operated an express bus service known as Airport Direct, launched in the summer of 2008, which traveled from Downtown Houston to Terminal C via the HOV lane of the Eastex Freeway (I-69)/(US 59). In 2010, in an effort to increase ridership and maximize revenue, METRO reduced the fare of Airport Direct and closed a dedicated passenger plaza for the service in Downtown Houston; instead, the bus stopped at several downtown hotels. The fare each way was reduced from $15 to $4.50. The fare change increased ridership levels but reduced cash flow. METRO consistently provided the service at an operational loss. However, in the summer of 2011, METRO announced it was discontinuing the Airport Direct service, while the Route 102 local service (which serves the greater Greenspoint business and residential district before traveling on I-45 to access downtown) continued to operate.

As of 2025, Route 102 continues operating between Downtown Houston and the airport, via Greater Greenspoint, with up to 15 minute headway during weekdays. In April 2025, Houston Metro also re-introduced nonstop bus service between Downtown Houston and the airport, operating as Route 500 IAH Downtown Direct. Route 500 operates non-stop between the George R. Brown Convention Center and Terminal E at the airport. The route travels via US-59 with a 30 minute headway. On February 2026, METRO extended the service of the 500 Downtown Direct to operate via Downtown Transit Center and William P. Hobby Airport (HOU) with the same 30 minute headways, in addition, the bus stop at Intercontinental Airport (IAH) was moved to Terminal E - International Terminal, enabling transfer free public transit service between the 2 of Houston's major airports.

Fares for Route 102 is priced at the local bus fare for $1.25 and Route 500 is $4.50.

As of 2016 the Taiwanese airline EVA Air operates a shuttle bus service from Bush IAH to Richardson in the Dallas–Fort Worth area so DFW based customers may fly on its services to and from Houston. Previously China Airlines, also a Taiwanese carrier, provided a shuttle bus service to Sugar Land and the Southwest Houston Chinatown. It ended in 2008 when China Airlines ended its Houston passenger service.

Carriers provide scheduled bus and shuttle services to locations from IAH to NRG Park/NRG Astrodome, Downtown Houston, Uptown, Greenway Plaza, the Texas Medical Center, hotels in the Westchase and Energy Corridor business districts, the city of College Station and William P. Hobby Airport. Super Shuttle uses shared vans to provide services from George Bush Intercontinental Airport to the surrounding communities.

=== Artwork ===
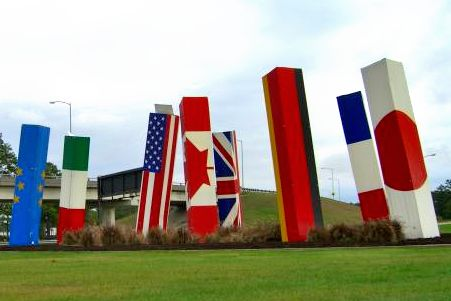
Flag posts of G7 member countries plus the European Union titled Light Spikes located outside the airport entrance

The airport houses over 130 works of art. In July 2024, Andrew Dansby of the Houston Chronicle described IAH as "like the world’s most inefficient art gallery", with 135 public works spread across the facility.

61st Mayor of Houston, Texas Annise Parker led policies to mandate art funding.

Ed Carpenter's "Light Wings", a multicolored glass sculpture suspended below a skylight, adorns the Terminal A North Concourse. In Terminal A, South Concourse stands Terry Allen's "Countree Music." Allen's piece is a cast bronze tree that plays instrumental music by Joe Ely and David Byrne, though the music is normally turned off. The corridor leading to Terminal A displays Leamon Green's "Passing Through," a 200-foot (61 m) etched glass wall depicting airport travelers.

The elevators in Terminal B are cased in stainless steel accordion shaped structures designed by Rachel Hecker. The corridor leading to Terminal B has Dixie Friend Gay's "Houston Bayou." This work is composed of an 8 ft × 75 ft (2.4 m × 22.9 m) Byzantine glass mosaic mural depicting scenes from Houston's bayous and wetlands, several bronze animals embedded in the floor, and five mosaic columns.

"Lights Spikes," designed by Jay Baker, was created for the 1990 G7 Summit when it was hosted by President George H. W. Bush in Houston. The sculpture was relocated to the airport outside E Terminal after the meetings, from its original location in front of the George R. Brown Convention Center. The columns lean at a ten-degree angle toward a central point that represents Houston. The distance between each "spike" and this point is relative to the distance between Houston and the capitals of the countries the flags represent. The countries represented are the United States, the United Kingdom, France, Japan, Canada, Italy and Germany, as well as the European community. The airport has a display of lighted modern sculptures between terminals C and D.

Radiant Fountains, LED-illuminated towers on JFK Boulevard, is the most prominent sculpture around the airport.

Janavi Mahimtura Folmsbee's The Aquarius Art Tunnel, which is decorated like an aquarium, links Terminals D and E. The exhibit won the 2023 CODAawards People's Choice.

2024/25 Terminal D improvements included fresh artwork celebrating the culture and diversity of Houston.

In 2018, c. $850,000 was made available for art in the airport.

Alton Du Laney is the curator of art for Houston's three airports.

In 2019, in Terminal C, United installed works by 19 local artists, at a cost of $1m

Dale Chihuly's Coastal Prairie Fiori, over 500 hand-blown pieces of glass, floral pattern, in 2024

=== Exhibitions ===
- 2003-2005 "Skywall", 60 foot long sculpture with LED lights
- 2019 Apollo 11 Anniversary exhibition (digital art) gallery hosting vivid photography, United Airlines
- 2024 Art Cars - Tribute to Freddie Mercury

=== Other facilities ===
The airport houses an on-site hotel, a Marriott, between Terminals B and C and is accessible via the landside inter-terminal train which runs every 3 minutes from 3:30 am to 12:30 am every day. The hotel has 573 rooms, one restaurant and bar, a concierge lounge, a coffee shop, health club, sundry shop and a conference center.

A VOR station, identified as IAH, is located on the airport property, south of runway 33L.

Minute Suites are available at Terminal C North, offering private relaxation suites and showers past security.

== Airlines and destinations ==
=== Passenger ===
Airlines	Destinations
Aeroméxico	Mexico City–Benito Juárez
Aeroméxico Connect	Mexico City–Benito Juárez
Air Canada	Montréal–Trudeau, Toronto–Pearson, Vancouver
Air France	Paris–Charles de Gaulle
Air New Zealand	Auckland
Alaska Airlines	Portland (OR), Seattle/Tacoma
All Nippon Airways	Tokyo–Haneda
American Airlines	Charlotte, Chicago–O'Hare, Dallas/Fort Worth, Miami, Philadelphia, Phoenix–Sky Harbor
American Eagle	Chicago–O'Hare, Dallas/Fort Worth, Los Angeles, Miami, Philadelphia, Phoenix–Sky Harbor, Washington–National
Avelo Airlines	New Haven
Avianca El Salvador	San Salvador
British Airways	London–Heathrow
Delta Air Lines	Atlanta, Detroit, Los Angeles, Minneapolis/St. Paul, New York–LaGuardia, Salt Lake City
Emirates	Dubai–International
EVA Air	Taipei–Taoyuan
Frontier Airlines	Atlanta, Baltimore, Charlotte, Chicago–O'Hare, Denver, Detroit, Fort Lauderdale, Guatemala City, Las Vegas, Los Angeles, Miami, New Orleans, Ontario, Orlando, Phoenix–Sky Harbor, Raleigh/Durham, San Juan (begins December 17, 2026), San Pedro Sula, San Salvador, Tampa; Seasonal: Cancún
ITA Airways	Rome–Fiumicino
JetBlue	Boston, Fort Lauderdale, New York–JFK
KLM	Amsterdam
Lufthansa	Frankfurt
Qatar Airways	Doha
Turkish Airlines	Istanbul
United Airlines	Albuquerque, Amsterdam, Aruba, Atlanta, Austin, Baltimore, Belize City, Bogotá, Bonaire, Boston, Buenos Aires–Ezeiza, Calgary, Cancún, Caracas (resumes January 12, 2027), Cartagena (begins December 17, 2026), Charlotte, Chicago–O'Hare, Cincinnati, Cleveland, Columbus–Glenn, Cozumel, Dallas/Fort Worth, Denver, Des Moines, Detroit, Edmonton, Fort Lauderdale, Fort Myers, Frankfurt, Georgetown–Cheddi Jagan, Grand Cayman, Greenville/Spartanburg, Guadalajara, Guatemala City, Hartford, Honolulu, Indianapolis, Jacksonville (FL), Kansas City, Las Vegas, León/Del Bajío, Liberia (CR), Lima, London–Heathrow, Los Angeles, Managua, Medellín–JMC, Memphis, Mérida, Mexico City–Benito Juárez, Miami, Midland/Odessa, Minneapolis/St. Paul, Montego Bay, Monterrey, Munich, Nashville, Nassau, New Orleans, New York–LaGuardia, Newark, Omaha, Ontario, Orange County, Orlando, Panama City–Tocumen, Pensacola, Philadelphia, Phoenix–Sky Harbor, Pittsburgh, Portland (OR), Port of Spain, Puerto Vallarta, Punta Cana, Querétaro, Quito, Raleigh/Durham, Rio de Janeiro–Galeão, Roatán, Sacramento, Salt Lake City, San Antonio, San Diego, San Francisco, San José (CR), San José del Cabo, San Juan, San Pedro Sula, San Salvador, São Paulo–Guarulhos, Seattle/Tacoma, St. Louis, St. Thomas, Tampa, Tegucigalpa/Comayagua, Tokyo–Narita, Toronto–Pearson, Tucson, Tulsa, Tulum (ends January 4, 2027), Veracruz, Washington–Dulles, Washington–National, West Palm Beach; Seasonal: Anchorage, Bozeman, Charleston (SC), Durango (CO), Eagle/Vail, Glacier Park/Kalispell, Jackson Hole, McAllen, Montrose, Oklahoma City, Providenciales, Reno/Tahoe, San Luis Potosí, Santiago de Chile, Santo Domingo–Las Américas (begins December 18, 2026), Sydney, Vancouver, Wichita
United Express	Abilene, Aguascalientes, Albuquerque, Alexandria (LA), Amarillo, Atlanta, Austin, Baltimore, Baton Rouge, Birmingham (AL), Brownsville/South Padre Island, Charleston (SC), Charlotte, Chattanooga, Chihuahua (resumes March 28, 2027), Cincinnati, Colorado Springs, Columbus–Glenn, Corpus Christi, Dallas/Fort Worth, Des Moines, Detroit, El Paso, Fayetteville/Bentonville, Grand Rapids, Greenville/Spartanburg, Guadalajara, Gulfport/Biloxi, Harlingen, Hattiesburg/Laurel (MS), Hobbs, Huntsville, Indianapolis, Ixtapa/Zihuatanejo, Jackson (MS), Jacksonville (FL), Joplin (begins March 4, 2027), Kansas City, Knoxville, Lafayette, Lake Charles, Laredo, León/Del Bajío, Little Rock, Louisville, Lubbock, Manzanillo, McAllen, Memphis, Meridian (MS), Midland/Odessa, Milwaukee, Minneapolis/St. Paul, Mobile–Regional, Monterrey, Montgomery, Morelia, Nashville, Natchez, Norfolk, Oaxaca, Oklahoma City, Omaha, Paducah, Panama City (FL), Pensacola, Pittsburgh, Puebla, Puerto Escondido, Querétaro, Raleigh/Durham, Richmond, Salina, Salt Lake City, San Antonio, San Luis Potosí, Savannah, Shreveport, Springfield/Branson, St. Louis, Tampico, Tepic, Tucson, Tulsa, Tuxtla Gutiérrez, Victoria (TX), Wichita; Seasonal: Acapulco, Aspen, Bozeman, Cleveland, Durango (CO), Gunnison/Crested Butte, Hayden/Steamboat Springs, Key West, Mazatlán, Montrose, New Orleans, Palm Springs, Rapid City, Sarasota, Traverse City
Viva	León/Del Bajío, Mexico City–Benito Juárez, Monterrey; Seasonal: Guadalajara, Querétaro
Volaris	Guadalajara, Mexico City–Benito Juárez, Morelia, Puebla, Querétaro, San Luis Potosí
Volaris El Salvador	San Salvador
WestJet	Calgary
Zipair Tokyo	Tokyo–Narita

=== Cargo ===
Airlines	Destinations	Refs
AeroLogic	Frankfurt, Toronto–Pearson	
Turkish Cargo	Istanbul, Madrid, Miami	

== Statistics ==
=== Top destinations ===
==== Domestic ====
Busiest Domestic Routes from IAH (July 2025 – August 2026)
Rank	City	Passengers	Carriers
1	Chicago–O'Hare, Illinois	846,099	American, Frontier, Spirit, United
2	Denver, Colorado	829,919	Frontier, United
3	Los Angeles, California	767,082	American, Delta, Frontier, Spirit, United
4	Atlanta, Georgia	707,695	Delta, Frontier, Spirit, United
5	Dallas/Fort Worth, Texas	628,787	American, United
6	San Francisco, California	613,065	United
7	Newark, New Jersey	563,076	Spirit, United
8	Orlando, Florida	560,231	Frontier, Spirit, United
9	New York–LaGuardia, New York	514,859	Delta, Spirit, United
10	Las Vegas, Nevada	508,334	Frontier, Spirit, United

==== International ====
Busiest International Routes from IAH (July 2025 – August 2026)
Rank	City	Passengers	Carriers
1	Mexico City–Benito Juárez, Mexico	833,296	Aeroméxico, United, Viva, Volaris
2	Cancún, Mexico	654,745	Frontier, Spirit, United
3	San Salvador, El Salvador	636,856	Taca International, United, Volaris El Salvador
4	London–Heathrow, United Kingdom	508,481	British Airways, United
5	Monterrey, Mexico	447,936	United, Viva
6	Frankfurt, Germany	371,331	Lufthansa, United
7	Guatemala City, Guatemala	370,739	Spirit, United
8	Guadalajara, Mexico	363,291	United, Viva, Volaris
9	San José, Costa Rica	324,990	United
10	Panama City, Panama	299,816	United

=== Airline market share ===
Largest airlines at IAH (September 2025 – August 2026)
Rank	Airline	Passengers	Share
1	United Airlines	34,692,697	74.7%
2	American Airlines	2,406,926	5.2%
3	Delta Air Lines	1,942,919	4.2%
4	Frontier Airlines	1,863,445	4.0%
5	Spirit Airlines	1,441,478	3.1%
6	Other Airlines	4,100,000	8.8%

=== Annual traffic ===
Annual passenger traffic (enplaned + deplaned) at IAH, 2002–Present
Year	Passengers	% Change	Year	Passengers	% Change	Year	Passengers	% Change
2002	33,913,759	—	2012	39,890,756	▼0.7%	2022	40,979,422	▲21.7%
2003	34,208,217	▲0.9%	2013	39,799,414	▼0.2%	2023	46,192,499	▲12.7%
2004	36,513,098	▲6.7%	2014	41,257,384	▲3.7%	2024	48,448,545	▲4.9%
2005	39,716,583	▲8.8%	2015	43,023,224	▲4.3%	2025	48,131,213	▼0.7%
2006	42,550,432	▲7.1%	2016	41,692,372	▼3.1%			
2007	42,998,040	▲1.1%	2017	40,372,190	▼2.3%			
2008	41,708,580	▼3.0%	2018	43,807,720	▲7.6%			
2009	40,007,354	▼4.1%	2019	45,276,595	▲3.4%			
2010	40,479,569	▲1.2%	2020	18,217,426	▼59.8%			
2011	40,187,442	▼0.7%	2021	33,677,118	▲84.9%			

== Accidents and incidents ==
- February 1, 1975: a Douglas DC-3 N15HC of Horizon Properties crashed on approach when the port wing collided with an electricity pylon. The aircraft was on a domestic non-scheduled passenger flight from Lawton Municipal Airport, Oklahoma, to Huntsville Regional Airport, Texas. The flight was diverted to Houston for weather. Of the 16 occupants, two crew and three passengers were killed.
- August 23, 1990: a Grumman Gulfstream I operated by Rowan Drilling Company; power loss in an engine after take-off resulted in a failed attempt to regain altitude en route to New Orleans International Airport. The aircraft crashed on departure from Runway 15L and came to rest midfield along a parallel taxiway. There were three fatalities.
- On September 11, 1991, Continental Express Flight 2574 was on descent to the airport when it suffered a structural failure because of improper maintenance, killing all 14 people on board.
- February 19, 1996: a Continental Airlines McDonnell Douglas DC-9-32 operating as Continental Airlines Flight 1943 from Ronald Reagan Washington National Airport, arriving in Houston, landed with its landing gear in the stowed position on Runway 27. The aircraft slid for 6,915 feet (2,108 m) on its belly before stopping on the runway 140 feet (43 m) left of the runway centerline approximately at the departure end of the runway. There were no fatalities and only minor injuries. The aircraft was written off.
- January 13, 1998, a Learjet 25 operated by American Corporate Aviation crashed 2 miles (3.2 km) east of IAH descending below the glideslope. Both occupants were killed.
- February 23, 2019: Atlas Air Flight 3591, a Boeing 767-300ERF operated for Amazon Air crashed into Trinity Bay while on approach, 30 miles (48 km) southeast of the airport. All three crewmembers were killed.
