= Deborah Oropallo =

American artist

Deborah Oropallo (born 1954) is an American artist who is best known for her digital montages. Oropallo produces artworks that conflates symbolic meanings, history and gender. Oropallo lives and works in Berkeley, California.

== Background ==
Oropallo was born and raised in Hackensack, New Jersey. She was heavily inspired from pop arts by prominent artists such as Andy Warhol, Jasper Johns and Robert Rauschenberg since an early age. She studied in Alfred University and got her Bachelor of Fine Arts degree from there; and later received her Masters of Fine Arts from University of California, Berkeley.

Earlier in her career, she mostly produced paintings from already found images, but over the years has evolved to incorporate digital technology. Since 2017, she has collaborated in making video art with Andy Rappaport.

Oropallo's works are held in several museums collections, including the San Francisco Museum of Modern Art, Boise Art Museum, and Stanford University Museum of Art.

== Awards ==
- National Endowment for the Arts (1991)
- Modern Masters Award (1998)
- Pollock-Krasner Foundation Award (2005)
