= Institute of Contemporary Art San José =

Coordinates: 37.3277°N 121.8840°W

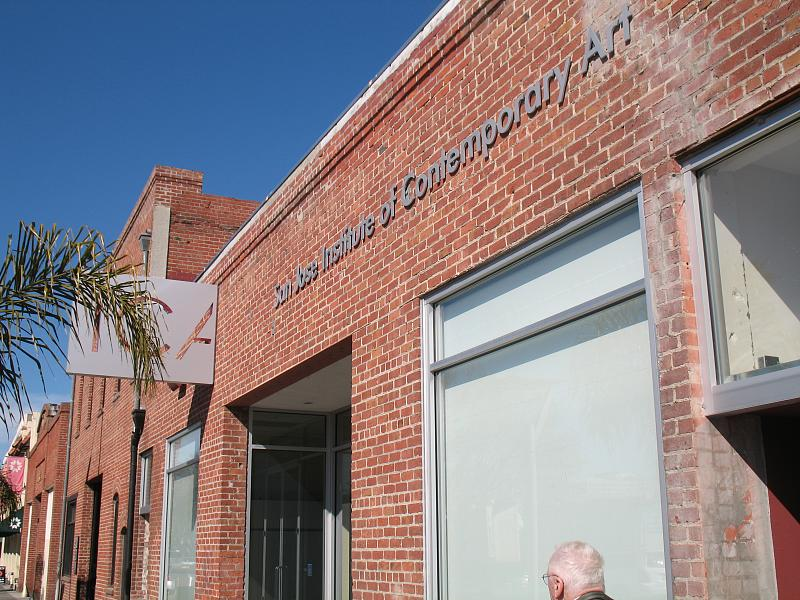
- Abbreviation: SJICA, ICA San Jose
- Formation: 1980
- Type: Nonprofit art center
- Purpose: support of emerging contemporary art and artists
- Location: 560 South First Street San Jose, California 95113
- Key people: James G. Leventhal, Executive Director Haley Kerrigan, Development Manager
- Website: www.icasanjose.org

The Institute of Contemporary Art San José (ICA) is a nonprofit art center and gallery founded in 1980, and located in the SoFA District of Downtown San Jose, California, U.S. It supports contemporary artists working in painting, printmaking, sculpture, photography, new media works and site-specific installations. ICA San José is member and community supported. The art center offers rotating art exhibitions with free admission, along with public programs, education programs, and community events.

== History ==
Established in 1980 as a 501-c-3 nonprofit organization, ICA San José calls home to downtown San Jose. In the year 2000, ICA San José came under the leadership of executive director Cathy Kimball, a former curator at the San Jose Museum of Art. Kimball helped ICA San José to become a better known cultural institution in the Bay Area by presenting the works of renowned artists from the United States and around the world.

After working for years toward their long-term goal of acquiring a permanent home, in 2006 ICA San José purchased a 7,500-square-foot building in the SoFA District (South First Area) of downtown San Jose. The 3,700-square-feet of gallery space within were divided into three different interchangeable gallery spaces that are in cohesive relation to one another. With the increase of gallery space, it allowed for a more continuous and long term exhibition space for site specific, solo, and group installations, a first in ICA San José's history.

In 2011, the art space attracted 20,000 visitors a year. Attendance reportedly continued to increase through 2019.

The Institute of Contemporary Art San José exhibited a series of metal sculpture by California artist Charles Ginnever in 2013.

In 2014, the art center supported a solo exhibition by the painter Amy Ellingson.

An exhibition held in 2019 featured the work of Alan Rath, a pioneer in electronic, kinetic, and robotic artwork.

In June 2020, it was announced that Cathy Kimball would be succeeded by Alison Gass as director of ICA San José.

== See also ==
- Institute of Contemporary Art San Francisco
