= Andrew S. Rappaport =

American venture capitalist (born 1957)

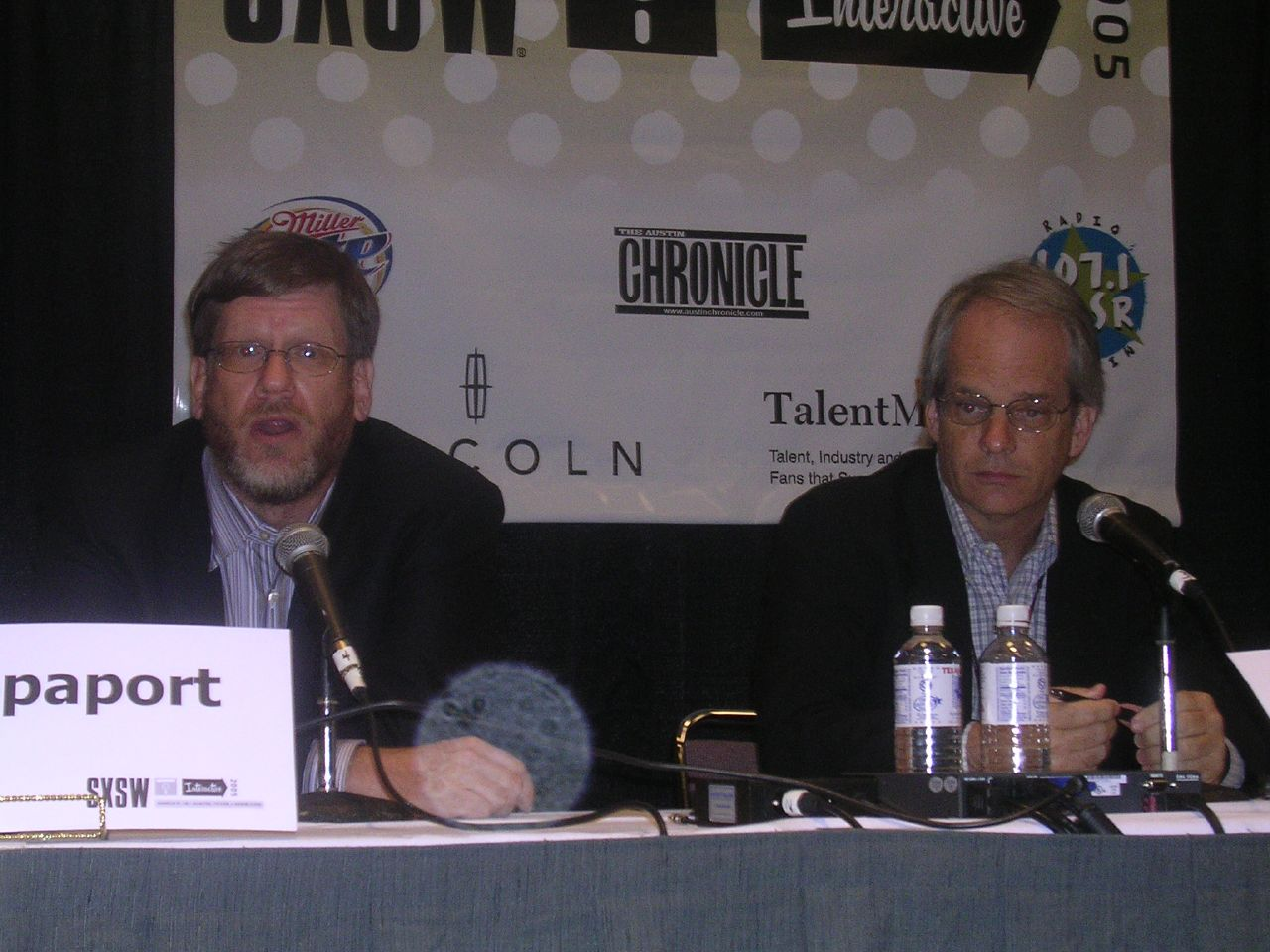
Rappaport (left) and Glenn L. Smith at SXSW 2005. Photo by Jon Lebkowsky

Andrew S. Rappaport (born 1957; New York City), also known as Andy Rappaport, is an American venture capitalist partner and philanthropist. He is a partner emeritus at August Capital, a Silicon Valley information technology venture capital firm where he worked from 1996 until 2013.

Rappaport and his wife founded the Minnesota Street Project in 2016, an arts complex in the Dogpatch neighborhood of San Francisco.

== Early life and education ==
Andrew S. Rappaport was born in 1957 in New York City, New York. He attended Princeton University in the early 1970s, but dropped out in the second year.

Rappaport was Senior Editor of EDN Magazine. He was also a research physicist with Panametrics, Inc. In his early 20s he was founder and president of his own audiophile consumer-electronics company.

== Career ==
In 1984, he founded a strategic consulting firm in Boston, the Technology Research Group (TRG). For over thirteen years he was the president of TRG. Rappaport was also a founder of the Massachusetts Center for Technology Growth, a private economic-development organization and a director of the Massachusetts Microelectronics Center. He has lectured and written on the economics of changing technology. The Computerless Computer Company, which he wrote together with Shmuel Halevi, won the McKinsey award for Harvard Business Review article of the year in 1991. He also holds a US patent. Prior to joining August Capital, he was involved in more than a dozen venture capital-backed start-ups since 1985 including Actel, Atheros Communications, Genoa Corp, MMC networks, Silicon Architects (acquired by Synopsys), Silicon Image, Viewlogic, and Transmeta.

Rappaport joined August Capital in 1996, which prompted his family's move to California. His expertise is in the areas of technology and finance related to open-source software, broadband communications, semiconductors, and computer systems. Rappaport has served on more than 30 public and private company boards. In December 2013, he left August Capital.

He is a guitarist, composer, and guitar collector. Since 2017, he has collaborated in making video art with Deborah Oropallo. He has three daughters.

== Philanthropy ==
He and his wife, Deborah Rappaport, are the founders of the Rappaport Family Foundation, and Skyline Public Works that funds a variety of non-profit organizations and some commercial ventures too. One of the commercial ventures they sponsor is Huffington Post. They also fund the Participatory Culture Foundation, an open-source video-based browser developer.

The Rappaport's founded the Minnesota Street Project (MSP) in 2016, a dual for-profit/foundation model art space with gallery space, event space, and subsidized artist studios. Additionally they invested in both restaurants connected to the MSP complex, the shuttered Daniel Patterson "Alta MSP" and the replacement Heena Patel's "Besharam".

In 2021, the Rappaport's helped fund the opening of the Institute of Contemporary Art San Francisco (ICA SF), alongside funds from Pamela and David Hornik; and Kaitlyn and Mike Krieger.

== Sources ==
- Skyline Public Works biography on the Rappaports
