= Kevin Systrom =

American computer programmer and entrepreneur (born 1983)

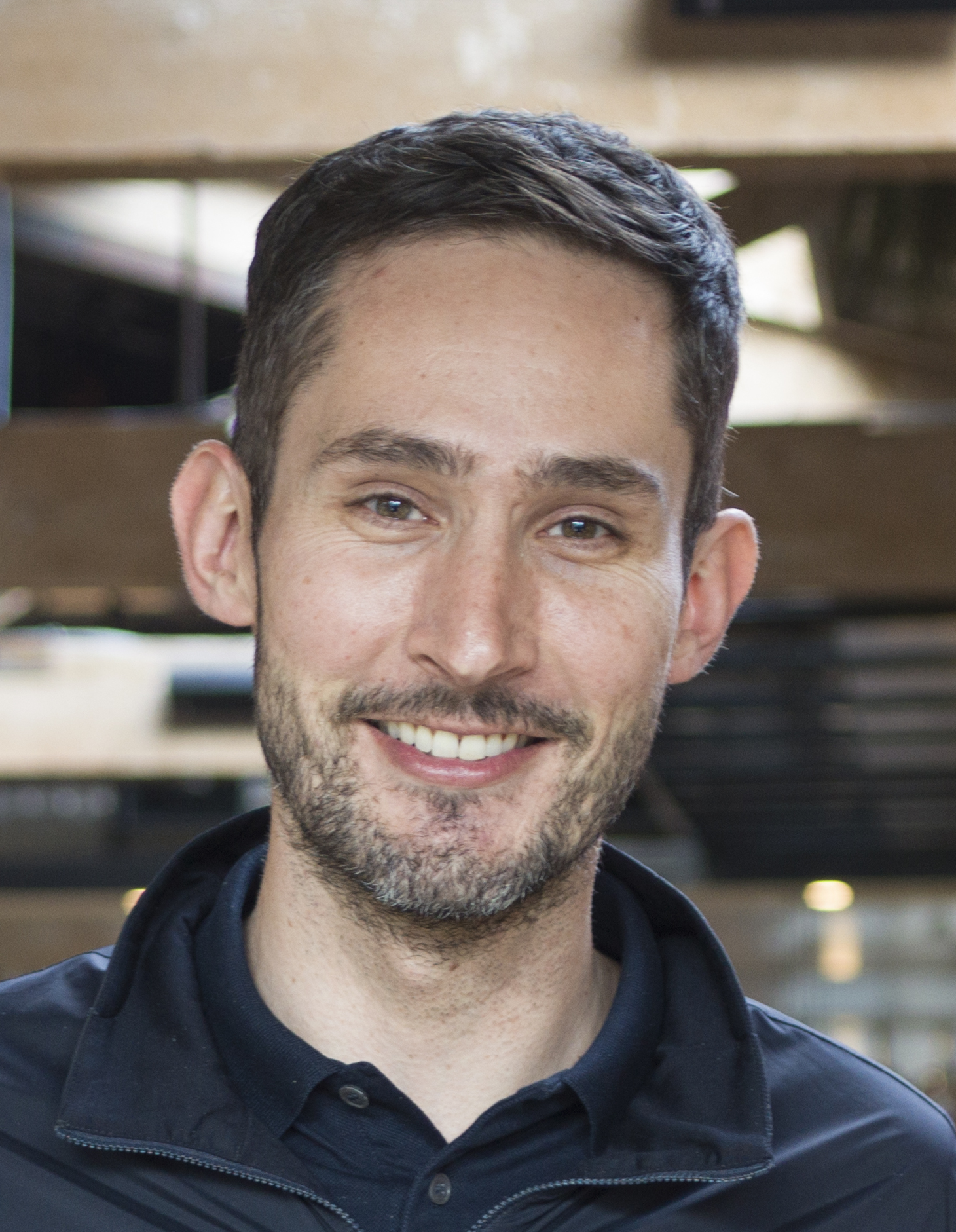
- Systrom in 2018
- Born: December 30, 1983 (age 42); Holliston, Massachusetts, US
- Education: Stanford University (BS)
- Occupations: Businessperson, computer programmer
- Known for: Co-founder and former CEO, Instagram
- Height: 196 cm (6 ft 5 in)
- Board member of: Walmart (2014–2018)
- Spouse: Nicole Schuetz (m. 2016)

Kevin Systrom (born December 30, 1983) is an American computer programmer and entrepreneur. He co-founded Instagram, along with Mike Krieger.

Kevin Systrom was included on the list of America's Richest Entrepreneurs Under 40 2016. Under Systrom as CEO, Instagram became a fast growing app, with 800 million monthly users as of September 2017. He resigned as the CEO of Instagram on September 24, 2018.

Meta Platforms (then Facebook, Inc.) bought Instagram for $1 billion in 2012, a large sum at that time for a company that had 13 employees. Instagram today has over three billion users and contributes over $20 billion to Meta Platforms's annual revenue.

== Early life and education ==
Kevin Systrom was born on December 30, 1983, in Holliston, Massachusetts, US He is the son of Diane, a marketing executive at Zipcar, who also worked at Monster.com and Swapit during the dot-com bubble, and Douglas Systrom, Vice President of Human Resources at TJX Companies.

Kevin Systrom attended Middlesex School in Concord, Massachusetts, where he was introduced to computer programming. His interest grew from playing Doom 2 and creating his own levels as a child.

He worked at Boston Beat, a vinyl record music store in Boston, while he was in high school.

Kevin Systrom attended Stanford University and graduated in 2006 with a bachelor's degree in management science and engineering. At Stanford, he was a member of the Sigma Nu fraternity. He turned down a recruitment offer from Mark Zuckerberg and instead spent the winter term of his third year in Florence, where he studied photography. Systrom was chosen as one of twelve students to participate in the Mayfield Fellows Program at Stanford University. The fellowship led to his internship at Odeo, the company that eventually became Twitter.

== Career ==
=== Google ===
After graduating from Stanford, he joined Google where he worked on Gmail, Google Calendar, Docs, Spreadsheets, and other products. He spent two years at Google as a product marketer.

=== Burbn ===
Systrom made the prototype of what later became Burbn and pitched it to Baseline Ventures and Andreessen Horowitz at a party. He came up with the idea while on a vacation in Mexico when his girlfriend was unwilling to post her photos because they did not look good enough when taken by the iPhone 4 camera. The solution to the problem was to use filters, effectively hiding the qualitative inferiority of the photographs. Subsequently, Systrom developed the X-Pro II filter that is still in use on Instagram today.

After the first meeting, he decided to quit his job in order to explore whether or not Burbn could become a company. Within 2 weeks of quitting his job, he received US$500,000 seed funding round from both Baseline Ventures and Andreessen Horowitz. While in San Francisco, Systrom and Mike Krieger built Burbn, an HTML 5 check-in service, into a product that allowed users to do many things: check into locations, make plans (future check-ins), earn points for hanging out with friends, post pictures, and much more. However, recalling their studies in Mayfield Fellows Program, Krieger and Systrom identified that Burbn contained too many features and the users did not want a complicated product. They decided to focus on one specific feature, photo-sharing. The development of Burbn led to creation of Instagram.

=== Instagram ===
In 2010, Kevin Systrom co-founded the photo-sharing and, later, video-sharing social networking service Instagram with Mike Krieger in San Francisco, California.

A month after launching, Instagram had grown to 1 million users. A year later, Instagram hit more than 10 million users.

Systrom at the 6th Annual Crunchies Awards in 2013

In April 2012, Instagram, along with 13 employees, was sold to Facebook for US$1 billion in cash and stock. According to multiple reports, the deal netted Systrom US$400 million based on his ownership stake in the business. One of the key contributions to the acquisition was that Mark Zuckerberg stated Facebook was "committed to building and growing Instagram independently", allowing Systrom to continue to lead Instagram. Systrom stated in an interview with Bloomberg that the pros of becoming a part of Facebook were that "we got to pair up with a juggernaut of a company that understands how to grow, understands how to build a business, has one of the best, if not the best, management team in tech and we got to use them as our resource".

In an interview with Forbes, he stated that "Instagram is a new form of communication that's an ideal fit with the always-with-you iPhone in today's social media world. Instagram's a social network built around photos, where people can quickly comment on or 'like' photos and share them on Twitter or Facebook." Systrom identified Instagram as a media company, which explains the roll-out of video advertisement by big companies such as The Walt Disney Company, Activision, Lancôme, Banana Republic and CW in late 2014.

On September 24, 2018, it was announced that Kevin Systrom resigned from Instagram.

=== Artifact ===
On January 31, 2023, Mike Krieger and Kevin Systrom launched Artifact, an AI-powered news app, on the App Store and Google Play. After announcing the app would be shut down in January 2024, Artifact was eventually acquired by Yahoo for integration into their news products.

== Views on copying ideas in the industry ==
Instagram has been accused on multiple occasions for copying various new functions from its closest competitor Snapchat. Regarding the issue, Systrom argued that all new services launched by tech companies nowadays are "remixes" of existing products, and that "all of these ideas are original when you remix them and bring your own flavour". Systrom also argued that 'you can trace the roots of every feature anyone has in their app, somewhere in the history of technology' and that this was simply 'just the way Silicon Valley works.'

== Forbes list ==
In 2014, Kevin Systrom was listed in the Forbes 30 "Under 30" list under the "Social/Mobile category."

In 2016, the magazine ranked Kevin Systrom as a billionaire with an estimated net worth of US$1.1 billion. The fortune came about as a result of Facebook stocks rising more than 500%.

== Personal life ==
In February 2016, Kevin Systrom met with Pope Francis at the Vatican, where they discussed the power of images in uniting people "across borders, cultures and generations".

On October 31, 2016, Kevin Systrom married Nicole Systrom (née Schuetz), founder and CEO of clean-energy investment firm Sutro Energy Group, in Napa, California. The two met at Stanford and were engaged in 2014.
