= San Francisco Art Book Fair =

Annual art book fair in San Francisco, California

- Frequency: Annually
- Venue: Minnesota Street Project
- Locations: San Francisco, California, U.S.
- Inaugurated: 2016
- Founders: Colpa Press, Park Life, Minnesota Street Project
- Organizer: Minnesota Street Project Foundation
- Website: sfartbookfair.com

The San Francisco Art Book Fair (SFABF) is a free annual multi-day art book fair held in July at the Minnesota Street Project art space in San Francisco, California. The fair focuses on artists' books, periodicals, zines, and other printed matter by independent artists and publishers. The fair features exhibitions, film screenings, artists' talks, workshops, book launches and performances.

The SFABF was founded in 2016 by publisher Colpa Press, bookshop and gallery Park Life, and the Minnesota Street Project, which opened that same year. The fair has been held annually since then, with the exception of 2020 and 2021. Since 2023, the fair has been presented by the Minnesota Street Project Foundation, the art space's affiliated nonprofit.
