= Artifact (app) =

News app

- Original authors: Kevin Systrom (CEO); Mike Krieger (CTO)
- Developers: Nokto, Inc.
- Release: January 31, 2023; 3 years ago
- Final release: 1.98 / 4 October 2023
- Operating system: iOS, Android
- Size: 107.8 megabyte
- Type: News aggregator
- Website: artifact.news

Artifact was a personalized social news aggregator app that uses recommender systems to suggest articles. Launched in January 2023 by Nokto, Inc., a company founded by co-founders of Instagram Kevin Systrom and Mike Krieger, the app was available for iOS and Android. The app's name is a portmanteau of the words "articles", "artificial intelligence", and "fact". The app shut down in January 2024 as a result of low interest.

== History ==
Nokto, Inc. was established on March 3, 2022, as a foreign stock company in California, with its headquarters in San Francisco.

The company's main product, Artifact, is the first new product launched by Krieger and Systrom since their 2018 resignation from Instagram after conflicts with parent company Meta, which acquired Instagram in 2012.

Artifact launched on January 31, 2023, after the team had been working on it for over a year, offering the option to sign up for a waiting list for its private beta, which grew to about 160,000 people, and then launching in open beta on February 22, 2023.

With a team of seven employees in San Francisco, the app was free, although the founders explained that alternative business models - such as advertising or subscription fees - could be explored in the future.

In January 2024, cofounder Kevin Systrom announced that the app would be shutting down after concluding that "the market opportunity isn’t big enough to warrant continued investment in this way."

In April 2024, it was announced Artifact had been acquired by Yahoo, who intended to use the service's technology in an upgraded Yahoo! News app.

== Features ==
Frequently described as "TikTok for text" and a competitor to Twitter, Artifact was a news aggregator that used machine learning to make personalized recommendations based on topics, news sources, and authors that the reader is interested in. In addition to reading articles, the app offered the ability to like articles, leave comments, or listen to an audio version of an article read by AI-generated voices, including a simulation of the voices of Snoop Dogg or Gwyneth Paltrow. AI could also rewrite clickbait headlines that users flagged. Artifact later expanded to a social network where users could post links, images and text to their profile, which could be liked or commented on by other users. Similar to other social news websites like Reddit, reader accounts had profiles with reputation scores.
