= WePay =

Online payment service provider

WePay, Inc.
- Type: Subsidiary
- Industry: Technology
- Founded: 2008 in Boston, Massachusetts
- Headquarters: Redwood City, California
- Key people: Bill Clerico (Former CEO); Richard Aberman (CSO)
- Number of employees: 250–300
- Parent: JPMorgan Chase
- Website: go.wepay.com

WePay is an online payment service provider based in the United States. It provides an integrated and customizable payment solution, through its APIs, to platform businesses such as crowdfunding sites, marketplaces and small business software companies. It also offers partners fraud and risk protection.

== History ==
WePay was founded by Rich Aberman and Bill Clerico in 2008 in Boston, Massachusetts, and is now headquartered in Redwood City, California. The original inspiration for WePay occurred to Aberman when he had difficulty raising money for his brother's bachelor party. Aberman had to collect $4,200 from 14 friends spread across the United States to pay for bottle service at a club, rent at a Florida beach house, and food. Through a series of cash, checks, and PayPal money transfers, Aberman was eventually able to collect the money he needed. Aberman found the process very burdensome and believed that there should be an easier way to collect money from people. After studying PayPal's weaknesses, Aberman asked Clerico to help him to solve this problem and create WePay.

Aberman and Clerico were accepted by Y Combinator in California, which prompted Aberman and Clerico to move the company to the Silicon Valley. On the West Coast, they received monetary support from Max Levchin, a cofounder of PayPal, and Ron Conway, an angel investor. The company received $1.65 million from August Capital during initial fundraising efforts; by August 2010, it received an additional $7.5 million from Highland Capital Partners and August Capital. By December 2010, WePay had raised $9 million in funding. Other investors include Orlando Ramos, founder of Cyberpower Depot, Steve Chen, a cofounder of YouTube, and Eric Dunn, a former CTO of Intuit, as well as entrepreneur Dave McClure. In May 2011, founders Bill Clerico and Rich Aberman were named two of the Best Young Tech Entrepreneurs by Bloomberg Businessweek. In 2014, WePay discontinued its donation service to focus on its other products. In 2015, WePay raised a $40 million round from FTV Capital and the Japanese e-commerce company Rakuten. According to Former CEO Bill Clerico, the purpose of this round was to accelerate WePay's efforts to expand its efforts to support payments in more countries internationally. In October 2017, JPMorgan Chase announced that it would acquire WePay for a reported valuation of over $220 million.

== Services ==
WePay is a privately held company that offers payment capabilities to business platforms, making money through charging service fees when processing funds. WePay enables payments to platforms through its APIs.

WePay offers fraud and risk protection as a service through its proprietary risk prevention system and through several third party vendors. The company detects fraud by using a number of data sources, including social data connections as well as machine learning algorithms. According to Aberman, "[WePay uses] your online identity to verify your identity in the real world."

== Growth ==
In early 2015, WePay opened its services to businesses in Canada. In 2016, the payment facilitator also announced opening operations for businesses in the United Kingdom.

In 2016, the Silicon Valley Business Journal shared that WePay is among its top 500 fastest growing privately held startups with over 1500% growth from the prior year. In September 2011, the company employed 30 people. Cofounder Clerico stated in an interview with Forbes contributor Elizabeth Woyke that billions of dollars are channeled through the company's services each week. In October 2011, the number of WePay employees increased by 20%. After its Series D round in 2015, the company said that it had over 100 employees, and had plans to grow to 200 in the next 18 months. WePay now has over 180 employees located in California, Rhode Island, and the UK. WePay has also been recognized by multiple sources like PR Newswire as one of the best companies to work for in the Bay Area.

== Partnerships ==
As of 2015, WePay was used by over 1,000 businesses and nonprofits. The company has worked with Apple Pay and Android Pay to enable customers to transact those forms of payment.

== Movements ==
The founders of WePay made an unexpected appearance at PayPal's 2010 developer conference in San Francisco, California. The stunt involved dropping a 600-pound block of ice filled with hundreds of dollar bills. The statement was that PayPal freezes your money and that better payment processors exist.

In 2011, the company was used by many Occupy Wall Street supporters to donate money to the movement, which resulted in a surge of transactions. Dominic Basulto of The Washington Post called WePay the "de facto official way" to give financial donations to the Occupy movement "while simultaneously bypassing the largest financial institutions". By October 27, 2011, over 8,000 donors from 37 countries had donated $325,000 to the movement. The donations are funneled through 300 Occupy-affiliated accounts, which are linked on Occupy Wall Street's website, Twitter, and Facebook accounts.

WePay has supported fundraising efforts for hundreds of disaster relief campaigns and humanitarian causes through crowdfunding sites. Some of these campaigns relate to Hurricane Sandy, Earthquakes in Nepal, the Sandy Hook Elementary School shooting, the Orlando nightclub shooting and many more. However, WePay declined to process payments for over $24,000 in donations to legal cannabis growers affected by the October 2017 Northern California wildfires.
