= Liz Hernández =

Mexican-born American visual artist (b. 1993)

- Born: Elizabeth Hernández; 1993 (age 32–33); Mexico City, Mexico
- Other names: Liz Hernandez
- Education: California College of the Arts (BFA)
- Occupations: Visual artist, graphic designer
- Spouse: Ryan Whelan
- Website: liz-hernandez.com

Elizabeth Hernández (born 1993) is a Mexican-born American visual artist and designer. She works many mediums including in painting, murals, ceramics, and embossed aluminum sculpture. She lives in Oakland, California.

== Biography ==
Liz Hernández was born in 1993, in Mexico City, Mexico. She was raised in the suburbs of Mexico City, and at age 19 she moved to the San Francisco Bay Area to attend college.

Hernández received a BFA degree in industrial design in 2015 from the California College of the Arts in San Francisco.

Her husband and sometimes artistic collaborator is artist Ryan Whelan. In 2023, she and Whelan exhibited at "A Weed By Any Other Name" at the newly opened Institute of Contemporary Art San Francisco (ICA SF) in the Dogpatch. In 2024, she was the Harker Artist-in-Residence for a year at San Francisco State University.

Her work is part of the museum collections at the San Francisco Museum of Modern Art, and the Fine Arts Museums of San Francisco.

== Exhibitions ==
- 2015 – "Tortillería Horizontal", site specific group project, Mexico City, Mexico
- 2020 – "Talisman: Liz Hernández", Pt. 2 Gallery, Oakland, California
- 2021 – "Californisme Partie 2", Bim Bam Gallery, Paris, France
- 2022 – "Tikkun: For the Cosmos, the Community, and Ourselves", Contemporary Jewish Museum, San Francisco, California
- 2022 – "Bay Area Walls", San Francisco Museum of Modern Art (SFMoMA), San Francisco, California
- 2023 – "A Weed By Any Other Name", Institute of Contemporary Art San Francisco (ICA SF), San Francisco, California
- 2023 – "Shifting the Silence", San Francisco Museum of Modern Art (SFMoMA), San Francisco, California

== See also ==
- Chicana art
