= Radiant Fountains =

Sculpture by Dennis Oppenheim in Houston, Texas, U.S.

- Artist: Dennis Oppenheim
- Year: 2010
- Type: Sculpture
- Medium: Stainless steel; LED lighting
- Location: Houston, Texas, United States; 29.967288°N 95.336777°W

Radiant Fountains is a 2010 sculpture by Dennis Oppenheim, installed outside Houston's George Bush Intercontinental Airport, in the U.S. state of Texas.

== Description and history ==
Installed along JFK Boulevard, the work was commissioned by the Houston Arts Alliance. It is made of stainless steel and programmed LED lights. CBC Arts described the sculpture as "a spray of acrylic lights", and Artnet's Brook S. Mason called the work "towering brilliant lighting".

The Museum of Fine Arts, Houston's collection has multiple 2010 drawings by Oppenheim called Radiant Fountain.

== Reception ==
Molly Glentzer of the Houston Chronicle called the sculpture "dazzling" and said the "cluster of splash-inspired towers ... has historically been touchy". Bespoke Concierge magazine's Cynthia Lescalleet said Radiant Fountains is "eye-popping". Tommy Gregory, who serves as public art program curator for the Houston Airport System, has said Radiant Fountains is a "marquee permanent work" of the collection. Houstonia's Michael has also called Radiant Fountains the airport's most prominent public artwork.

== See also ==
- George Bush Intercontinental Airport#Artwork
- List of public art in Houston
