= Still Dancing =

Sculpture by Dennis Oppenheim

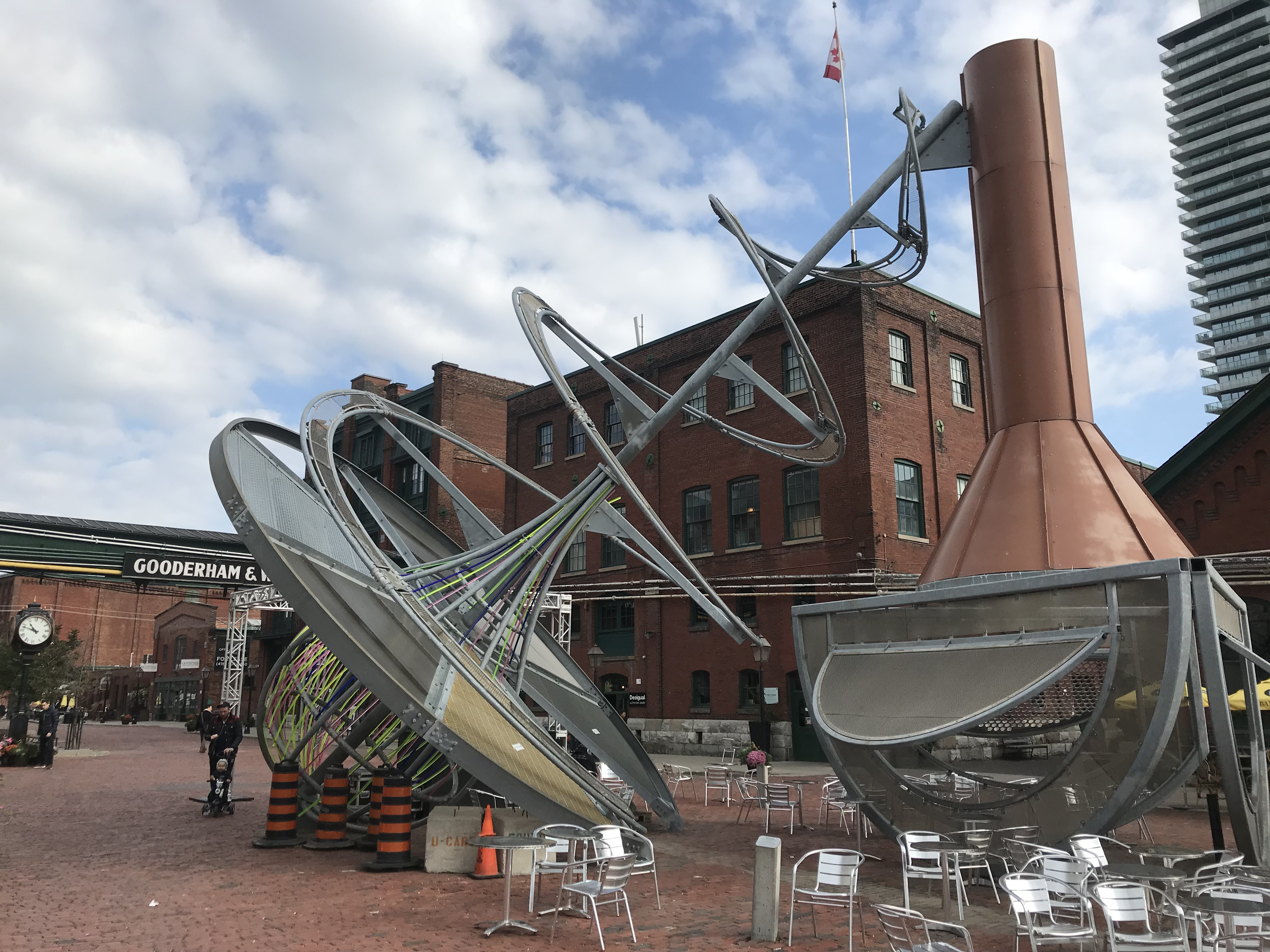
- The sculpture in 2018
- Artist: Dennis Oppenheim
- Location: Toronto, Ontario, Canada
- 43°38′59.2″N 79°21′33.9″W

Still Dancing is a sculpture by American artist Dennis Oppenheim, installed in Toronto's Distillery District, in Ontario, Canada.
