= Stephen Andrews (artist) =

Canadian artist based in Toronto (born 1956)

- Born: 1956 (age 69–70); Sarnia, Ontario, Canada
- Awards: Governor General's Award in Visual and Media Arts (2019)

Stephen Andrews (born 1956) is a Canadian artist based in Toronto. He is known for using various media to explore matters such as memory and loss, and technology, and its representations.

== Art practice ==
The artist has stated that in his work he renders "the digital, the dot matrix in print reproduction, film or television technologies...by hand in an attempt to represent both the message and the means by which it is delivered." By using a technique that gives equal weight to both media and message of his chosen topics, Andrews creates a space for reflection on our daily consumption of the imagery we get from what he calls "virtual or ether" media. The portrait series of graphite-and-oil-rubbed wax tablets, Facsimile (1991–1992) uses obituary portraits of men who have died from HIV/AIDS as source material, "reproduced from faxed images...the details are pixellated, smudgy." By this method, "Facsimile... designates the technology of reproduction and transmission that inhabits the images." Atom Egoyan writing about a show he curated of Andrews' work notes, "Facsimile's most haunting aspect...is how it traces the erosion and evolution of personal identity from an anonymous mediated source."

While Andrews' output prior to 1996 tends to be in black and white or monochrome, around this time he introduced colour into his work. The Weather Series (1996) begins the artists' extended investigation into the processes of colour generation and the four-colour separation printing processes. For Andrews, weather provides an analogy for the quickly changing circumstances of life, which he likens to his own experience of living with HIV. Andrews' method of homemade colour separation evokes both the 19th-century painting technique of Pointillism "in which small, distinct dots of pure color are applied in patterns to form an image", and the Ben-Day dots of mechanical printing. But Andrews creates works that "hover at legibility." "The pixilation or dot matrix completely obscures details, making specifics impossible to see. We can't grasp the full picture." The series of rubbed-crayon drawings, The Quick and the Dead (2004), feature stills derived from video footage of the Iraq war. Considered in relation to the source material Andrews uses, the work has political implications, "suggesting the impossibility of knowing the circumstances and contexts of what they depict". The artist has stated the series is:

"my response to the lack of photographic evidence of the war...information was really only available on websites at that time. The disposability of these media images is in stark contrast to the effects on the lives of those involved."

Andrews also used 600 drawings from the series to create his one-minute animation, The Quick and the Dead (2004). In Cartoon (2007), he continues to use media sources to create drawings.

== Trump Tower commission (Toronto) ==
The Trump Tower in Toronto commissioned a mosaic version of the Andrews' work A small part of something larger (2009). As part of his development of the work, Andrews created The View From Here a large-scale triptych of a "tightly cropped crowd scene" The mosaic of 500,000 small porcelain, glass, stone and gold tiles was crafted by Montreal-based Mosaika Art & Design.

== Selected publications ==
- "The Story So Far: An Interview with Stephen Andrews". bordercrossingsmag.com. Bordercrossings magazine, Dec 2011.
- Stephen Andrews: Picture Maker, Alexander Nagel, Canadian Art, Winter (2007)
- Subtitles, Atom Egoyan ed., Alphabet City No. 9 (2005) ISBN 978-0-262-05078-4
- Lost in the Archives, Rebecca Comay ed., Alphabet City No. 7 ISBN 978-0-9730550-0-9
- Stephen Andrews, Cue Art Foundation (2004) ASIN: B00420R4FI
- Stephen Andrews: Likeness, A. Hurtig, S. Watson eds. (2001) ISBN 0-88865-620-3
- Autobiography, North Dakota Museum of Art (1995)
- Stephen Andrews: Facsimile, Oakville Galleries (1992) ISBN 0-921027-33-8
- Dark O'Clock, Plug In Editions (1995) ASIN: B00319N9VO

== Selected exhibitions ==
- Andrews, POV, Art Gallery of Ontario, Toronto, 2015
- X, Paul Petro Contemporary Art, Toronto, 2012
- Stephen Andrews, Illingworth Kerr Gallery, ACAD, 2011
- It Is What It Is, Recent Acquisitions, National Gallery of Canada, Ottawa, 2010
- Cartoon, The Power Plant, Toronto, 2007
- As above, so below, Paul Petro Contemporary Art, Toronto, 2009
- The Quick and the Dead, Gallery Lambton, Sarnia, 2008
- Biennale de Montreal, 2007
- Forecast, JB Gallery Hart House University of Toronto, Toronto, 2006
- A deer in the headlights (remix), Platform Gallery, Seattle
- Stephen Andrews, Cue Art Foundation, New York, 2004
- The 1st part of the 2nd half, Dazibao, Montreal, 2002
- Likeness, Morris and Helen Belkin Art Gallery, UBC, 2001

== Selected public collections ==
- Art Gallery of Hamilton
- Art Gallery of Ontario, Toronto
- National Gallery of Canada, Ottawa
- Oakville Galleries, Oakville, Ontario
- Agnes Etherington Art Centre, Kingston, Ontario
- Art Museum, University of Toronto
- Judith & Norman Alix Art Gallery, Sarnia, Ontario

== Awards ==
Governor General's Award in Visual and Media Arts (2019)
