= Institute of Contemporary Art San Francisco =

San Francisco art museum

- Abbreviation: ICA San Francisco, ICA SF
- Formation: October 1, 2022; 3 years ago
- Founding Director: Ali Gass
- Website: www.icasf.org

The Institute of Contemporary Art San Francisco (ICA SF) is an American contemporary art museum that opened in October 2022. It was initially located in the Dogpatch neighborhood of San Francisco, California. By October 2024, it had moved to the Financial District of San Francisco. A year later, ICA transitioned to a "city-wide nomadic model" of pop-up exhibitions.

== About ==
The Institute of Contemporary Art San Francisco is a non-collecting institution and charges no admissions. Ali Gass is its founding director. In October 2022, it opened a 11,000-square-foot gallery space at 901 Minnesota Street in San Francisco's Dogpatch neighborhood, funded through Silicon Valley–based donors. Donors of the opening of ICA SF included Deborah and Andy Rappaport, Pamela and David Hornik, and Kaitlyn and Mike Krieger. The space was designed after the European kunsthalle, specializing in displaying temporary, boundary-pushing art.

In 2024, ICA SF relocated to a larger five-story modernist building known locally as "the Cube" at 345 Montgomery Street in the city’s Financial District, owned by Vornado Realty Trust and The Trump Organization. The move, part of an effort to revitalize the neighborhood, was facilitated by Vornado offering free rent and utilities for two years, and expanded ICA's exhibition space from 11,000 square feet to 26,000 square feet. As reported by the San Francisco Standard, "curators and visitors often noted that The Cube posed significant challenges; namely, the scale of the interior made it difficult to present artwork effectively." In October 2025, ICA announced that it would be leaving The Cube (which by that time had secured a 10-year lease with the Wharton Business School) in December 2025 and transition to a "city-wide nomadic model" of pop-up exhibitions.

== Exhibitions ==
The opening programming was a solo exhibition by Choctaw-Cherokee artist Jeffrey Gibson's, "This Burning World"; and a group exhibition curated by Tahirah Rasheed and Autumn Breon, of work by Oakland-based artists Liz Hernández and Ryan Whelan. Notable shows have included The Poetics of Dimension (2024–2025), a multiple artist exhibition curated by Larry Ossei–Mensah.

== See also ==
- Institute of Contemporary Art San José
- Minnesota Street Project
- Wattis Institute for Contemporary Art
