= David Marquardt =

American businessman

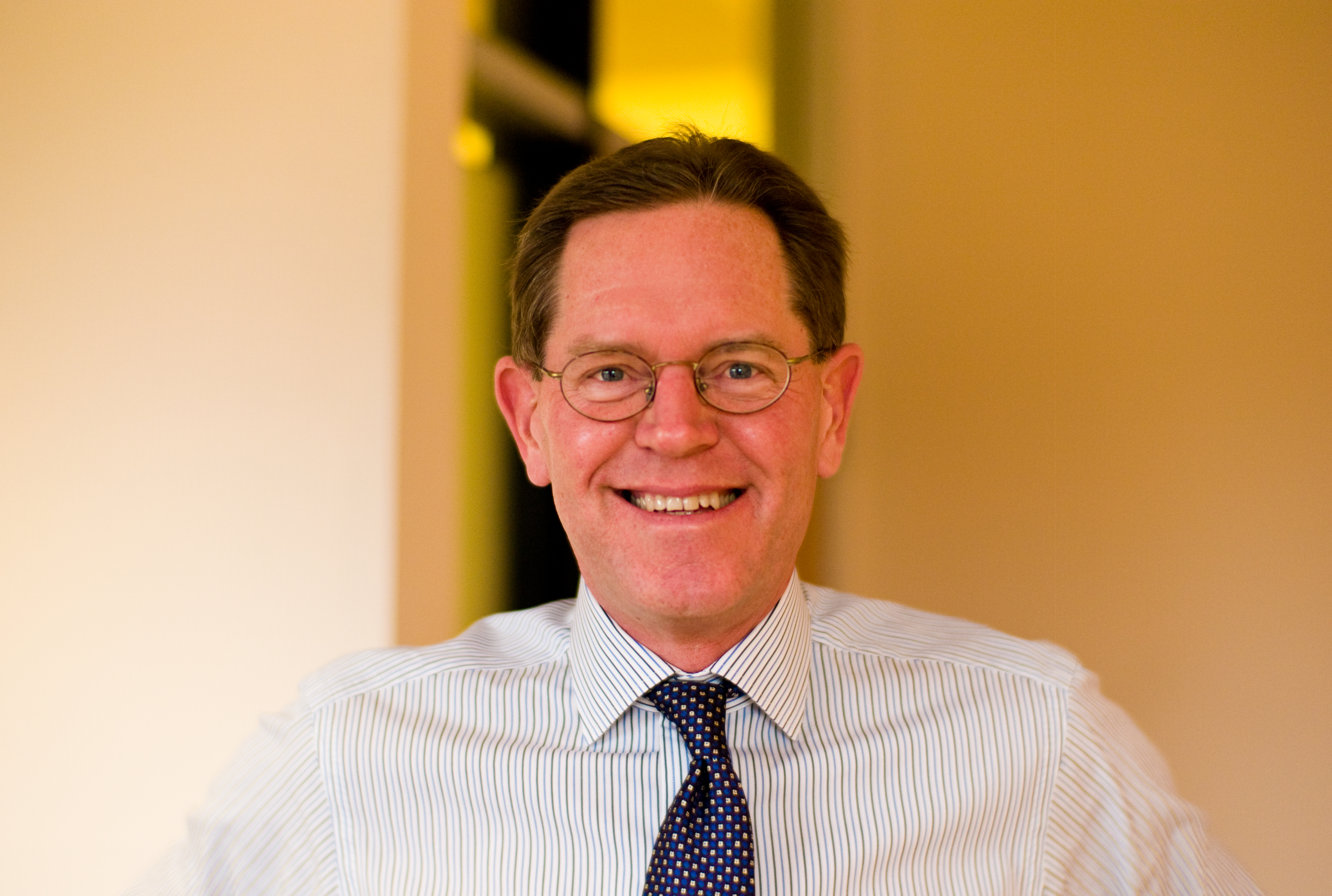
- Marquardt in 2007
- Born: February 1, 1949 (age 77); Montclair, New Jersey, U.S.A.
- Education: Columbia University (BS); Stanford University (MBA)
- Occupation: Private Equity Investor
- Known for: Microsoft BOD 1981-2014, co-founder of August Capital 1995, Technology Venture Investors 1980
- Board member of: Institute for Advanced Study in Princeton, NJ
- Spouse: Lori Wraith Marquardt
- Children: Adam (b. March 19, 1995); Hope (b. January 20, 1990) Deke (b. September 30, 1992)

David F. Marquardt (born February 1, 1949) is a private equity investor and was a co-founder of venture capital firm August Capital in 1995. He has served on more than 35 boards of directors during his 40-year venture capital career including Microsoft, Sun Microsystems (acquired by Oracle), Seagate, Adaptec, and Grand Junction Networks (acquired by Cisco).

== Career ==
Prior to August Capital, Marquardt was a co-founder of Technology Venture Investors (TVI) in 1980 where he was involved in four highly successful funds that invested in more than 100 start-up and emerging growth companies. Among these early investments was Microsoft, where TVI was the sole investor and where Marquardt served on the board of directors from 1981 until 2014. However, Microsoft did not need the venture capital investment and took on TVI in preparation for going public.

Marquardt has been involved in every phase of the entrepreneurial process from seed investments to classic venture financings, mergers & acquisitions, public offerings and restructuring & privatizations.

Marquardt began his venture career at Institutional Venture Associates, where he spent a year after graduating from business school. Previously, he was a design engineer and development manager at Diablo Systems (acquired by Xerox) where he collaborated on and/or led various disk drive and printer programs.

Marquardt received a BSME from Columbia University in 1973 and an MBA from Stanford University in 1979. He also completed coursework for an MSEE at Stanford University. He has served as president of the Western Association of Venture Capitalists and is a past director of the National Venture Capital Association.

Marquardt is a Trustee of the Institute for Advanced Study in Princeton, New Jersey. He was ranked number 9 on the Forbes 2006 Midas List.
