= Alison Gass =

American curator

- Education: Columbia University (BA); New York University Institute of Fine Arts (MA)
- Occupation(s): Curator, museum director
- Organization: Institute of Contemporary Art San Francisco

Alison "Ali" Gass is an American curator and museum director. She is the founding director of the Institute of Contemporary Art San Francisco. She has served as the director of the Institute of Contemporary Art San José, Smart Museum of Art, and chief curator of the Cantor Arts Center at Stanford University.

== Biography ==
Gass is a native of the San Francisco Bay Area. She obtained her BA from Columbia University and MFA from the New York University Institute of Fine Arts.

Gass began her museum career as a curatorial assistant at the Jewish Museum in New York City, then as an assistant curator of painting and sculpture at San Francisco Museum of Modern Art. At SFMOMA, she curated SECA Art Award exhibitions and assisted with the organization of the Luc Tuymans retrospective. She was named a young curator to watch by The New York Times in 2010.

In 2012, she became deputy director and chief curator at the Eli and Edythe Broad Art Museum at Michigan State University. She helped launch the new building designed by Zaha Hadid and established a global contemporary program featuring artists such as Jessica Jackson Hutchins, Hope Gangloff, Teresita Fernandez, Sharon Hayes.

In 2014, Gass was named associate director for Collections, Exhibitions, and Curatorial Affairs at the Cantor Arts Center of Stanford University. She was chief curator at Stanford when she was appointed director of the University of Chicago's Smart Museum of Art in 2017, serving until 2019. She also taught at California College of the Arts and City College of New York.

Gass was named director of the Institute of Contemporary Art San José (ICA SJ) in 2020. In 2021, Gass joined the Institute of Contemporary Art San Francisco (ICA SF), an experimental, non-collecting museum featuring a range of temporary exhibitions, as its founding director. During the pandemic, she raised 2.5 million for the fledgling institution that is set to open in the fall of 2022.

== Personal life ==
Gass is married to architect Alec Hathaway. The couple has two children.
