= Dennis Oppenheim =

American artist, sculptor and photographer

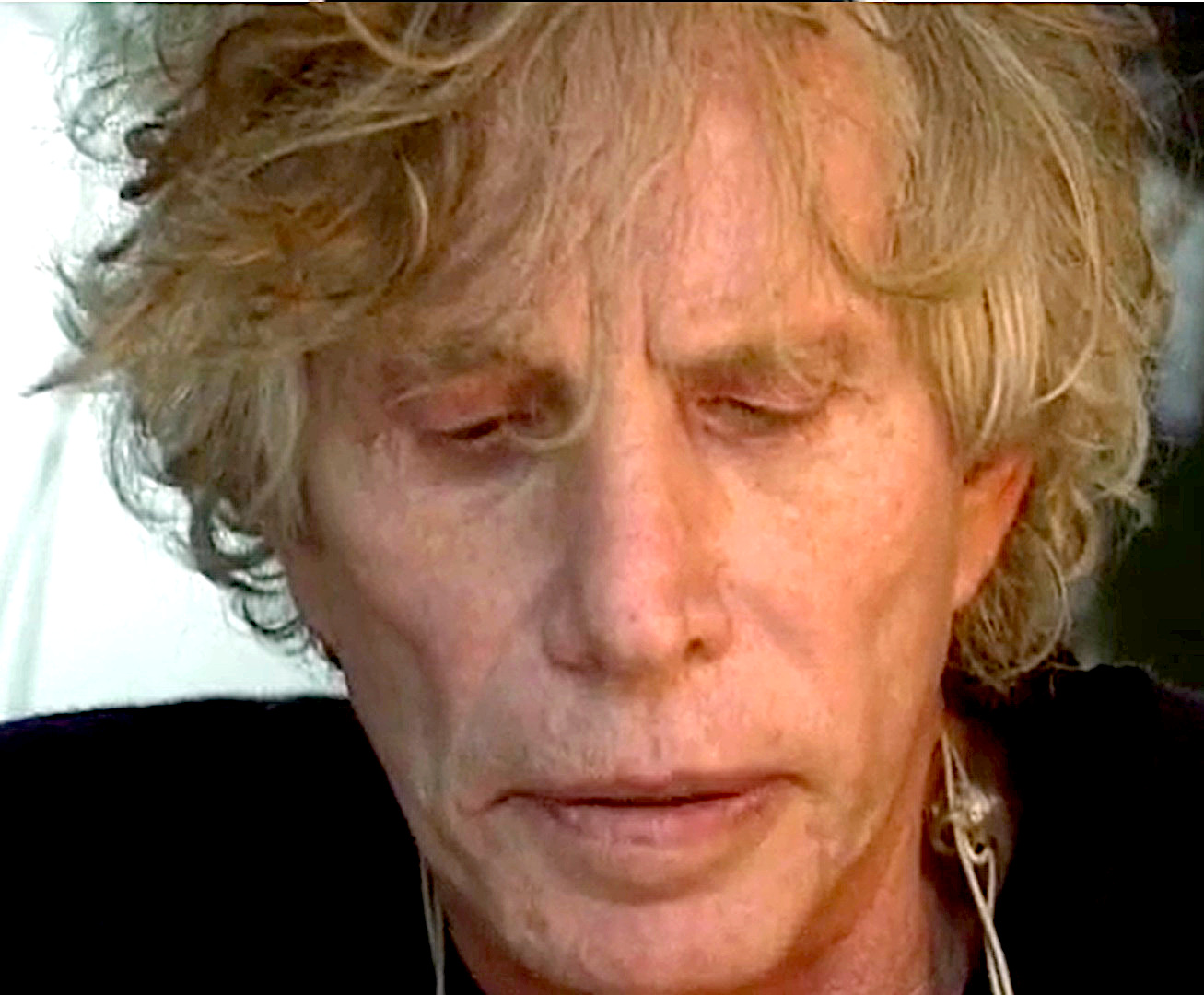
- Oppenheim in Speaking Portraits
- Born: September 6, 1938; Electric City, Washington, U.S.
- Died: January 21, 2011 (aged 72); New York City, U.S.
- Education: California College of Arts and Crafts, Stanford University
- Known for: Sculpture, performance art
- Movement: Conceptual art, environmental art
- Website: www.dennisoppenheim.org

Dennis Oppenheim (September 6, 1938 – January 21, 2011) was an American conceptual artist, performance artist, earth artist, sculptor and photographer.

Oppenheim's early artistic practice was an epistemological survey of art that responded to the strategies of the Minimalists that expanded to focus on site and context. His work progressed from perceptions of the physical properties of the gallery to the social and political context.

== Biography ==
Oppenheim's father was a Russian immigrant, and his mother was a native of California. He was born in Electric City, Washington, while his father was working as an engineer on the Grand Coulee Dam. Soon after, his family returned to their home in the San Francisco Bay area. Oppenheim attended Richmond High school.

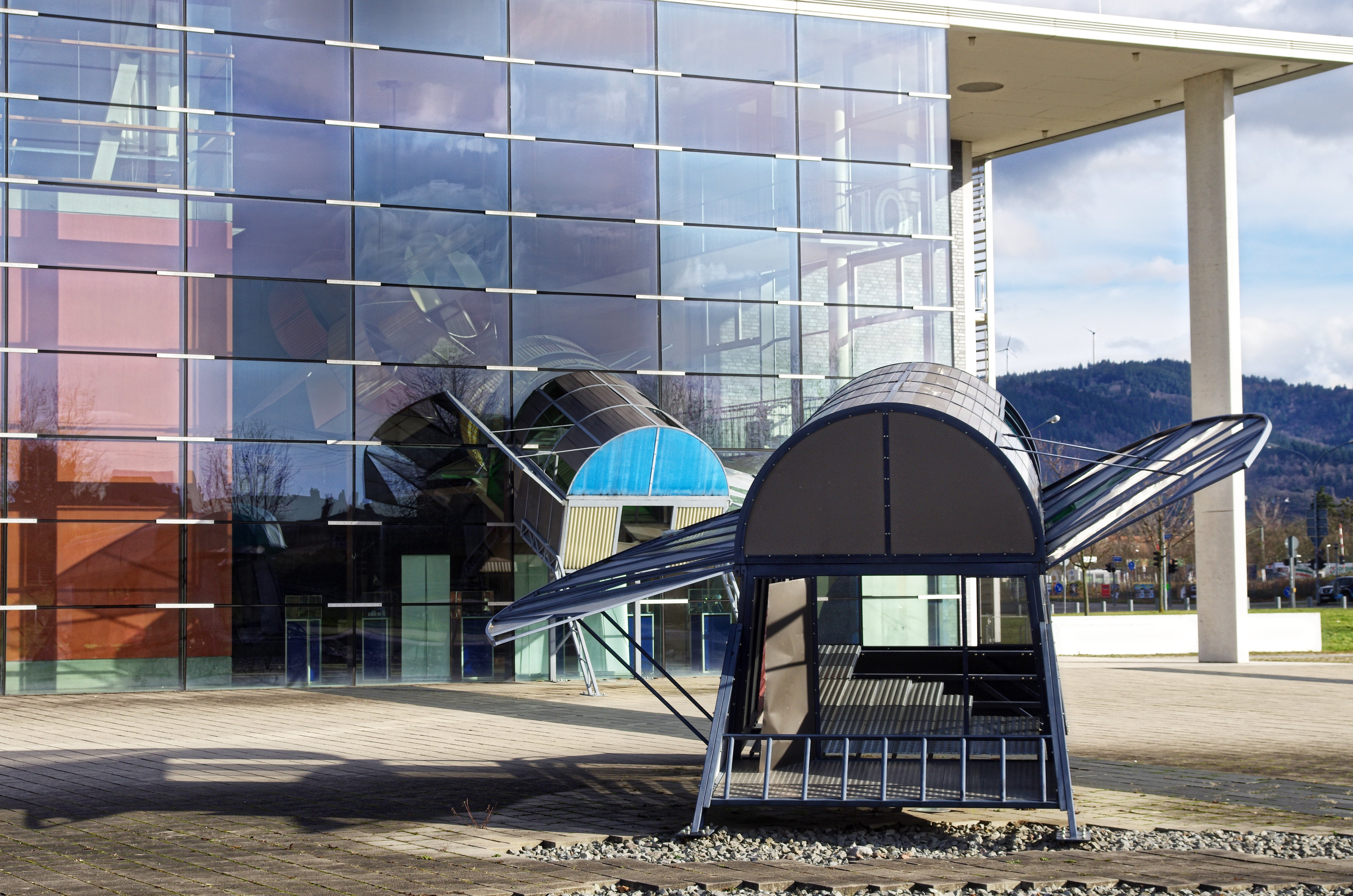
Jump and Twist (1999) sculpture by Dennis Oppenheim at the University of Freiburg, Microtechnology Building, Freiburg

He later attended the California College of Arts and Crafts, where he met his first wife, Karen Marie Cackett. Oppenheim and Cackett moved to Honolulu, where he taught at the University of Hawaii and they had their first child, Kristin, in 1959. In 1962 they had their second child, Erik. In 1964, he earned a Bachelor of Fine Arts degree from the California College of Arts and Crafts in Oakland and an MFA from Stanford University in Palo Alto in 1965. He moved to New York in 1966 and taught art at a nursery school in Northport and a junior high school in Smithtown, Long Island, while working toward his first one-person New York show in 1968 when he was 30 years old. His third child, Chandra, was born to Phyllis Jalbert that year. In 1972, Oppenheim was awarded a Guggenheim Fellowship for Fine Arts.

In 1981 he married the sculptor Alice Aycock who remained a close friend. In 1998 he married Amy Plumb and they remained married. Oppenheim occupied a live-work loft in Tribeca from 1967 until his death from cancer on January 21, 2011, aged 72.

== Work ==
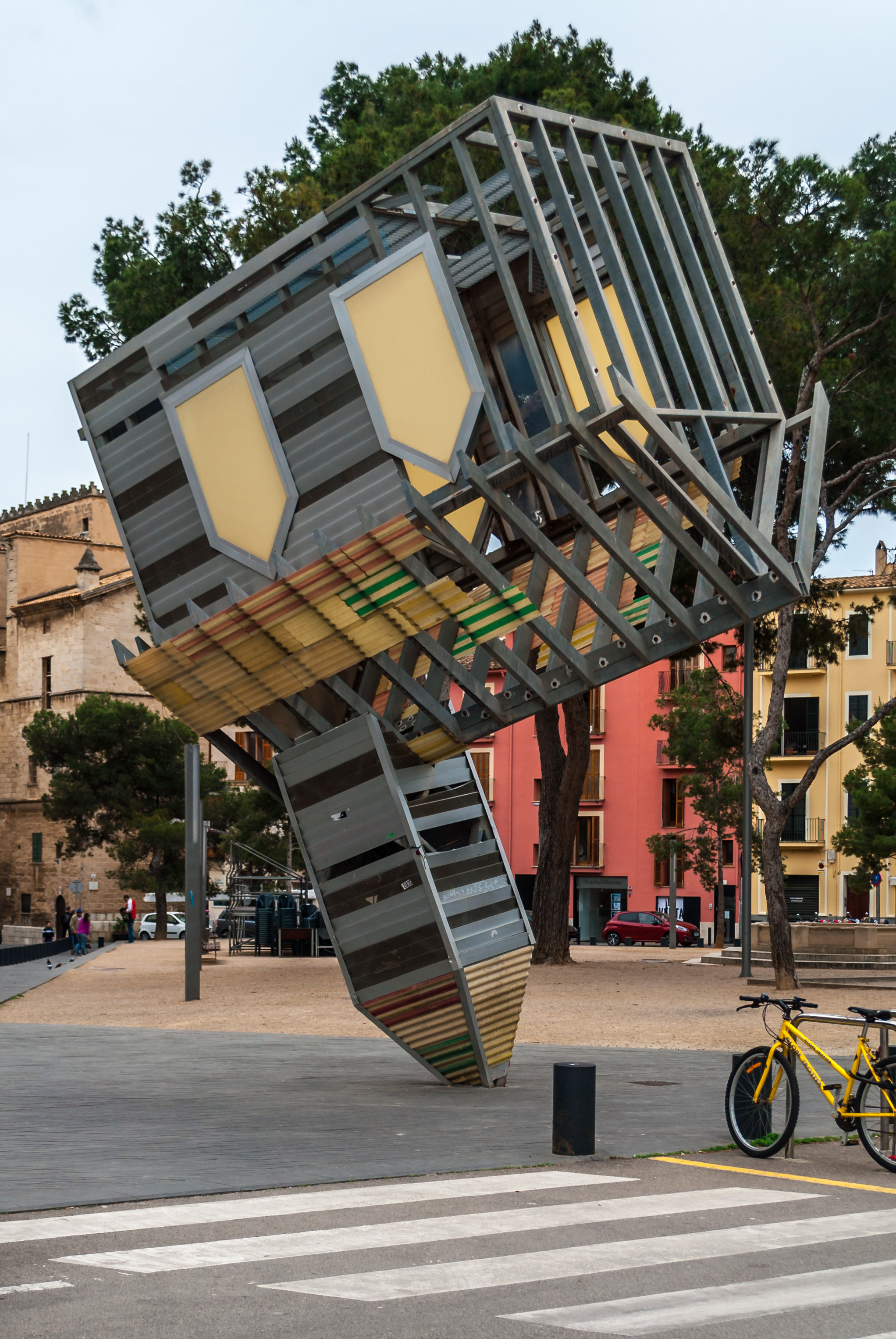
Device to Root Out Evil (1997) sculpture by Dennis Oppenheim at Palma de Mallorca, Plaça de la Porta de Santa Catalina

Conceptual works:
Executed in New York, Paris and Amsterdam and documented in photography, the series Indentations (1968) consisted of the removal of objects, exposing the impression of each object at that location. Viewing Stations (1967) were built as platforms for observing land vistas, suggesting an embodied notion of vision. The artist presents the base as the art itself, a viewer becomes an object to be looked at, a conceptual reversal.

Earthworks:
Social systems were overlaid on natural systems in Oppenheim's earthworks. In Annual Rings (1968) the schemata of lines depicting the annual growth of a tree was mapped by plowing snow on opposite sides of St. John's River, the boundary of the US and Canada. The earthwork relates geo-political boundaries, time zones, growth of the tree and entropic decay in a seminal site-specific work.

Body – performance works:
Oppenheim's body art grew out of his awareness of his own body when executing earthworks. In these works, the artist's body was both the subject and the object, providing the opportunity to work on a surface not exterior to the self, giving total control over the artwork. These body art actions were later assimilated into the canon of performance art. For Reading Position for Second Degree Burn (1970) Oppenheim lay on a beach for five hours with an open book on his chest, exposing himself to the sun. Oppenheim describes the piece as a corporeal enactment of painting, going on to state "I could feel the act of becoming red.".

Genetic works:
A series of works were made in collaboration with Oppenheim's children, whom he saw as extensions of himself. In a diptych titled 2- Stage Transfer Drawing. (Advancing to a Future State)., he makes a drawing on a wall at the same time that his son attempts to replicate the drawing on his father's back, a procedure reversed in 2- Stage Transfer Drawing. (Returning to a Past State). (1971) when he replicates the drawing on his son's back. Recorded in still photography, film and videotape, the performances were first exhibited as floor-to ceiling loop film projections. He also collaborated with his first wife in Forming Sounds (1972) and referred to his father, David Oppenheim, in the works Polarties (1972) and Identity Transfer (1970).

Film / video installations:
Oppenheim began to produce installation art in the early seventies. These works were often autobiographical. In Recall (1974), a video monitor is an installation component, positioned in front of a pan of turpentine. The monitor shows a close up of Oppenheim's mouth as he verbalizes a stream-of-consciousness monologue induced by the smell, on his experiences in art school in the fifties.

Post-performance- biographical works:
In a series of eight works Oppenheim called "post-performance," the artist spoke through his surrogate performance figures about the end of the avant-garde, his own art-making, in dialogue as opposites or as in Theme for a Major Hit (1974) acted under motorized control to a rock song with his lyrics, "It ain’t what you do, it’s what makes you do it," recorded by a band of Soho artists. Reflecting the underlying content of the post-modern, it is an "analysis of its own origins" with an "awareness of its vulnerability."

Machineworks:
In the early eighties, room size sculptural installations took the form of factories and machines to visualize the genesis of an artwork before it becomes form. Final Stroke- Project for a Glass Factory (1981) analogized thinking patterns as moving parts. Vacuum cleaners and powered heaters activated raw material through sieves, troughs, stacks and vents, as the stages of processing in the production of ideas. The machines became projection structures for fireworks, producing thought lines in the air, as in Newton Discovering Gravity (1984).

Sculpture:
While he continues to use sound, light and motion in the sculptural work in the late eighties, the imagery includes ordinary objects in different scales or as a collision of objects. In several works, animals appear. A group of taxidermy deer produce flames from the tips of their antlers, in Digestion. Gypsum Gypsies. (1989).

Public Sculpture:
Oppenheim experimented with titled and cantilevered form in Device to Root Out Evil (1997). Included as part of the Venice Biennale, it uses hand blown Venetian glass on the country church's roof and steeple. In 1999, a version using translucent corrugated fiberglass was installed as a permanent work in Palma de Mallorca. In the commissioned public work that followed, Oppenheim integrated the function of the building or the site in the work itself. Jump and Twist (1999) is an industrial, anthropologic work in three parts; on the plaza, through the facade of the building and suspended from the atrium's ceiling as translucent rotating form. The public work Light Chamber (2011) at the Justice Center in Denver, is an open room with translucent walls derived from the petals of many flowers.

== See also ==
- Engagement (sculpture)
- Radiant Fountains, Houston, Texas
- Still Dancing
- Formula compound, Fattoria di Celle- Collezione Gori, Pistoia
