= Lynn Basa =

American painter and public artist

- Born: 1954 (age 71–72)
- Known for: Painter, Author
- Website: lynnbasa.com

Lynn Basa (born 1954) is an American painter, sculptor public artist, and author living in Chicago Illinois. Basa attended Indiana University for her under graduate degree and University of Washington for her master's degree. She is best known as the author of the book The Artist's Guide to Public Art: How to Find and Win Commissions. Some of her permanent public art commissions include a mosaic for the CTA Argyle Station, a mosaic for the University of Wisconsin-Madison, and a mosaic for a new building for Salt Lake City's Ballet West. Basa taught sculpture at the School of the Art Institute of Chicago from 2006 to 2012.
