= Minnesota Street Project =

San Francisco art space

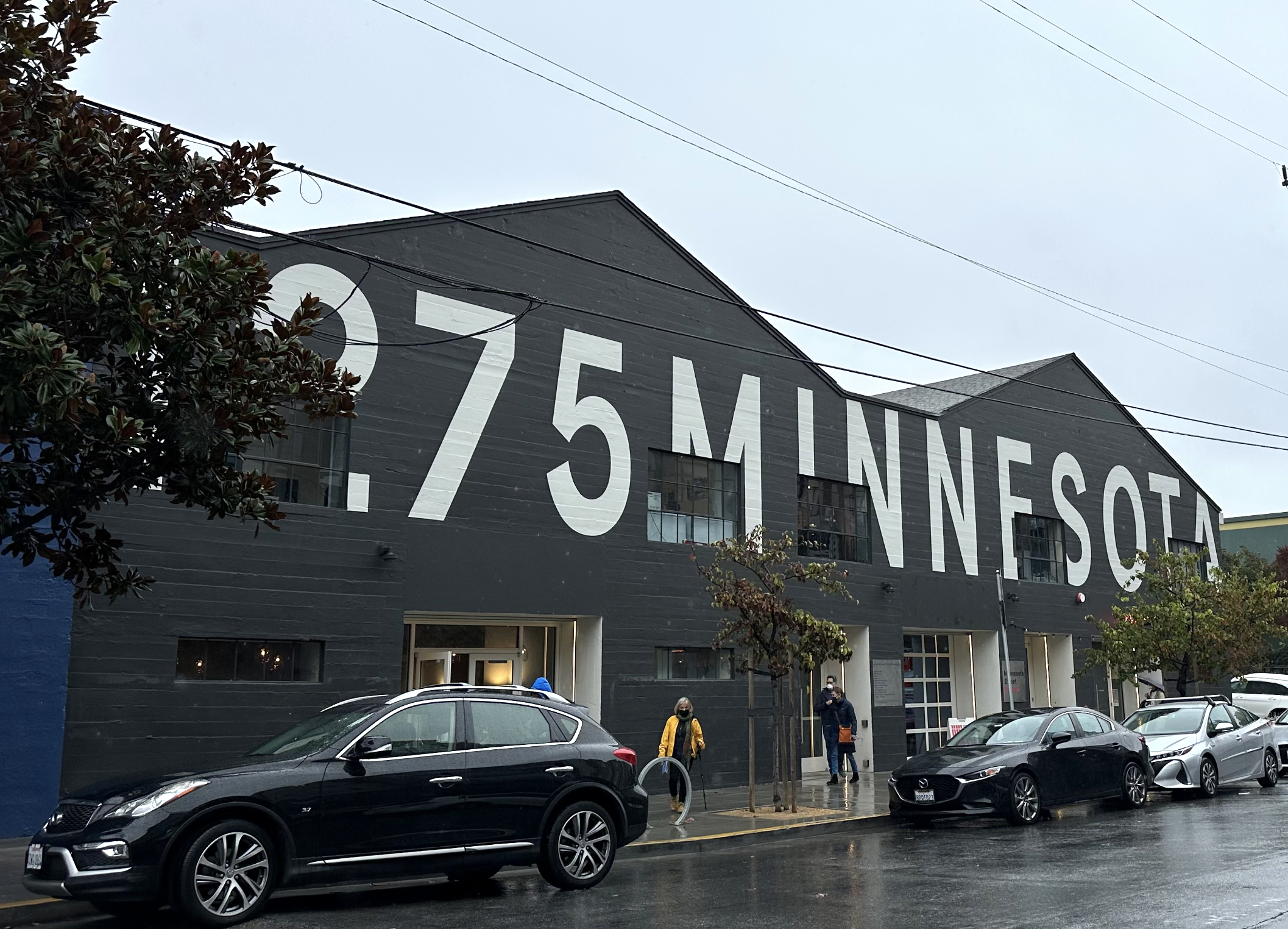
- Formation: 2016; 10 years ago
- Founder: Andy Rappaport and Deborah Rappaport
- Headquarters: 1275 Minnesota Street, San Francisco, California, U.S.
- Coordinates: 37.754719°N 122.389697°W
- Website: minnesotastreetproject.org

Minnesota Street Project (MSP), is a dual for-profit/foundation model art space founded in 2016 in the Dogpatch neighborhood of San Francisco, California; and features 13 art galleries, an event space, and a restaurant.

== History ==
Minnesota Street Project was founded in 2016 by venture capitalist Andy Rappaport, and Deborah Rappaport. The Minnesota Street Project Foundation (founded in 2019), and the California Black Voices Project and Grants for Arts Equity (founded in 2021), are two grant programs born from this project, created to “begin addressing the systemic racism in the art world”.

Minnesota Street Project is a three building complex, with 35,000 square feet of gallery space; they also offer subsidized art studio space at 1240 Minnesota Street (just across the street). The gallery space features an atrium, the building was designed by Jensen architects.

Galleries represented in the space have included Anglim/Trimble, Rena Bransten Gallery, bitforms gallery, Casemore Kirkeby, Adrian Rosenfeld, and Jack Fischer Gallery. The space has been the event host of the annual Fog Design + Art Fair, and the annual San Francisco Art Book Fair (launched in 2016).

== See also ==
- Institute of Contemporary Art San Francisco
