= August Capital =

American venture capital firm

August Capital Master Management Company, LLC
- Type: Venture fund
- Industry: Venture capital
- Founded: 1995; 31 years ago
- Founders: David Marquardt; John Johnston
- Headquarters: Menlo Park, California, U.S.
- Website: augustcap.com

August Capital, legally August Capital Master Management Company, LLC, is a venture capital firm founded by David Marquardt and John Johnston in 1995. It is focused on information technology and is based in Menlo Park, California.

== Company ==
August Capital was founded in 1995, and closed a first round of $100 million. They specialize in growth capital and startup investments. The firm has invested in all stages with a focus on early and late stage, management buyouts, and private investments in public equity. The firm has invested in the information technology spectrum including IT infrastructure, data center technologies, systems management, security, storage, and cloud computing systems and software.

Partner David Hornik, who joined in 2000, was on the Midas List in 2012. Other partners with the firm included Andy Rappaport.

Notable companies funded by August Capital include Seagate, Zulily, Splunk, Adaptive Telecom, which was sold to Metawave for $130 million, and Evite, which was acquired by Ticketmaster.
