= Dixie Friend Gay =

Dixie Friend Gay is a U.S. visual artist who works in a variety of media and is noted for work exploring the power of nature, particularly public art.

She was born as Dixie Friend in Oklahoma and raised on a cattle ranch. She taught art for three years at a rural school before moving to the East Coast. In 1989 she earned a Master's degree in Studio Arts from New York University. She was the 2003 Texas State Artist of the Year. As of 2015, she lives in Houston.

Her work is held in public collections including those of the Art Museum of Southeast Texas, The Grace Museum, Huntington Museum of Art, Museum of Fine Arts, Houston.

== Studio art ==
Gay has produced art in many different media. Through the years she has produced sculptures, prints, drawings, and paintings. On several occasions she has combined two or more of these in one piece. For example, several of her paintings contain sculptural elements, especially those made before 2003. Paintings made since 2003 lack sculptural components and feature warped landscapes. Of her sculpture, the Chrysalides, haunting hollow fiberglass figures, are the most prominent, reappearing in several forms over the years.

Exhibitions have included a solo exhibition, Moments in Nature: The Paintings of Dixie Friend Gay, in 2008 at the San Angelo Museum of Fine Arts, and a group exhibition, The Texas Aesthetic III: A Survey of Contemporary Texas Regionalism, in 2010 at William Greaves Fine Art.

== Public art ==
In February 2002 Gay completed a commission at George Bush Intercontinental Airport. The installation, Houston Bayou, comprises a glass mosaic mural on a 73-foot (22 m)-long serpentine wall, columns, and the terrazzo floor design. It was selected as one of the best public art installations in the United States by the national organization Americans for the Arts for its "Fresh Perspectives / Public Art Year in Review 2002". The installation also received "Craftsmanship Awards" from the Houston and the Regional Chapters of the Construction Specifications Institute in 2002.

Gay designed the central plaza for Sylvan Rodriguez Clear Lake Park. She designed a grove of 13 oaks, one for each cycle of the moon in the solar year. She created a labyrinth-paving pattern based on a one at Chartres Cathedral in France; and stone portals that mark the points on the horizon where the sun will rise and set on the winter and summer solstices. In preparation for the park, she researched astronomy, archeology and sacred geometry.

She has completed two installations for The Woodlands, Texas. In 2006 she designed a series of Byzantine glass mosaic murals to fit in the niches along a waterway. The murals contained examples of native flora and fauna. In 2008 she designed an installation called Treasures from Grandma's Purse, composed of a terrazzo floor with bronze and glass objects inserted in it.

In 2007 Gay completed an installation at the Port of Miami called Ephemeral Everglades. The baggage claim area features three dimensional prints of native flowers and butterflies. The entrance lobby has large ink on canvas prints depicting Everglades habitats.

In 2008 Gay completed a Byzantine mosaic mural at the Indianapolis International Airport called Autumn Prairie Morning. The mural features wildflowers and animals native to prairie land in the central United States.

Also in 2008 Gay completed a 25-foot-tall (7.6 m) metal spider called Arachnophilia. The spider is located in the Mueller development in Austin, Texas. The spider straddles a hike and bike trail. In 2015 she added Lake Nessy at Mueller Park.

In 2015 Gay installed The Great Heron at the Oso Bay Wetlands Preserve and Learning Center in Corpus Christi, Texas.

She completed a mural, The San Antonio River, for the Weston Centre (San Antonio).
