= Leamon Green =

American visual artist (born 1959)

- Born: 1959 (age 66–67); Anniston, Alabama
- Education: Temple University, Cleveland Institute of Art
- Known for: Visual art
- Spouse: Susan Wallace

Leamon Green (born 1959) is an American visual artist who works in different types of media.

== Biography ==
Green was born in 1959 in the town of Anniston, Alabama. His education includes a Master of Fine Arts at Temple University, Philadelphia (1985), a Bachelor of Fine Arts from the Cleveland Institute of Art, Ohio (1982) and a Studio Arts Degree from Concord College (1977–79). In 2007, he was awarded the Fulbright award to travel to Tanzania, where he lived and taught for a year.

He is currently an associate professor of the fine arts department at Texas Southern University in Houston. His wife is Susan Wallace, who taught Art History to 2015 Art History Bowl Texas State Champions Patrick Smith (Captain), Imran Hyder (Second Chair), Aditya Deshpande (Third Chair), and Leo Gao (Substitute).

Green's work is held in the collection of The Museum of Fine Arts, Houston.

== Solo exhibitions ==
- Leamon Green: Recent Work, Beeville Art Museum, virtual exhibition, 2020
- Is the Way Closed, Hooks-Epstein Galleries, Houston, Texas, 2017
- Look At Them, O'Kane Gallery, University of Houston Downtown, Houston, Texas, 2016
- Ancestral Legacies, Houston Baptist University, Houston, Texas, 2016
- Leamon Green, Hooks-Epstein Galleries, Houston, Texas, 2015
- What She Said, Hooks-Epstein Galleries, Houston, Texas, 2011
- Tug, Hooks-Epstein Galleries, Houston, Texas, 2009
- Made in Tanzania, New Artwork, Alliance Francaise, Dar es Salaam, Tanzania, 2008
- Embrace, Hooks-Epstein Galleries, Houston, Texas, 2005
- Lock + Key, Hooks-Epstein Galleries, Houston, Texas, 2004
- Ancestral Images, Galveston Arts Center, Galveston, Texas, 2003
- Portraits or Objects, Thomas & Hall Fine Art, Dallas, Texas, 2003
- Leamon Green, College of the Mainland, Texas City, Texas, 2002
- Step into the Footsteps of Your Ancestors, University Museum, Texas Southern University, Houston, Texas, 2001
- Leamon Green, Kathleen Coleman Gallery, Houston, Texas, 2000
- Leamon Green: Works on Paper, Richland College, Dallas, Texas, 1999
- Lay it On, MD Modern, Houston, Texas, 1999
- Hear What They Do Not Say, African American Museum, Dallas, Texas, 1998
- Patterns, Visual Arts Gallery, Memorial Student Center, Texas A&M University, College Station, Texas, 1997
- This Time Around, Barnes Blackman Gallery, Houston, Texas, 1996

== Selected group exhibitions ==
- Miniatures, Hooks-Epstein Galleries, Houston, 2003
- Circle of Friends, Artscan Gallery, Houston, 2002
