= List of airlines of Texas =

Airline firms with certificated air carriers, headquartered, directed and operated from Texas

The following is a list of individual passenger, charter, and cargo airlines - U.S. Federal Aviation Administration (FAA) United States Department of Transportation (DOT) Certificated airlines, their parent company firms, consortium firms, private equity firms, or other business operating schemes, doing business as airlines, and headquartered, directed, operated and based within the U.S. State of Texas

== List of firms headquartered in the state of Texas ==
=== Passenger airlines ===
- Southwest Airlines, Dallas Love Field, Love Field area of Dallas, Texas

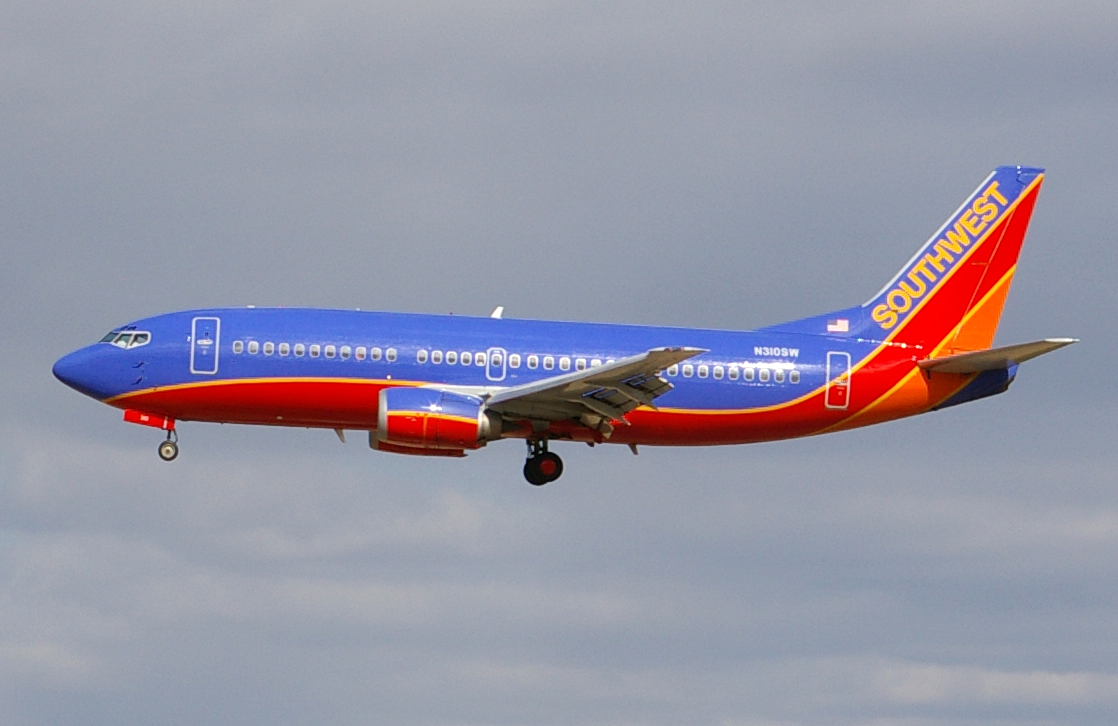

- American Airlines, Dallas/Fort Worth International Airport, Irving, Texas area of Dallas, Texas
- Avelo Airlines, Hollywood Burbank Airport, Burbank, California area of Greater Los Angeles, headquartered in Houston, Texas

=== Cargo and charter airlines ===
- Ameristar Air Cargo, Addison Airport
- Ameristar Jet Charter, Dallas, Texas
- Berry Aviation, San Marcos Municipal Airport, San Marcos, Texas
- C&M Airways, El Paso International Airport, El Paso, Texas (cargo)
- Flexjet (a.k.a. Bombardier Flexjet), Dallas, Texas (Fractional)
- Jet Solutions, L.L.C., Richardson, Texas Operates Flexjet 25 fleet.
- JSX (Formerly JetSuiteX), Dallas Love Field, Love Field area of Dallas, Texas
- Martinaire, Addison Airport, Addison, Texas

=== Firms doing business as airlines through investment holdings in DOT/FAA certificated air carriers ===
American Airlines Group, Fort Worth, Texas commercial aviation business and airline holding company

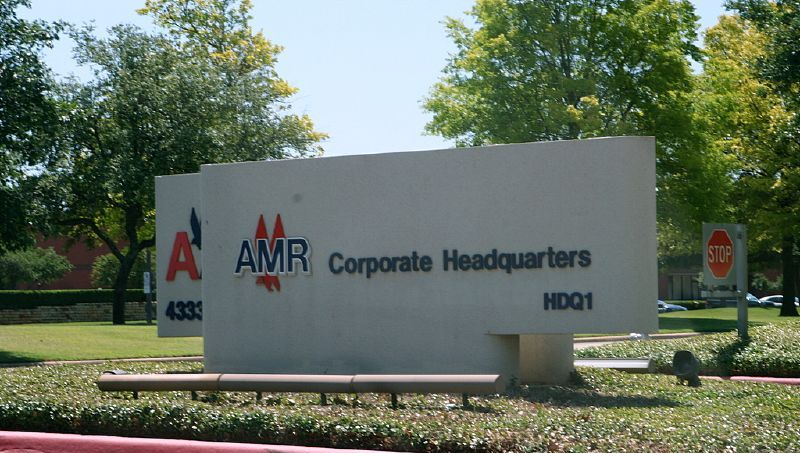

- American Airlines
- Envoy Air, Fort Worth, Texas
- Piedmont Airlines
- PSA Airlines
- US Airways

Note: American Airlines Group also controls the brand AmericanConnection along with the former certificated airline TWA Airlines LLC, (formerly Trans World Airlines)

== List of defunct or merged carriers/firms - headquartered in Texas, but no longer in business ==
The following is a list of Air Transportation Firms certificated as FAA/DOT Certificated air carriers or doing business as similar type firms in which their primary business is an FAA/DOT Certificated Air Carrier in the conduct of commerce, based and headquartered directed from Texas. This basing and headquarter directing from Texas may be due to business acquisitions, mergers, or buyouts by; airline parent companies, airline holding companies, consortiums, private equity firms, or other strategic investment business schemes, which leave the FAA / DOT airlines air carrier operating certificate with a Texas-based firm.

=== Former certificated air transportation firms, headquartered in Texas ===
- Air Alaska Pan Am Air Bridge
- AirCal
- Air Texas (1968-1970) Fort Worth Meacham International Airport to Austin and Houston
- Amistad Airlines from Del Rio
- ATA Airlines
- Austin Express, (Robert Mueller Municipal Airport then Austin Bergstrom International Airport, Austin, Texas
- Bar Harbor Airlines originally at Bar Harbor Airport, Trenton, Maine then Houston, Texas.
- Braniff International Airways, Grapevine, Texas then Dallas, Texas
- Business Express Airlines
- Central Airlines, Fort Worth, Texas
- Conquest Airlines, Robert Mueller Municipal Airport, Austin, Texas
- Continental Airlines
- Continental Micronesia
- Dal Airways
- Dallas Express Airlines
- Davis Airlines
- Eagle Airlines
- Emerald Air, Austin, Texas (Bia Cor Holdings Inc., acquired Emerald Air and changed its name to "Braniff III".)
- Essair
- Fort Worth Airlines
- Hood Airways
- Kitty Hawk Airways
- Kitty Hawk Aircargo, Dallas-Fort Worth International Airport
- Legend Airlines, Love Field, Dallas, Texas,
- Lone Star Airlines (1960)
- Midway Aviation
- Muse Air, Houston, Texas (became TranStar Airlines)
- Pacific Air Holdings, Dallas, Texas, airline holding company
  - Pacific Wings, Dallas, Texas,(commuter airline and operates flights in Hawaii) operates the following brands of the certificated air carrier Pacific Wings which provide Essential Air Services to many small communities through federally subsidized contracts;
  - GeorgiaSkies, Dallas, Texas (commuter airline which operates flights in Georgia)
  - KentuckySkies, Dallas, Texas (commuter airline which operates flights in Kentucky)
  - New Mexico Airlines, Dallas, Texas (commuter airline which operates flights in New Mexico and West Texas)
  - TennesseeSkies, Dallas, Texas (commuter airline which operates flights in Tennessee.
- Permian Airlines from Midland to S.A., Del Rio** Reno Air
- Rio Airways, Killeen, Texas** Tejas Airlines (1979–80) Fort Worth Meacham International Airport to Austin, Houston, Corpus Christi, San Antonio, and Laredo ** Texas Star Airlines
- TranStar Airlines, Houston, Texas
- Trans-Texas Airways
- Trans World Airlines
- UltraAir
- Wise Airlines from Del Rio to S.A.
- Valiant Airways, Houston, Texas (defunct and never started operations)

=== Firms with certificated carrier holdings, headquartered in Texas, but no longer in business ===
- Dalfort Corporation d/b/a
  - Braniff Inc. Dallas, Texas then Orlando, Florida. (partially formed from the assets of Braniff International Airways)
- Exec Express II Inc., d/b/a
  - Aspen Mountain Air/Lone Star Airlines Stillwater, Oklahoma then Fort Worth, Texas
- ExpressJet Holdings
  - ExpressJet Airlines (prior to acquisition by SkyWest Inc.)
- Metro Airlines, Houston, Texas then Dallas-Fort Worth International Airport then Grapevine, Texas (evolved into an airline holding firm with the acquisition of a number of different airlines)
  - (SS) Air Northeast (Brockway Air), (OY) Aviation Associates (Sunaire), (FH) Chaparral Airlines, (FY) Metro Airlines, (FY) (Metro Airlines) Metro Express II, (HY) Metroflight (Metroflight)
- Texas Air Corporation
  - Bar Harbor Airlines, Britt Airways, People Express, Provincetown-Boston Airlines, Rocky Mountain Airways, Texas International Airlines, Eastern Air Lines, Frontier Airlines (1950-1986), New York Air

== See also ==
- List of airlines in Alaska
- List of airlines in Hawaii
