= Air L.A. =

US-american commuter airline (1982–1995)

IATA	ICAO	Call sign
UE	UED	—
- Commenced operations: May 1982; 44 years ago
- Ceased operations: September 1995; 30 years ago
- Hubs: Los Angeles International Airport
- Subsidiaries: Conquest Airlines
- Parent company: Air L.A. Inc
- Headquarters: Westchester, Los Angeles, California, United States
- Key people: Wayne Schoenfeld; Ken Dickey; Bill Wolf

Air L.A., a wholly owned subsidiary of Air L.A. Inc (NASDAQ: AILA) was a U.S. commuter airline headquartered in the Westchester area of Los Angeles, California. It was founded by Wayne Schoenfeld, Ken Dickey and Bill Wolf. It discontinued operations in California in May, 1995. It ceased all operations in September 1995.

== 1980s ==
Air LA started life as a charter airline in the late 1970s. It first started scheduled operations using Piper Chieftain aircraft in May 1982. It served Blythe, Burbank, Grand Canyon and Las Vegas. It gradually expanded its network to take in Bermuda Dunes/Palm Desert, Bullhead City (AZ)/Laughlin (NV), Ontario (CA) and Las Vegas and by the late 1980s was operating British Aerospace BAe Jetstream 31 commuter propjets.

== 1990s ==
In November 1990, Air L.A. added Mexico service through the acquisition of Air Resorts, another southern California-based commuter airline.

In April 1993, it had the distinction of entering into one of the first international codeshare agreements with Aeromexico. The relationship began initially on the Los Angeles to Tijuana route and expanded to another of other Mexican cities primarily out of Tijuana and Hermosillo. The airline bought Conquest Airlines in 1995. In early 1995 Air L.A. also bought St. Paul, MN based Capitol Air (Not to be confused with the Capitol Air that operated jets, the Saint Paul-based Capitol Air was a small commuter that served primarily Chicago Midway and Milwaukee from the St. Paul Downtown airport between mid-December 1993 and December 31, 1994). In 1993, the airline operated a fleet of Fairchild Swearingen Metroliners, seating 19 passengers.

It served the following California cities: Los Angeles, San Diego, Ontario, Bakersfield, Fresno, Stockton and Monterey. In Arizona, it served Phoenix. In Nevada, it served Las Vegas.

The airline also served two states in Mexico. In Baja California, it served Tijuana, Ensenada, Mexicali and San Felipe. In Sonora, it served Hermosillo.

The airline also furnished "air technical assistance" to the television show Wings (1990 TV series) during their 1990 and 1991 seasons.

== Destinations in 1989 ==
Air LA was serving the following destinations in 1989 with scheduled passenger flights operated with British Aerospace BAe Jetstream 31 turboprop aircraft:

- Bullhead City, AZ (BHC)
- Grand Canyon National Park Airport, AZ (GCN)
- Las Vegas, NV (LAS)
- Ontario, CA (ONT)
- Palm Desert, CA (UDD) - served via Bermuda Dunes Airport

== Destinations in 1995 ==
Air LA was serving the following destinations in 1995 with scheduled passenger flights operated with Fairchild Swearingen Metroliner turboprop aircraft:

- Bakersfield, CA (BFL)
- Fresno, CA (FAT)
- Hermosillo, Mexico (HMO)
- Las Vegas, NV (LAS)
- Los Angeles, CA (LAX)
- Phoenix, AZ (PHX)
- Stockton, CA (SCK)
- Tijuana, Mexico (TIJ)

== Fleet ==
Air LA operated the following aircraft types during its existence:

- British Aerospace BAe Jetstream 31
- Cessna 402
- Embraer EMB-110 Bandeirante
- Fairchild Swearingen Metroliner
- Piper Chieftain

== See also ==
- List of defunct airlines of the United States
