= KRYS-FM =

Radio station in Corpus Christi, Texas

Corpus Christi, Texas; United States
- Broadcast area: Corpus Christi area
- Frequency: 99.1 MHz
- Branding: 99.1 K-99 Country

Programming
- Format: Country
- Affiliations: Premiere Networks

Ownership
- Owner: iHeartMedia; (iHM Licenses, LLC)
- Sister stations: KKTX, KMXR, KNCN, KSAB, KUNO

History
- First air date: December 1982
- Former call signs: KBCB (1981–1984)
- Call sign meaning: KRYS = Christi

Technical information
- Licensing authority: FCC
- Facility ID: 55162
- Class: C1
- ERP: 100,000 watts
- HAAT: 284.0 meters (931.8 ft)
- Transmitter coordinates: 27°45′7.00″N 97°38′17.00″W

Links
- Public license information: Public file; LMS
- Webcast: Listen Live
- Website: k99country.iheart.com

KRYS-FM (99.1 MHz) is a radio station broadcasting a country music format. Licensed to Corpus Christi, Texas, United States, the station serves the Corpus Christi area. The station is currently owned by iHeartMedia and features programming from Premiere Networks. The station's studios and offices are located on Old Brownsville Road in Corpus Christi (near the airport), and its transmitter tower is located in Robstown, Texas.

== History ==
K-99 has been a country formatted station since December 1982. K-99's original call letters were KBCB-FM (1982–84). KRYS was originally KRIS radio 1360 AM, until it was sold in 1956 and changed to KRYS. 1360 AM is now KKTX. The station went on the air as KBCB on January 5, 1981. On August 20, 1984, the station changed its call sign to the current KRYS-FM.

Prior to becoming KKTX-FM, KRYS-AM facilities were located on South Staples across from one of Corpus Christi's first shopping centers - Parkdale Plaza. The station manager was Ace Lloyd and the station was owned by an oil company in San Antonio that had at least one other radio station in the South Texas market. Between 1967–1969, on-air personality J Gordan Lunn, who later became the weatherman on KMID-TV in the Midland-Odessa market, air staff also included P.D. Joe P. Etheridge, Johnny Marks, Hank Hammer, Gil Garcia ( Air Name Gil Moore). Jim Springer was the sales' manager and George Dismukes and Bill Scott made up the sales' staff. The news director was Bud Little, who later moved to San Antonio and became the news director for WOAI. In the early 70s, the station moved to a new location, and Jim Springer became the station manager. Salesmen were Brady Malone and Bill Scott.

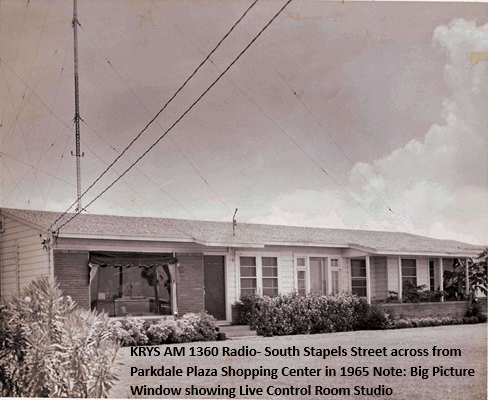
