= KMXR =

Corpus Christi, Texas; United States
- Broadcast area: Corpus Christi metropolitan area
- Frequency: 93.9 MHz
- Branding: Big 93.9

Programming
- Format: Classic hits
- Affiliations: Premiere Networks

Ownership
- Owner: iHeartMedia; (iHM Licenses, LLC)
- Sister stations: KKTX, KNCN, KRYS-FM, KSAB, KUNO

History
- First air date: January 1970
- Former call signs: KSIX-FM (1970–1980); KEXX (1980–1985); KSTE (1985–1989)

Technical information
- Licensing authority: FCC
- Facility ID: 55163
- Class: C1
- ERP: 100,000 watts
- HAAT: 284 meters (932 ft)
- Transmitter coordinates: 27°45′7.00″N 97°38′17.00″W

Links
- Public license information: Public file; LMS
- Webcast: Listen live (via iHeartRadio)
- Website: big939.iheart.com

KMXR (93.9 FM, "Big 93.9") is a commercial radio station licensed to Corpus Christi, Texas. It broadcasts a classic hits format and is owned by iHeartMedia, Inc. The studios and offices are on Old Brownsville Road near the Corpus Christi International Airport.

KMXR's transmitter is sited on County Road 37 at County Road 64 in Robstown, Texas.

== History ==
In the late 1960s, the station got its construction permit and was built by Col. Vann M. Kennedy, a pioneer Texas broadcaster. Kennedy was perhaps best known for giving Walter Cronkite his first job in news while Cronkite attended the University of Texas in Austin. As Cronkite later described it, he thanked Kennedy for "teaching me to write." Kennedy also built KZTV Channel 10 in Corpus Christi, and KVTV Channel 13 in Laredo.

In September 1947, Kennedy put KSIX 1230 AM on the air, the third station in Corpus Christi. He added an FM station in January 1970. Its original call sign was KSIX-FM. It aired a mostly automated beautiful music format. It played quarter-hour sweeps of soft, instrumental music, with Broadway and Hollywood show tunes.

The call letters changed to KEXX when the station flipped to adult contemporary music in 1980. The station was assigned the call letters KSTE on December 2, 1985, upon its sale to American Wireless Company. KSTE also offered an adult contemporary format.

On April 1, 1989, the station changed its call sign to the current KMXR. It began playing classic hits.

On December 26, 2014, KMXR rebranded as "Big 93.9".
