= KNCN =

- Sinton, Texas; United States
- Broadcast area: Corpus Christi metropolitan area
- Frequency: 101.3 MHz
- Branding: C101 Rocks

Programming
- Format: Active rock
- Affiliations: Compass Media Networks

Ownership
- Owner: iHeartMedia, Inc.; (iHM Licenses, LLC)
- Sister stations: KKTX, KMXR, KRYS-FM, KSAB, KUNO

History
- First air date: July 1, 1972
- Former call signs: KMIO (1972–1976)

Technical information
- Licensing authority: FCC
- Facility ID: 67186
- Class: C1
- ERP: 100,000 watts
- HAAT: 110 meters (360 ft)
- Transmitter coordinates: 27°55′24.00″N 97°25′26.00″W

Links
- Public license information: Public file; LMS
- Webcast: Listen live (via iHeartRadio)
- Website: c101.iheart.com

KNCN (101.3 FM, "C101") is a commercial radio station licensed to Sinton, Texas, United States, and serving the Corpus Christi metropolitan area. Owned by iHeartMedia, it airs an active rock format with studios located on Old Brownsville Road near the Corpus Christi International Airport.

KNCN's transmitter is sited on FM 3161 at FM 1306 in Taft, a community in San Patricio County.

== History ==
The station signed on the air on July 1, 1972, as KMIO. It broadcast from a combined studio and tower site north of Corpus Christi Bay and east of Sinton. It used the same tower and power as now, which is a 100,000-watt signal from a 410-foot antenna.

The site had on-air studios, a bathroom, and the transmitter room. The first main transmitter was a Collins 831-G1. In 1976, it switched to a progressive rock format, the first commercial FM rock station in Corpus Christi. That was coupled with a change in call letters to KNCN.

It was sold to Tippie Communications whose shareholders had been involved with KHFI-AM-FM-TV in Austin, with Rollins/Terminix. By the 1980s, it was co-owned with KVLY-FM in Edinburg, Texas. At that point, it moved to a more formatted album rock sound, playing the top tracks from the biggest selling rock albums. In the 2000s, the station switched to the active rock panel per Mediabase.

In later years, sales offices were established in the business center of Corpus Christi. They were once in the "600 Building" downtown, and later had their own building on Leopard Street. Early on, the station received permission from the FCC to use "Sinton-Taft" in its station identification. A bit later, KNCN changed that to "Sinton-Corpus Christi" to identify its city of license.

Morning show hosts have included Greg and LJ, Ray Lytle and Jon Lamb, Tim and Rex "Two Guys in the Morning". Hannah Storm of ESPN had a brief stint as a C-101 DJ in the early 1980s.
