= KKTX (AM) =

Coordinates: 27°48′01″N 97°27′41″W

- Corpus Christi, Texas; United States
- Broadcast area: Corpus Christi metropolitan area
- Frequency: 1360 kHz
- Branding: NewsRadio 1360 KKTX

Programming
- Format: Talk radio
- Network: Fox News Radio
- Affiliations: Premiere Networks; Compass Media Networks; Dallas Cowboys Radio Network

Ownership
- Owner: iHeartMedia; (iHM Licenses, LLC)
- Sister stations: KMXR; KNCN; KRYS-FM; KSAB; KUNO

History
- First air date: 1929; 97 years ago
- Former call signs: KGFI (1929–1936); KRIS (1936–1956); KRYS (1956–2002)
- Call sign meaning: Kilgore, Texas (calls loaned from former FM sister station)

Technical information
- Licensing authority: FCC
- Facility ID: 55166
- Class: B
- Power: 1,000 watts (unlimited)

Links
- Public license information: Public file; LMS
- Webcast: Listen live (via iHeartRadio)
- Website: 1360kktx.iheart.com

KKTX (1360 kHz) is a commercial AM radio station in Corpus Christi, Texas. It airs a talk radio format and is owned by iHeartMedia. The studios and offices on Old Brownsville Road near the Corpus Christi International Airport.

KKTX is powered at 1,000 watts using a non-directional antenna. The transmitter is on McBride Lane at Erin Drive.

== Programming ==
Most of KKTX's weekday schedule is nationally syndicated talk shows. Weekdays begin with This Morning, America's First News with Gordon Deal. That's followed by Walton & Johnson with Steve Johnson and Kenny Webster (from co-owned KPRC Houston), The Glenn Beck Radio Program, The Clay Travis and Buck Sexton Show, The Sean Hannity Show, The Joe Pags Show (from co-owned WOAI San Antonio), The Jesse Kelly Show and Coast to Coast AM with George Noory.

Weekend shows include Bill Handel on the Law, Armstrong & Getty, Rich DeMuro on Tech, The Weekend with Michael Brown, The Kim Komando Show, Gun Talk with Bill Gresham, The Mark Moss Show, The Great Outdoors with Ken Milam and Sunday Night with Bill Cunningham. During the NFL season, KKTX carries Dallas Cowboys games. Most hours begin with an update from Fox News Radio.

== History ==
The station signed on in 1929, as KGFI. It is the oldest station in Corpus Christi and was first owned by the Corpus Christi Caller-Times daily newspaper. The call sign became KRIS in 1936, and KRYS in 1956.

On November 10, 1997, KRYS became an affiliate of Radio Disney.

Blake Farenthold, a Republican who began representing Corpus Christi in the United States House of Representatives for Texas's 27th congressional district in 2011, co-hosted Lago in the Morning on KKTX from 1997 to 2010.

Jim Lago retired from hosting the KKTX morning show in December 2019. The 74-year-old Lago hosted his last show on KKTX on December 6, 2019.
