= KUNO (AM) =

Corpus Christi, Texas; United States
- Frequency: 1400 kHz
- Branding: El Patron

Programming
- Format: Regional Mexican

Ownership
- Owner: iHeartMedia, Inc.; (iHM Licenses, LLC)
- Sister stations: KKTX, KMXR, KNCN, KRYS-FM, KSAB

History
- First air date: 1993
- Call sign meaning: UNO = Spanish for number one

Technical information
- Licensing authority: FCC
- Facility ID: 33777
- Class: C
- Power: 1,000 watts
- Transmitter coordinates: 27°45′36.00″N 97°26′14.00″W

Links
- Public license information: Public file; LMS
- Webcast: KUNO Livestream
- Website: Official website

KUNO (1400 AM, El Patron) is a radio station broadcasting a Regional Mexican music format. Licensed to Corpus Christi, Texas, United States. The station is currently owned by iHeartMedia, Inc. The station's studios and offices are located on Old Brownsville Road in Corpus Christi (near the airport, and its transmitter tower is located in the Central City part of the city.
