= UDD =

UDD may refer to:

== Science and technology ==
- Ultra-dense deuterium
- Neutrons, which have quark configurations of udd, or up-down-down
- Ultradisperse diamond, another name for Detonation nanodiamond
- Urine-diversion dehydration toilet
- User driven development

== Others ==
- Uniform Distribution of Deaths, an assumption used in building actuarial life tables
- Bermuda Dunes Airport
- UDD, the station code for the Uddingston railway station in Uddingston, Scotland
- United Front for Democracy Against Dictatorship, a political movement in Thailand
- Universidad del Desarrollo private university in Chile
- UDD (band), a Filipino band
