= KSAB =

Robstown, Texas; United States
- Broadcast area: Corpus Christi metropolitan area
- Frequency: 99.9 MHz
- Branding: Tejano 99.9

Programming
- Format: Tejano music

Ownership
- Owner: iHeartMedia, Inc.; (iHM Licenses, LLC)
- Sister stations: KKTX, KMXR, KNCN, KRYS-FM, KUNO

History
- First air date: October 13, 1966
- Former call signs: KROB-FM (1978–1991)

Technical information
- Licensing authority: FCC
- Facility ID: 33776
- Class: C1
- ERP: 100,000 watts
- HAAT: 284 meters (932 ft)
- Transmitter coordinates: 27°45′7.00″N 97°38′17.00″W

Links
- Public license information: Public file; LMS
- Webcast: Listen live (via iHeartRadio)
- Website: ksabfm.com

KSAB (99.9 FM, Tejano 99.9) is a commercial radio station licensed to Robstown, Texas, United States, and serves the Corpus Christi metropolitan area. Owned by iHeartMedia, Inc., it broadcasts a Tejano music format. The studios are on Old Brownsville Road near Corpus Christi International Airport.

The transmitter tower is off County Road 67 in Robstown.

== History ==
The station signed on the air on October 13, 1966. Its original call sign was KROB-FM, the sister station to KROB 1510 AM. The two stations had simulcast a country music format. They were owned by Coastal Bend Broadcasting.

On July 11, 1991, the station changed its call letters to the current KSAB. It switched to a Tejano music format, separate from its AM sister station.

San Antonio-based Clear Channel Communications acquired the station in 2000. In 2014, Clear Channel changed its name to the current iHeartMedia. KSAB Tejano 99.9 broadcasts online via the iHeartRadio app.
