= Austin Express =

American airline

IATA	ICAO	Call sign
7V	TXX	COWBOY
- Founded: August 13, 1997; 29 years ago
- Ceased operations: December 31, 2000; 25 years ago
- Operating bases: Robert Mueller Municipal Airport; Austin Bergstrom International Airport
- Fleet size: 4
- Headquarters: Austin, Texas, United States

Austin Express Inc. was a commuter airline headquartered in Austin, Texas, United States. The airline incorporated on August 13, 1997. It was originally managed by ten former Conquest Airlines executives. All of the owners and key personnel of Austin Express were formerly employed by Conquest which had also been based in Austin. Bradfield Martino, Austin was the first ad agency to advertise the airline and a New York Times article stated that the resulting ad account billings were estimated at over one million dollars. Its operations began on January 5, 1998, with a small fleet of Fairchild Swearingen Metro III propjets.

The airline operated out of Robert Mueller Municipal Airport before moving all operations to Austin Bergstrom International Airport following the closure of Mueller. The cover of the March 18, 2000 Austin Express system timetable stated the airline was offering daily flights between the Texas cities of Austin (AUS), Beaumont/Port Arthur (BPT) and Tyler (TYR). In July 2000, Austin Express launched four nonstop flights a day between Austin and Corpus Christi, a 55-minute flight operated with Metro III aircraft, while continuing its existing Austin–Tyler service. By the time scheduled service ended on December 31, 2000, its remaining commuter routes were those to Tyler and Corpus Christi. The airline ended scheduled passenger flights on Sunday, December 31, 2000, and then became a charter air carrier.

== Destinations ==
At various points between 1998 and 2000, Austin Express served the following Texas cities:

- Austin (hub)
- Beaumont/Port Arthur
- Corpus Christi
- Tyler

== See also ==
- List of defunct airlines of the United States
