= KROB =

Radio station in Robstown–Corpus Christi, Texas

- Robstown, Texas; United States
- Broadcast area: Corpus Christi metropolitan area
- Frequency: 1510 kHz
- Branding: K-Rob

Programming
- Format: Tejano and conjunto

Ownership
- Owner: Claro Communications; (B Communications Joint Venture)

History
- First air date: February 22, 1963
- Former call signs: KGLF (1993-?)
- Call sign meaning: Robstown

Technical information
- Licensing authority: FCC
- Facility ID: 65167
- Class: D
- Power: 500 watts (days only)
- Transmitter coordinates: 27°46′39.00″N 97°37′55.00″W
- Repeaters: 93.1 K226CF (Ingleside); 94.3 K232DE (Corpus Christi)

Links
- Public license information: Public file; LMS
- Website: www.krob1510.com

KROB (1510 AM, "The Conjunto Station") is a commercial radio station licensed to Robstown, Texas, United States, and serves the Corpus Christi metropolitan area. Owned by Claro Communications, also known as B Communications Joint Venture, it features a Tejano and Conjunto format.

KROB operates only during the daylight hours; programming is also heard around the clock over FM translator K232DE 94.3 MHz in Corpus Christi.

== History ==
KROB signed on the air on February 22, 1963. It served the farming community of Robstown with a full service, country music format, including local news and agricultural reports. In 1966 KROB added an FM sister station, KROB-FM 99.9 (now KSAB). The AM and FM stations simulcast with the FM outlet providing nighttime service when the AM station was off the air.

KROB was assigned the call letters KGLF on August 1, 1993. On October 9, 2002, the station changed its call sign back to KROB.

An FM translator was added in the late 2000s on 94.3 to allow KROB to be heard on FM in Corpus Christi.
