= Rio Airways =

American regional airline

Rio Airways Rio
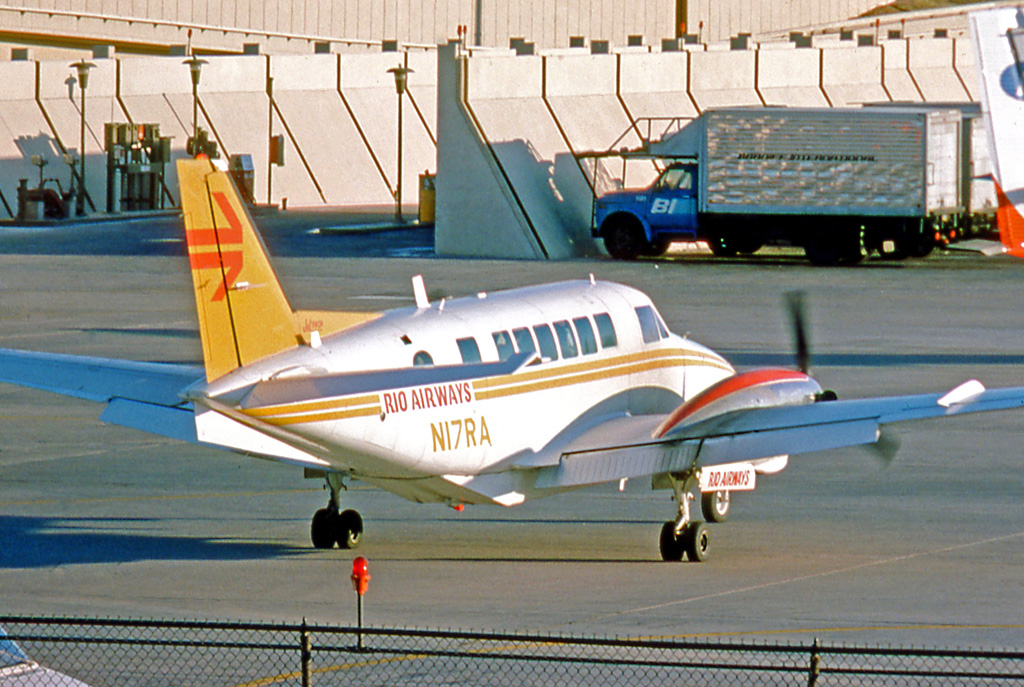
IATA	ICAO	Call sign
XO	XO	XO
- Commenced operations: 1965; 61 years ago
- Ceased operations: 1987; 39 years ago
- Operating bases: Killeen Municipal Airport
- Hubs: Dallas/Fort Worth International Airport
- Alliance: Delta Air Lines, Braniff (1983-1990), TranStar Airlines
- Fleet size: See Fleet below
- Destinations: See Destinations below
- Headquarters: Killeen, Texas, United States

Rio Airways was a regional passenger airline headquartered in Killeen, Texas, United States, and was operational from 1967 to 1987.

Rio Airways was initially based in Corpus Christi, Texas in 1970. The air carrier initiated service with three Beechcraft 99 commuter turboprops and was operating scheduled passenger flights in 1970 serving Austin, Brownsville, Corpus Christi, Houston, Laredo, TX, McAllen, TX and San Antonio. Rio was then purchased by Hood Airlines in 1971 with this small air carrier respectively being based in Killeen with Hood dropping its own name but continuing to use the Rio Airways name.

Rio Airways operated code sharing flights on behalf of Delta Air Lines from June 1984 through December 1986 whereby Rio flights were booked and sold under the Delta Connection brand name as Delta was operating a hub at the Dallas/Fort Worth International Airport (DFW) at this time. Delta subsequently replaced Rio with Atlantic Southeast Airlines (ASA) for its Delta Connection service at DFW. Rio then briefly operated as Braniff Express on behalf of Braniff from December, 1986 through the spring of 1987. Prior to the Delta Connection and Braniff Express service, Rio Airways (air carrier code "XO") operated independently but shared terminal gates at the DFW airport first with Texas International Airlines (1974), then with Braniff International Airways (1975-1978). Prior to operations at DFW it operated at Dallas Love Field, having its roots in two smaller commuter air carriers, Dal Airways and Hood Airways.

== Labor issues ==
In 1972, Rio pilots initiated collective bargaining efforts with proposed representation by the Teamsters, but vigorous opposition by Rio management and strong appeals by popular pilot Mike Mills, swayed the pilots to reject the union. Two years later, the Rio pilot group having grown dissatisfied with Rio management's failure to carry through with promises made to discourage the former unionization efforts, solicited the National Labor Relations Board (NLRB) to conduct another union vote. This time the initial solicitation was actually initiated by Mike Mills who personally handed out the solicitation cards to be signed by pilots, and the pilots unanimously voted ALPA subsidiary "UPA" as their collective bargaining agent.

After a year of failed negotiations the NLRB mediator declared a thirty-day "cooling-off" period and then made his recommendation known to the pilot group that "only a strike will likely force the company to abandon coercive and probably unsafe practices against the pilots." The pilots had an almost 100% walk-out beginning August 1976, with the exception of management pilot Herb Cunningham, and line pilots Mike Mills, Calvin Humphrey, Will Kilgore, and Hugh Longmoor remaining with the company. The company hired replacement pilots from across the country, many of whom arrived to discover the airline under a labor dispute.

The strike continued for two years, with no UPA pilot returning to the company, until August 1978, when pilots Calvin Humphrey and Mike Mills organized a "sweetheart" union which de-certified UPA and established the "Rio Pilots Association". Rio acquired competitor Davis Airlines of College Station, Texas in 1979 and began service to that city.

The Connell's who owned Rio, sold it in early 1986 to a group of investors from Houston, Texas headed by Hugh Seaborn a former owner of Metro Airlines

Rio operated various aircraft types through its history and initially flew single piston engine Piper Cherokee Six and twin piston engine Beech 18 aircraft. Turboprop aircraft were then operated, including the Beechcraft 99 until 1977 followed by de Havilland Canada DHC-6 Twin Otters, Fairchild Swearingen Metroliners (Metro II models), de Havilland Canada DHC-7 Dash 7s and Beechcraft 1900Cs.

== Incidents ==
On January 12, 1971, a Rio Airways flight from Dallas crashed on short approach to the Killeen Municipal airport, injuring several people, including the chancellor of MH-B College. The flight descended below the approach minimum altitude in fog and struck the ground about a quarter mile (one-half kilometer) short of the runway, slid across Highway 190 and came to rest on the airport boundary fence.

On February 15, 1983, an Iranian man, Hussein Shey Kholya, hijacked a Rio Airways flight from Killeen to Dallas/Fort Worth. The plane landed in Nuevo Laredo.

== Destinations in 1970 ==
According to the June 1, 1970 Rio Airways route map, the airline was serving the following destinations as an independent regional air carrier:

- Austin, Texas (AUS)
- Brownsville, TX (BRO)
- Corpus Christi, TX (CRP) - Hub
- Houston, Texas - Houston George Bush Intercontinental Airport (IAH)
- Laredo, Texas (LRD)
- McAllen, Texas (MFE)
- San Antonio, Texas (SAT)

== Destinations in 1978 ==
According to the April 1, 1978 Rio Airways route map, the airline was serving the following destinations as an independent regional air carrier:

- College Station, Texas (CLL)
- Dallas/Fort Worth, Texas - Dallas/Fort Worth International Airport (DFW) - Hub
- Houston, Texas - Houston George Bush Intercontinental Airport (IAH)
- Killeen, Texas (ILE)
- Temple, Texas (TPL)
- Waco, Texas (ACT)
- Wichita Falls, Texas (SPS)

== Destinations in 1983 ==
According to the January 1, 1983 Rio Airways route map, the airline was serving the following destinations as an independent regional air carrier:

- College Station, Texas (CLL)
- Dallas/Fort Worth, Texas - Dallas/Fort Worth International Airport (DFW) - Hub
- Greenville, Mississippi (GLH)
- Hot Springs, Arkansas (HOT)
- Houston, Texas - Houston George Bush Intercontinental Airport (IAH)
- Jackson, Tennessee (MKL)
- Jonesboro, Arkansas (JBR)
- Killeen, Texas (ILE)
- Little Rock, Arkansas (LIT)
- Memphis, Tennessee (MEM) - Focus city
- San Angelo, Texas (SJT)
- Temple, Texas (TPL)
- Texarkana, Arkansas (TXK)
- Waco, Texas (ACT)
- Wichita Falls, Texas (SPS)

The airline also previously served Abilene, Texas (ABI), Dallas Love Field (DAL), Fort Worth Meacham International Airport (FTW) and Lawton, Oklahoma (LAW).

== Delta Connection destinations in 1984 & 1985 ==
According to the November 1, 1984 Rio Airways route map, the airline was serving the following destinations as a Delta Connection air carrier on behalf of Delta Air Lines. Rio was continuing to serve all of these destinations flying as the Delta Connection in 1985 with Beechcraft 99, Beechcraft 1900C and de Havilland Canada DHC-7 Dash 7 turboprops according to the February 15, 1985 edition of the Official Airline Guide (OAG):

- Bryan, Texas/College Station, Texas (CLL)
- Dallas/Fort Worth, Texas - Dallas/Fort Worth International Airport (DFW) - Hub & connecting airport for Delta Air Lines mainline flights
- Killeen, Texas (ILE)
- San Angelo, Texas (SJT)
- Temple, Texas (TPL)
- Texarkana, Arkansas (TXK)
- Waco, Texas (ACT)
- Wichita Falls, Texas (SPS)

== Officers ==
Ted C. Connell, Chairman Of Board; Mark S. Connell, Vice Chairman of Board; Pete Howe, Executive Vice President

== TranStar SkyLink ==
From late 1986 through spring 1987, Rio Airways provided commuter passenger feed services via a code sharing agreement on behalf of TranStar Airlines, the successor to Muse Air, after this new start up jet airline was acquired by Southwest Airlines and renamed TranStar. Only in print media were Rio's aircraft ever illustrated in TranStar SkyLink brandings. According to TranStar, the plan was for Rio to operate TranStar Skylink service with smaller Beechcraft 1900C and Fokker F27 turboprop aircraft in order to replace jet service then being flown by TranStar on the Houston Hobby - Brownsville, TX route as well as being operated on other feeder routes to smaller cities in Louisiana and Texas (see below) with these smaller destinations not being served directly by TranStar with jets. Although Rio did operate TranStar SkyLink service with Beechcraft 1900C commuter propjets, it appears they were not operating the Fokker F27 on SkyLink services in early 1987 according to the Official Airline Guide (OAG).

== TranStar SkyLink destinations in 1987 ==
According to February 1, 1987 TranStar timetable route maps, Rio Airways was operating TranStar SkyLink service to the following cities with connections to and from TranStar jet flights at Austin, Houston Hobby Airport and New Orleans:

- Austin (AUS) - connecting airport for TranStar jet service
- Beaumont, TX/Port Arthur, TX (BPT)
- College Station, TX (CLL)
- Houston Hobby Airport (HOU) - connecting airport for TranStar jet service
- Killeen, TX (ILE)
- Lafayette, LA (LFT)
- Lake Charles, LA (LCH)
- Laredo, TX (LRD)
- New Orleans (MSY) - connecting airport for TranStar jet service
- San Angelo, TX (SJT)
- Victoria, TX (VCT)

The above referenced TranStar route map also indicates that Brownsville, TX (BRO) was continuing to receive TranStar jet service at this time.

== Fleet ==
Rio operated the following turboprop aircraft types during its existence:

- Beechcraft 99 (A models)
- Beechcraft 1900C
- de Havilland Canada DHC-6 Twin Otter
- de Havilland Canada DHC-7 Dash 7
- Fairchild Swearingen Metroliner (Metro II models)

== See also ==
- List of defunct airlines of the United States
- Airlines of Texas
- Conquest Airlines
- Emerald Air (USA)
- Metro Airlines
- Lone Star Airlines
- Aspen Mountain Air
