= Bermuda Dunes Airport =

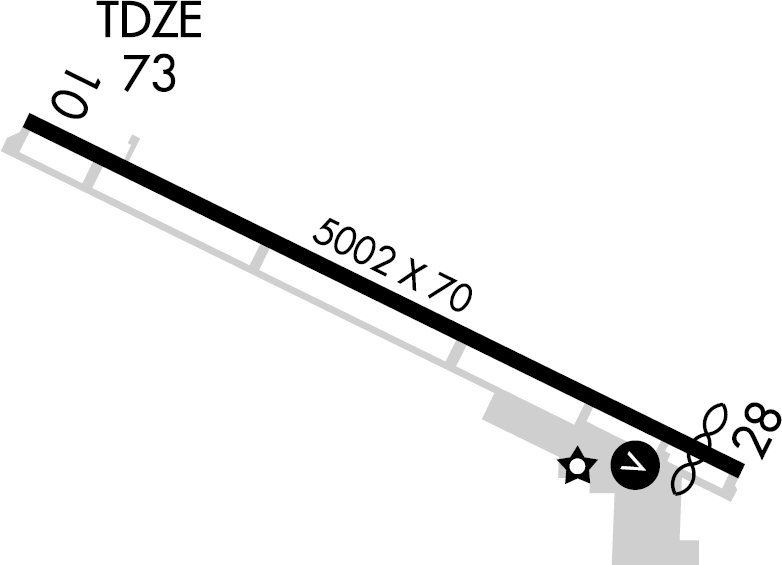
- IATA: UDD; ICAO: KUDD; FAA LID: UDD

Summary
- Owner: Crown Aero LLC
- Serves: Coachella Valley, California
- Elevation AMSL: 73 ft (22 m)
- Coordinates: 33°44′54″N 116°16′29″W
- Website: www.bermudadunesairport.org

Map
- Location of airport in California

Runways
Direction	Length		Surface
Direction	ft	m	Surface
10/28	5,002	1,525	Asphalt

Statistics (2011)
- Aircraft operations: 40,020
- Based aircraft: 137
- Source: Federal Aviation Administration

Bermuda Dunes Airport (IATA: UDD, ICAO: KUDD, FAA LID: UDD) is a public use airport located in Bermuda Dunes, a town 13 nautical miles (15 mi, 24 km) east of the central business district of Palm Springs, a city in the Coachella Valley of Riverside County, California, United States. It is privately owned by Crown Aero, LLC.

The airport is home to Desert West Aviation, a local flight school, as well as Coachella Valley Aviation, providing A&P/IA service for airplanes and helicopters.

== Facilities and aircraft ==
Bermuda Dunes Airport covers an area of 105 acres (38 ha) at an elevation of 73 feet (22 m) above mean sea level. It has one runway designated 10/28 with an asphalt surface measuring 5,002 by 70 feet (1,525 x 21 m).

For the 12-month period ending December 31, 2019, the airport had an average of 38 aircraft operations per day: 64% transient general aviation and 36% local general aviation. At that time there were 66 aircraft based at this airport: 56 single-engine, 5 multi-engine, no jet, and 3 helicopters.

== Past airline service ==
Air LA, a commuter airline that was based in Los Angeles, operated scheduled passenger flights from the airport in 1989 with British Aerospace BAe Jetstream 31 turboprop aircraft nonstop to Las Vegas (LAS) and Los Angeles (LAX).

== Instrument procedures ==
STARs – Standard terminal arrivals

- CLOWD ONE
- SBONO ONE

IAPs – Instrument approach procedures

- RNAV (GPS) RWY 10
- RNAV (GPS) RWY 28
- VOR-C

Note: Special take-off minimums/departure procedures apply.
