= Robert Mueller Municipal Airport =

Airport in Austin, Texas, United States (1930–1999)

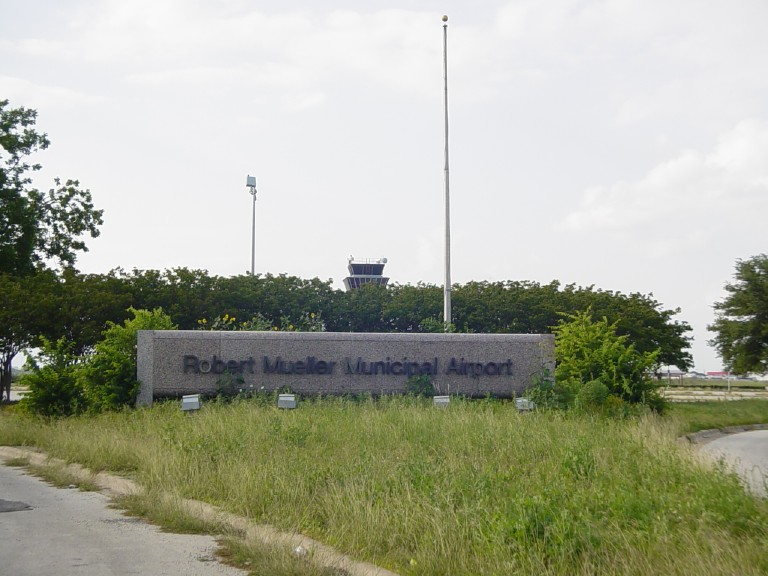
- Former airport entrance
- IATA: AUS; ICAO: KAUS; FAA LID: AUS

Summary
- Airport type: Defunct
- Owner/Operator: Department of Aviation of the City of Austin
- Location: Austin, Texas, U.S.
- Opened: October 14, 1930
- Closed: June 22, 1999
- Passenger services ceased: May 22, 1999
- Elevation AMSL: 632 ft (193 m)
- Coordinates: 30°18′00″N 097°42′00″W

Maps
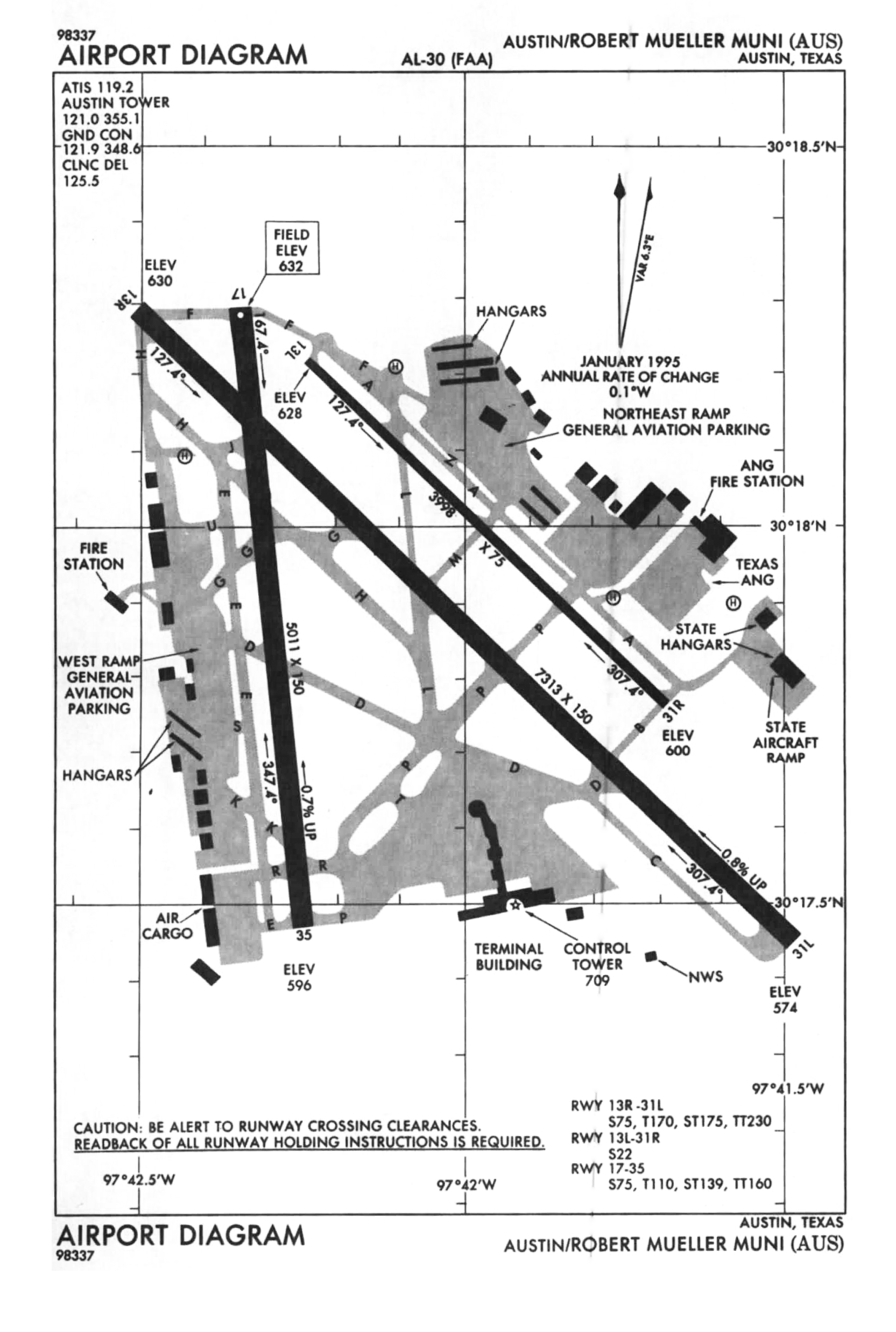
- FAA airport diagram

- Location within Texas AUS (the United States)

Runways
Direction	Length		Surface
Direction	ft	m	Surface
13L/31R	3,998	914	Unknown
13R/31L	7,313	2,229	Unknown
17/35	5,011	1,527	Unknown

Robert Mueller Municipal Airport (IATA: AUS, ICAO: KAUS, FAA LID: AUS) was the first city-owned airport built in Austin, Texas, United States. It was located four miles (6 km) northeast of downtown. The facility opened in October 1930 and was named for Robert Mueller, a city councilor who had died three years earlier. A new terminal was inaugurated in 1961. In May 1999, Mueller was replaced by Austin–Bergstrom International Airport, which is situated on the site of the former Bergstrom Air Force Base.

== History ==
Austin voters passed a bond issue to fund a municipal airport in May 1928. The airport was constructed four miles (6 km) northeast of downtown on what was then the edge of the city. A 1,000-foot (300 m) runway and small terminal were built on a 175-acre site. The airport began operations on October 14, 1930. It was named after Robert Mueller, a city commissioner who had died in office in January 1927. (Note: The politician pronounced his last name /ˈmɪlər/. According to his son, Austin residents initially pronounced the airport's name that way, but as the city grew new pronunciations arose, such as /ˈmjuːlər/.) Passenger flights were available from the beginning; Texas Air Transport had begun service to Austin in 1929, initially flying into a privately owned airfield. The seat of the state government and home of the University of Texas at Austin, the city soon attracted more flights. By 1931, Mueller Airport was served by three airlines. A second runway was added in 1937.

During World War II, the airport was busy. Due to congestion at Del Valle Army Air Base, which had opened southeast of downtown Austin in 1942, some trainees practiced landing Douglas C-47s at Mueller. Air traffic also included commercial flights, private pilots, and students in the Civilian Pilot Training Program at the University of Texas. In 1942, a building that was originally intended for a flying school was repurposed as the new passenger terminal, and the airport's first air traffic control tower was built atop it.

=== Expansions ===
In the 1950s, airport traffic increased as the city grew and more people traveled by air, putting a strain on the terminal. In addition, Mueller needed longer runways to handle heavier and faster aircraft like the Douglas DC-4. Therefore, officials initiated an expansion project. The main runway was lengthened and equipped with new lighting, and a new passenger terminal and control tower were built. The tower was known for its alternating light-blue and dark-blue porcelain panels. The terminal opened in April 1961. The following month, the two structures were dedicated in a ceremony attended by Vice President Lyndon B. Johnson and Austin mayor Lester Palmer.

As of 1957, three airlines flew to Austin: Braniff International Airways, Trans-Texas Airways and Continental Airlines. Nonstop flights did not reach beyond San Antonio, San Angelo, Dallas Love Field or Houston Hobby Airport.

The jet age arrived in Austin in April 1965 when Braniff International introduced BAC One-Elevens on its flight to Amarillo via Dallas and Lubbock. Two years later, Browning Aerial Service, a fixed-base operator at Mueller, started a charter flight to Marfa as a faster way for employees of the Department of Astronomy at the University of Texas to reach the McDonald Observatory. Three aviation units of the Texas National Guard shifted to Mueller from Camp Mabry in 1970.

In the 1970s, problems with Mueller led the city to contemplate building a new airport. Mueller was surrounded by housing and businesses, and plane crashes had occurred in the vicinity. The facility was also becoming congested, and its airspace overlapped with that of the air base, now known as Bergstrom Air Force Base. Where to relocate the aging Mueller would become a perennial issue in Austin politics.

A series of expansions took place. A project completed in 1976 included jetways, a larger baggage claim, and a second instrument landing system. Five gates were added in 1983. In 1990, officials unveiled a new section of the terminal that provided four more gates and extra ticket counters. A new air-cargo facility was erected as well.

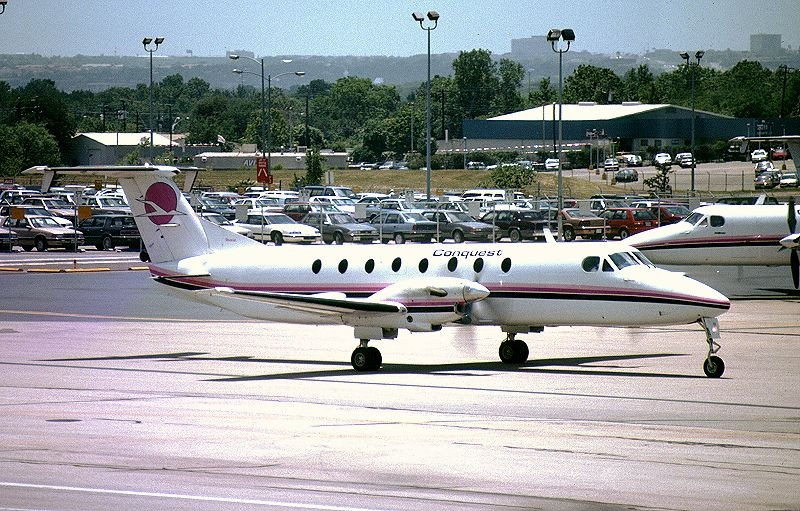
A Conquest Airlines Beechcraft 1900C at Mueller in 1989

Passenger counts rose as a result of airline deregulation and the growth of Austin's high-tech economy. A commuter carrier named Conquest Airlines moved its headquarters from Beaumont to Austin in 1989. The airline linked its hub at Mueller to five destinations in Texas as of 1993.

In August 1980, Hurricane Allen gave rise to a tornado that struck Mueller, destroying hangars and aircraft of the fixed-base operator Ragsdale Aviation. The passenger terminal was unaffected, and no one was killed.

=== Closure and replacement ===
Officials were planning to relocate the airport to Manor when the Department of Defense announced in 1990 that it advised closing Bergstrom Air Force Base, opening another possibility. The closure was approved in 1991. In 1993, Austin residents voted to convert the base into the city's new civilian airport. Bergstrom ceased operations as an active base that year and as a reserve base in 1996. Work on the new facility commenced in 1995. The 12,250-foot (3,730 m) runway was returned to serviceable condition. Buildings at the site were sold or demolished, and a terminal building, second runway, and traffic and parking infrastructure were built in their place.

In its final years, Mueller was operating beyond its capacity. Conquest Airlines shut down in 1997, and the following year former executives of the company launched a new regional airline, Austin Express. From January to October 1998, Aerolitoral flew the first international route from Austin to Monterrey, Mexico. The airport handled 6.1 million passengers in 1998.

Robert Mueller Municipal Airport's commercial service ended on May 22, 1999, when a Continental Airlines Boeing 737 bound for Albuquerque pushed back from the gate at 21:54. Austin-Bergstrom International Airport opened the next day. General-aviation activities at Mueller were scheduled to end on June 22; however, some departures were delayed due to weather.

=== Redevelopment as Mueller community ===
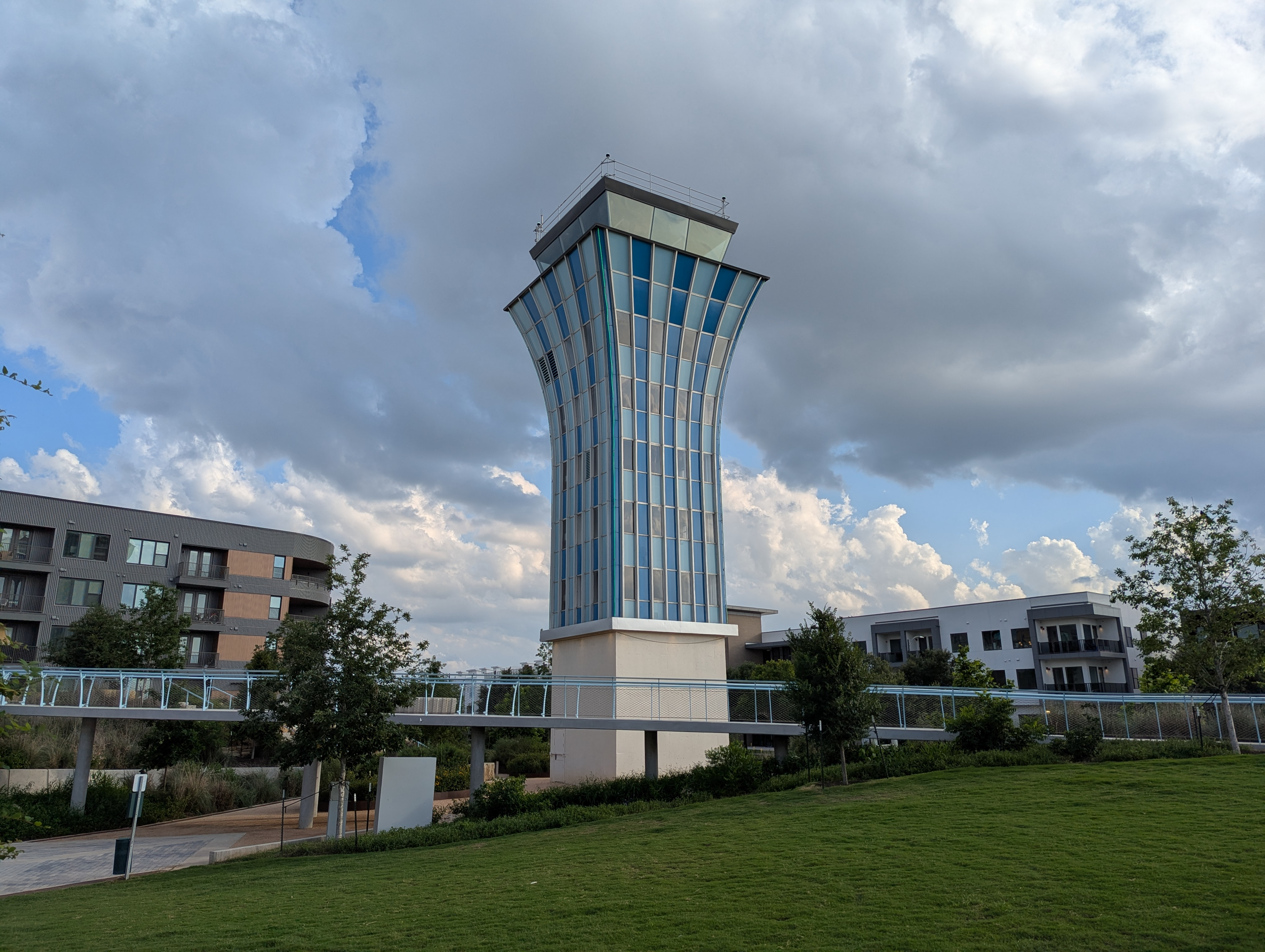
The former control tower on the southern edge of Mueller in 2026

In 2004, the city approved a development plan to transform the land that once housed the airport into the new community of Mueller. People began settling in the neighborhood in 2007. The airport's control tower was preserved and restored in response to the local community's desire to keep the iconic 1961 structure. The view of the Texas State Capitol from the base of the tower became one of the Capitol View Corridors protected under state and local law from obstruction by tall buildings in 1983, though redevelopment of the Mueller subdivision is exempt from the regulation. In March 2025, a park opened around the tower.

Robert Mueller Municipal Airport also left behind 20 acres of hangars that the city leased to the Austin Film Society. The organization converted the hangars into soundstages and opened Austin Studios, a film production facility, in 2000.

== Facilities ==
Mueller Airport occupied 711 acres (3 km^{2}) and was owned and operated by the Department of Aviation of the City of Austin. There were three runways, the longest of which measured 7,313 feet (2,229 m). The passenger terminal had 16 gates. The Texas National Guard trained helicopter pilots at Mueller, and the Texas State Aircraft Pooling Board operated facilities for government planes.
