= Bermuda Dunes, California =

Bermuda Dunes
- Census-designated place
- Location in Riverside County and the state of California

- Location in the United States
- Coordinates: 33°44′40″N 116°17′7″W
- Country: United States
- State: California
- County: Riverside
- Established: 1958

Area
  - Total: 2.95 sq mi (7.63 km^{2})
  - Land: 2.95 sq mi (7.63 km^{2})
  - Water: 0 sq mi (0.00 km^{2}) 0%
- Elevation: 95 ft (29 m)

Population (2020)
  - Total: 8,244
  - Density: 2,797.3/sq mi (1,080.04/km^{2})
- Time zone: UTC-8 (Pacific)
  - Summer (DST): UTC-7 (PDT)
- ZIP code: 92203
- Area codes: 442/760
- FIPS code: 06-06028
- GNIS feature IDs: 1866998, 2407831
- Website: www.bermudadunesonline.com

Bermuda Dunes is a census-designated place (CDP) in Riverside County, California. The population was 8,244 at the 2020 census. Situated approximately 19 miles (31 km) east of Palm Springs, Bermuda Dunes is located in the mid-valley area of the Coachella Valley, between the cities of Palm Desert, La Quinta, and Indio.

Bermuda Dunes formerly had the name of Myoma. The Bermuda Dunes Country Club was developed in 1958 by Ernie Dunlevie and Ray Ryan; it attracted celebrities such as Clark Gable as members. The community is also home to the general aviation Bermuda Dunes Airport.

== Geography ==
Bermuda Dunes is located at 33°44′40″N 116°17′7″W (33.745, -116.285).

The CDP's name originated from the Bermuda Dunes country club, a golf course community designed by William Francis Bell first opened in 1962 and the former site of the Bob Hope Chrysler Golf Classic. There are 10 other golf clubs and communities within the 5-mile (8.0 km) radius, including Sun City Palm Desert. Bermuda Dunes Airport is located in the community.

=== Public services ===
The local public school district is the Desert Sands Unified School District, with one elementary school within the community boundaries; James Monroe Elementary. Bermuda Dunes also hosts the Desert Christian Academy, a private preschool through grade 12 school. Electricity is provided by the Imperial Irrigation District and Southern California Edison across Washington Street. Water is provided by both the IID and the Myoma Dunes Water Company and telephone landlines are administered by Verizon.

According to the United States Census Bureau, the CDP has a total area of 2.9 square miles (7.5 km^{2}), all of it land. The official elevation of Bermuda Dunes is 30 feet (9.1 m) above sea level, but the surface drops by over 80 feet (24 m) from west to east.

The distance from Bermuda Dunes to Washington, D.C. is approximately 2,318 miles (3,730 km). The distance to Sacramento, the California state capital, is approximately 507 miles (816 km), and to Los Angeles, the state's largest city, is 122 miles (196 km). Bermuda Dunes shares two ZIP codes with Indio: 92201 and 92203. The telephone area codes are 760 and 442.

=== Terrain and climate ===
Located in the Coachella Valley desert region, Bermuda Dunes is sheltered by the San Jacinto Mountains to the west, the Santa Rosa Mountains to the south and by the Little San Bernardino Mountains to the east. This geography gives Bermuda Dunes its hot, dry climate, with 354 days of sunshine and only 3.44 inches (87.4 mm) of rain annually.

Bermuda Dunes has a warm winter/hot summer climate: Its average annual high temperature is 89.5 °F (31.9 °C) and average annual low is 62.1 °F (16.7 °C) but summer highs above 110 °F (43 °C) are common and sometimes exceed 120 °F (49 °C), while summer night lows often stay above 82 °F (28 °C). Winters are warm with daytime highs often between 70–86 °F (21–30 °C) and corresponding night lows falling to 48–68 °F (9–20 °C). The mean annual temperature is 75.8 °F (24.3 °C).

Climate data for Bermuda Dunes, CA
Month	Jan	Feb	Mar	Apr	May	Jun	Jul	Aug	Sep	Oct	Nov	Dec	Year
Record high °F (°C)	97 (36)	100 (38)	103 (39)	109 (43)	117 (47)	123 (51)	125 (52)	121 (49)	122 (50)	115 (46)	101 (38)	96 (36)	125 (52)
Mean daily maximum °F (°C)	71.9 (22.2)	75.3 (24.1)	81.3 (27.4)	87.5 (30.8)	95.7 (35.4)	103.1 (39.5)	107.3 (41.8)	106.6 (41.4)	102.0 (38.9)	91.9 (33.3)	79.6 (26.4)	71.0 (21.7)	89.5 (31.9)
Mean daily minimum °F (°C)	44.6 (7.0)	48.0 (8.9)	54.8 (12.7)	60.7 (15.9)	67.7 (19.8)	74.2 (23.4)	80.3 (26.8)	80.3 (26.8)	74.0 (23.3)	63.7 (17.6)	51.8 (11.0)	44.2 (6.8)	62.1 (16.7)
Record low °F (°C)	13 (−11)	20 (−7)	25 (−4)	33 (1)	38 (3)	45 (7)	59 (15)	56 (13)	46 (8)	31 (−1)	23 (−5)	17 (−8)	13 (−11)
Average precipitation inches (mm)	0.56 (14)	0.64 (16)	0.43 (11)	0.05 (1.3)	0.07 (1.8)	0.01 (0.25)	0.04 (1.0)	0.54 (14)	0.04 (1.0)	0.26 (6.6)	0.18 (4.6)	0.62 (16)	3.44 (87)
Source: www.ncdc.noaa.gov

== Demographics ==
Historical population
Census	Pop.	Note	%±
1990	4,571		—
2000	6,229		36.3%
2010	7,282		16.9%
2020	8,244		13.2%
U.S. Decennial Census; 1860–1870 1880-1890; 1900 1910 1920; 1930 1940 1950; 1960 1970 1980; 1990 2000 2010

Bermuda Dunes first appeared as a census-designated place in the 1990 United States census.

=== Racial and ethnic composition ===
Bermuda Dunes CDP, California – Racial and ethnic composition Note: the US Census treats Hispanic/Latino as an ethnic category. This table excludes Latinos from the racial categories and assigns them to a separate category. Hispanics/Latinos may be of any race.
Race / Ethnicity (NH = Non-Hispanic)	Pop 2000	Pop 2010	Pop 2020	% 2000	% 2010	% 2020
White alone (NH)	4,589	4,386	4,212	73.67%	60.23%	51.09%
Black or African American alone (NH)	121	161	179	1.94%	2.21%	2.17%
Native American or Alaska Native alone (NH)	23	31	43	0.37%	0.43%	0.52%
Asian alone (NH)	151	215	271	2.42%	2.95%	3.29%
Native Hawaiian or Pacific Islander alone (NH)	4	10	7	0.06%	0.14%	0.08%
Other race alone (NH)	5	10	55	0.08%	0.14%	0.67%
Mixed race or Multiracial (NH)	121	98	307	1.94%	1.35%	3.72%
Hispanic or Latino (any race)	1,215	2,371	3,170	19.51%	32.56%	38.45%
Total	6,229	7,282	8,244	100.00%	100.00%	100.00%

=== 2020 census ===
As of the 2020 census, Bermuda Dunes had a population of 8,244. The population density was 2,797.4 inhabitants per square mile (1,080.1/km^{2}).

The census reported that 99.9% of the population lived in households, 0.1% lived in non-institutionalized group quarters, and no one was institutionalized. 100.0% of residents lived in urban areas, while 0.0% lived in rural areas.

There were 3,352 households, out of which 29.6% included children under the age of 18. Of all households, 47.0% were married-couple households, 7.4% were cohabiting couple households, 17.5% had a male householder with no spouse or partner present, and 28.1% had a female householder with no spouse or partner present. 26.5% of households were one person, and 11.1% were one person aged 65 or older. There were 2,224 families (66.3% of all households), and the average household size was 2.46.

The age distribution was 21.8% under the age of 18, 7.6% aged 18 to 24, 25.7% aged 25 to 44, 25.9% aged 45 to 64, and 19.1% who were 65 years of age or older. The median age was 40.3 years. For every 100 females, there were 95.8 males, and for every 100 females age 18 and over, there were 92.0 males age 18 and over.

There were 3,861 housing units at an average density of 1,310.1 units per square mile (505.8 units/km^{2}). Of all housing units, 13.2% were vacant. The homeowner vacancy rate was 1.4% and the rental vacancy rate was 5.9%. Of occupied units, 53.9% were owner-occupied and 46.1% were occupied by renters.

Racial composition as of the 2020 census
Race	Number	Percent
White	4,801	58.2%
Black or African American	219	2.7%
American Indian and Alaska Native	96	1.2%
Asian	312	3.8%
Native Hawaiian and Other Pacific Islander	7	0.1%
Some other race	1,393	16.9%
Two or more races	1,416	17.2%

=== 2023 estimates ===
In 2023, the US Census Bureau estimated that 13.1% of the population were foreign-born. Of all people aged 5 or older, 75.6% spoke only English at home, 21.3% spoke Spanish, 0.1% spoke other Indo-European languages, 1.9% spoke Asian or Pacific Islander languages, and 1.0% spoke other languages. Of those aged 25 or older, 89.1% were high school graduates and 35.9% had a bachelor's degree.

The median household income was $93,819, and the per capita income was $47,358. About 5.0% of families and 9.1% of the population were below the poverty line.

== Politics ==
In the Riverside County Board of Supervisors, Thousand Palms is in 4th District, Represented by Democrat V. Manuel Perez Supervisor of the 4th District

In the California State Legislature, Bermuda Dunes is in the 19th senatorial district, represented by Republican Rosilicie Ochoa Bogh, and in the 47th Assembly district, represented by Republican Greg Wallis.

In the United States House of Representatives, Bermuda Dunes is in California's 25th congressional district, represented by Democrat Raul Ruiz.

== Notable people ==
- John J. Benoit (1951–2016), California law enforcement officer and politician
- Rock Hudson, actor, owned a house in Bermuda Dunes. Author Armistead Maupin edited Tales of the City in the house.
- Casey Merrill, former Defensive End for the Green Bay Packers, New York Giants and New Orleans Saints (NFL).
