= Austin–Bergstrom International Airport =

Civilian airport serving Austin, Texas, United States

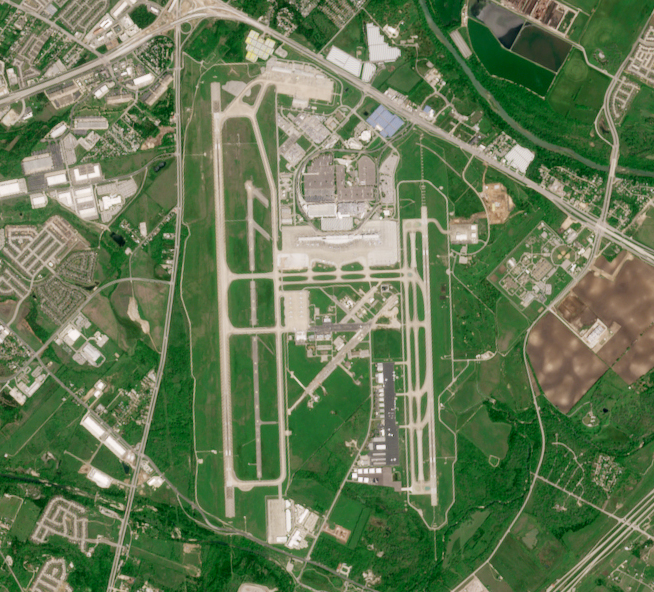
- Satellite view in 2020
- IATA: AUS; ICAO: KAUS; FAA LID: AUS

Summary
- Airport type: Public
- Owner/Operator: City of Austin Aviation Department
- Serves: Greater Austin
- Location: Austin, Texas, U.S.
- Opened: May 23, 1999; 27 years ago
- Focus city for: Delta Air Lines
- Operating base for: Southwest Airlines
- Built: September 19, 1942; 84 years ago
- Elevation AMSL: 542 ft (165 m)
- Coordinates: 30°11′40″N 97°40′12″W
- Website: www.austintexas.gov/airport

Maps
- FAA airport diagram
- Interactive map of Austin–Bergstrom International Airport

Runways
| Direction | Length | | Surface |
| Direction | ft | m | Surface |
|---|---|---|---|
| 18L/36R | 9,000 | 2,743 | Concrete |
| 18R/36L | 12,250 | 3,734 | Concrete |

Helipads
| Number | Length | | Surface |
| Number | ft | m | Surface |
|---|---|---|---|
| H1 | 60 | 18 | Concrete |
| H2 | 60 | 18 | Concrete |
| H3 | 50 | 15 | Concrete |

Statistics (2025)
- Total passengers: 21,666,852 ▼0.44%
- Aircraft operations: 265,366
- Total cargo (lbs.): 276,375,963
- Source: Austin AirportFederal Aviation Administration

Austin–Bergstrom International Airport (ABIA; IATA: AUS, ICAO: KAUS, FAA LID: AUS, formerly BSM) is the main international airport in Austin, Texas, United States, serving the Greater Austin metropolitan area. Located about 5 miles (8 km; 4 nmi) southeast of downtown, it covers 4,242 acres (1,717 ha) and has two runways and three helipads.

The airport lies on the site of what was Bergstrom Air Force Base, named after Captain John August Earl Bergstrom, an officer who was the first person from Austin to be killed in World War II. The base was decommissioned in the early 1990s, and the land reverted to the city, which used it to replace Robert Mueller Municipal Airport as Austin's main airport in 1999. The airport is the third busiest in Texas, after Dallas/Fort Worth and Houston–Intercontinental, as well as the 27th-busiest airport in the United States by passenger traffic. As of 2023, there are more than 550 arrivals and departures on a typical weekday to 97 destinations in North America and Europe.

== History ==
=== Beginnings ===
In 1942, the city of Austin purchased land and donated the land to the federal government of the United States for a military installation, with the stipulation that the city would get the land back when the government no longer needed it. This land became Del Valle Army Air Base, or Del Valle Airfield. Del Valle Airfield was activated on September 19, 1942, on 3,000 acres (12 km^{2}) leased from the City of Austin. The name of the base was changed to Bergstrom Army Airfield (AAF) in March 1943 in honor of Captain John August Earl Bergstrom, a reservist in the 19th Bombardment Group, who was killed at Clark Field, Philippines in 1941. He was the first Austinite killed in World War II. With the separation of the United States Air Force and United States Army in September 1947, the name again changed to Bergstrom Air Force Base. It would have this name until it was decommissioned in the early 1990s, with all military aviation ceasing in 1995 after more than 50 years.

By then, Austin had long since outgrown Robert Mueller Municipal Airport. Mueller had opened in 1930 and had not aged well. The city began considering options for a new airport as early as 1971, when the Federal Aviation Administration proposed that Austin and San Antonio build a joint regional airport. That idea was rejected, as few Austinites supported driving halfway to San Antonio on Interstate 35 to catch a flight. Afterwards, the city submitted a proposal to the United States Air Force for joint use of Bergstrom Air Force Base in 1976. The Air Force rejected the proposal in 1978 as being too disruptive to its operations.

In the 1980s, neighborhoods around Mueller applied enough political pressure to force the city council to choose a site for a new airport from locations under consideration. In November 1987, voters approved a referendum designating a site near Manor. The city began acquiring the land but faced lawsuits from the Sierra Club and others concerned about the Manor location and its potential environmental impact.

The plans to construct a new airport at the Manor location were abandoned in 1991 when the Base Realignment and Closure Commission selected Bergstrom for closure, and gave the nod to the city for the land and runways to be converted for use as a civilian airport. The city council decided to abandon the original plan to build the new airport near Manor, and resolved instead to move the airport to the Bergstrom site. The City of Austin hired John Almond—a civil engineer who had recently led the airport design team for the new airport expansion in San Jose, California—as Project Director for the new $585 million airport in Austin and to put together a team of engineers and contractors to accomplish the task. The issue of a $400 million bond referendum for a new airport owned and operated by the city was put to a public vote in May 1993 with a campaign managed by local public affairs consultant Don Martin and then-Mayor Bruce Todd and was approved by 63% of the vote. Groundbreaking for the new airport began in November 1994.

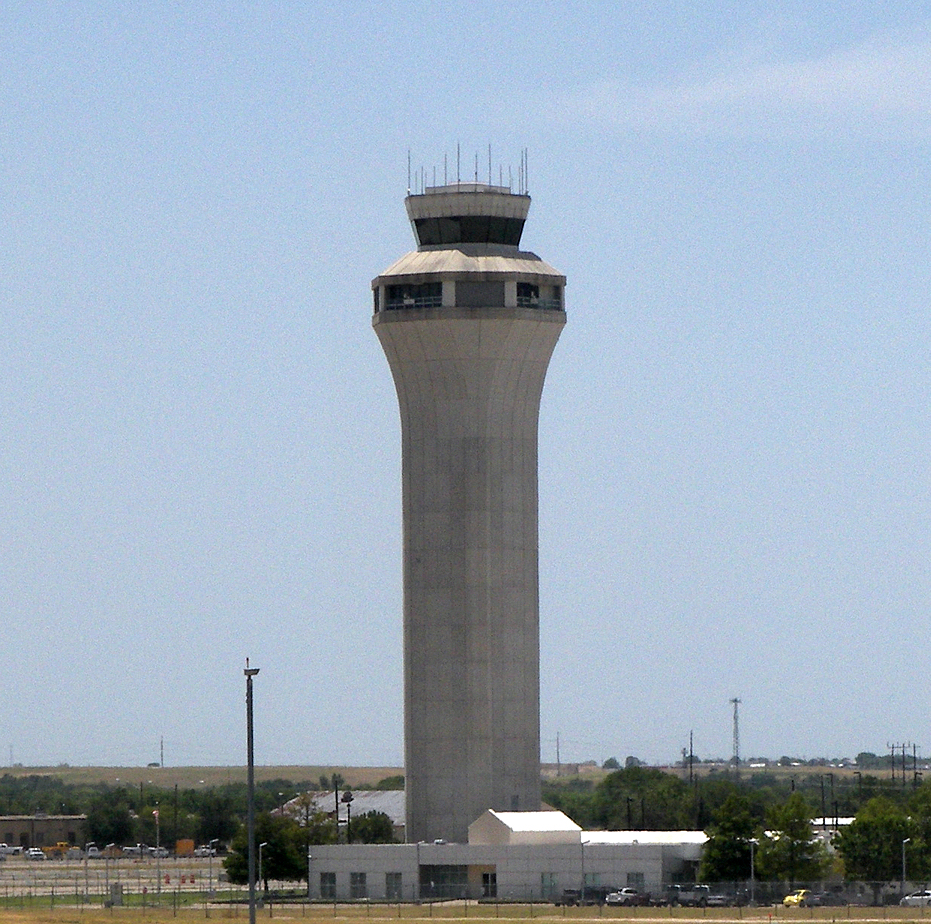
Austin-Bergstrom International Airport's air traffic control tower

On October 23, 1995, with a $10 million budget and after the old tower, previously used by the US Air Force, was demolished, construction began on building Austin's tallest primary building (277 ft [84 m]) that houses air traffic controllers. The new tower, completed a year before then-current president Bill Clinton arrived with his entourage, enabled Air Force One to be granted clearance to land. This made the president the "first passenger" to arrive at the new airport.

The main Air Force runway, 17R/35L, was retained along with most of its taxiways, as its high weight rating and long length would facilitate service by large long-range airliners while reducing construction costs. Bergstrom's original secondary runway, 17L/35R, was closed and partially demolished to accommodate new taxiway sections directly connecting 17R/35L to the new terminal. The remnants of the former runway are used as a service road and a parking area for a Boeing 727 used for emergency training. A replacement 9,000-foot (2,700 m) runway 17L/35R was built east of the terminal, along with a general aviation complex on the southern side of the airport. Most former military buildings, including the original control tower, were demolished and cleared to make way for the new terminal and parking facilities, although some hangars and parking tarmac to the south was retained, along with a section of tarmac to the northeast of the primary runway that became the foundation for the airport's freight terminal. Some existing bridges were converted for ground vehicle access-road use. Military housing in the northwest portion of the former base was leveled, but some of its roads now serve a Texas Department of Transportation service facility. Several Travis County facilities near the airfield, including the county correctional facility and sheriff's training academy, were unaffected by the conversion project.

Bergstrom had the location identifier of BSM until Mueller's final closure in 1999 when it took Mueller's IATA code of AUS. Initial issues with flight scheduling and routing led to proposed plans to keep Mueller operating in parallel with Bergstrom for a few weeks, but residents near Mueller blocked such efforts by appealing to the FAA, who refused to delay the transfer of the AUS identifier or to issue a new airport code for Mueller. Austin–Bergstrom opened to the public on May 23, 1999.

=== Opening ===
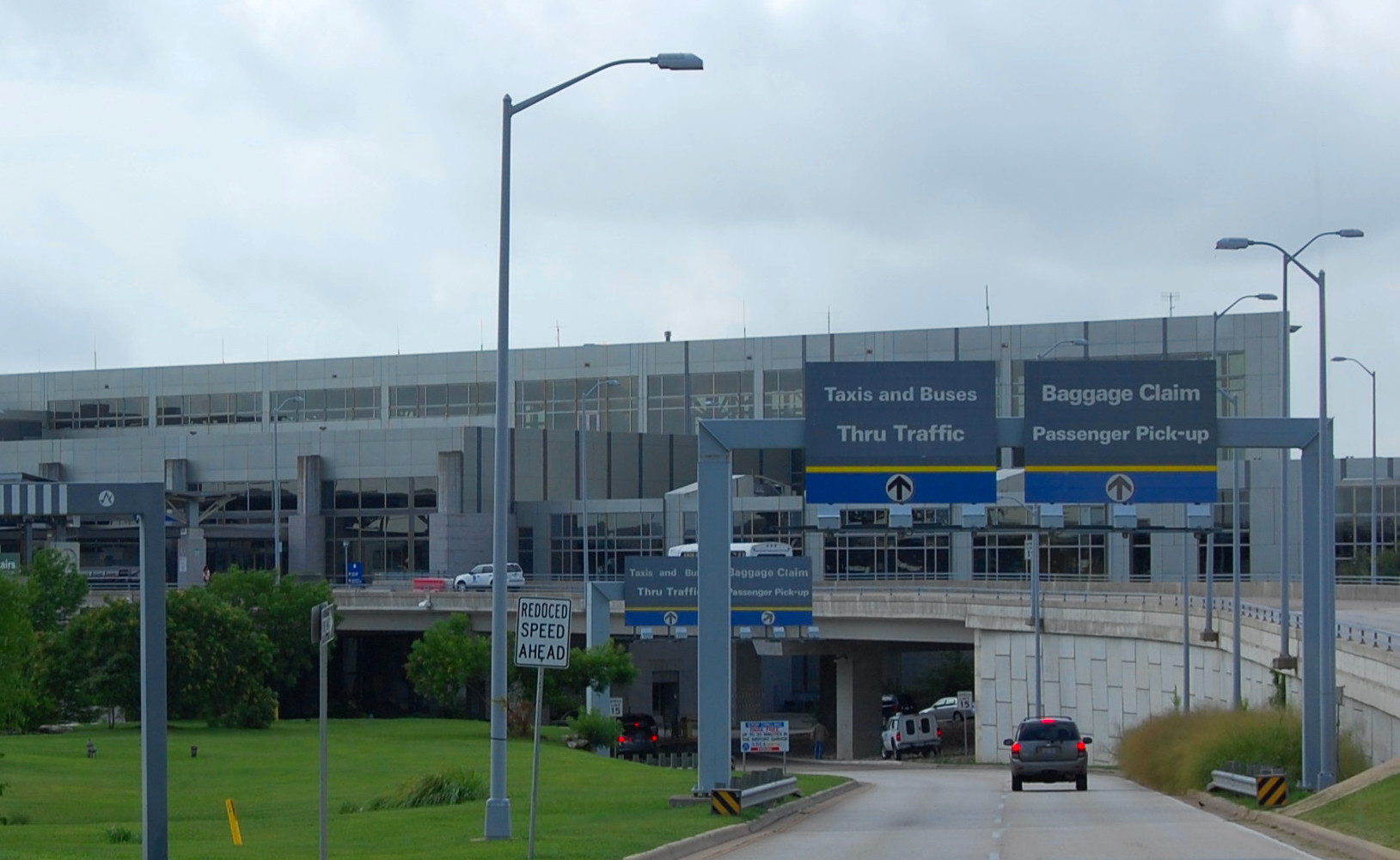
Approaching AUS. The upper-level roadway is for departures, while the lower-level roadway is for arrivals.

Austin–Bergstrom International Airport opened to the public on May 23, 1999, with a 12,250-foot (3,730 m) runway, among the nation's longest commercial runways. The Barbara Jordan passenger terminal was originally conceived as an 18-gate terminal facility with a footprint of a bit more than 500,000 square feet (46,000 m^{2}). ABIA was expanded during construction to have 24 contact gates with jet bridges (named Gate 2-Gate 25) and one gate without a jet bridge (named Gate 1) for a total footprint of 660,000 square feet (61,000 m^{2}).

The opening of the airport coincided with a considerable number of nonstop flights being operated into Austin from the Dallas–Fort Worth metroplex, as American Airlines had decided to compete with Southwest Airlines' scheduled service between Dallas Love Field (DAL) and Austin in addition to American and Delta Air Lines service between Dallas–Fort Worth International Airport (DFW) and AUS. At the time, there were 42 nonstop flights every weekday being operated with mainline jet aircraft from the two primary airports located in the Dallas/Fort Worth metroplex to Austin. By contrast, this same OAG lists a combined total of 24 nonstop flights every weekday at this time from the two primary airports serving the Houston area, William P. Hobby Airport (HOU) and George Bush Intercontinental Airport (IAH), to Austin.

=== Recent history ===
As the population and economic importance of Austin has grown in recent years, airlines have been introducing new nonstop flights to the airport instead of routing passengers through existing hubs in Dallas and Houston, causing dramatic growth in both passenger numbers and nonstop service at Austin–Bergstrom. In March 2014, British Airways inaugurated a flight to London's Heathrow Airport. This was the airport's first scheduled transatlantic service.

The terminal's first expansion project was completed in the summer of 2015. It added an enlarged customs and immigration facility on the arrivals level capable of processing more than 600 passengers per hour, two domestic baggage claim belts, and an enlarged security checkpoint on the ticketing level. In 2019, a $350 million addition to the east side of the terminal added nine new gates, increasing the total number of gates from 25 to 34. These gates are spaced farther apart, to accommodate additional flights operated by larger aircraft. Gates 1 and 3 and Gates 2 and 4 are able to act independently of each other when accommodating narrow body aircraft, or as one gate's Door A and Door B in a dual jet-bridge configuration when larger, wide-body aircraft arrive providing boarding options. The number of flexible-use gates that can accommodate both international and domestic flights increased from two to six.

To accommodate rapid passenger growth amid construction at the Barbara Jordan Terminal a three-gate South Terminal opened on April 13, 2017. The terminal was developed by private operator LoneStar Airport Holdings under a 40-year lease agreement with the airport and built at a cost of approximately US$12 million. The facility reused a former Bergstrom Air Force Base building and included outdoor waiting areas and a food-truck court. Designed with a retro aesthetic, the terminal used hardstand gates without jet bridges, with passengers boarding aircraft via stairs under covered walkways. The South Terminal was used exclusively by ultra-low-cost carriers Allegiant Air and Frontier Airlines. The terminal closed on March 31, 2026, ahead of a planned airport expansion project that called for its demolition. The closure led to litigation from LoneStar, which argued that the airport was violating their lease agreement and stated that it had invested approximately $50 million into developing and operating the facility. In 2023, a court ruled in favor of LoneStar, after which the airport agreed to an $88 million settlement to terminate the lease early.

=== Future ===
As of 2024, Austin-Bergstrom is undergoing a major expansion program, entitled "Journey With AUS", to accommodate the rapid growth in travel demand. Chief amongst the expansion plans are two projects; the first being the construction of a new arrivals and departures hall that will consolidate all ticketing, security screening and baggage claims under one roof. The second being the construction of Concourse B that will include over 20 gates initially, and could be expanded up to 40 in the future. Concourse B will be connected to the existing Barbara Jordan Terminal (to be renamed Concourse A) via an underground tunnel, and the tunnel will be capable of expanding to a future Concourse C.

== Facilities ==
=== Terminal ===
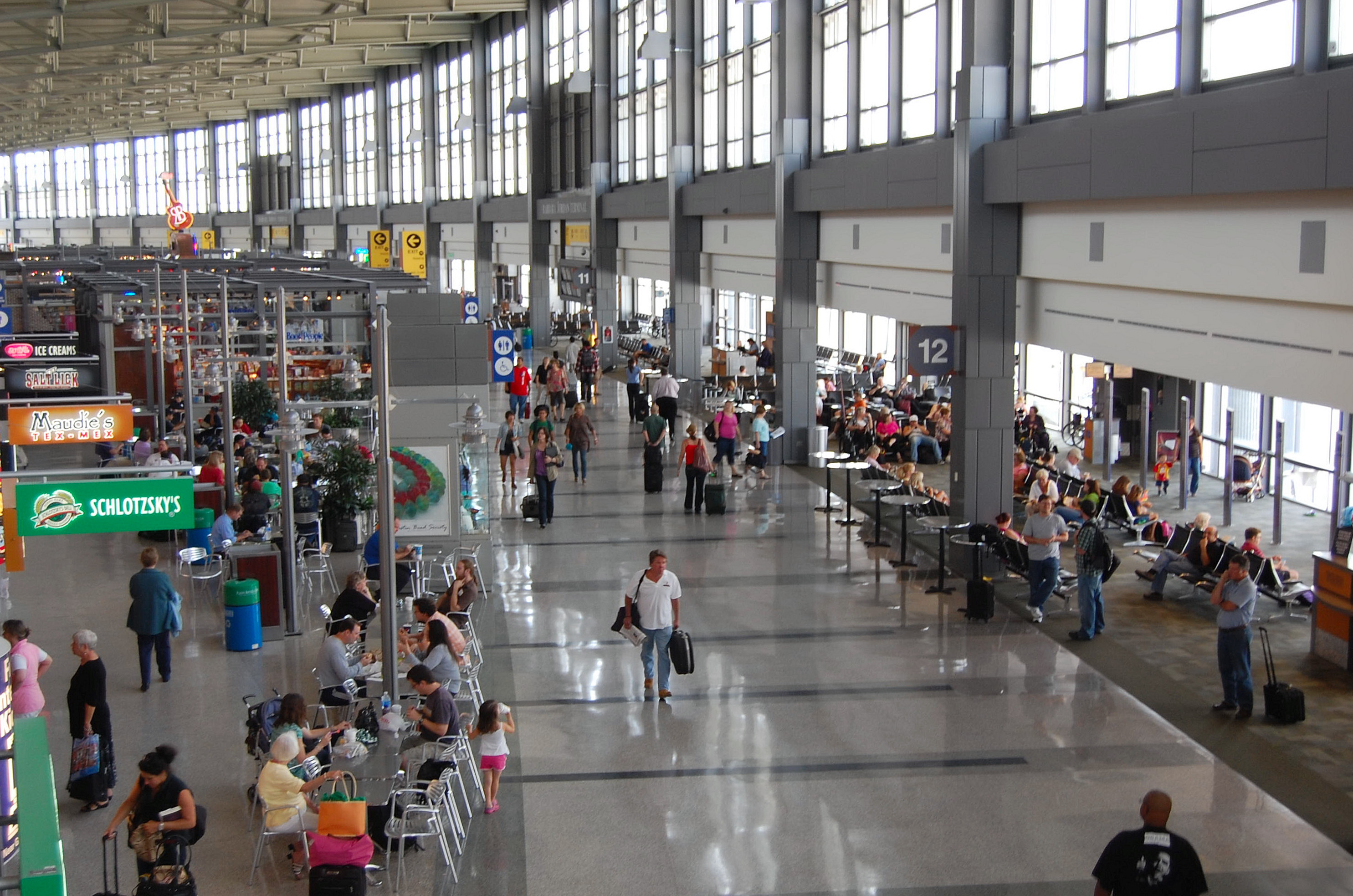
The passenger concourse at the Barbara Jordan Terminal

The Barbara Jordan Terminal is the airport's main terminal and has a total of 34 gates, six of which are capable of handling international flights. There are several restaurants and food concessions inside the terminal, all but two of which are located inside the secured gate areas of the terminal. There are three airport lounges at the airport, these are run by American Airlines, Delta Air Lines, and United Airlines. The terminal also has a live music stage on which local bands perform in keeping with the spirit of Austin's proclamation as "The Live Music Capital of the World".

=== Ground transportation ===
Route 20, operated by the Capital Metropolitan Transportation Authority, operates from the arrivals level of the Barbara Jordan Terminal every 15 minutes. The route takes passengers through the East Riverside Corridor to Downtown and University of Texas at Austin before heading east along Manor Road. Route 483 operates after midnight six days a week to provide late hours service through the East Riverside Corridor to Downtown.

Through the Project Connect plan, the airport is planned to be the southern terminus of the Capital Metropolitan Transportation Authority Blue Line light rail, which will run through the East Riverside Corridor to Downtown Austin and The University of Texas at Austin as far north as North Lamar/US183. Blue Line construction costs are estimated at $1.3 billion and may be completed as early as 2029. The project (Proposition A) was approved by voters on November 3, 2020.

The airport offers a consolidated rent-a-car center (ConRAC) in a parking garage northeast of the Barbara Jordan Terminal and connected to the Red Garage. Ten rental car companies have passenger service counters on the second floor of the ConRAC, which can service up to 5,000 vehicles per day. The 1.6 million ft^{2} (150,000 m^{2}) facility opened in October 2015 and was built at a cost of US$162 million. A shuttle bus travels between the South Terminal and the ConRAC.

Part of the ConRAC's ground floor serves as a "Ground Transportation Center" providing passengers access to taxis and ridesharing companies including Uber and Lyft.

== Airlines and destinations ==
=== Passenger ===
| Airlines | Destinations |
|---|---|
| Aeroméxico | Seasonal: Mexico City–Benito Juárez |
| Aeroméxico Connect | Mexico City–Benito Juárez |
| Air Canada | Montréal–Trudeau, Toronto–Pearson; Seasonal: Vancouver |
| Air Canada Rouge | Seasonal: Toronto–Pearson |
| Alaska Airlines | Portland (OR), San Diego, Seattle/Tacoma; Seasonal: Anchorage (begins June 12, 2027) |
| Allegiant Air | Cincinnati, Des Moines, Grand Rapids, Provo; Seasonal: Asheville, Knoxville, Las Vegas, Sarasota |
| American Airlines | Cancún, Charlotte, Chicago–O'Hare, Dallas/Fort Worth, Los Angeles, Miami, New York–JFK, Philadelphia, Phoenix–Sky Harbor, San José del Cabo |
| American Eagle | Chicago–O'Hare, Dallas/Fort Worth, Los Angeles; Seasonal: Aspen |
| British Airways | London–Heathrow |
| Cayman Airways | Seasonal: Grand Cayman |
| Copa Airlines | Panama City–Tocumen |
| Delta Air Lines | Atlanta, Boston, Cancún, Detroit, Las Vegas, Los Angeles, Miami, Minneapolis/St. Paul, New York–JFK, Orlando, Salt Lake City, San Diego (begins April 12, 2027), San Francisco, San Jose (CA), Seattle/Tacoma, Tampa; Seasonal: Fort Myers, Paris–Charles de Gaulle (begins March 27, 2027), San José del Cabo |
| Delta Connection | Cincinnati, Columbus–Glenn, Denver, Fayetteville/Bentonville (begins March 8, 2027), Indianapolis, Jacksonville (FL), Kansas City, McAllen, Minneapolis/St. Paul, Nashville, Panama City (FL), Phoenix–Sky Harbor, Raleigh/Durham, Salt Lake City; Seasonal: Asheville, Bozeman, Glacier Park/Kalispell, Palm Springs |
| Frontier Airlines | Atlanta, Denver, Las Vegas, Orlando, Phoenix–Sky Harbor |
| JetBlue | Boston, Fort Lauderdale |
| KLM | Amsterdam |
| Lufthansa | Frankfurt |
| Porter Airlines | Toronto–Pearson |
| Southwest Airlines | Albuquerque, Amarillo, Atlanta, Baltimore, Boston, Burbank, Cancún, Chicago–Midway, Cincinnati, Columbus–Glenn, Dallas–Love, Denver, Detroit (begins March 11, 2027), El Paso, Fort Lauderdale, Harlingen, Houston–Hobby, Indianapolis, Jacksonville (FL), Kansas City, Las Vegas, Long Beach, Los Angeles, Lubbock, Memphis, Miami, Midland/Odessa, Milwaukee, Minneapolis/St. Paul, Nashville, New Orleans, Oakland, Oklahoma City, Ontario, Orlando, Phoenix–Sky Harbor, Pittsburgh, Raleigh/Durham, Sacramento, Salt Lake City, San Diego, San Francisco, San Jose (CA), San José (CR) (begins March 13, 2027), Seattle/Tacoma, St. Louis, Tampa, Tulsa, Washington–National; Seasonal: Bozeman (begins June 5, 2027), Charleston (SC), Fort Myers, Hayden/Steamboat Springs, Knoxville, Liberia (CR) (begins June 5, 2027), Montrose, Nassau (begins June 5, 2027), Omaha, Palm Springs, Panama City (FL), Pensacola, Portland (OR) (begins June 3, 2027), Punta Cana (begins June 5, 2027), Reno/Tahoe, San José del Cabo, San Juan, Santa Rosa, Sarasota (begins June 5, 2027), Savannah (begins June 5, 2027) |
| United Airlines | Chicago–O'Hare, Denver, Houston–Intercontinental, Los Angeles, Newark, San Francisco, Washington–Dulles |
| United Express | Houston–Intercontinental, Los Angeles; Seasonal: Chicago–O'Hare |
| Viva | Monterrey |
| WestJet | Seasonal: Calgary |

== Statistics ==
=== Top destinations ===
Busiest domestic routes from AUS (September 2025 – August 2026)
| Rank | City | Passengers | Carriers |
|---|---|---|---|
| 1 | Denver, Colorado | 653,054 | Delta, Frontier, Southwest, United |
| 2 | Atlanta, Georgia | 629,252 | Delta, Frontier, Southwest |
| 3 | Dallas/Fort Worth, Texas | 564,879 | American |
| 4 | Los Angeles, California | 442,238 | American, Delta, Southwest, United |
| 5 | Phoenix–Sky Harbor, Arizona | 421,538 | American, Frontier, Southwest |
| 6 | Las Vegas, Nevada | 391,325 | Delta, Frontier, Southwest |
| 7 | Chicago–O'Hare, Illinois | 380,602 | American, Frontier, Southwest, United |
| 8 | San Francisco, California | 361,666 | Alaska, Delta, Southwest, United |
| 9 | Orlando, Florida | 352,006 | Delta, Frontier, Southwest, Spirit |
| 10 | Houston–Intercontinental, Texas | 321,647 | United |

Busiest international routes from AUS (September 2025 – August 2026)
| Rank | Airport | Passengers | Carriers |
|---|---|---|---|
| 1 | London–Heathrow, United Kingdom | 256,503 | British Airways |
| 2 | Cancún, Mexico | 208,044 | American, Delta, Southwest |
| 3 | Mexico City, Mexico | 94,358 | Aeroméxico |
| 4 | Frankfurt, Germany | 89,933 | Lufthansa |
| 5 | Amsterdam, Netherlands | 77,954 | KLM |
| 6 | Toronto–Pearson, Canada | 74,964 | Air Canada, Air Canada Rouge |
| 7 | San José del Cabo, Mexico | 68,648 | American, Southwest |
| 8 | Panama City–Tocumen, Panama | 60,967 | Copa Airlines |
| 9 | Monterrey, Mexico | 50,994 | Viva |
| 10 | Montréal, Canada | 26,867 | Air Canada, Air Canada Rouge |

=== Airline market share ===
Largest airlines at AUS (September 2025 – August 2026)
| Rank | Airline | Passengers | Share |
|---|---|---|---|
| 1 | Southwest Airlines | 9,160,018 | 41.4% |
| 2 | Delta Air Lines | 4,081,557 | 18.5% |
| 3 | American Airlines | 3,396,096 | 15.4% |
| 4 | United Airlines | 2,773,038 | 12.5% |
| 5 | Alaska Airlines | 662,016 | 3.0% |
| – | Others | 2,000,000 | 9.2% |

=== Annual traffic ===
Annual passenger traffic at AUS; 1999–present
| Year | Passengers | Year | Passengers | Year | Passengers |
|---|---|---|---|---|---|
| 1999 | 6,644,482(a) | 2009 | 8,220,898 | 2019 | 17,343,729 |
| 2000 | 7,642,341 | 2010 | 8,652,480 | 2020 | 6,472,579 |
| 2001 | 7,181,190 | 2011 | 9,085,203 | 2021 | 13,570,771 |
| 2002 | 6,720,668 | 2012 | 9,436,197 | 2022 | 21,089,289 |
| 2003 | 6,706,385 | 2013 | 10,027,694 | 2023 | 22,095,876 |
| 2004 | 7,238,645 | 2014 | 10,719,320 | 2024 | 21,762,904 |
| 2005 | 7,683,545 | 2015 | 11,902,874 | 2025 | 21,666,852 |
| 2006 | 8,261,310 | 2016 | 12,439,788 | 2026 | |
| 2007 | 8,885,391 | 2017 | 13,889,305 | 2027 | |
| 2008 | 9,039,075 | 2018 | 15,819,912 | 2028 | |

Note:(a); Includes passenger totals at Robert Mueller Municipal Airport for January–May 1999.

== Accidents and incidents ==
- March 1, 2002: During an instrument landing system (ILS) approach in bad weather, a Beechcraft A36 Bonanza, registration number N7236L, crashed on airport grounds and burned out after the pilot initiated a missed approach. The aircraft was destroyed and the pilot and single passenger were killed. The accident was attributed to "The pilot's failure to maintain airspeed, resulting in a stall. Contributing factors were the low ceiling, fog, and the unforecast weather conditions."
- December 7, 2009: A Piper PA-46-500TP, registration number N600YE, impacted terrain near Mendoza, Texas, in a steep descending right turn during an ILS approach in low visibility, substantially damaging the aircraft and killing the pilot and single passenger. Immediately prior to the crash, an air traffic controller had instructed the pilot to perform a "combination of descending turns" and "heading changes [that] were rapid [and] of large magnitude..." Additionally, post-crash toxicological tests of the pilot found evidence of diphenhydramine, a sedating antihistamine. The accident was attributed to "The pilot's spatial disorientation, which resulted in his loss of airplane control. Contributing to the pilot's spatial disorientation was the sequence and timing of the instructions issued by the air traffic controller. The pilot's operation of the airplane after using impairing medication may also have contributed."
- May 7, 2020: An adult male pedestrian trespassed on the airport's runway 17R and was hit and killed by Flight 1392, a Boeing 737-700 operated by Southwest Airlines, as it landed. There were no injuries to passengers or crew, but the plane sustained damage to its left engine nacelle. The victim was not authorized to be on the runway at the time.
