= Corpus Christi International Airport =

Airport in Corpus Christi, Texas, United States

- IATA: CRP; ICAO: KCRP; FAA LID: CRP

Summary
- Airport type: Public
- Owner: City of Corpus Christi
- Operator: Corpus Christi Department of Aviation
- Serves: Corpus Christi, Texas
- Elevation AMSL: 44 ft (13 m)
- Coordinates: 27°46′13″N 097°30′04″W
- Website: corpuschristiairport.com

Map
- Location within Texas Location within the United States

Runways
Direction	Length		Surface
Direction	ft	m	Surface
13/31	7,510	2,289	Asphalt
18/36	6,080	1,853	Asphalt

Statistics (2024)
- Aircraft operations: 74,268
- Based aircraft (2020): 65
- Total Passengers: 727,000
- Source: Federal Aviation Administration

Corpus Christi International Airport (IATA: CRP, ICAO: KCRP, FAA LID: CRP) is a public airport located 6 miles (5.2 nmi; 9.7 km) west of Corpus Christi, in Nueces County, Texas.Their phone number is +1 (361) 826-3232 It opened in 1960, replacing Cliff Maus airport at 27.767°N 97.44°W, where the Lozano Golf Center is now located.

The airport's six-gate 165,000 sq ft (15,300 m^{2}) Hayden Wilson Head Terminal, designed by Gensler, opened on November 3, 2002, with a theme of "When the Sun Meets the Sea."

The Corpus Christi International Airport has tried to attract airline service from Mexico. In 1974, Texas International Airlines was flying Douglas DC-9-10s between Corpus Christi and Mexico City via McAllen, TX, and DC-9s twice a week to Tampico and Veracruz via McAllen in 1975. In 1967, Mexicana de Aviacion Douglas DC-6s flew direct to Mexico City via Monterrey three days a week.

With the arrival of the Chautauqua Airlines operating United Express flights with Canadair CRJ200 regional jets via a code sharing agreement with United Airlines (with Chautauqua operating a number of United Express flights into the airport at the time), the airline established a crew base with about 75 pilots and flight attendants in Corpus Christi. However, Chautauqua then closed this crew base in November 2008 with the airline ceasing to operate United Express flights from Corpus Christi. In May 2016, all United Express flights at Corpus Christi were being operated by Mesa Airlines with Embraer ERJ-175 regional jets or by ExpressJet with Embraer ERJ-145 regional jets.

The Dallas Love Field-Corpus Christi nonstop route operated by Southwest Airlines began on August 10, 2019, with one daily round-trip flight between the cities each Saturday. Southwest last flew the route nonstop in 1986, until 2024, when the flight was reinstated seasonally from June 8, 2024, to August 3, 2024.

Corpus Christi International Airport is included in the Federal Aviation Administration (FAA) National Plan of Integrated Airport Systems for 2023-2027, in which it is categorized as a non-hub primary commercial service facility.

== Facilities ==
The Corpus Christi International Airport covers 2,457 acres (994 ha) at an elevation of 44 feet (13 m). It has two asphalt runways: 13/31 is 7,510 by 150 feet (2,289 by 46 m) and 18/36 is 6,080 by 150 feet (1,853 by 46 m).

In 2017, the airport had 97,012 aircraft operations, an average of 266 per day: 66% military, 18% general aviation, 8% air taxi, and 8% commercial airline. In April 2020, there were 65 aircraft based at this airport: 28 single-engine, 24 multi-engine, 9 jets, 3 helicopters, and 1 glider.

CCIA offers shopping and dining facilities including the Gulf Coast Capital Bar and Grill and Island Joes' Coffee Shop. There is also a local brewery, Nueces Brewing, located in the terminal. The airport also offers pickup or ride services, and there are multiple companies such as American Cab, Dependable Taxi Cab, and Express Cab for taxi options as well as ride share services such as Lyft and Uber. CCIA also offers refueling services that offer various types of jet fuel.

== Airlines and destinations ==
Corpus Christi International Airport has six gates, two of which (Gates 4 and 6) have direct access to the U.S. Customs office. The airport has five jetways with the sixth gate using stairs to reach the aircraft parking ramp.

=== Passenger ===
Airlines	Destinations
American Eagle	Dallas/Fort Worth
Southwest Airlines	Houston–Hobby
United Express	Houston–Intercontinental

=== Cargo ===
Airlines	Destinations
Ameriflight	Midland/Odessa, San Antonio

Destinations map
Destinations from Corpus Christi International Airport

=== Top destinations ===
Busiest domestic routes from CRP (June 2025 – May 2026)
Rank	Airports	Passengers	Carriers
1	Dallas/Ft Worth, Texas	144,610	American
2	Houston–Intercontinental, Texas	112,120	United
3	Houston–Hobby, Texas	94,770	Southwest
4	Dallas–Love, Texas	8,430	Southwest

American Airlines currently operates all flights to Corpus Christi on Envoy Air Embraer E-175 regional jets.

All Southwest Airlines flights at Corpus Christi are flown with various Boeing 737 models; Southwest is the only airline to serve Corpus Christi with year-round mainline jet service.

United Express flights to Houston–Intercontinental are operated by Mesa Airlines Embraer ERJ-175s, CommuteAir Embraer ERJ-145 or SkyWest Airlines Bombardier CRJ-200s.

== Past airline service ==
Braniff International Airways, Eastern Air Lines, Pan American World Airways (Pan Am) and Trans-Texas Airways (predecessor of Texas International Airlines) all served Corpus Christi's old and new airports over the years.

In 1935, Braniff Lockheed Model 10 Electras flew Brownsville - Corpus Christi - San Antonio - Austin - Waco - Fort Worth - Dallas Love Field. In 1940, a Braniff Douglas DC-3 flew Brownsville - Corpus Christi - San Antonio - Austin - Fort Worth - Dallas Love Field - Oklahoma City - Ponca City, OK - Wichita - Kansas City - Chicago.

Eastern arrived at Corpus Christi in April 1939 with direct DC-3 flights from New York Newark Airport via a number of enroute stops with this service connecting to Pan Am's flight to Mexico City. In 1958, Eastern Convair 440s flew Brownsville - Corpus Christi - Houston Hobby - Beaumont/Port Arthur - Lake Charles - Lafayette - Baton Rouge - New Orleans - Mobile - Pensacola - Montgomery - Birmingham - Atlanta.

Pan American World Airways (Pan Am) was flying Douglas DC-3s between Houston and Mexico City via Corpus Christi in 1947 with a daily roundtrip routing of Houston Hobby Airport (HOU) - Corpus Christi - Brownsville - Tampico - Mexico City with the airline having a name for this international service, being the "Sun Ray Clipper". According to the November 1, 1947 Pan Am system timetable, the southbound "Sun Ray Clipper" flight overnighted in Mexico City and then operated continuing service the next day on a southbound routing of Mexico City - Guatemala City, Guatemala - Managua, Nicaragua - San Jose, Costa Rica - Balboa, Panama with return northbound service from Balboa to Houston via Corpus Christi being operated on the same routing in reverse with an overnight stop being made in Mexico City as well. However, Pan Am was no longer serving Corpus Christi by 1950 although the airline would return to the airport with jet service by the mid-1980s.

Trans-Texas Airways (TTa) arrived in 1950; in 1952, its Douglas DC-3s flew a multi-stop routing of Brownsville - Harlingen - McAllen - Alice - Corpus Christi - Beeville - Victoria - Houston. By 1963, most TTa flights to the airport were operated with Convair 240s direct to Houston, Dallas, San Antonio, Austin, Fort Worth, Harlingen, McAllen, and Victoria; TTa DC-3s also flew a routing of Corpus Christi - San Antonio - San Angelo - Midland/Odessa - Pecos - El Paso. By 1969, TTa had changed its name to Texas International Airlines, which continued to serve Corpus Christi with McDonnell Douglas DC-9 jet service

Scheduled jets arrived in the spring of 1965: Eastern Boeing 727-100s nonstop to Houston Hobby Airport and Braniff International BAC One-Elevens nonstop to both Houston Hobby Airport and San Antonio with the Braniff jet service continuing on to Dallas. In 1965, the primary runway was just 5600 feet long. In 1966, Braniff was operating Lockheed L-188 Electra propjets on a routing of Corpus Christi - Houston Hobby Airport - Dallas Love Field - Oklahoma City - Wichita - Kansas City - Chicago O'Hare Airport. Also in 1966, Trans-Texas Airways introduced nonstop Douglas DC-9-10 jet service to Houston Hobby Airport in addition to Convair 600 turboprop flights nonstop to Houston, San Antonio, and Harlingen. In 1968, TTa was operating nonstop DC-9 jet service to both Harlingen and Houston Hobby Airport.

In 1966-67 Mexicana de Aviacion, a Mexican-based air carrier, was operating Douglas DC-6 propliners on nonstop international service to Monterrey, Mexico three days a week with this flight then continuing on to Mexico City.

Following its name change from Trans-Texas Airways (TTa), in 1974 Texas International Airlines was operating daily DC-9 jet service between Corpus Christi and Mexico City via McAllen as well as direct DC-9 flights to Denver and Salt Lake City via Houston Intercontinental Airport (IAH) or San Antonio. Also in 1974, three airlines were operating nonstop jet service to Houston (IAH): Braniff Boeing 727-100s and 727-200s, Eastern Boeing 727-200s, and Texas International Douglas DC-9-10s with Braniff 727s also flying nonstop to Dallas/Fort Worth International Airport (DFW).

The February 1, 1976 Official Airline Guide (OAG) lists Eastern Boeing 727-200s from Corpus Christi nonstop to New Orleans and also nonstop to Houston with both flights continuing on to Atlanta. Also in 1976, Braniff was operating three direct Boeing 727 flights a day to Chicago O'Hare, all via Dallas/Fort Worth. The same year, Texas International DC-9s flew direct to Los Angeles (LAX) via stops in Houston, Dallas/Fort Worth, Midland/Odessa, Roswell, NM, and Albuquerque.

Southwest Airlines began serving Corpus Christi on March 1, 1977, as an intrastate airline and in 1979 was operating six Boeing 737-200s a day nonstop to Houston Hobby Airport (HOU); it also flew nonstop to Dallas Love Field on weekends. In 1979, Braniff had ended nonstop service to Houston but was flying four nonstop 727s a day to Dallas/Fort Worth while Eastern 727s and Texas International DC-9s still flew nonstop to Houston Intercontinental (IAH). In 1981, Eastern McDonnell Douglas DC-9-30s flew nonstop to Atlanta.

In 1982, Braniff International went out of business while Texas International was merged into Continental Airlines. American Airlines arrived in 1981; in 1983, American Boeing 727-100s and 727-200s flew nonstop to Dallas/Fort Worth (DFW) with a total of three flights a day with an American 727-200 also flying to DFW via a stop in Austin. Continental had four daily 727 and DC-9 nonstops to Houston Intercontinental (IAH) while Pan Am Express operated by Emerald Air via a code sharing agreement with Pan Am operated three Douglas DC-9-10s a day to IAH. By 1984, Austin-based Emerald Air was operating as an independent carrier with up to ten DC-9 jet and Fairchild Hiller FH-227 turboprop departures a day nonstop to Dallas/Fort Worth (DFW), Houston (IAH), and McAllen.

United Airlines arrived in 1984 but then pulled out in 1987; in 1985, United was operating two direct flights a day to Denver with both services making a stop in Austin with Boeing 727-100s and 727-200s being flown on the route. United would return to Corpus Christi following its merger with Continental Airlines.

Pan Am returned to Corpus Christi in 1985 but then discontinued its flights in 1986; its Boeing 727-200s first operated Corpus Christi - Dallas/Fort Worth - New York Kennedy Airport (JFK) service with the airline subsequently operating Corpus Christi - Houston Intercontinental - Washington Dulles Airport (IAD) flights. Also in 1985, Eastern was operating a daily Boeing 727-200 service on a routing of Corpus Christi - San Antonio - Atlanta - New York LaGuardia Airport - Montreal; however, Eastern had pulled out of Corpus Christi by 1987.

In 1989, American Airlines had five daily McDonnell Douglas MD-80 nonstops to Dallas/Fort Worth while Continental and Continental Express were operating a total of six nonstops a day to Houston Intercontinental (Continental with Boeing 727-100s, 727-200s and Douglas DC-9-10s, and Continental Express with Britt Airways ATR 42s) while Southwest was flying eight nonstops a day to Houston Hobby with Boeing 737-200s and 737-300s.

Delta Air Lines arrived in 1990. In 1991, Delta had three Boeing 737-200s a day nonstop to its Dallas/Fort Worth hub, while American, and American Eagle had a total of seven nonstops a day to DFW, American with MD-80s and American Eagle with Saab 340s. In 1993, Delta turned its Corpus Christi-Dallas/Fort Worth service over to Delta Connection flown by Atlantic Southeast Airlines ATR 72s and Embraer EMB-120 Brasilia turboprops operated via a code sharing agreement with Delta while American was operating Fokker 100 jets to DFW until 1995-96 when American Eagle ATR 72 turboprops took over. In 1999, Delta Connection operated by Atlantic Southeast Airlines Canadair CRJ-200 regional jets were flying nonstop to Atlanta. Also in 1999, Continental was operating one mainline jet flight a day to Houston Intercontinental (IAH) while Continental Express flying nine nonstops a day to Houston (IAH) with Embraer ERJ-145 regional jets and ATR 42 turboprops. In 2010 Continental merged with United Airlines and the Continental Express service from Corpus Christi then began to be operated as United Express.

In 1970, Rio Airways, which was operating as an independent commuter air carrier at the time, was based in Corpus Christi where it operated a hub with nonstop service to the Texas cities of Austin, Brownsville, Houston, Laredo, McAllen and San Antonio flown with Beechcraft 99 turboprops.

Several other independent commuter airlines served Corpus Christi from the 1970s to the 1990s with small turboprop and prop aircraft, including

- Austin Express operating Fairchild Swearingen Metroliners
- Conquest Airlines operating Beechcraft 1900Cs and Fairchild Swearingen Metroliners
- Metro Airlines operating Short 330s
- Tejas Airlines operating Fairchild Swearingen Metroliners and Piper Navajos
- Texas National Airlines operating Piper Navajos

There were plans in 2007 to get facilities made to better help get more cargo from other states to Texas quicker and more productively. It was also so that the city would not be losing out on business as the closest place that has a cargo landing is in Laredo, Texas. U.S Customs and border protection ultimately came up and said that the facilities would have to be made in order for any consideration in the transport of foreign goods could happen.

June 3, 2010 was an economically challenging time in the Airport's history as the airport was losing business due to multiple airlines removing their flights to and from the Airport. this caused Corpus to lose substantial business and fall into a little debt. The Airport was using customers fees to keep the Airport afloat.

== See also ==
- List of airports in Texas
