= Conquest Airlines =

Regional airline of the United States (1988–1997)

IATA	ICAO	Call sign
5C	CAC	CONQUEST
- Commenced operations: April 1988; 38 years ago
- Ceased operations: July 28, 1997; 29 years ago
- Hubs: Robert Mueller Municipal Airport
- Fleet size: See Fleet below
- Destinations: See Destinations below
- Parent company: Air L.A. Inc. after 1995
- Headquarters: Austin, Texas, United States
- Key people: Rafael Rivas (Executive vice president); Victor Rivas
- Employees: 78 in 1989

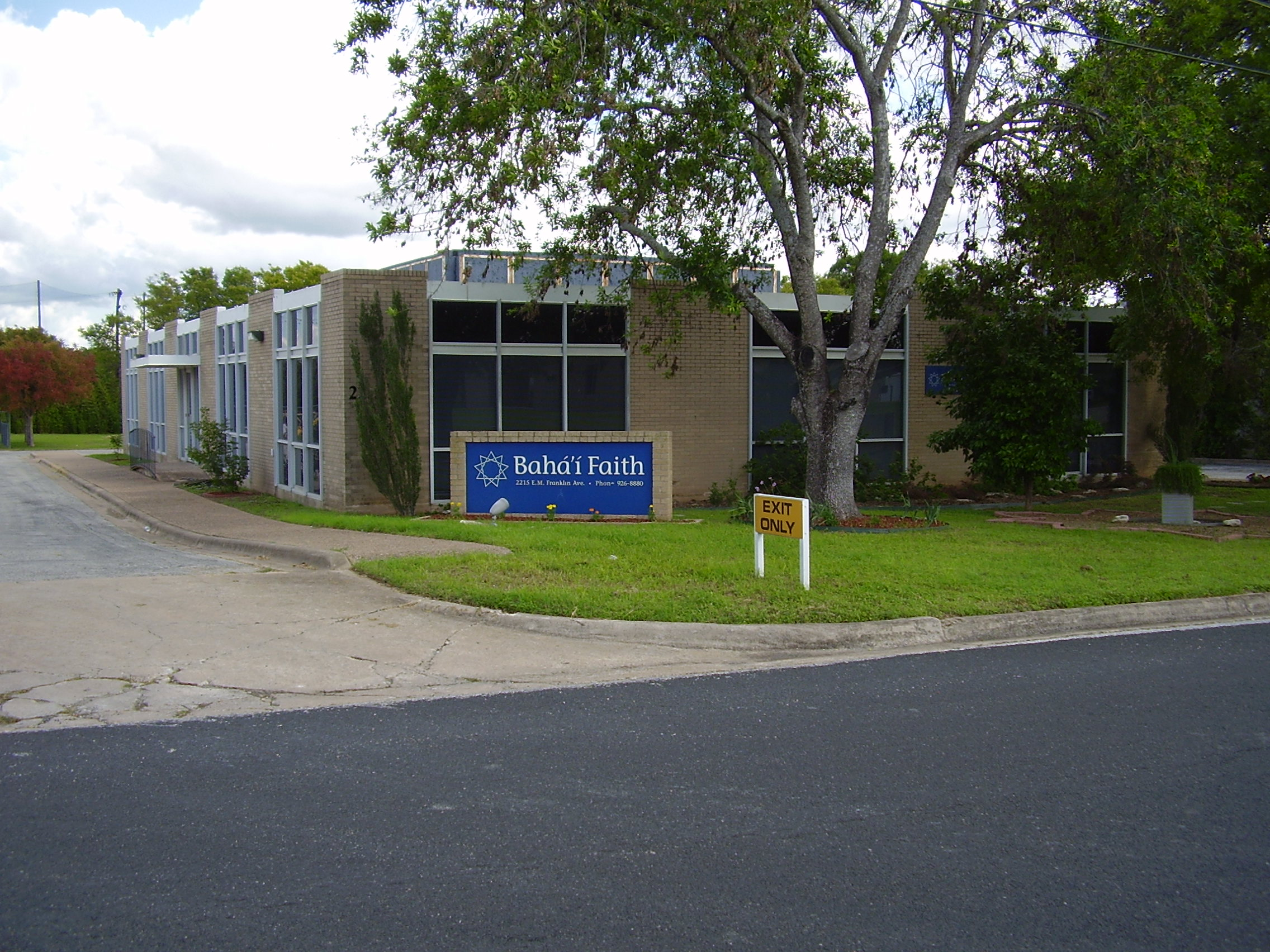
The former Conquest Airlines building in Austin, Texas, is now a Baháʼí Faith building

Conquest Airlines was an American regional airline initially headquartered in Jefferson County, Texas, and later headquartered in Austin, Texas. Conquest operated primarily on routes within Texas from its hub in Austin (at the now closed Robert Mueller Municipal Airport).

== History ==
In 1983 Rafael and Aggie Rivas began discussing the need to improve transportation for Texans, which led to Rafael Rivas' vision of a commuter he called Conquest. Soon after Rafael Rivas and Victor Rivas, brothers from Queens, New York City, began building on that concept, procuring investments and starting what became Conquest Airlines. The airline began in April 1988 with flights from Beaumont-Port Arthur, Texas to Austin and Dallas; the airline later added Corpus Christi, McAllen, and San Antonio. In the late 1980s the airline shifted its hub and operations to Austin. Rafael Rivas, who became the executive vice president of Conquest, said that the airline chose Austin as its hub since Dallas and Houston were not centrally located in Texas. Rivas added that by being located in Austin, the airline would avoid competition from regional airline carriers operating in Houston and the Dallas-Fort Worth areas. In addition the airline catered to passengers traveling within Texas instead of passengers planning to do inter-state travel. Rivas added that his airline did not intend to compete with Southwest Airlines; it intended to compete with the automobile. Around November 1989 the airline's aircraft carried 21,000 passengers on 2,500 trips per month.

Conquest originally had its headquarters on the grounds of Southeast Texas Regional Airport in unincorporated Jefferson County, Texas, Texas. Conquest planned to move its headquarters to Austin in the beginning of 1990. In 1989 Conquest moved its corporate headquarters, 78 employees, and six aircraft to Austin. The City of Austin granted its first ever tax abatement in exchange for the relocation of the corporate headquarters. The abatement relieved the airline of about $1.3 million worth of aircraft property taxes over a 7-year period. Austin politicians said that the relocation of Conquest would lead to the employment of 200 Austinites at Conquest for at least 14 years and a $47 tax base that would contribute to the stabilization of property values after the end of the abatement.

In 1991, the Airline expanded its network and began international flights between San Antonio, TX and Monterrey, Mexico. The company promoted John W. Jones as the Director of Stations, who was instrumental in mapping the company's growth as an international airline. Unfortunately the economic conditions generated by the first Gulf War prevented the airline from continuing flights into Mexico and the international service was suspended. Aeromexico's regional airline, Aerolitoral was already operating flights between San Antonio, TX and Monterry, Mexico. The market was not large enough to sustain the additional capacity offered by Conquest Airlines. Jones later went on in 1994 to manage the international operations for Aerolitoral (today known as Aeromexico Connect).

The airline expanded throughout the Southeastern United States and in 1993 opened a hub in Birmingham, Alabama. From Birmingham, the company offered flights to Little Rock (AR), Mobile (AL), Atlanta (GA), Greenville (SC) and Charleston (SC). The airline connected both hubs with service via an Austin-Tyler-Little Rock-Birmingham route. In 1993 the airline had 16 aircraft and 300 employees. Afterwards the airline's business declined. During a point in which the airline had about one and one half years of the abatement left, officials from the airline and the City of Austin acknowledged that the airline may fail as a company. In an attempt to survive, the airline removed 100 employees and 10 aircraft. In 1994 Conquest's tax base was appraised at $4.7 million.

In 1995 Conquest Industries sold the airline subsidiary to Air L.A. Inc. The new owners terminated Conquest's operations on July 28, 1997 and relocated the company to Oklahoma.

The former Conquest Airlines building in Austin is now a Baháʼí Faith building.

== Fleet ==
Originally the airline operated 19-seat Beechcraft B-1900Cs. The aircraft were not equipped with toilets. In March 1994, the airline operated a fleet of Fairchild Swearingen Metroliners, seating 19 passengers.

== Destinations ==
It served the following Texas cities: Abilene, Amarillo, Austin, Beaumont, Corpus Christi, Dallas Love Field, Greenville/Spartenburg SC, Charleston SC, Birmingham, AL, Harlingen, Houston (Sugar Land Regional Airport), Laredo, McAllen, Nacogdoches (service to Austin), San Antonio, San Angelo, and Tyler. Conquest also served New Orleans.

== See also ==
- List of defunct airlines of the United States
