= Best Airlines =

US airline 1982–1986

| IATA | ICAO | Call sign |
|---|---|---|
| IW | BST | — |
- Founded: June 28, 1982; 43 years ago
- Ceased operations: 1986; 40 years ago
- Fleet size: 3
- Destinations: 6
- Headquarters: Covington, Kentucky
- Employees: 100

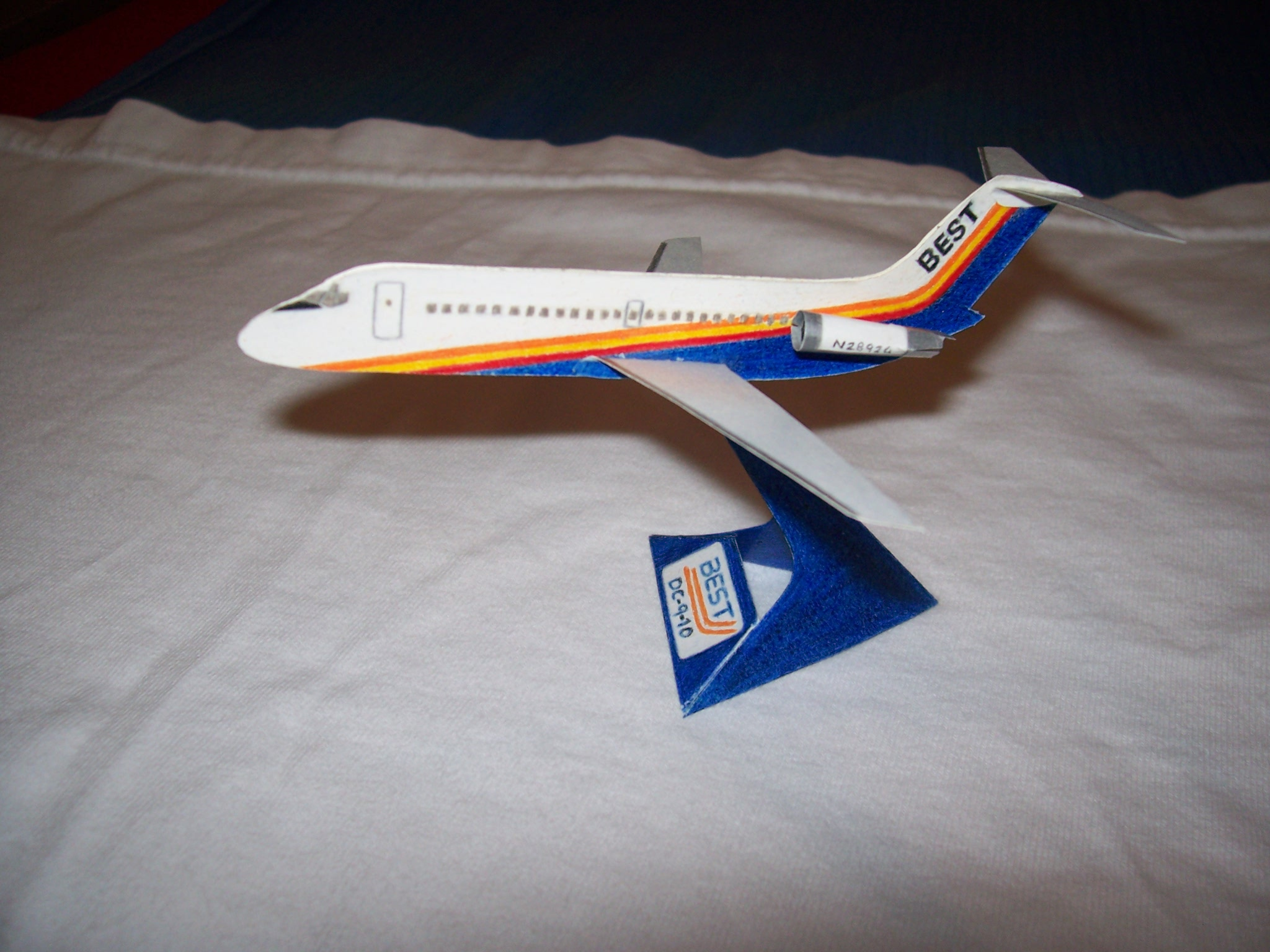
Model of Best Airlines DC-9-10 Aircraft

Best Airlines was a small airline that flew to a miscellaneous and changing group of cities in the Mid-Atlantic United States in the mid-1980s. Their headquarters was in the Covington, Kentucky area which is near the Cincinnati-Northern Kentucky International Airport. The May 15, 1983 timetable indicates headquarters in Florence, KY and the January 7, 1985 timetable indicates headquarters in Ft. Mitchell, KY. According to the Official Airline Guide (OAG), the two letter airline code for Best was "IW".

The airline operated a small fleet of Douglas DC-9-10 jetliners, an aircraft which seats about 75 passengers. Their aircraft were painted in a striking livery. A diagonal cheatline with orange, yellow, and red stripes divided a white top from a blue bottom. The arrangement ran up the middle of the tail with the word "Best" in black letters on the white section.

Flight International Magazine's 1985 "World Aviation Directory" includes a short entry for the airline. It lists Best as an FAA regulated Part 121 air carrier established on June 28, 1982, with headquarters located at 207 Grandview Dr., Ft. Mitchell, KY, 41017. The airline's president is listed as William C. Yung, and its executive vice-president as C. Michael Dacy, and its treasurer as James W. Thelen. The airline is listed as having 100 employees and two aircraft. The airline did not operate a hub and spoke route system via any specific airport but instead primarily operated point-to-point flights and also added and dropped a number of destinations during its existence.

== Destinations ==
The September 13, 1982 timetable indicated the airline served the following airports:

- Albany International Airport, NY (ALB)
- Buffalo-Niagara International Airport, NY (BUF)
- Cincinnati/Northern Kentucky International Airport, KY (CVG)
- Greensboro/Winston-Salem/High Point, NC - Piedmont Triad International Airport (GSO)
- Hartford, CT/Springfield, MA - Bradley International Airport (BDL)
- Memphis International Airport, TN (MEM)
- Nashville International Airport, TN (BNA)
- Raleigh-Durham International Airport, NC (RDU)
- Tampa International Airport, FL (TPA)
- Palm Beach International Airport, FL (PBI)

The May 15, 1983 timetable indicated the airline served the following airports:

- Buffalo-Niagara International Airport, NY (BUF)
- Detroit Metropolitan Airport, MI (DTW)
- Hartford, CT/Springfield, MA - Bradley International Airport (BDL)
- Philadelphia International Airport, PA (PHL)
- Greensboro/Winston-Salem/High Point, NC - Piedmont Triad International Airport (GSO)
- Raleigh-Durham International Airport, NC (RDU)
- Greater Rochester International Airport, NY (ROC)

The January 15, 1984 Best Airlines timetable lists the following destinations being served:

- Alexandria, LA - Esler Regional Airport (ESF)
- Atlanta International Airport, GA (ATL)
- Buffalo-Niagara International Airport, NY (BUF)
- Cleveland International Airport, OH (CLE)
- Dallas/Fort Worth International Airport, TX (DFW)
- Detroit Metropolitan Airport, MI (DTW)
- Hartford, CT/Springfield, MA - Bradley International Airport (BDL)
- Greater Rochester International Airport, NY (ROC)

Service had been discontinued to Greensboro/Winston-Salem/Highpoint, Philadelphia and Raleigh/Durham by this time but had been added to Alexandria, Atlanta, Cleveland and Dallas/Fort Worth.

Their January 7, 1985 timetable lists the following destinations being served:

- Cleveland Hopkins International Airport, OH (CLE)
- Detroit Metropolitan Airport, MI (DTW)
- Hartford, CT/Springfield, MA - Bradley International Airport (BDL)
- Philadelphia International Airport, PA (PHL)
- Greater Rochester International Airport, NY (ROC)
- Syracuse Hancock International Airport, NY (SYR)

Service to Alexandria, Atlanta, Buffalo and Dallas/Fort Worth had been dropped by this time but had been reinstated to Philadelphia with Syracuse also being added. By March 4, 1985, the Best Airlines timetable listed one additional destination being served by this time, being Columbus, Ohio via the Port Columbus International Airport (now John Glenn Columbus International Airport) (CMH), in addition to the above six airports.

Route maps for the airline during the 1980s show routes and destinations being added and dropped on a regular basis during its existence:

The September 13, 1982 timetable shows two separate linear routings using aggressive schedules and short stops of typically 10–20 minutes. One DC-9 jet operated Cincinnati (CVG) - Buffalo (BUF) - Albany (ALB) - Hartford (BDL) - West Palm Beach (PBI) in the morning and the reverse route in the afternoon back to Cincinnati (CVG) where finally it did a late evening Cincinnati (CVG) - Tampa (TPA) - Cincinnati (CVG) trip. A second DC-9 jet operated Raleigh (RDU) -Greensboro (GSO) - Nashville (BNA) - Memphis (MEM) - Nashville (BNA) - Greensboro (GSO) - Raleigh (RDU) - Tampa (TPA) in the morning and the reverse route in the afternoon/evening.

The March 1983 Best Airlines route map shows DC-9 jet service being flown nonstop between Philadelphia (PHL) and four different airports including Detroit (DTW), Greensboro/Winston-Salem/High Point (GSO), Hartford/Springfield (BDL) and Raleigh/Durham (RDU) as well as a linear service being operated on a routing of Hartford/Springfield (BDL) - Buffalo (BUF) - Detroit (DTW) - Cleveland (CLE).

The May 1, 1984 route map for the airline shows DC-9 jet service being flown nonstop between Hartford/Springfield (BDL) and four different airports including Buffalo (BUF), Cleveland (CLE), Detroit (DTW) and Rochester (ROC) as well as nonstop service between Atlanta (ATL) and three small cities including Alexandria, LA (ESF), Gulfport/Biloxi, MS (GPT) and Roanoke, VA (ROA) with this same route map also showing point-to-point nonstop service being operated Buffalo-Rochester, Buffalo-Detroit, Detroit-Cleveland and Alexandria-Gulfport/Biloxi.

The March 4, 1985 route map shows DC-9 service being operated nonstop between Philadelphia (PHL) and four different airports including Columbus (CMH), Hartford/Springfield (BDL), Rochester (ROC) and Syracuse (SYR) in addition to nonstop flights between Hartford/Springfield (BDL) and two different airports including Cleveland (CLE) and Detroit (DTW) as well as point-to-point nonstop service being operated Cleveland-Detroit and Rochester-Syracuse.

The September 1, 1985 route map shows DC-9 service being operated between Hartford/Springfield (BDL) and four destinations including Cleveland (CLE), Columbus (CMH), Detroit (DTW) and Philadelphia (PHL) as well as point-to-point nonstop service being operated Cleveland-Detroit.

By 1988, Best was flying DC-9 service on a routing of Atlanta (ATL) - Roanoke (ROA) - New York Newark Airport (EWR) according to the Official Airline Guide (OAG).

The airline appears to have had no more than three or four flights a day, and sometimes as few as one, from the airports it served. In 1983, 1984 and 1985, a hub and spoke connecting system was not operated and there appears to have been no clear pattern concerning their choice of markets.

During its operation Best Airlines operated 4× Douglas DC-9-10 aircraft. The airline also operated some Boeing 737.

== Conclusion ==
After the deregulation of the airline industry in the United States in 1978, many new air carriers took to the skies while existing airlines grew, leading to an expansion from 297 million passengers handled in the U.S. in 1980 to 466 million in 1990. But along the way many new startup airlines operating jet aircraft in scheduled passenger service either failed or were acquired and then merged into other air carriers after encountering financial challenges including Air21, Air Atlanta, Air Florida, Eastwind Airlines, Jet America, Kiwi International Air Lines, MarkAir, Midway Airlines, Midwest Airlines, Muse Air, New York Air, Northeastern International Airways, People Express, Pride Air, Reno Air and Sunworld International Airways.

Best Airlines had no identifiable hub or traffic flow, and it only operated for a few years. But it is an example of the many new airlines that took to the skies in the years after the federal Airline Deregulation Act of 1978.

== See also ==
- List of defunct airlines of the United States
