= Esler Airfield =

Airport in Rapides Parish, Louisiana

Esler Field Esler Regional Airport Esler Army Airfield
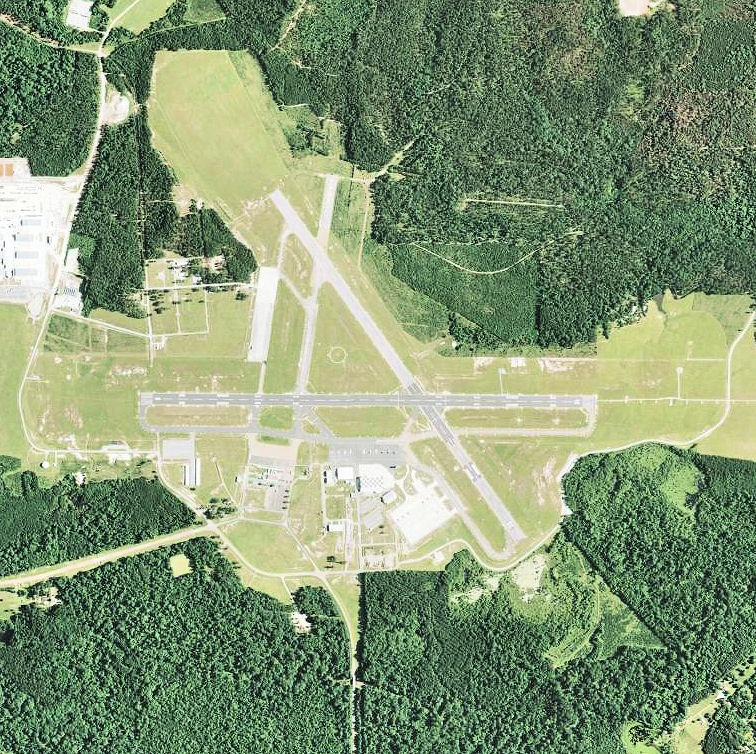
- USGS aerial image, 2004
- IATA: ESF; ICAO: KESF; FAA LID: ESF

Summary
- Airport type: Public / military
- Owner/Operator: Louisiana National Guard
- Serves: Central Louisiana
- Location: Rapides Parish, near Pineville, Louisiana
- Elevation AMSL: 112 ft (34 m)
- Coordinates: 31°23′42″N 92°17′45″W

Map
- Location of airport in Louisiana ESF (the United States)

Runways
Direction	Length		Surface
Direction	ft	m	Surface
9/27	5,999	1,828	Asphalt
14/32	5,601	1,707	Asphalt

Statistics (2019)
- Aircraft operations (year ending 1/17/2019): 12,725
- Based aircraft: 30
- Source: Federal Aviation Administration

Esler Field, also known as Esler Regional Airport (IATA: ESF, ICAO: KESF, FAA LID: ESF), is a military and public use airfield in Rapides Parish, Louisiana, United States, near the City of Pineville. It is located 10 nautical miles (12 statute miles, 19 kilometres) northeast of the central business district of Alexandria, Louisiana, The airfield is owned by the Louisiana Army National Guard and is the home of Army Aviation Support Facility #2 (AASF#2).

This airport is included in the FAA's National Plan of Integrated Airport Systems for 2011–2015, which categorized it as a general aviation airport. It has no scheduled commercial airline service at present but was served by Delta Air Lines in the past with mainline passenger jet service.

== History ==
=== World War II ===
After World War I in 1919, the Army had abandoned Camp Beauregard and turned the property over to the state of Louisiana, which returned it to the United States; however, interest in the military utilization of Camp Beauregard increased significantly in 1939 when war began in Europe. The United States needed a training ground for American troops. In 1940 the land was returned to the War Department for use as a World War II training area. That area included the now-abandoned Camps Claiborne and Livingston and what has become Esler Regional Airport.

Construction of the airport, originally called Camp Beauregard Army Field, for the United States Army Air Corps began in 1940. In the summer of 1940 and throughout 1941 the area was used for the Louisiana Maneuvers. The Air Corps used the airfield extensively during the maneuvers, with the 67th Observation Group stationing the 107th Observation Squadron at the airfield between 28 October 1940 and 14 December 1941. In addition, the 109th Observation Squadron used the airport from 27 February 1941 until 18 December 1942 flying light observation planes.

The airfield was renamed Esler Army Airfield in 1941 to honor Lt. Wilmer Esler, a pilot who became the first casualty of the airfield when his plane crashed on April 11, 1941. Esler AAF was assigned to Third Air Force, III Air Support Command. The 333d Air Base Group was the host unit at the airfield, being activated on 1 February 1942.

The first unit assigned for training at Esler was the 12th Bombardment Group, arriving for B-25 Mitchell training on 21 February 1942. The unit remained at Esler until July until being deployed to the Middle East and being assigned to Ninth Air Force.

In December 1942, the mission was changed to training Reconnaissance units, and Esler was reassigned directly to Third Air Force. The 347th Army Air Force Base Unit became the host unit at the station. Reconnaissance groups receiving training at the airfield were:

- 74th Reconnaissance Group, 13–28 December 1942
- 71st Reconnaissance Group, 24 January-31 March 1943
- 69th Reconnaissance Group, March–December 1943
- 77th Reconnaissance Group, 13 September-14 November 1943

In late 1943, Esler was again reassigned within Third Air Force, to the I Tactical Air Division, to become a close air support training field. The Division moved its headquarters to the field in April 1944. The P-40 Warhawk-equipped 372d Fighter Group trained at Esler in March and April 1944.

With the departure of the 372d, the 353d Army Air Force Base Unit took over training for replacement pilots, and unit training ended. On 20 April 1945, the 353d BU was redesignated as the 353d AAF BU (Maneuver Station), and Esler supported various training maneuvers at Fort Polk, providing simulated tactical air support to Army units.

On 1 August 1945, the airfield was again reassigned directly to Third Air Force. With the end of the war, inactivation of Esler Field began on 7 September 1945. However, the Air Force's inactivation was quite slow, with the airfield being put on standby status 31 January 1946. The 353d was redesignated as a Standby Unit, but not inactivated, keeping a skeleton force of 6 officers and 50 civilians assigned to the base until 31 May 1946 when the base was finally closed. The airfield remained Federal property until the 1950s when it was finally ceded to the Police Jury as surplus property. A small civilian airport opened after return to civil control.

=== Historical airline service ===
In the 1970s, the airport had scheduled passenger airline service provided by several air carriers including Delta Air Lines which operated mainline jet aircraft from Esler. According to the February 1, 1976 edition of the Official Airline Guide (OAG), Delta was operating eight flights a day from the airport at this time with Boeing 727-200 and McDonnell Douglas DC-9-30 mainline jetliners. Destinations served on a nonstop or direct, no change of plane basis by Delta included Atlanta (ATL), Dallas/Fort Worth (DFW), New Orleans (MSY), Washington, D.C. (DCA), Baton Rouge (BTR) and Shreveport (SHV). According to various Delta timetables from the 1970s, the airline also flew direct, no change of plane jet service at different times over the years from Esler to New York City (Kennedy (JFK) and Newark (EWR) airports), Philadelphia (PHL), Baltimore (BWI), Tampa (TPA), Fort Lauderdale (FLL), Charlotte (CLT), Denver (DEN), Las Vegas (LAS) and Reno, NV (RNO). Texas International Airlines (formerly known as Trans-Texas Airways, TTa) also served the airport at this time with Convair 600 turboprop aircraft with flights to Houston (IAH), Jackson, MS (JAN), Beaumont/Port Arthur, TX, (BPT) and Monroe, LA (MLU).

In 1984, Best Airlines was serving Esler with nonstop Douglas DC-9-10 jet service to Atlanta, GA (ATL), Dallas/Fort Worth, TX (DFW) and Gulfport, MS (GPT). Also during the 1980s, the airport was served by Royale Airlines, a regional airline that was based in Shreveport, Louisiana, with flights operated with twin turboprop aircraft including the Grumman Gulfstream I (G-159) which was a regional airliner version of Grumman's successful propjet business aircraft. Royale also operated Douglas DC-9-10 jets from the airport and in 1988 was flying nonstop DC-9 service to New Orleans (MSY). Royale operated nonstop turboprop service to Houston, Texas (serving IAH on behalf of Continental Airlines operating as the Continental Connection) and during the mid 1980s also flew regional and commuter turboprop aircraft as an independent air carrier nonstop to Baton Rouge (BTR), Lafayette (LFT), Lake Charles (LCH), Monroe (MLU), New Orleans (MSY) and Shreveport (SHV) in Louisiana as well as to Jackson, Mississippi (JAN) with direct one stop service being operated to Memphis, Tennessee (MEM). Also during the mid 1980s, Chaparral Airlines was operating stretched Grumman Gulfstream I-C (G-159C) propjets on American Eagle (airline) code sharing service on behalf of American Airlines nonstop from Dallas/Fort Worth (DFW).

=== A new role for Esler ===
In 1996, Esler Regional Airport became lifeless and quiet with an uncertain future after airport services including all scheduled passenger airline flights for central Louisiana were moved to the England Industrial Airpark and Community, the location of the former England Air Force Base which is now known as Alexandria International Airport (AEX). But the abandoned Esler presented the Louisiana National Guard with a golden opportunity to expand the area available to conduct its training. On June 1, 2001, the Rapides Parish Police Jury transferred the airport's management to the Louisiana Army National Guard in a 99-year lease. Today, Esler is the site of numerous training exercises.

About 60 percent of the airport's operations are military and the rest are civilian. Although Esler doesn't offer private jet passenger services it does provide both military and civilian aircraft fuel services through its civilian contractor Million Air Interlink Inc.

While Alexandria International Airport is central Louisiana's primary airport and the leader of aviation services in the area, Esler is the area's secondary airport. The airport's runways can handle the heavy weight of most airline traffic, such as 137-passenger-capacity Boeing 737s, 224-passenger-capacity Boeing 757s and the C-17 Globemasters that are the primary cargo plane of the Air Force and weigh 169,000 pounds each.

== Facilities and aircraft ==
The airport covers an area of 2,161 acres (875 ha) at an elevation of 112 feet (34 m) above mean sea level. It has two asphalt paved runways: 9/27 is 5,999 by 150 feet (1,828 x 46 m) and 14/32 is 5,601 by 150 feet (1,707 x 46 m).

For the 12-month period ending January 17, 2019, the airport had 12,725 aircraft operations, an average of 35 per day: 53% general aviation and 47% military. At that time there were 30 aircraft based at this airport: 13 single-engine, 1 jet and 16 military.

== See also ==
- Louisiana World War II Army Airfields
- List of airports in Louisiana
