= Louisiana World War II Army Airfields =

Louisiana World War II Army Airfields
- Part of World War II

Site information
- Type: Army Airfields

Location
- Map Of Louisiana World War II Army Airfields

Site history
- Built: 1940-1944
- In use: 1940-present

During World War II, the United States Army Air Forces (USAAF) established numerous air facilities in Louisiana for antisubmarine defense in the Gulf of Mexico and for training pilots and aircrews of USAAF fighters and bombers. The larger facilities were Army Air Bases (AAB) while the Army Air Fields ( AAFld) were lesser facilities. The map below shows both types as AAB and AAF.

Most of these air facilities were under the command of Third Air Force or the Army Air Forces Training Command (AAFTC). In addition, the Air Technical Service Command (ATSC) ran a significant number of airfields in a support role.

It is still possible to find remnants of these wartime airfields. Many were converted into municipal airports, some were returned to agriculture and several were retained as United States Air Force installations and were front-line bases during the Cold War. Hundreds of the temporary buildings that were used survive today, and are being used for other purposes.

== Major airfields ==
Air Technical Service Command

- Moisant Army Airfield, Kenner

Sub-base of Naval Air Station New Orleans, Joint Use
Now: Louis Armstrong New Orleans International Airport

- Harding Field, Baton Rouge

49th Base Headquarters and Air Base Squadron
Now: Baton Rouge Metropolitan Airport

- New Orleans Army Air Base, New Orleans

37th Base Headquarters and Air Base Squadron
Now: New Orleans Lakefront Airport

Third Air Force

- Alexandria Army Air Field, Alexandria

517th Base Headquarters and Air Base Squadron
Later: England Air Force Base (1950-1992)
Now: Alexandria International Airport

- Esler Field, Pineville

333d Air Base Group
Now: Esler Regional Airport

- Lake Charles Army Air Field, Lake Charles

Gulf Coast Training Center, 1942
82d Base Headquarters and Air Base Squadron
Later: Lake Charles/Chennault Air Force Base (1950-1963)
Now: Chennault International Airport

- DeRidder Army Air Base, DeRidder

317th Base Headquarters and Air Base Squadron
Now: Beauregard Regional Airport

Army Air Forces Training Command
AAF Southeast Training Center

- Barksdale Field, Shreveport

5th Base Headquarters and Air Base Squadron
Flying Training, HQ AAF Training Command
Now: Barksdale Air Force Base

- Selman Field, Monroe

329th Base Headquarters and Air Base Squadron
Now: Monroe Regional Airport
