= Abraham Shushan =

American politician

Abraham Lazard Shushan Sr. (January 12, 1894 – November 3, 1966) was an American politician in the middle of the 20th century. A friend and political associate of U.S. Senator Huey P. Long, Shushan was an important political figure in Louisiana during the 1920s and 1930s, before scandals drove him from public office.

== Early life and career ==
Shushan was born in Bougere (now part of Reserve), Louisiana. He was first employed during his early teens by Shushan Brothers, a New Orleans wholesale dry goods business established by his father and uncle. Shushan became a partner in the firm in 1916 and president of the firm in 1931.

== Political career ==
Shushan became involved in Louisiana politics as a supporter in the political machine of Huey Long. Long was criticized by Gerald L. K. Smith, a racist and antisemitic politician, of having "too many Jews" in circle, which "Shushan resented." After Long was assassinated, Shushan and his allies had Smith fired and his Share Our Wealth program eliminated.

Appointed to the New Orleans Levee Board in 1920 by Governor John M. Parker, he was reappointed by successive administrations and became president of the Board in 1929. He was a member of the Levee Board during the Great Mississippi Flood of 1927.

Shushan was involved in fundraising for John H. Overton during the Election of 1932, which led later to legal trouble for him. The defeated incumbent, Edwin S. Broussard, accused Overton, and Shushan and his other supporters of voter fraud; the United States Senate held hearings, but Overton was seated without opposition.

It was under his direction that the lakefront sea wall and the New Orleans Lakefront Airport were constructed. Originally, in 1934, that airport was named in his honor. In 1935, he was tried for Federal tax and money laundering charges under the Internal Revenue Code by a special prosecutor, former Texas Governor Dan Moody, but was found not guilty. However, due to the scandal, his name was literally and figuratively removed from the airport, in a move similar to a Damnatio memoriae. His role in the Long machine ended due to the tax evasion scandal, despite his acquittal. The scandal was cited by scholar Zephyr Teachout as one of the most notorious corruption scandals in American history.

He ended up being sued by Louisiana Attorney General on behalf of the Levee Board, and the case reached the Louisiana Supreme Court in 1940. In 1941, the United States Court of Appeals for the Fifth Circuit upheld Shushan's conviction for wire fraud.

== Death and legacy ==
Shushan died in New Orleans on November 3, 1966, in a plane crash.
