= Pride Air =

United States airline operating in 1985

IATA	ICAO	Call sign
NI	-	-
- Commenced operations: August 1, 1985; 40 years ago
- Ceased operations: November 15, 1985; 40 years ago
- Operating bases: Louis Armstrong New Orleans International Airport
- Headquarters: New Orleans, Louisiana, United States
- Key people: Paul Eckel (Chairman and Chief Executive Officer) Fred Gardner

Pride Air was a United States airline that operated for three months during 1985. Pride Air was based out of New Orleans International Airport (MSY).

== History ==
Undated newspaper advertisement for Pride Air

Pride Air was founded by Paul Eckel, a former chief pilot for Continental Airlines. Eckel, who served as the company's chairman and chief executive, had hoped to create an employee-owned low-cost airline operating out of New Orleans. Eckel had previously led an unsuccessful attempt by employees to acquire Continental Airlines during its first bankruptcy. Many of Pride's first investors were former Continental employees, who raised $15.5 million to start the airline. They chose New Orleans (MSY) as a hub because there was no one dominant airline operating from the airport at that time. Pride Air management had previously considered Kansas City as possible hub but then reconsidered when Eastern Airlines began building up their service at Kansas City.

Operations began on August 1, 1985. Pride's business plan centered on a hub-and-spoke operation in New Orleans which would link cities in California and Florida, with Denver, Las Vegas and Salt Lake City also being served. A similar plan by Northeastern International Airways had tried this approach in New Orleans in 1984. Pride Air did not initially offer service as a low-cost carrier and was instead structured more as a full service airline. However, due to increased competition from Continental Airlines in the New Orleans market in tandem with cash flow problems, Pride Air suspended operations on November 15, 1985, only three months after it began flying. It later filed for chapter 11 bankruptcy the following December.

== See also ==
- List of defunct airlines of the United States
