= Lakefront Airport =

Public airport in New Orleans, Louisiana, USA

Lakefront Airport (former New Orleans Army Air Base)
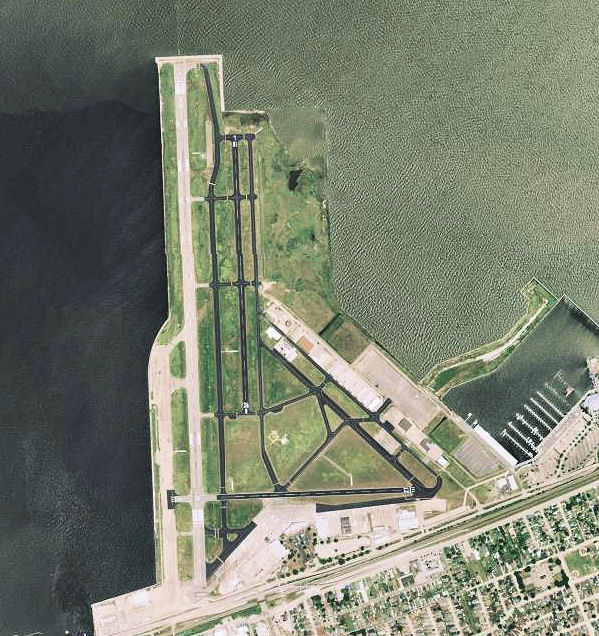
- USGS 2006 orthophoto

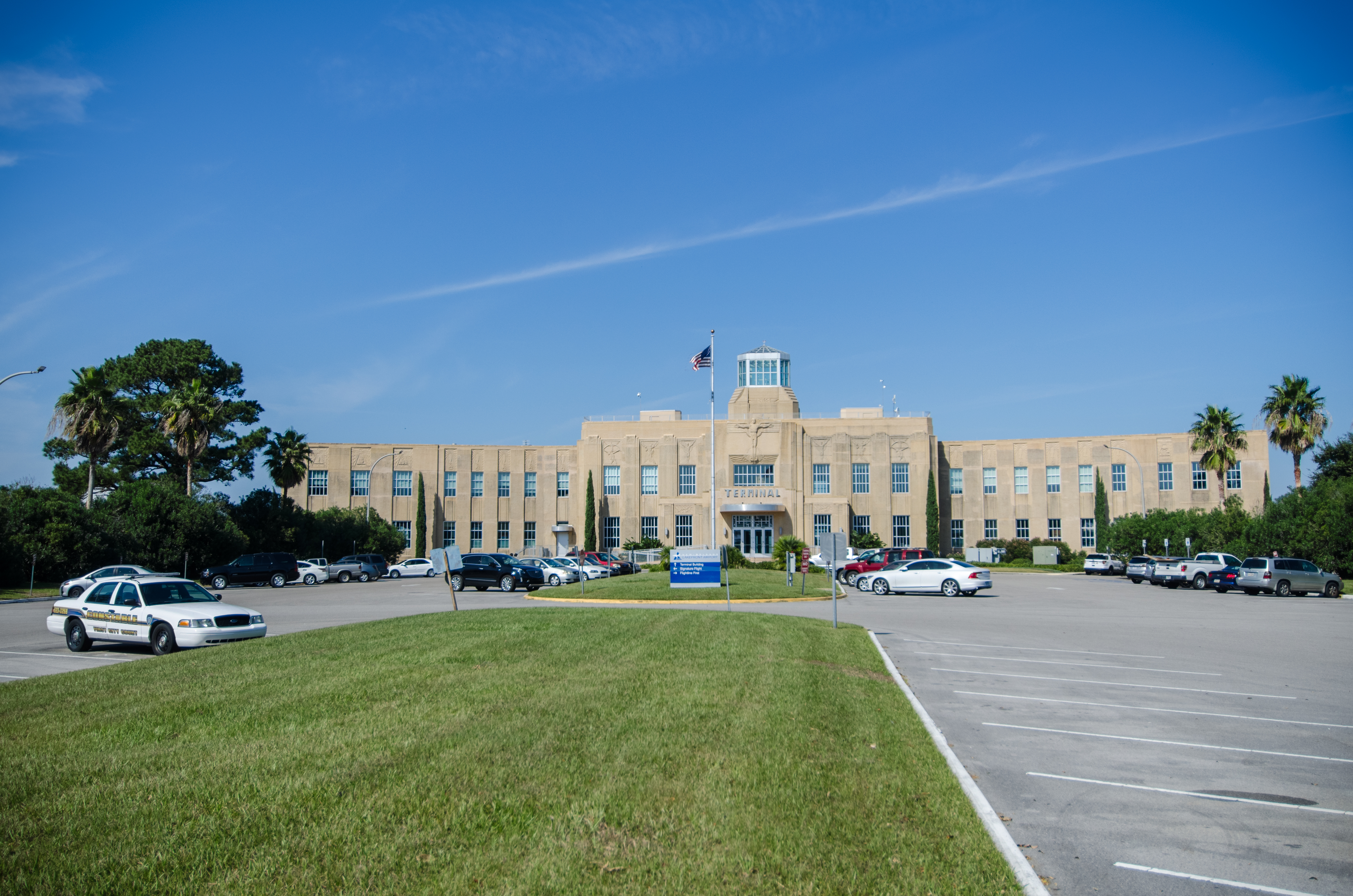
- Lakefront Airport, Main Terminal
- IATA: NEW; ICAO: KNEW; FAA LID: NEW

Summary
- Airport type: Public
- Owner: Orleans Levee District
- Operator: Lakefront Management Authority
- Serves: New Orleans, Louisiana
- Elevation AMSL: 7 ft / 2 m
- Coordinates: 30°02′33″N 090°01′42″W
- Website: lakefrontairport.com

Map

Runways
Direction	Length		Surface
Direction	ft	m	Surface
9/27	3,114	949	Asphalt
18L/36R	3,697	1,127	Asphalt
18R/36L	6,879	2,097	Asphalt

Statistics (2016)
- Aircraft operations: 60,778
- Based aircraft: 125
- Source: Federal Aviation Administration

Lakefront Airport (IATA: NEW, ICAO: KNEW, FAA LID: NEW) is a public airport five miles (eight kilometers) northeast of downtown New Orleans, in Orleans Parish, Louisiana, United States. The National Plan of Integrated Airport Systems for 2011–2015 categorized it as a general aviation reliever airport.

Originally the airline airport for the New Orleans area, Lakefront Airport relinquished that role in the summer of 1946 when airline service began from Moisant International Airport (now Louis Armstrong New Orleans International Airport), a larger facility in the nearby suburb of Kenner. Lakefront Airport continues as a general aviation airport with charter, private, and occasional military operations. Airline service is also available to destinations in the Gulf South Region.

The terminal building's interior retains much of its original lavish 1930s decoration, and the Art Deco exterior, obscured for decades by a "bomb-proof" facade installed after World War II, has been returned to its original appearance. The terminal building houses a restaurant frequented by nearby residents, the Walnut Room. The sculpture in front of the terminal, Fountain of the Four Winds by Enrique Alferez, is a local landmark.

Lakefront Airport was damaged by hurricane-force winds and the storm surge of Hurricane Katrina in 2005, and a number of the hangars and outlying buildings were destroyed. While the airport soon resumed functioning, restoration of the terminal building and other facilities proceeded slowly. With the exterior of the main terminal fully restored, however, the classic Art Deco building was used as the headquarters of the fictional company Ferris Aircraft in the 2011 action hero film Green Lantern starring Ryan Reynolds and Blake Lively.

Since 2014, Lakefront Airport has hosted the WWII Air, Sea & Land Festival. The three-day airshow hosted by the National WWII Museum, Commemorative Air Force, and the Greater New Orleans Sports Foundation honor the men and women of WWII through aviation displays, vehicle displays, and re-enactments.

== History ==
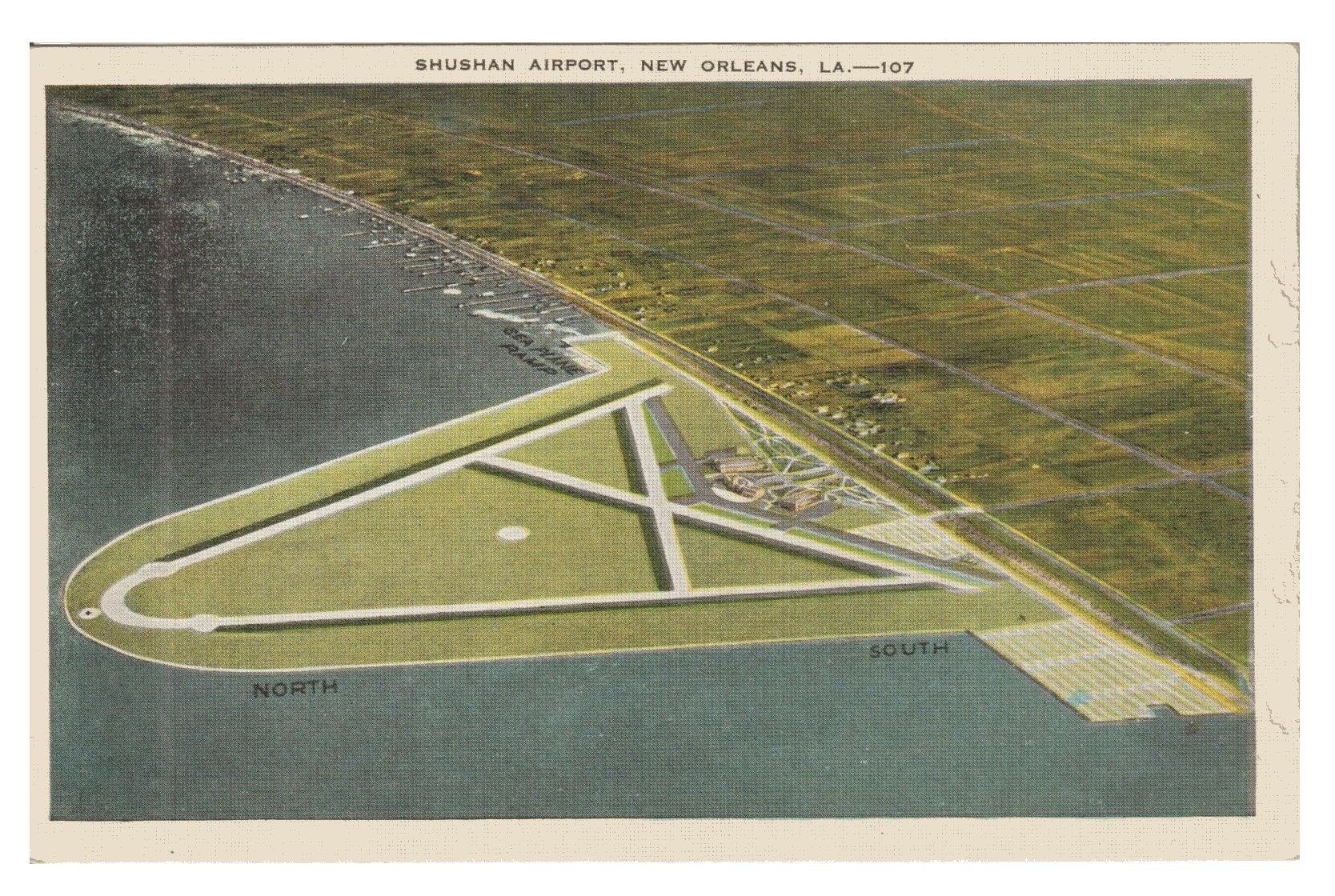
Depiction of Shushan Airport on a postcard, 1930s

Airport construction began in 1929 by orders of Huey Long, on a man-made peninsula dredged by the Orleans Levee Board, jutting into Lake Pontchartrain on the Eastern New Orleans side of the Industrial Canal. It was designed by New Orleans architect Leon C. Weiss and his firm Weiss, Dreyfous, and Seiferth, which also designed the Louisiana State Capitol. It was originally named Shushan Airport after Levee Board president and Long ally Abraham Shushan. The airport opened on 10 February 1934. Visitors noticed that every doorknob, windowsill, countertop, and plumbing fixture bore the name or the initials of Abe Shushan. After Shushan's name was tarnished from involvement in the Louisiana Scandals of the late 1930s, the airport was renamed New Orleans Airport in 1939.

The assigned airport code "NEW" is retained despite its current "Lakefront Airport" name.

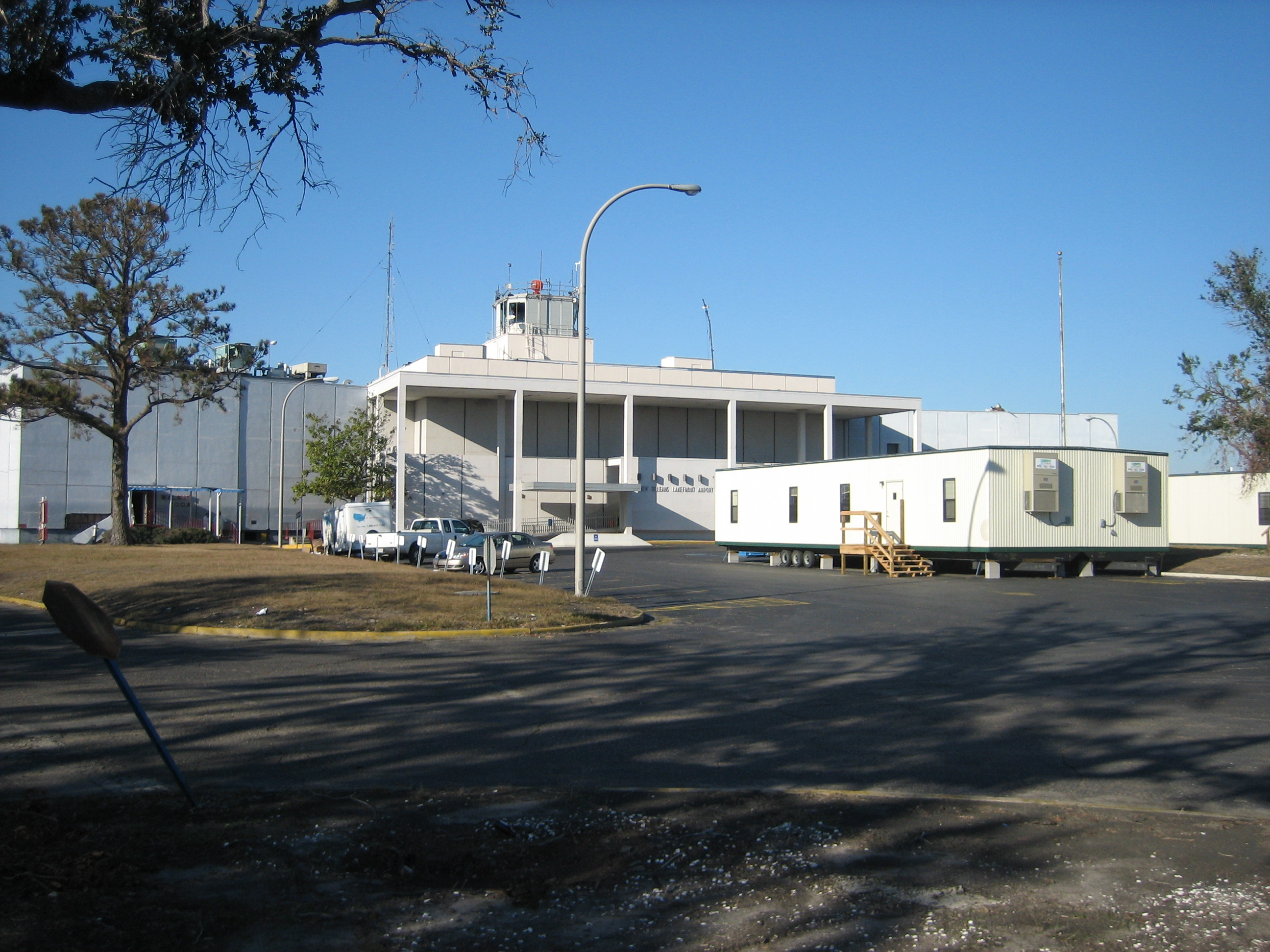
Terminal in late 2005, before restoration

During World War II the airfield was used by the United States Army Air Forces and housed the Tropical Weather School in 1945.

At the start of the 1960s, thick concrete panels were added to the main terminal building to turn it into a Cold War-era bomb shelter.

Ammunition manufacturer Joyce Hornady was killed in a Piper Aztec on January 15, 1981. The aircraft, with Hornady at the controls flying in heavy fog, crashed into Lake Pontchartrain while on final approach to Lakefront Airport.

Lakefront Airport was badly damaged by storm surge during Hurricane Katrina in 2005, and again during Hurricane Isaac in 2012. The airport was quickly brought back to service, but many facilities remained in temporary trailers for years after Katrina.

On January 23, 2010, a United States Navy Beechcraft T-34 Mentor trainer crashed into Lake Pontchartrain just over a mile from the approach end of the airport. The aircraft was intending to land at Naval Air Station Joint Reserve Base New Orleans but diverted to Lakefront Airport due to weather. The student pilot on board survived, but the instructor drowned. According to official reports, the aircrew lost track of their altitude which resulted in their ditching in the lake.

Post-Katrina reconstruction at the airport has included the restoration of the main terminal building's original Art Deco facade. The Art Deco interior and restoration of the Shushan terminal were filmed for a television documentary titled Return Flight. Filming began in 2012 and was scheduled to conclude in 2013 when the restoration drew to a close.

== Facilities ==
Lakefront Airport covers 473 acres (191 ha) at an elevation of 7 feet (2 m). It has three asphalt runways:

- 18R/36L is 6,879 by 150 feet (2,097 x 46 m).
- 18L/36R is 3,697 by 75 feet (1,127 x 23 m).
- 9/27 is 3,114 by 75 feet (949 x 23 m).

In the year ending December 31, 2022 the airport had 78,080 aircraft operations, average 214 per day: 88% general aviation, 3% military, and 9% air taxi. 125 aircraft were then based at this airport: 62% single-engine, 18% multi-engine, 15% jet and 6% helicopter.

== In popular culture ==
- Used as a location in the 1973 James Bond film Live and Let Die
- Filming location of the Green Lantern, starring Ryan Reynolds and Blake Lively
- Filming location for the film Reminiscence, starring Hugh Jackman
- Filming location for the Netflix film Project Power, starring Jamie Foxx
- Filming location for the Netflix film Tall Girl
- Filming location for Capone, starring Tom Hardy
- Filming location for Ray
- Filming location for Daisy Jones & The Six
- Filming location for Leverage: Redemption
- Filming location for Cloak & Dagger

== See also ==
- Louisiana World War II Army Airfields
- List of airports in Louisiana
