= Louis Armstrong New Orleans International Airport =

Airport serving New Orleans, Louisiana, United States

Louis Armstrong New Orleans International Airport Moisant Field

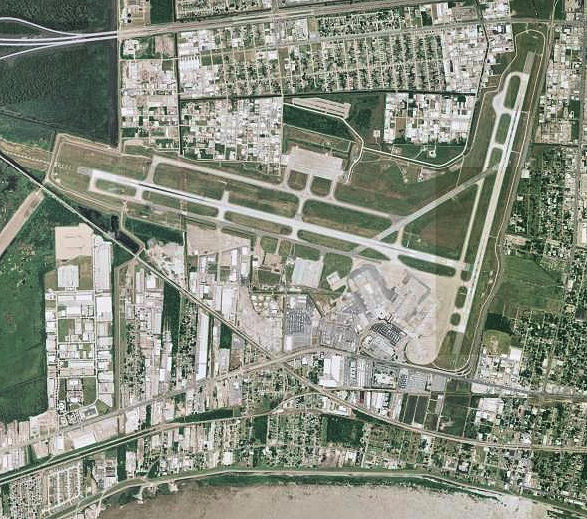
- A 2006 orthophoto, prior to the construction of the current terminal
- IATA: MSY; ICAO: KMSY; FAA LID: MSY; WMO: 72231

Summary
- Airport type: Public
- Owner/Operator: New Orleans Aviation Board
- Serves: New Orleans metropolitan area
- Location: Kenner, Louisiana, U.S.
- Operating base for: Breeze Airways
- Built: May 1946; 80 years ago
- Elevation AMSL: 4 ft (1.2 m)
- Coordinates: 29°59′36″N 090°15′29″W
- Website: flymsy.com

Maps
- FAA airport diagram
- Interactive map of Louis Armstrong New Orleans International Airport; Moisant Field

Runways
Direction	Length		Surface
Direction	ft	m	Surface
11/29	10,104	3,080	Concrete
02/20	7,001	2,134	Concrete

Helipads
Number	Length		Surface
Number	ft	m	Surface
H1	50	15	Asphalt
H2	50	15	Concrete

Statistics (2025)
- Aircraft operations: 110,433
- Total passengers: 12,434,800 ▼5.2%
- Source: MSYFAA

Louis Armstrong New Orleans International Airport (IATA: MSY, ICAO: KMSY, FAA LID: MSY) is an international airport under Class B airspace in the City of Kenner, Jefferson Parish, Louisiana, United States. It is owned by the City of New Orleans and is 11 miles (18 km) west of downtown New Orleans.

Armstrong International is the primary commercial airport for the New Orleans metropolitan area and southeast Louisiana. Nonstop service to some sixty destinations is provided, including flights to Europe, Canada, Latin America and the Caribbean.

MSY covers 1,500 acres (607 ha) of land and contains two runways and two helipads. At an average of 4.5 feet (1.4 m) above sea level, MSY is the third lowest-lying international airport in the world, behind only Amsterdam Airport Schiphol in the Netherlands, which is 11 feet (3.4 m) below sea level, and Atyrau International Airport in Kazakhstan, which lies 72 feet (22 m) below sea level.

== History ==
=== Beginnings ===
In the early 20th century, the location hosted agricultural fields. On Dec. 31, 1910, daredevil aviator John Moisant, died in an airplane accident when he was thrown from his plane. The area was shortly after converted to a stockyard and was named Moisant Stock Yards after him. The airport's IATA code, MSY, is derived from this name.

Plans for a new airport began in 1940, as evidence mounted that the older New Orleans Lakefront Airport was too small. It was originally named Moisant Field.

In World War II the land became a government air base. It returned to civil control after the war and commercial service commenced in May 1946. When commercial service began at Moisant Field in 1946, the terminal occupied a large, makeshift hangar-like building. In September 1947, the airport was shut down as it was submerged under two feet of water in the wake of the 1947 Fort Lauderdale Hurricane's impact.

=== 1959 terminal ===
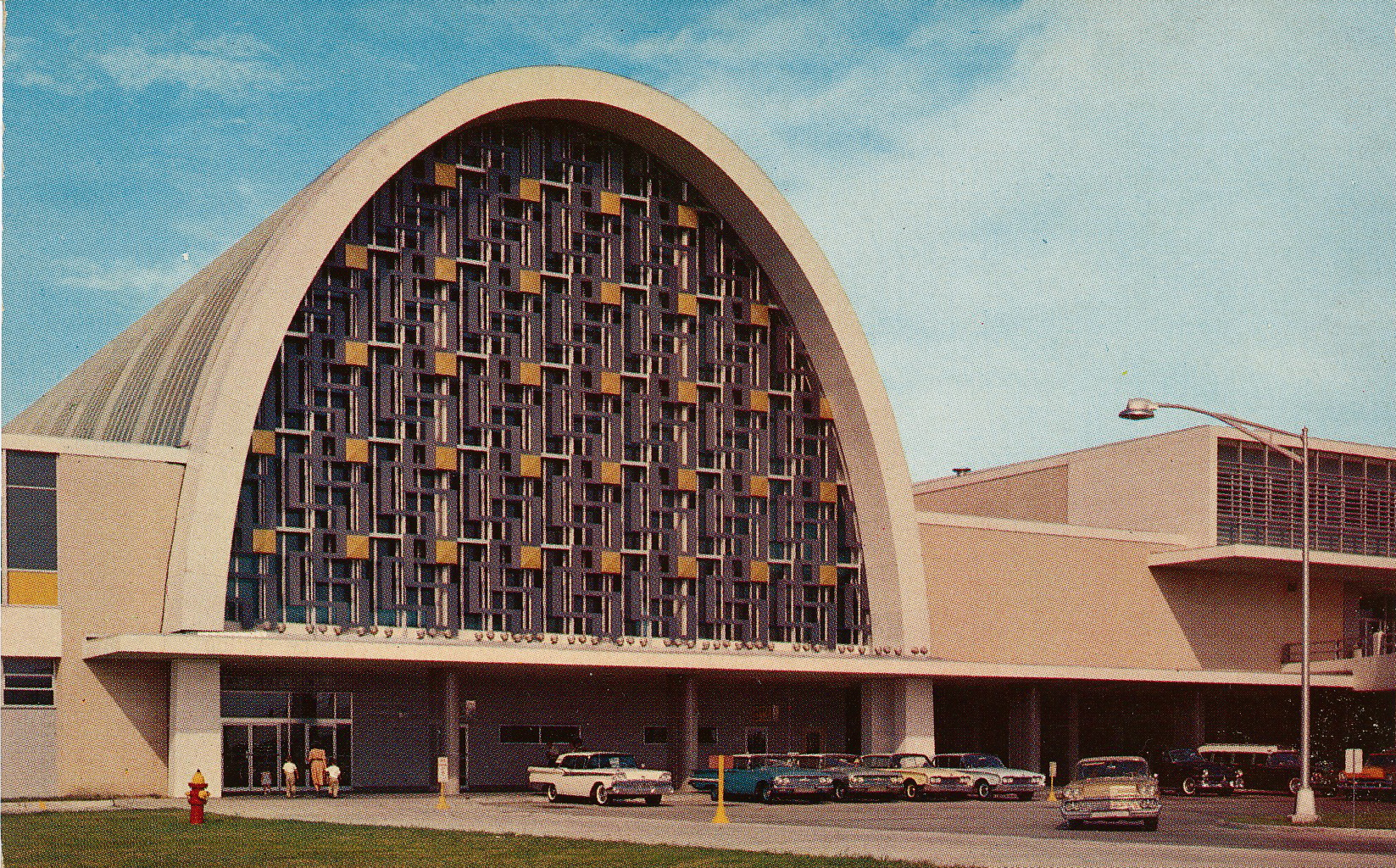
The former airline terminal in the 1960s

A new terminal complex debuted in 1959 towards the end of Mayor DeLesseps "Chep" Morrison's administration. This structure, greatly expanded in the 1970s and the recipient of two rebuilt concourses in the 1990s and 2000s, comprised the passenger terminal until its replacement in November 2019. The former terminal contained two sections, East and West, connected by a central ticketing alley and baggage claim.

Four concourses, A, B, C and D, were attached to the terminal, which eventually grew to 47 gates. The vaulted arrivals lounge at the head of Concourse C and the adjacent, western half of the ticketing alley are the remaining portions of the airport's 1959 terminal complex.

Retired United States Air Force Major General Junius Wallace Jones served as airport director in the 1950s. During his term, a period of rapid change in civil aviation, the airport received many improvements. By the time the airport's 1959 terminal building opened, the name Moisant International Airport was being used for the New Orleans facility. In 1961, the name was changed to New Orleans International Airport.

The airport's mid-1970s expansion included a lengthened main terminal ticketing area, an airport access road linking the terminal to Interstate 10, and the construction of Concourses A and B. The two original 1959 concourses were renamed Concourse C and Concourse D, with the latter receiving a four-gate addition at its terminus, designed to accommodate widebody aircraft.

In July 1978, National Airlines began flights to Amsterdam with continuing same-plane service to Frankfurt utilizing widebody McDonnell Douglas DC-10s. This was New Orleans' first nonstop transatlantic flight. Less than a month later, National added a stop in Tampa due to low demand. In May 1981, British Airways inaugurated a flight from London's Gatwick Airport to Mexico City that stopped in New Orleans. It flew a Lockheed L-1011 TriStar on the route. The airline, then government-owned, discontinued the service in October 1982 because of its deepening financial problems.

Northeastern International Airways operated a small hub at MSY in the spring of 1984. Another airline that attempted to operate a hub at MSY was short-lived Pride Air which was based in New Orleans and was operating nonstop or direct Boeing 727 service from the airport to sixteen destinations, including cities in California, Florida, and the western U.S., in the summer of 1985.

In July 2001, to honor the 100th anniversary of Louis Armstrong's birth (August 4, 1901), the airport's name became Louis Armstrong New Orleans International Airport.

=== Post-Katrina recovery ===
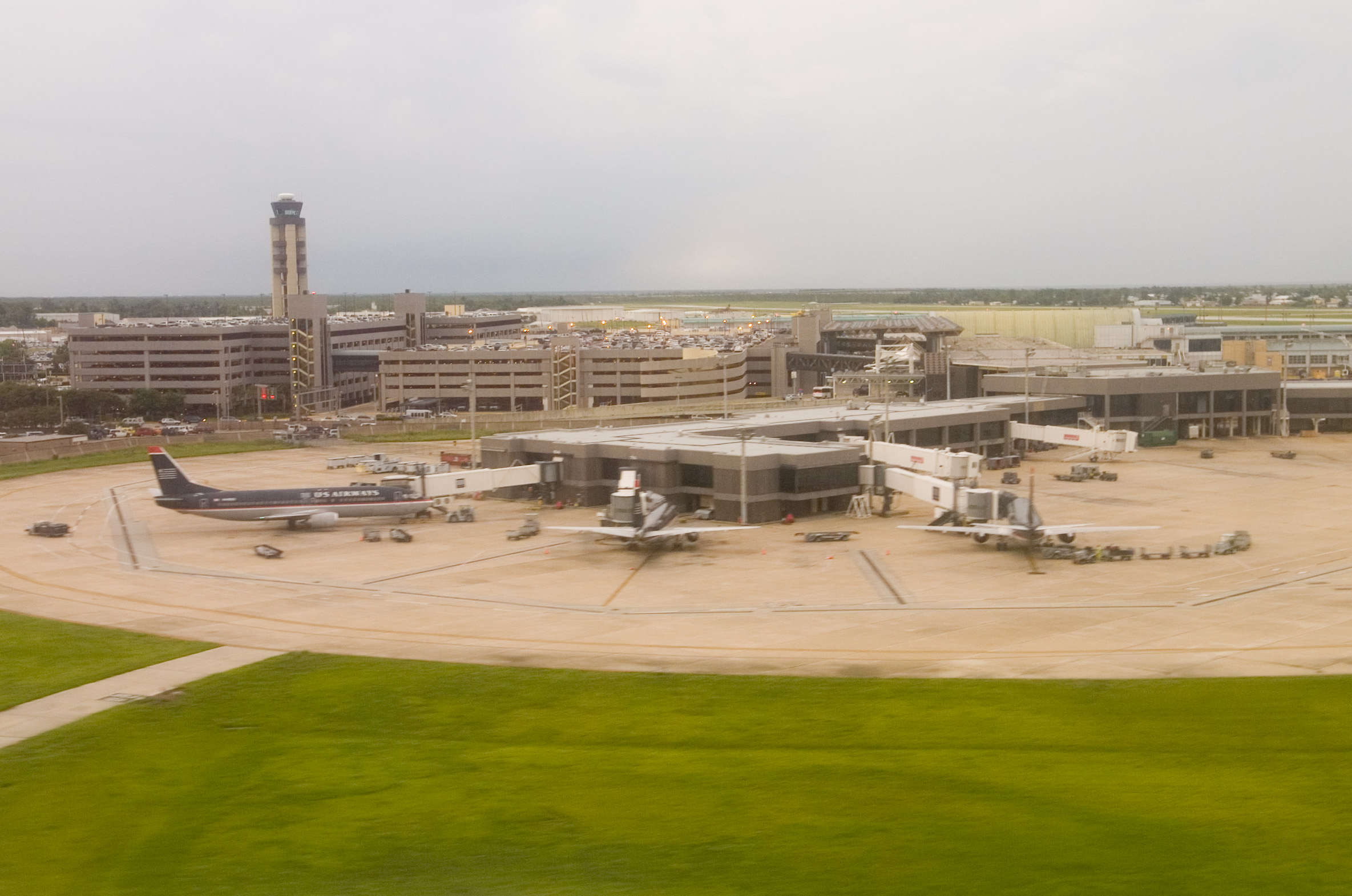
Armstrong Airport, June 2007

MSY reopened to commercial flights on September 13, 2005, after the devastation of Hurricane Katrina the previous month, with four flights operated by Delta Air Lines to Atlanta and a Northwest Airlines flight to Memphis. Slowly, service from other carriers began to resume. All international service into MSY remained suspended while the FIS facility was closed post-Katrina. This facility was reopened in time to accommodate chartered flights arriving from London, Manchester, Bournemouth, and Nottingham (UK) carrying tourists arriving for the 2006 Mardi Gras and set to depart from the Port of New Orleans aboard a cruise liner.

MSY served 9,785,394 passengers in 2014, exceeding for the first time in the post-Katrina era the total passenger count of 9,733,179 achieved in 2004, the last full calendar year prior to Katrina's landfall in August 2005. A new record passenger count was set by the airport in 2015. 10,673,301 passengers were served, eclipsing the earlier record of 9.9 million passengers, set in 2000. In 2019 the airport served 13.1 million passengers.

=== New terminal ===
In December 2015, the New Orleans Aviation Board, along with New Orleans Mayor Mitch Landrieu and the City Council, approved a plan to build a new $598 million terminal building on the north side of the airport property with two concourses and 30 gates. Designed by Argentine-American architect Cesar Pelli, construction on the new main terminal began in January 2016. During the construction, the scope of the project was expanded so the terminal would feature 35 gates.

In March 2017, British Airways resumed flying to MSY, commencing nonstop service to London's Heathrow Airport using Boeing 787 widebody aircraft.

The new terminal opened in November 2019 at a cost of $1.3 billion. The former terminal, located on the south side of the airfield, is no longer in regular commercial use.

== Facilities ==
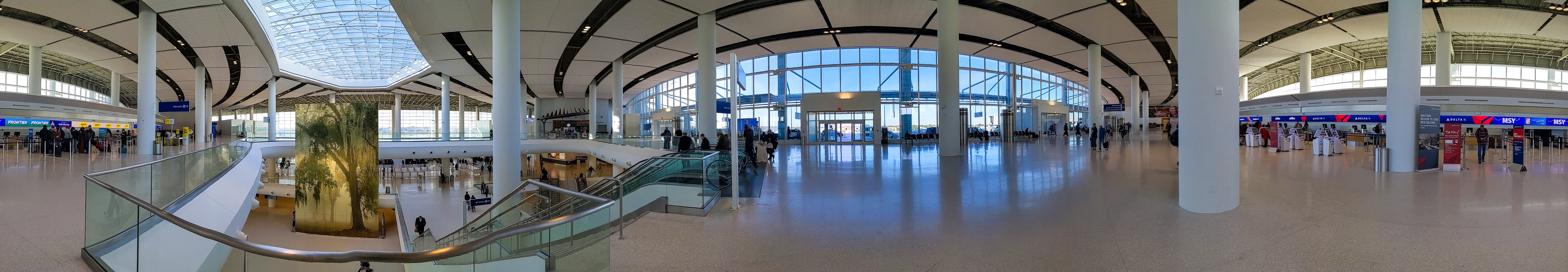
The terminal

MSY has a single operational terminal with three concourses labeled A, B, and C. There are 35 gates. Departures and Ticketing are on Level 3, TSA Security Screening is on Level 2, and Arrivals and Baggage Claim are on Level 1. International flights are processed in Concourse A, which contains the airport's customs facilities.

The terminal is served by Interstate 10. Bus service between the airport and downtown New Orleans is provided by New Orleans Regional Transit Authority Airport Express Route 202 and Jefferson Parish Transit route E-1. Airport Shuttle has services to most hotels and hostels in the Central Business District of New Orleans. The rental car facility is on the south side of the airfield next to the former terminal.

== Airlines and destinations ==
=== Passenger ===
Airlines	Destinations
Aeroméxico Connect	Mexico City–Benito Juárez (begins June 17, 2027)
Air Canada	Toronto–Pearson
Alaska Airlines	Seattle/Tacoma; Seasonal: Portland (OR)
Allegiant Air	Cincinnati
American Airlines	Charlotte, Chicago–O'Hare, Dallas/Fort Worth, Miami, New York–LaGuardia, Philadelphia, Phoenix–Sky Harbor, Washington–National
American Eagle	Chicago–O'Hare, Dallas/Fort Worth, Philadelphia, Washington–National; Seasonal: Miami
Avelo Airlines	Dallas/McKinney (begins December 17, 2026)
Breeze Airways	Charleston (SC), Fayetteville/Bentonville, Las Vegas, Los Angeles, Louisville, Myrtle Beach, Norfolk, Orlando, Raleigh/Durham, Richmond, Savannah, Tampa; Seasonal: Cancún, Fort Myers, Jacksonville (FL), Phoenix–Sky Harbor (begins February 1, 2027), Pittsburgh
British Airways	London–Heathrow
Delta Air Lines	Atlanta, Boston, Detroit, Los Angeles, Minneapolis/St. Paul, New York–JFK, New York–LaGuardia, Salt Lake City
Frontier Airlines	Atlanta, Dallas/Fort Worth, Denver, Orlando, Philadelphia
JetBlue	Boston, Fort Lauderdale, New York–JFK
Southwest Airlines	Atlanta, Austin, Baltimore, Cancún, Chicago–Midway, Dallas–Love, Denver, Fort Lauderdale, Houston–Hobby, Kansas City, Las Vegas, Los Angeles, Nashville, New York–LaGuardia, Orlando, Phoenix–Sky Harbor, San Antonio, San Diego, St. Louis, Tampa, Washington–National; Seasonal: Raleigh/Durham
Sun Country Airlines	Seasonal: Minneapolis/St. Paul
United Airlines	Chicago–O'Hare, Denver, Houston–Intercontinental, Newark, San Francisco, Washington–Dulles
United Express	Chicago–O'Hare; Seasonal: Houston–Intercontinental, Newark, Washington–Dulles

=== Cargo ===
Airlines	Destinations
Amazon Air	Cincinnati
DHL Aviation	Cincinnati, Houston–Intercontinental, Memphis
FedEx Express	Indianapolis, Memphis
UPS Airlines	Houston–Intercontinental, Louisville, Ontario

== Statistics ==
=== Annual traffic ===
Annual Passenger Traffic at MSY 2017-Present
Year	Passengers	% Change
2017	12,255,160	—
2018	13,397,302	▲9.3%
2019	13,991,590	▲4.4%
2020	5,358,305	▼61.7%
2021	8,167,830	▲52.4%
2022	12,076,496	▲47.9%
2023	12,804,551	▲6.0%
2024	13,177,660	▲2.9%
2025	12,510,195	▼5.1%

=== Top domestic destinations ===
Busiest domestic routes from MSY (June 2025 – May 2026)
Rank	City	Passengers	Carriers
1	Atlanta, Georgia	599,272	Delta, Frontier, Southwest, Spirit
2	Houston–Intercontinental, Texas	340,855	Spirit, United
3	Dallas/Fort Worth, Texas	339,008	American, Spirit
4	Orlando, Florida	292,530	Breeze, Frontier, Southwest, Spirit
5	Denver, Colorado	288,104	Frontier, Southwest, United
6	Dallas–Love, Texas	238,231	Southwest
7	Chicago–O'Hare, Illinois	231,295	American, Spirit, United
8	Charlotte, North Carolina	226,382	American, Spirit
9	Houston–Hobby, Texas	224,080	Southwest
10	Los Angeles, California	211,590	Breeze, Delta, Southwest, Spirit

Busiest international routes from MSY (June 2025 – May 2026)
Rank	City		Carriers
1	London, United Kingdom	41,405	British Airways
2	San Pedro Sula, Honduras	24,053	Spirit
3	Cancún, Mexico	22,622	Breeze, Southwest, Spirit
4	Toronto, Canada	14,342	Air Canada, Air Canada Rogue
5	Palmerola, Honduras	2,517	Spirit

=== Airline market share ===
Largest airlines at MSY (June 2025 – May 2026)
Rank	Airline	Passengers	Share
1	Southwest Airlines	4,042,392	33.2%
2	Delta Air Lines	2,106,633	17.3%
3	American Airlines	2,101,437	17.2%
4	United Airlines	1,684,152	13.8%
5	Spirit Airlines	949,070	7.8%
–	Other	1,301,183	10.7%

== Accidents and incidents ==
- On November 16, 1959 National Airlines Flight 967, a Douglas DC-7 flying from Tampa to New Orleans crashed into the Gulf of Mexico. All 42 passengers and crew were killed.
- On February 25, 1964, Eastern Air Lines Flight 304 operated with a Douglas DC-8 flying from New Orleans International Airport to Washington Dulles International Airport crashed nine minutes after takeoff. All 51 passengers and 7 crew members were killed.
- On March 30, 1967, Delta Air Lines Flight 9877, a Douglas DC-8-51, a training exercise with 6 crew members aboard, crashed on approach to MSY at 12:50 AM CST after simulating a two-engine out approach, resulting in a loss of control. All 6 crewmembers and 13 on the ground were killed. The DC-8 crashed into a residential area, destroying several homes and a motel complex.
- On March 20, 1969, Douglas DC-3 N142D, leased from Avion Airways for a private charter, crashed on landing, killing 16 of the 27 passengers and crew members on board. The aircraft was operating a domestic non-scheduled passenger flight from Memphis International Airport, Tennessee.
- On July 9, 1982, Pan Am Flight 759, en route from Miami to San Diego, departed New Orleans International on its way to a second stop-over at Las Vegas. The Boeing 727-200 jetliner took off from the east–west runway (Runway 10/28) traveling east but never gained an altitude higher than 150 feet (46 m). The aircraft traveled 4,610 feet (1405 m) beyond the end of Runway 10, hitting trees along the way, until crashing into a residential neighborhood. A total of 153 people were killed (all 145 on board and 8 on the ground). The crash was, at the time, the second-deadliest civil aviation disaster in U.S. history. The National Transportation Safety Board (NTSB) determined the probable cause was the aircraft's encounter with a microburst-induced wind shear during the liftoff. This atmospheric condition created a downdraft and decreasing headwind forcing the plane downward. Modern wind shear detection equipment protecting flights from such conditions is now in place both onboard planes and at most commercial airports, including Armstrong International.
- On May 24, 1988, TACA Flight 110 was forced to glide without power and make an emergency landing on top of a levee east of New Orleans International Airport after flame-out in both engines of the Boeing 737-300 in a severe thunderstorm. There were no casualties and the aircraft was subsequently repaired and returned to service.
- On April 4, 2011, United Airlines Flight 497 en route from New Orleans to San Francisco made an emergency landing back at New Orleans after the flight crew reported smoke on board. The aircraft excursed from the runway during landing, sustaining minor damage. All 109 people on board evacuated the aircraft with no injuries. The NTSB determined that the captain had failed to properly manage the warning about smoke, which was actually erroneous and had been caused by contamination. No smoke was found on board the aircraft.

== See also ==
- Louisiana World War II Army Airfields
