= Alexandria International Airport (Louisiana) =

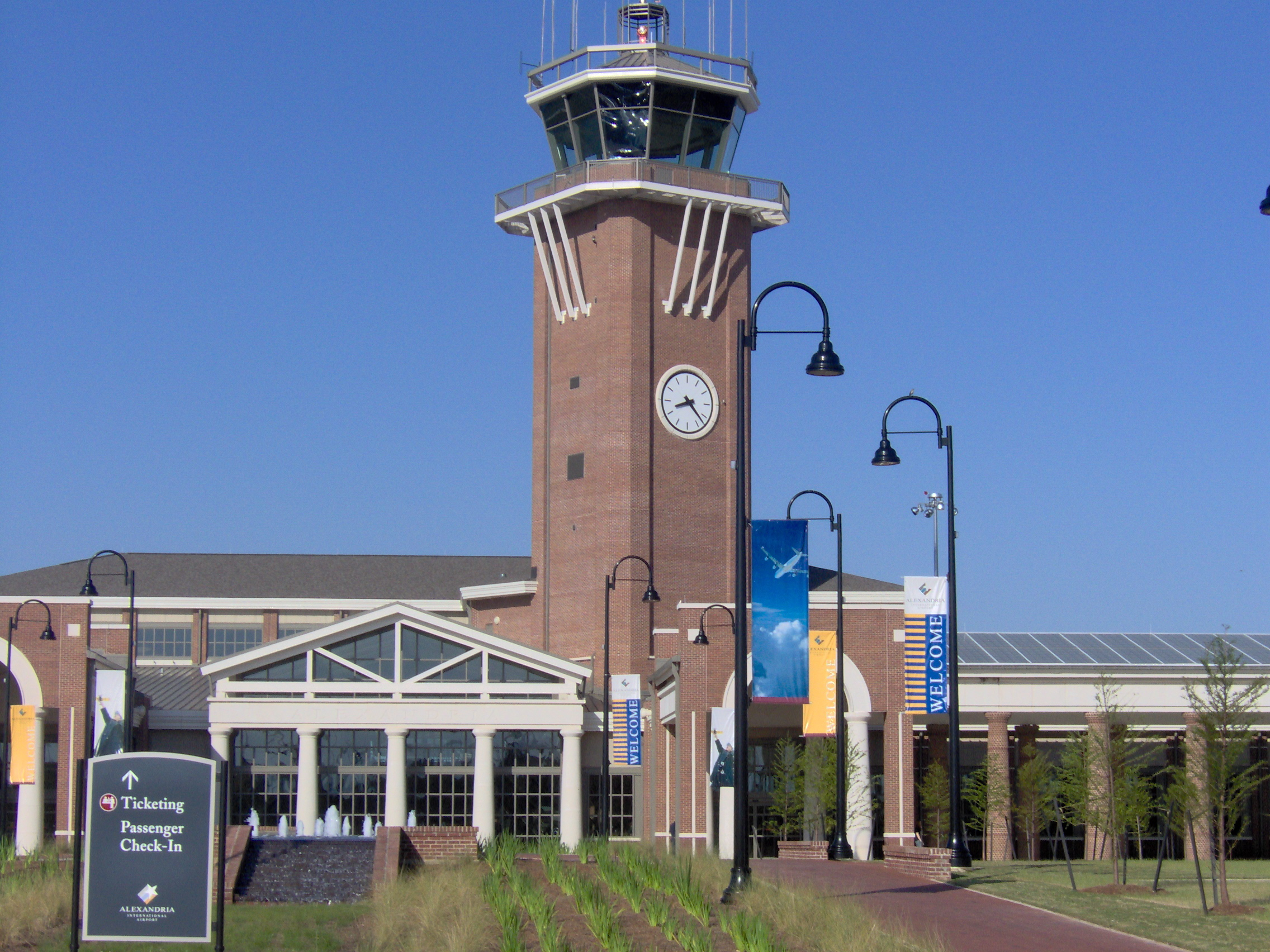
- AEX Upgraded Passenger Terminal, 2007
- IATA: AEX; ICAO: KAEX; FAA LID: AEX

Summary
- Airport type: Public
- Owner: England Authority
- Serves: Alexandria, Louisiana
- Elevation AMSL: 88 ft (27 m)
- Coordinates: 31°19′39″N 92°32′55″W
- Website: englandairpark.org

Map
- Location of airport in Louisiana AEX (the United States)

Runways
Direction	Length		Surface
Direction	ft	m	Surface
14/32	9,352	2,850	Concrete
18/36	7,001	2,134	Asphalt/concrete

Statistics (2022)
- Aircraft operations: 30,130
- Based aircraft: 55
- Source: Federal Aviation Administration

Alexandria International Airport (IATA: AEX, ICAO: KAEX, FAA LID: AEX) is a public use airport in unincorporated Rapides Parish, Louisiana, United States, located 4 nautical miles (4.6 mi; 7.4 km) west of the central business district of Alexandria. The airport is operated by the England Authority, also known as the England Economic and Industrial Development District, an independent political subdivision of the State of Louisiana. Although international commercial flight operations are not conducted, charter flights for the U.S. military to international destinations are routinely conducted from the airfield with this activity including the transportation of U.S. troops to overseas locations.

This airport is included in the National Plan of Integrated Airport Systems for 2011–2015, which categorized it as a primary commercial service airport. As per Federal Aviation Administration records, the airport had 142,223 passenger boardings (enplanements) in calendar year 2008, 154,736 enplanements in 2009, and 179,129 in 2010.

Prior to 1992, the facility was known as England Air Force Base, which was a front-line United States Air Force base which was opened during World War II and was used during the Cold War.

== History ==
Alexandria International Airport (AEX) traces its beginnings back to 1939 when it served as an emergency airstrip for Esler Airfield, which was about 10 miles northeast of what would become Alexandria International. However, on the eve of World War II, the air strip was taken over by the Department of Defense and named Alexandria Army Air Base. The airbase was used for training pilots and aircrews of fighter and bomber airplanes of the Army Air Force. After World War II ended, the base was placed on standby status in early 1946 and was eventually turned over to the city of Alexandria for use as a municipal airport. With the outbreak of hostilities in Korea, the base was reactivated as Alexandria Air Force Base in 1950.

On June 23, 1955, Alexandria Army Air Base was renamed England Air Force Base in honor of Lieutenant Colonel John Brooke England, who died on November 17, 1954. John England was the commander of the 389th Bomber Squadron stationed at the base. England died while attempting to land in dense fog in France. During his approach, he ran out of fuel and sacrificed himself by steering away from a barracks and into a nearby field, where he crashed and was killed.

At the end of the Cold War, the United States Department of Defense wanted to close many of its military bases including England Air Force Base. The city of Alexandria feared that the economic impact of the airfield closing would devastate the economy, so the city of Alexandria created the England Economic and Industrial Development District (England Authority) to take over the base for the purpose of creating a major air transport resource for the region and the state.

After the application by the England Authority and the recommendation from the FAA, the Department of Defense granted all airside and landside areas to the England Authority. In August 1993, Alexandria International Airport opened for service. And in August 1996, Alexandria International began to receive commercial airline passenger service with flights to and from Atlanta (ATL), Dallas/Ft. Worth (DFW), Houston (IAH) and Memphis (MEM), although service to Memphis was subsequently discontinued. Alexandria had previously been served by commercial airline flights operated from Esler Airfield (ESF) located near Pineville, Louisiana.

Since the September 11 terrorist attacks, Alexandria International Airport has played an important role in moving thousands of military personnel and millions of pounds of cargo in support of the wars in Iraq and Afghanistan. The United States military, under a commercial lease with the England Authority, invested nearly $60 million in airfield facilities including the hazardous cargo loading/unloading aprons, a military passenger processing facility, Military Air Cargo Apron and resurfacing Runway 18.

Alexandria International Airport also played an important role in storm recovery efforts following hurricanes Katrina and Rita. The airport was designated by the Louisiana Department of Transportation as a disaster relief staging and support area, and also served as a command center location for the coordination of aircraft and supplies as well as acting as a staging location for troops and workers who were involved in the recovery effort.

In February 2004, Air Force One landed at the airport with President George W. Bush on board. This Boeing 747-200B (U.S. Air Force aircraft designation VC-25A) is one of the largest aircraft to have ever visited AEX. President Bill Clinton also landed at the airfield on board Air Force One during his presidency. However, the largest aircraft ever to have landed at the airport appears to be the Lockheed C-5 Galaxy military jet transport operated by the U.S. Air Force.

On November 4, 2010, the Memphis Business Journal reported that Delta Connection, which operates passenger feeder services via a codesharing agreement with Delta Air Lines with regional jets, had ceased service on the Alexandria-Memphis route due to poor performance. This route had previously been flown by Northwest Airlink when Northwest Airlines was operating a connecting hub in Memphis. Delta acquired the Memphis hub when its merger with Northwest was completed and has since consolidated many of the former Memphis routes to its larger Atlanta hub. Alexandria continues to be served on a nonstop basis to and from Atlanta by the Delta Connection.

In July 2025, Alexandria International Airport was identified by The New York Times as the "busiest deportation hub" of the United States Immigration and Customs Enforcement (ICE) agency, with 80 more deportation flights than the second-busiest airport at press time. A detention facility with 400 beds and spanning 70,000 square feet, known as the 'Alexandria Staging Facility' run by The GEO Group is located on the airport's tarmac. An investigation into the facility found "a pattern of alleged due process violations, previously unreported accounts of neglect and abuse, documented health emergencies and long stays, despite the center’s intended use as a short-term detention facility"

== Facilities and aircraft ==
Alexandria International Airport covers an area of 3,212 acres (1,300 ha) at an elevation of 89 feet (27 m) above mean sea level. It has two runways: 14/32 is 9,352 by 150 feet (2,850 x 46 m) with a concrete surface; 18/36 is 7,001 by 150 feet (2,134 x 46 m) with an asphalt and concrete surface.

For the 12-month period ending December 31, 2022, the airport had 30,130 aircraft operations, an average of 82 per day: 51% general aviation, 25% military, 13% air taxi, and 11% scheduled commercial. 55 aircraft were then based at this airport: 31 single-engine, 7 multi-engine, 13 jet, and 4 helicopter.

The James L. Meyer Terminal is named for the first chairman of the England Airpark Authority. James Meyer, a Rapides Parish native who died in 1998, was a partner in the Alexandria-based civil engineering firm, Meyer, Meyer, LaCroix, and Hixson, and worked to establish the new airport. The terminal was dedicated in 2011, with Meyer's widow, Joy Sumner Meyer (1933–2013), speaking at the ceremony.

== Airlines and destinations ==
=== Passenger ===
Airlines	Destinations
American Eagle	Dallas/Fort Worth
Delta Connection	Atlanta
United Express	Houston–Intercontinental

=== Destinations map ===
Destinations map
Domestic destinations from Alexandria International Airport
Red = Year-round destination
Blue = Future destination
Pink = Destination being terminated

Delta Connection and American Eagle operate Canadair Regional Jet -700 and -900 aircraft while United Express operates CRJ-200 aircraft to Alexandria. In addition to scheduled passenger airline services, the airport has also handled numerous charters performed by large, widebody passenger aircraft (with an example being the McDonnell Douglas MD-11 jetliner) that were supporting military personnel transportation requirements.

=== Statistics ===
Carrier shares (August 2025 – July 2026)
Carrier	Passengers (arriving and departing)
Endeavor Air	113,000(51.94%)
Envoy Air	74,940(34.40%)
SkyWest Airlines	29,750(13.66%)

Top domestic destinations (August 2025 – July 2026)
Rank	Airport	Passengers	Airline
1	Hartsfield-Jackson Atlanta International (ATL)	55,760	Delta
2	Dallas/Fort Worth International (DFW)	49,460	American
3	Houston–Intercontinental (IAH)	4,440	United

== Governance ==
Alexandria International Airport is owned by the England Economic and Industrial Development District (England Authority). Sandra McQuain is the executive director of the England Authority and Scott Gammel is the Airport Manager.

The England Authority has ten members of the Board of Commissioners. William Barron is the chairman of the board of Commissioners. Brady Baudin is the vice-chairman and Bart Jones is the Secretary/Treasurer. The other members of the Board include Richard Bushnell, Dennis Frazier, Curman Gains, Scott Linzay, Joe McPherson, and Charlie Weems.

== Noise mitigation program ==
Alexandria International Airport and the England Authority are implementing a Neighborhood Noise Mitigation Program, with funding from the Federal Aviation Administration's Airport Improvement Program and the Louisiana Department of Transportation. The Neighborhood Noise Mitigation Program includes residential and other noise sensitive buildings in areas surrounding the Airport. The program was approved by the FAA on August 14, 2007, as part of AEX's Airport Noise Compatibility Program. The Noise Compatibility Program determined that eligible buildings should be prioritized to family residences, institutions, and community facilities.

As of November 2010, the England Authority has received $21 million from the FAA for their Noise Mitigation Program. The funding has been used for land acquisitions, relocation programs, and acoustical treatment programs.

The Neighborhood Noise Mitigation Program is divided into two areas. The primary area includes the areas that are located where they are subjected to 70 DNL or greater. The secondary area includes areas that are located in areas that are subjected to 65 to 70 DNL. The areas affected were designated from the 2010 Part 150 Noise Study.

Three options were approved for the primary areas. The first is the Property Acquisition and Relocation Assistance Program. The program was designed by the FAA to provide homeowners on a voluntary basis the opportunity to sell their property and move away from areas impacted by aircraft noise.

The second option is the Aviation Easement Acquisition Program. The program gives interested homeowners a single cash payment in exchange for providing the England Authority with a signed Aviation Easement document.

The third option is an Acoustical Treatment Program. This provides a range of acoustic modifications to participating homes. The program may include window and door modifications, wall and attic insulation, and ventilation modifications. All modifications done to the home through the program are free to the homeowner.

Properties in the Secondary Area are eligible only for the Aviation Easement Acquisition and the Acoustical Treatment Programs.

== England AFB Heritage Park ==
A sign at the heritage park, also known as England Airpark, and Flying Tiger Heritage Park, reads: "A symbol of all airmen past, present, and future, the England Air Force Base Heritage Park is a proud reminder of the Air Force’s role in our nation’s military history. Each of the five aircraft displayed here valiantly contributed to the defense of our country. They are suspended in simulated flight as a permanent reminder of the courage, dedication, and sacrifice of the men and women who have served their country as members of the finest Air Force in the world."

In 2026, the aircraft heritage park, on the same site as the largest United States hub for deportation flights, is a site for construction of a family and children detention facility.

The aircraft at the heritage park are described below, as seen at the park, from left to right (west to east, clockwise).

Identity (S/N or BuNo)	Aircraft	History	Photo
52-4931	North American F-86F Sabre	Built as a North American F-86F-30-NA Sabre (MSN 191–627). The National Museum of the US Air Force ‘aircraft on loan’ list, lists this aircraft as a F-86E. The sign at the aircraft says this plane has been painted to duplicate the aircraft flown by Lt Col John England, for whom England AFB is named. This plane is actually a Canadian built CL-13A Mk 5, serial number 23226.	
152660 (Navy BuNo)	Ling-Temco-Vought A-7A Corsair II	Built as a Ling-Temco-Vought A-7A-3a-CV Corsair II. The sign at the aircraft says it is painted to duplicate a past 23 TFW commander's aircraft.	
73-1667	Fairchild Republic A-10A Thunderbolt II	Built as a Fairchild Republic A-10A Thunderbolt II. The National Museum of the US Air Force ‘aircraft on loan’ list, lists this aircraft as an A-10A(GY).	
63-8296	Republic F-105G Thunderchief	Built as a Republic F-105F-1-RE Thunderchief (MSN F73) and later converted to F-105G. To MASDC July 14, 1980, then to display at England AFB Heritage Park.	
52-7080	Republic F-84F Thunderstreak	Built as a Republic F-84F-40-RE Thunderstreak. On April 23, 1963, this aircraft crashed at the end of runway 22 at MacDill Air Force Base; the pilot was uninjured. According to the sign in front of the aircraft, this plane was previously at Bringhurst Park in Alexandria, and was unveiled at its current location on April 25, 1992, during a 391st FBS homecoming.	

== Accidents at or near AEX ==
On September 6, 1955, a USAF Kaiser-Frazer Fairchild C-119 Flying Boxcar crashed after takeoff due to engine failure 3.1 miles north of then Alexandria-England AFB. Four of the six crew on board were killed.

On April 20, 2018, A McDonnell Douglas MD-83 (registration N807WA) operated by World Atlantic Airlines suffered a right-hand main landing gear collapse during landing rollout. Due to the gear failure, the right wing dragged on the runway, creating a friction fire which was quickly put out by the airport rescue and firefighting personnel. The aircraft operated on a flight on behalf of the U.S. Immigration and Customs Enforcement and originated from Chicago-O'Hare International Airport. None of the 101 passengers on board were injured, but the aircraft suffered significant damage and was later written off as irreparable. As of April 5, 2024, it still occupies the South Ramp.

== See also ==
- List of airports in Louisiana
