= Northeastern International Airways =

US low-cost airline (1982–1986)

| IATA | ICAO | Call sign |
|---|---|---|
| QS | QSA | NORTHEASTER |
- Founded: 1980; 46 years ago
- Commenced operations: 1982; 44 years ago
- Ceased operations: 1986; 40 years ago
- Parent company: Northeastern International Airways, Inc.
- Headquarters: Ft. Lauderdale, Florida

Northeastern International Airways (IATA: QS, ICAO: QSA, call sign: Northeaster) was a low-fare airline established in 1980 and based in Ft. Lauderdale, Florida. Between 1982 and 1985, the airline operated scheduled passenger flights in the northeastern United States, Florida, California and Oklahoma, and also served Kansas City, Missouri; Las Vegas, Nevada; Little Rock, Arkansas; and New Orleans, Louisiana where the airline operated a small hub during the summer of 1984.

== History ==
Northeastern International Airways was founded by Stephen Quinto and commenced operations on February 11, 1982, between Long Island MacArthur Airport in Islip and Fort Lauderdale-Hollywood International Airport using one Douglas DC-8 aircraft. The airline expanded rapidly; by the end of 1983, it served eleven cities in eight states, with its schedule consisting of flights to Florida from northeast, central and western US cities. At this time, the fleet consisted of five Boeing 727 and four Douglas DC-8 jetliners, and the airline had approximately 425 employees.

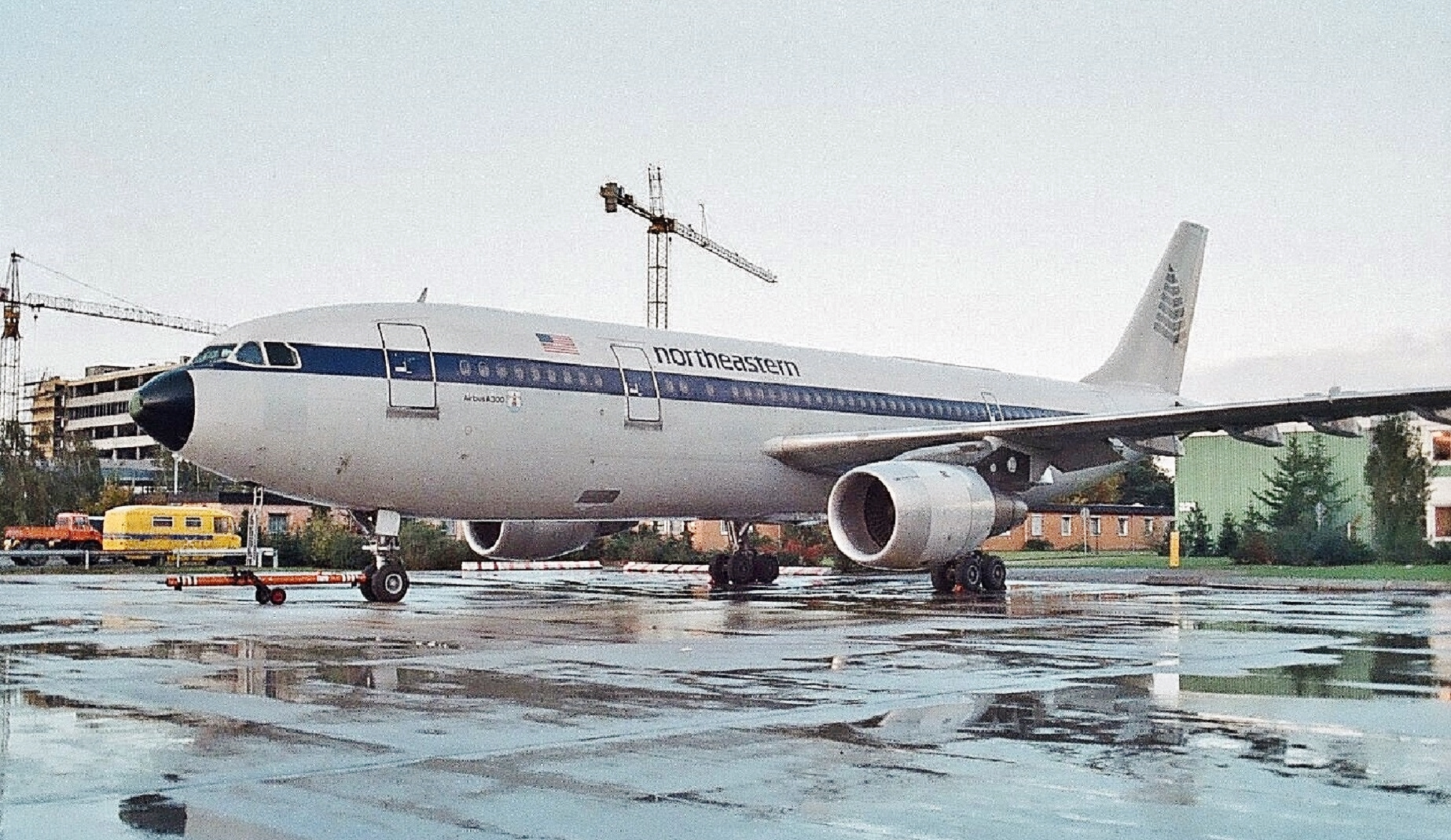
Northeastern Airbus A300 at Frankfurt, 1984

Between its startup and the end of 1982, Northeastern International had a net loss of $1.4 million, with $17.6 million in revenue. During the first half of 1983, the airline made a $953,000 profit on $10.8 million in revenue. In January 1984, Northeastern announced plans to lease two (2) widebody Airbus A300 aircraft, to be used in expanding service from John F. Kennedy International Airport to Florida destinations as well as providing flights between Florida, New Orleans and Los Angeles. The airline was leasing four A300 jets at one point, two from Lufthansa and two from Airbus, and was the second U.S. based air carrier to operate the A300 in scheduled passenger service with Eastern Air Lines being the first to do so.

The 1984 summer system timetable for the airline listed Airbus A300 widebody jetliners being operated on the following routes:

- Miami (MIA) - New York (JFK)
- Fort Lauderdale (FLL) - New York (JFK)
- Orlando (MCO) - New York (JFK)
- Orlando (MCO) - New Orleans (MSY)
- Miami (MIA) - New Orleans (MSY) - Los Angeles (LAX)

Unfortunately, rapid expansion resulted in the airline being unprofitable. During the fiscal year ending on 31 March, Northeastern lost $5.2 million, with $64.7 million in revenue. During the summer of 1984, the airline operated 66 daily flights to seventeen cities in ten states, with sixteen aircraft and 1,400 employees. During the first six months of 1984, the airline had the highest load factor of any carrier in the United States, measuring 71.5 percent. In May of that year, it also became the 19th largest airline in the US as measured by revenue passenger miles.

According to the airline's system timetable dated May 1, 1984, Northeastern International was operating a small hub at the New Orleans International Airport (MSY) with nonstop and/or direct no change of plane jet service to Boston (BOS), Fort Lauderdale (FLL), Hartford/Springfield (BDL), Kansas City (MCI), Las Vegas (LAS), Little Rock (LIT), Los Angeles (LAX), Miami (MIA), New York Kennedy Airport (JFK), Oklahoma City (OKC), Orlando (MCO), St. Petersburg/Clearwater (PIE), San Diego (SAN), Tulsa (TUL) and West Palm Beach (PBI).

In November, the airline agreed to lease ten (10) Boeing 727s from bankrupt Braniff International Airways,; however, the deal was blocked the following month by Braniff's bankruptcy judge who cited the fact that the aircraft in question were owned by Braniff's creditors. Northeastern was then forced to suspend service to five destinations.

On 8 January 1985, Northeastern International filed for Chapter 11 bankruptcy protection. The airline also announced a plan to cut its operations to sixteen (16) daily flights from Florida to Chicago, Philadelphia and New York, using three Boeing 727 aircraft. According to its filing, the airline had $28 million in assets and $48 million in liabilities, as well $15 million in debts to 1,500 creditors. However, in March three of the aircraft were repossessed, and in August it was announced that JEI Airlines, which despite its name did not operate scheduled airline service, had acquired Northeastern, which at that point had downsized and was only serving New York, Philadelphia, St. Petersburg and Fort Lauderdale. Despite its stated intention to expand after the purchase by JEI, the company was then liquidated during 1986.

== Destinations in 1984 ==
According to the system timetable for the airline at this time, the following destinations were being served in June 1984.

- Boston, MA (BOS)
- Fort Lauderdale, FL (FLL) - Headquarters
- Hartford, CT (BDL)
- Kansas City, MO (MCI)
- Las Vegas, NV (LAS)
- Little Rock, AR (LIT)
- Long Island/Macarthur, NY (ISP) - Base
- Los Angeles, CA (LAX)
- Miami, FL (MIA)
- New Orleans, LA (MSY) - Small hub
- New York City, NY (JFK)
- Oklahoma City, OK (OKC)
- Orlando, FL (MCO)
- St. Petersburg/Clearwater, FL (PIE)
- San Diego, CA (SAN)
- Tulsa, OK (TUL)
- West Palm Beach, FL (PBI)

== Fleet ==
- Airbus A300
- Boeing 727-100
- Boeing 727-200
- Douglas DC-8-52
- Douglas DC-8-62

== See also ==
- List of defunct airlines of the United States
