= Elmira Corning Regional Airport =

Elmira/Corning Regional Airport

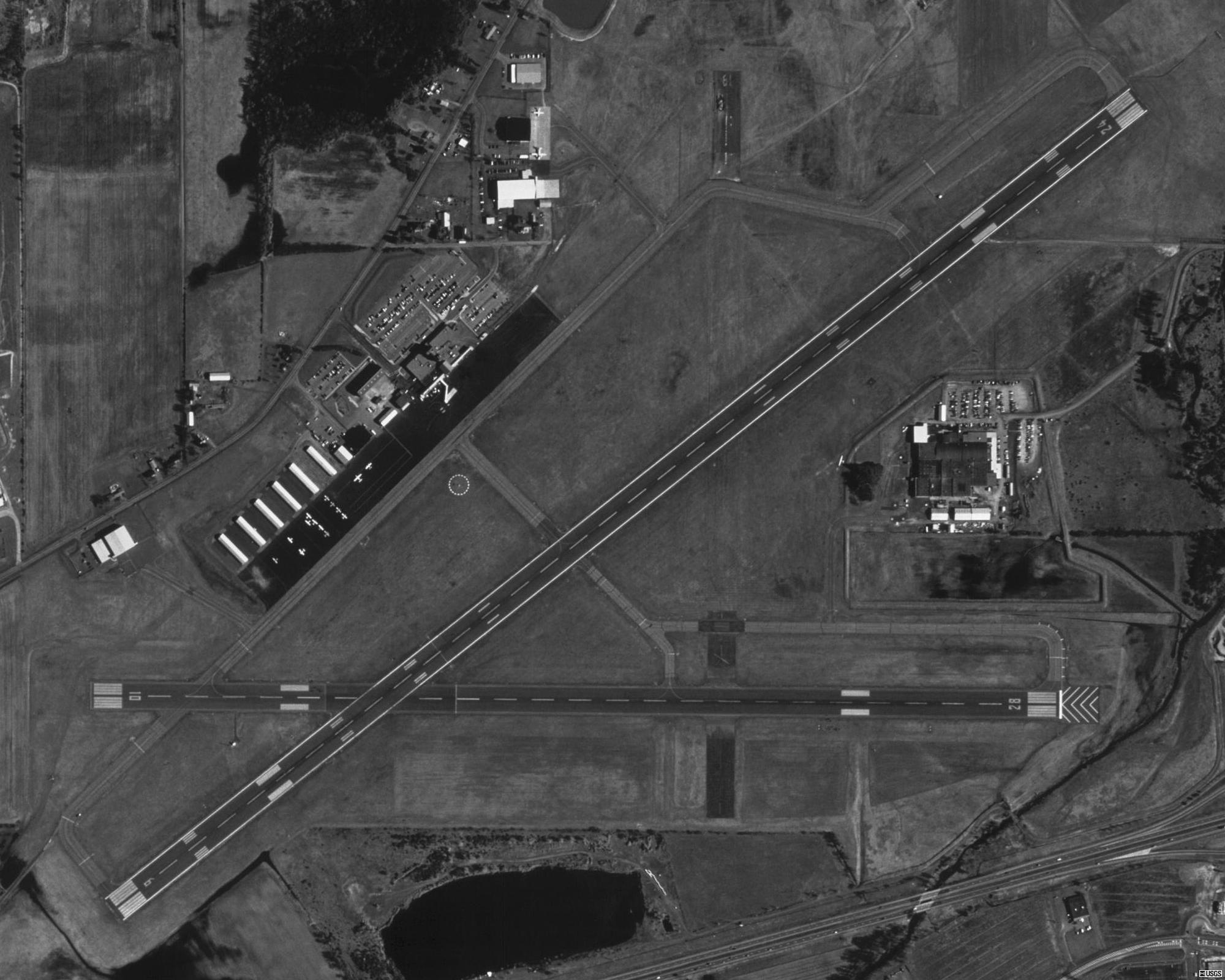
- USGS image – 22 April 1994
- IATA: ELM; ICAO: KELM; FAA LID: ELM

Summary
- Airport type: Public
- Owner: County of Chemung
- Serves: Elmira, New York; Corning, New York
- Location: Big Flats Town; Horseheads postal address
- Elevation AMSL: 954 ft (291 m)
- Coordinates: 42°09′36″N 076°53′30″W
- Website: flyelm.com

Maps
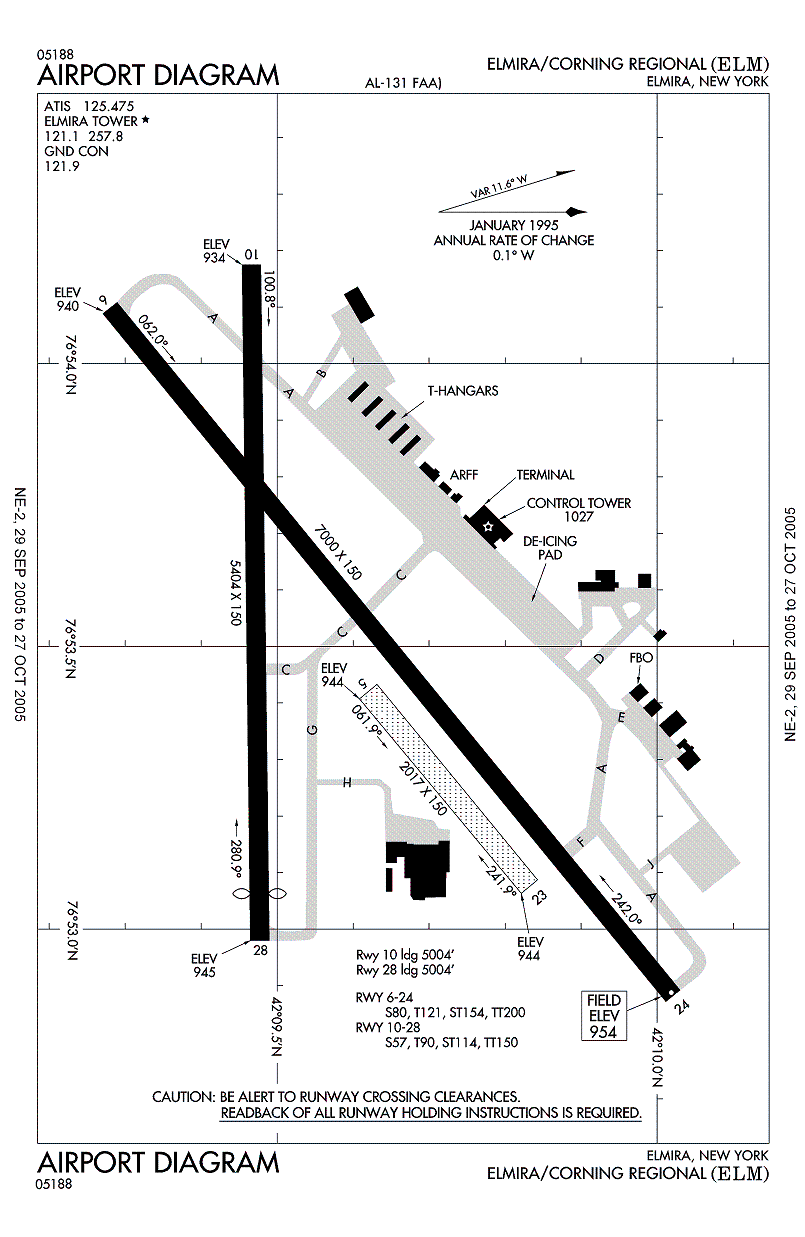
- FAA airport diagram
- Interactive map of Elmira/Corning Regional Airport

Runways
Direction	Length		Surface
Direction	ft	m	Surface
06/24	8,001	2,439	Asphalt
10/28	5,404	1,647	Asphalt
05/23	2,017	615	Turf

Statistics (2013)
- Aircraft operations: 22,164
- Based aircraft: 33
- Source: Federal Aviation Administration

Elmira Corning Regional Airport (IATA: ELM, ICAO: KELM, FAA LID: ELM) is in Chemung County, New York, 7 miles (11 km) northwest of Elmira and 8 miles (13 km) east of Corning. It is in the Big Flats census-designated place and in the town of Big Flats, while its mailing address gives the location as Horseheads, New York. The airport was formerly Elmira Regional Airport.

Situated just north of the Southern Tier Expressway (Interstate 86), the airport serves the Southern Tier of New York and Northern Tier of Pennsylvania with airline flights, general aviation, and glider activities. Other airports in the area include Greater Binghamton Airport and Ithaca Tompkins International Airport, with Greater Rochester International Airport and Syracuse Hancock International Airport lying farther afield.

== Facilities ==
The airport covers 1,000 acres (400 ha) at an elevation of 954 feet (291 m). It has three runways: 6/24 is 8,001 by 150 feet (2,439 x 46 m) asphalt; 10/28 is 5,404 by 150 feet (1,647 x 46 m) asphalt; 5/23 is 2,017 by 150 feet (615 x 46 m) turf.

The airport had three paved runways about 4000 feet long in a north–south, east–west and northeast–southwest orientation in the early years, but the northeast–southwest runway was 4702 feet in length by 1960, was extended to 5604 feet by the 1960s with later extensions to 7000 feet and 7600 feet before its present length of 8001 feet. The east–west runway was extended to about 5200 feet by the early 1980s and the north–south runway was abandoned and the additional roughly 200 feet of the east–west runway was added by converting part of the overrun on the east end of the runway to usable pavement (for takeoff), but then the landing threshold was displaced about 400 feet.

In the year ending June 30, 2013 the airport had 22,164 aircraft operations, average 61 per day: 51% general aviation, 33% air taxi, 13% airline and 2% military. 33 aircraft were then based at the airport: 52% single-engine, 15% multi-engine, 30% jet, and 3% helicopter. Airport services include free wireless Internet, automatic teller machines (ATM), conference rooms, and a restaurant.

=== Airlines ===
There were 2 passenger and 3 cargo airlines as of late 2024. The passenger airlines are:

- Allegiant Air
- Delta Connection operated by SkyWest Airlines on behalf of Delta Air Lines

Low-cost carrier Allegiant Air has the only scheduled mainline flights, on Airbus A319s, Airbus A320s, and 737 MAXs. Delta Connection service is flown with CRJ-700s and CRJ-900s.

Mohawk /Allegheny/USAir flew to Elmira until 2001 when its affiliate took over; Elmira's first jets were Mohawk BAC-111s in 1965. The airport had flights on Capital Airlines, which merged with United in 1961; United left Elmira in 1966. Air North and Empire Airlines also served the airport in the 1980s.

United Airlines regional flights to Chicago-O’hare started in 2014 and ended in 2016. In 2018 United served a new route to Newark. The route was eventually switched to Washington-Dulles; that ended January 6, 2020.

=== Fixed-base operators ===
There are two FBO's (Fixed Base Operators) on the airport that are separate from the commercial airline terminal. These include Atlantic Aviation and Premier Aviation. Both provide with landing fees: Ramp Parking, Fueling, Deicing and Hangar space for general aviation aircraft. Premier Aviation also has specialized maintenance services available.

=== Wings of Eagles ===
An aviation museum, the Wings of Eagles Discovery Center, is near the airport. The museum has about 20 display aircraft or full-size replicas.

=== Renovation ===
In 2016 the airport received a $40 million grant from the state for a major redesign. The improvements aimed to increase airport passenger space, add two new jet bridges, 300 parking spaces, and a 3,000 square foot bar and restaurant. On November 2, 2018, Governor Andrew Cuomo announced that the renovations were complete.

== Airlines and destinations ==
=== Passenger ===
Airlines	Destinations
Allegiant Air	Orlando/Sanford, St. Petersburg/Clearwater; Seasonal: Myrtle Beach, Punta Gorda (FL), Sarasota
Delta Connection	Detroit

Passenger destinations map
Domestic destinations from Elmira Corning Regional Airport
Red = Year-round destination
Green = Seasonal destination
Blue = Future destination

== Statistics ==
=== Top destinations ===
Busiest domestic routes from ELM (September 2024 – August 2025)
Rank	City	Passengers	Carriers
1	Detroit, Michigan	45,610	Delta
2	Orlando/Sanford, Florida	26,420	Allegiant
3	St. Petersburg/Clearwater, Florida	17,480	Allegiant
4	Punta Gorda, Florida	8,030	Allegiant
5	Sarasota, Florida	2,480	Allegiant

== Accidents and incidents ==
On May 6, 1944, a Lockheed C-60 LodeStar on an military training flight crashed into a mountain around 7 miles west of the airport during a third attempt to land in poor visibility. They were originally going toward Newark, but due to the poor weather mid-flight, they rerouted to this airport. All of the 6 occupants were killed.

On November 8, 1945, a fighter jet collided mid air with a bomber. They were there to raise money, as well as tourism. All of the 6 passengers on both planes died.

On June 23, 1967 Mohawk Airlines Flight 40, a BAC One-Eleven, crashed in Blossburg, Pennsylvania, shortly after taking off from Elmira/Corning, killing all 34 persons (30 passengers and 4 crew) on board.

On January 18, 1992, a Douglas DC-9 experienced severe wind gusts during its landing flare, resulting in the plane having a extremely hard landing. This resulted with the rear of the fuselage bending downward, and cracks at the fuselage near the wings. 2 serious injuries occurred.

On February 1, 2012, A twin-engine Ameriflight plane carrying UPS cargo suffered a landing gear failure while touching down at the airport. The aircraft safely crash-landed on its belly. The pilot was unhurt, but the incident triggered the airport's highest alert level and temporarily closed the runway.

On February 14, 2016 A private Cessna 310N experienced a landing gear collapse immediately upon touching down at ELM. The pilot, the only person on board, escaped without injuries. The aircraft sustained only minor damage, and the airport reopened 10 minutes after the crash.

== See also ==
- List of airports in New York (disambiguation)
