= Empire Airlines (1974–1986) =

1974–1986 US airline that merged into Piedmont

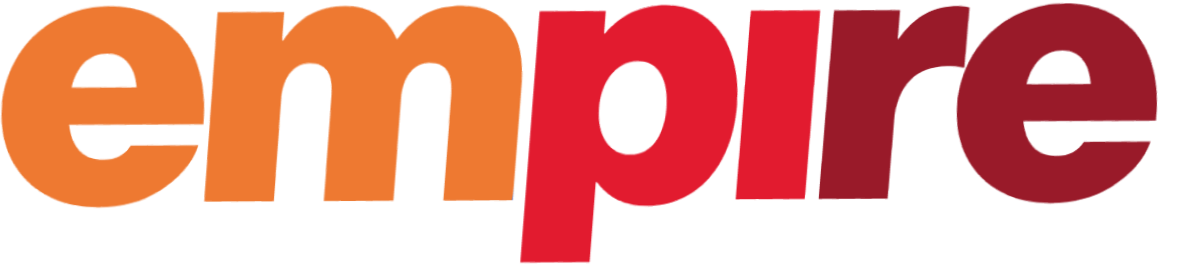
IATA	ICAO	Call sign
UR	EMP	EMPIRE
- Founded: 27 December 1974; 51 years ago as Oneida County Aviation
- Commenced operations: 22 September 1975; 51 years ago
- Ceased operations: 1 May 1986; 40 years ago (merged into Piedmont Airlines)
- Operating bases: Utica, New York
- Hubs: Syracuse, New York, United States
- Alliance: Pan Am
- Fleet size: See Fleet
- Destinations: See Destinations
- Founder: Paul Quackenbush
- Employees: 1,000

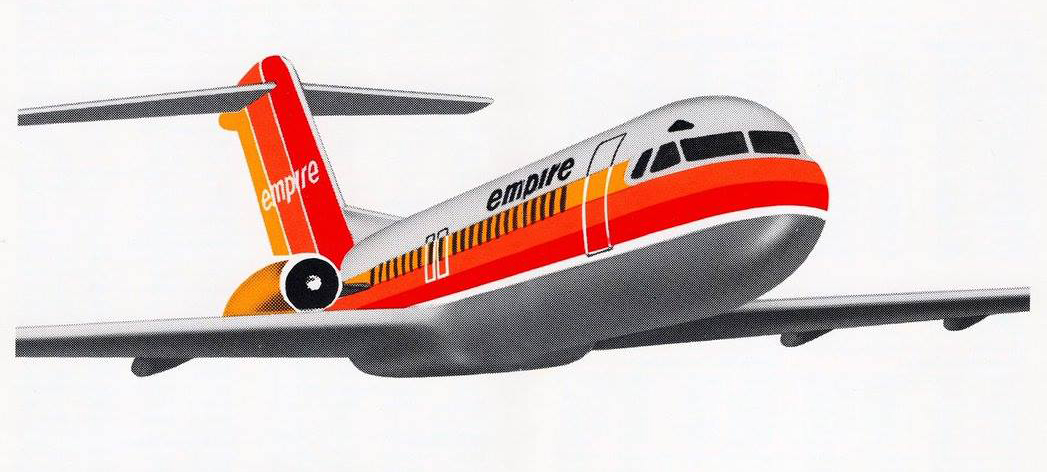

Empire Airlines was a small jet airline serving mainly New York and adjacent states with the stated aim to be "chief airline for the Empire State." Empire was a small but notable deregulation success, pulling itself up by its bootstraps and achieving industry recognition. Empire stayed break-even or better, despite aggressive competition by much larger and/or better capitalized airlines, the turbulence of the early deregulation era, and many years of substantial expansion. The airline achieved annual revenues of about $90mm (over $250mm in 2024 dollars) before accepting a purchase offer from Piedmont Airlines in October 1985. The transaction closed in early 1986 and after a brief period, Empire merged into Piedmont. Piedmont itself merged into USAir in 1989 which, many years later, merged with American Airlines in 2015.

Founded by Paul Quackenbush, Empire Airlines began with a base at Oneida County Airport serving the Utica-Rome metropolitan area. Empire leveraged the withdrawal of legacy airlines from Upstate New York and the collapse of other new-entrant competitors. It tapped capital markets frequently to finance expansion. It innovated: Empire's codeshare with Pan Am at New York Kennedy Airport was cited by former American Airlines CEO Robert Crandall as the first such international codeshare. This not only brought incremental traffic to Empire, but helped set it apart from other small carriers at a time when the Pan Am name still meant something. Empire expanded throughout the early 1980s to destinations throughout New York state, most adjacent states, including Maryland and the national capital in Washington D.C., and Ottawa and Montreal in Canada with a final fleet of 15 Fokker F28 jets.

== History ==
=== Early days and certification ===
The airline was incorporated as Oneida County Aviation, Inc. in late 1974, a fixed base operator located at the now-closed Oneida County Airport, then the commercial airport serving the Utica-Rome metropolitan area. Paul Quackenbush invested $25,000 initially (over $150,000 in 2024 dollars), expanding the capital base in two rounds of private offerings in 1976 and 1977 for $160,000 and $250,000 respectively. The airline first flew as a Part 298 carrier, before getting its airline certificate from the Civil Aeronautics Board (CAB) on October 13, 1979 as Oneida County Aviation, Inc. dba Empire Airlines. However, the name of the company was by then already Empire Airlines, Inc. as of September 19, 1979 Empire leveraged the deregulation-driven pullout of Allegheny Airlines from parts of Upstate New York, like Utica.

As of the date of its CAB application (February 22, 1979) Empire's fleet comprised three Swearingen Metros and three Piper Navajos. A fourth Metro joined the fleet by the time the certificate was issued, and a fifth arrived shortly thereafter. 58.6% of the company was owned by Paul Quackenbush, his sister and brother-in-law, Peter Hager, a partner at Goldman Sachs. The presence of a Goldman Sachs partner as a significant shareholder presumably helps explain the success the small airline had in the capital markets. The CAB certified Empire for Utica to Buffalo, Washington D.C., and Boston, and, via Syracuse, to New York, Newark, NJ and Hartford, CT. Empire was also approved for Utica to Hartford via Albany, NY.

=== Jet transition ===
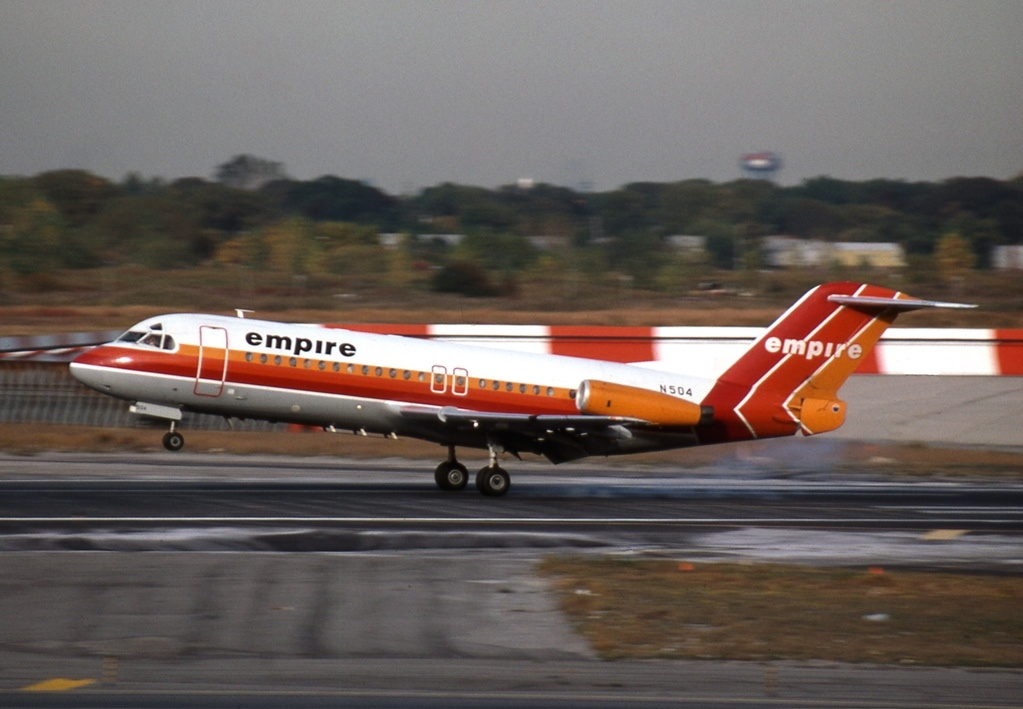
Fokker F28-4000 October 1984 at New York Kennedy

In early 1980, Empire was just one of over a half-dozen turboprop operators in New York State trying to backfill for Allegheny and other bigger carriers in the wake of deregulation. What set Empire apart was that, CAB certification in hand, it immediately ordered two Fokker F28-4000 jets. The first was put into service on September 15, 1980 between Utica and New York. Empire's initial public offering of 150,000 shares at $6.50 on May 12, 1980 reinforced its balance sheet.

In 1981, American Airlines dumped short-haul Upstate New York routes like Buffalo and Rochester to New York, citing the widespread disruption caused by the air traffic controller strike of August 1981. This created opened further opportunity for Empire.

Empire frequently tapped the capital markets to finance expansion. In December 1981 it raised almost $5mm from the sale of 550,000 shares at $9/share. In January 1983, it raised another $2.9mm from the sale of 650,000 shares at $4.50 and went back to the markets in December of the same year to raise $3.75mm from the sale of 600,000 shares at $6.75.

Empire Airlines Financial and Other Statistics, 1980 thru 1985
(000)^{(1)}	1980	1981	1982	1983	1984	1985^{(2)}
Op revenue($)	9,254	23,342	35,627	49,412	76,894	68,369
Op profit (loss)($)	583	983	(695)	4,553		
Net profit (loss)($)	108	522	495	2,006	2,253	(1,442)
Op margin	6.3%	4.2%	-2.0%	9.2%		
Net margin	1.2%	2.2%	1.4%	4.1%	2.9%	-2.1%
Passengers	159.3	409.1	562.8	701.0	1,070.0	
YE F28 count	2	3	5	6	11	15
(1) Other than margin & F28 count. (2) Financial information for 9 months ending September 30, 1985.

=== Cooperation and competition ===
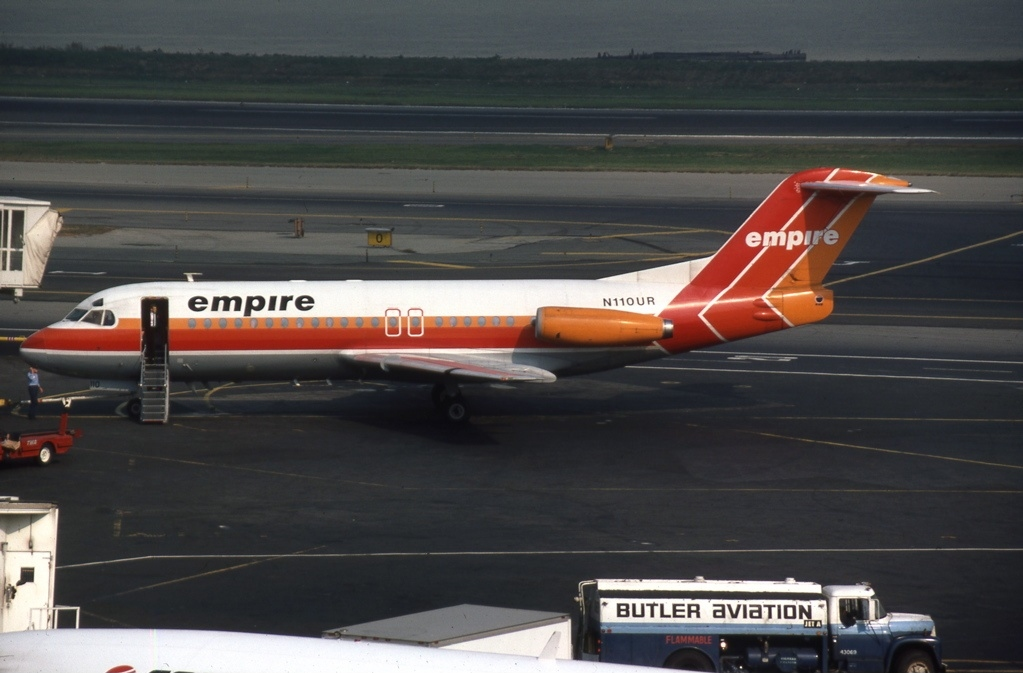
Fokker F28-4000 October 1984 at New York LaGuardia

Empire's cooperation with Pan Am, dubbed "Empire Pan Am Express," started December 15, 1982 and initially included through ticketing, including Empire printing boarding passes for Pan Am flights and vice versa, as well as ability to earn miles on Pan Am's frequent flyer program. Code sharing started in 1983, according to Robert Crandall (see above). Quackenbush said that in 1984, 80,000 Empire passengers connected to/from Pan Am, a year in which Empire flew 1.07mm passengers total. Empire also participated in Northwest's frequent flyer program on connecting tickets between Empire and Northwest.

Empire's success garnered industry recognition: in early 1985, Empire was awarded Air Transport World 's "Regional Airline of the Year 1984." Ironically, Piedmont Airlines won "Airline of the Year 1984".

Apart from USAir, which despite having withdrawn from some New York State routes remained Empire's main competition, Empire competed against aggressive and much larger deregulation startups such as People Express (which served routes like Newark to Buffalo and Rochester) and New York Air (which served Rochester to LaGuardia Airport). Turboprop competitors included the well-financed Brockway Air, owned by Brockway Glass, a substantial Pennsylvania manufacturer. Interestingly, Piedmont signed up Brockway Air to be a Piedmont Commuter in January 1986, shortly before the Empire acquisition closed.

=== Acquisition ===
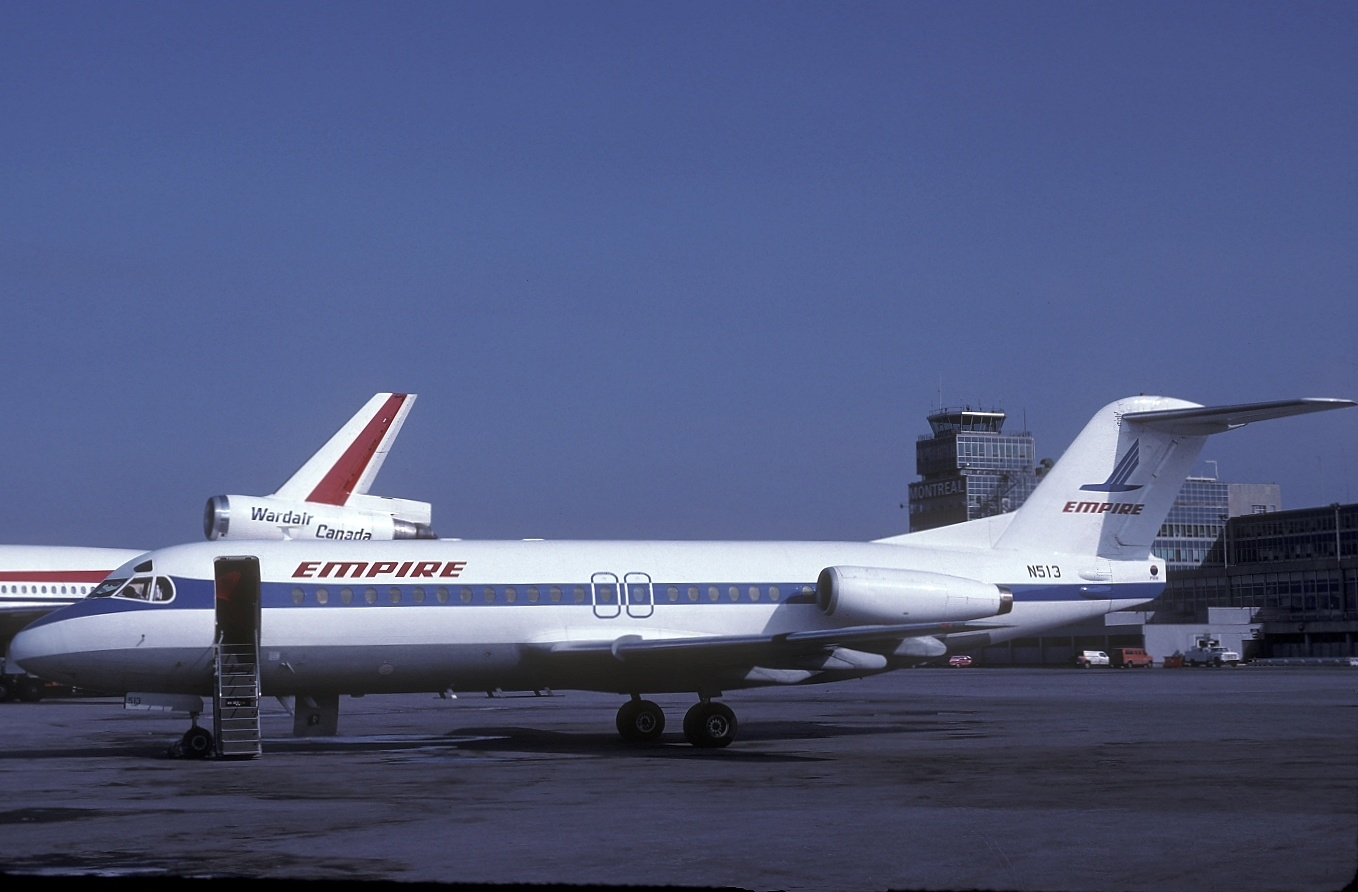
F28 in Piedmont livery with Empire titles, Montreal March 1986, between purchase and integration of Empire into Piedmont

Empire made significant changes in the summer of 1985. In July it announced it was moving its headquarters from Utica to Syracuse, driven in significant part by the convenience of collocating with its hub. Empire had 77 departures per day at Syracuse at the time. In August, in conjunction with a decision to purchase two more new F-28s to be delivered by year-end (taking the fleet to 15), Empire announced it was retiring its five Metro turboprops, becoming all jet.

However, in late September, Empire announced it had received an offer for the airline from an unnamed party, and on October 2, Piedmont announced it had an agreement to buy Empire. The acquisition allowed Piedmont to accelerate its expansion into New York State, which started in 1985 with service from Baltimore to Buffalo and Rochester. Other attractions to Piedmont included Empire's presence at key airports such as LaGuardia and Boston Logan. Empire's fleet fit seamlessly into that of Piedmont, which already operated F-28s. Further, Piedmont offered $15/share for Empire shares that had been trading at a bid-offer range of $9 to 9 1/8 the day before Empire announced it received an offer, so shareholders were well rewarded. Piedmont closed on the purchase on February 1, 1986. After operating as a separate subsidiary for three months, Empire merged into Piedmont on May 1, 1986. The 1985 Piedmont annual report noted that the $42mm transaction cost was less than the price of two 737-300s.

== Legacy ==
Empire was a type of carrier that essentially does not exist today. From a capacity standpoint, Empire's 33-inch pitch, 80-seat F-28s were comparable to today's regional jets, but had cabin-comfort comparable to DC-9s. Indeed, Empire's passengers sometimes confused the F-28s with DC-9s. Empire was deemed a regional airline according to the standards of the day, but merged into Piedmont, a major airline (which also flew F-28s). it largely flew under its own brand at a time when commuter airlines flying routes of comparable length were quickly aligning with major airlines. In today's terms it was a small mainline carrier.

Quackenbush negotiated with turbulent era of early U.S. airline deregulation with great success. Ordering jets while flying only a handful of 19-seat turboprops was a bold move that set Empire apart from the other small airlines of the age. There were no shortage of US carriers that started deregulation with many more advantages than Empire had, but failed. Airlines for America maintains a list of US airline bankruptcies and there are multivolume books devoted to chronicling the many airlines knocked-out after U.S. airline deregulation.

Unfortunately, most of Empire's legacy was destroyed by 1991 due to USAir's ill-fated mergers with Piedmont and Pacific Southwest Airlines.

Piedmont's acquisition of Empire accelerated its expansion into USAir territory and likely contributed to the urgency of USAir's March 1987 bid for Piedmont. This brought together two of the most successful post-deregulation airlines, along with Pacific Southwest Airlines, which USAir had also purchased. But these were cash purchases, saddling USAir with $2 billion in debt, at an airline that heretofore had avoided leveraging itself. The mergers were difficult and the timing inopportune, as in 1990 the world suffered an oil price shock, the US entered a recession and there was a collapse in international air travel driven by the Iraq's invasion of Kuwait. USAir generated six years of losses from 1989 through 1994 totaling over $3bn. USAir killed the former Empire hub in Syracuse in 1991 and by the end of 1995 (when USAir finally again showed a profit), USAir's F-28 fleet, inherited from Piedmont, numbered only 15, down from 45.

== Destinations ==
Empire's final network included 20 cities, 11 in New York State, plus Baltimore, Boston, Burlington (VT), Cleveland, Hartford, Newark and Washington D.C., and Ottawa and Montreal in Canada. Generally every city was connected to Syracuse but many routes overflew that hub, such as Buffalo or Rochester to New York and Boston.

- New York
  - Utica (Oneida County Airport)* - base
  - Albany (Albany International Airport)
  - Binghamton (Broome County Airport)
  - Buffalo (Buffalo Niagara International Airport)
  - Elmira (Elmira Corning Regional Airport)
  - Islip (Long Island MacArthur Airport)
  - Ithaca (Tompkins County Airport)
  - New York City (John F. Kennedy International Airport & LaGuardia Airport)
  - Rochester (Greater Rochester International Airport)
  - Syracuse (Syracuse Hancock International Airport) - hub
  - White Plains (Westchester County Airport)
- Connecticut
  - Hartford (Bradley International Airport)
- Maryland
  - Baltimore (Baltimore/Washington International Thurgood Marshall Airport)
- Massachusetts
  - Boston (Logan International Airport)
- New Jersey
  - Newark (Newark Liberty International Airport)
- Ohio
  - Cleveland (Cleveland Hopkins International Airport)
- Ontario, Canada
  - Ottawa (Ottawa Macdonald–Cartier International Airport)
- Quebec, Canada
  - Montreal, (Montreal-Dorval International Airport)
- Vermont
  - Burlington (Burlington International Airport)
- District of Columbia
  - Washington, D.C. (Washington National Airport)

== Fleet ==
World Airline Fleets 1979 (copyright 1979) shows Empire with:

- 2 Swearingen SA226TC Metroliner
- 2 Piper Navajo Chieftain
- 1 Piper Navajo

From early 1980 until it retired them at the end of 1985, Empire had five Metro turboprops. The number of F-28s steadily increased from two at the end of 1980 to 15 at the end of 1985. All were all new from the manufacturer except for four acquired used from defunct Altair Airlines at the end of 1983, which were put into the fleet in first half of 1984. The Altair aircraft were acquired on bargain terms from the Federal Aviation Administration (FAA) which had guaranteed the aircraft financings under a loan guarantee program. Empire was the only bidder for the aircraft which were acquired for $28.9mm, $10mm less than what the FAA paid to back the guarantee. The acquisition included three spare engines and other spare parts.

== See also ==
- List of defunct airlines of the United States
