= KBGM =

KBGM may refer to:

- The ICAO code for Greater Binghamton Airport
- KBGM (FM), a radio station (91.1 FM) licensed to Park Hills, Missouri, United States
