= Johnson City Airport =

Johnson City Airport may refer to:

- Greater Binghamton Airport (IATA: BGM), serving Johnson City, New York
- Tri-Cities Regional Airport (IATA: TRI), serving Johnson City, Tennessee
