= Patricia Banks Edmiston =

African-American flight attendant (born 1937)

Patricia Noisette Banks Edmiston (born April 27, 1937) is an American who was one of the first Black flight attendants. She combated discriminatory practices in the United States by initiating a legal action against Capital Airlines (merged into United Airlines in 1961) via the New York State Commission Against Discrimination. She won the case which led to the start of more airlines employing Black women.

Following her employment as a flight attendant, Banks Edmiston went on to work various roles in the substance abuse prevention industry. She continued her education and received a bachelor's degree from Empire State College. She served on the board of the Black Flight Attendants of America, and in 2010 was accepted into the Black Aviation Hall of Fame.

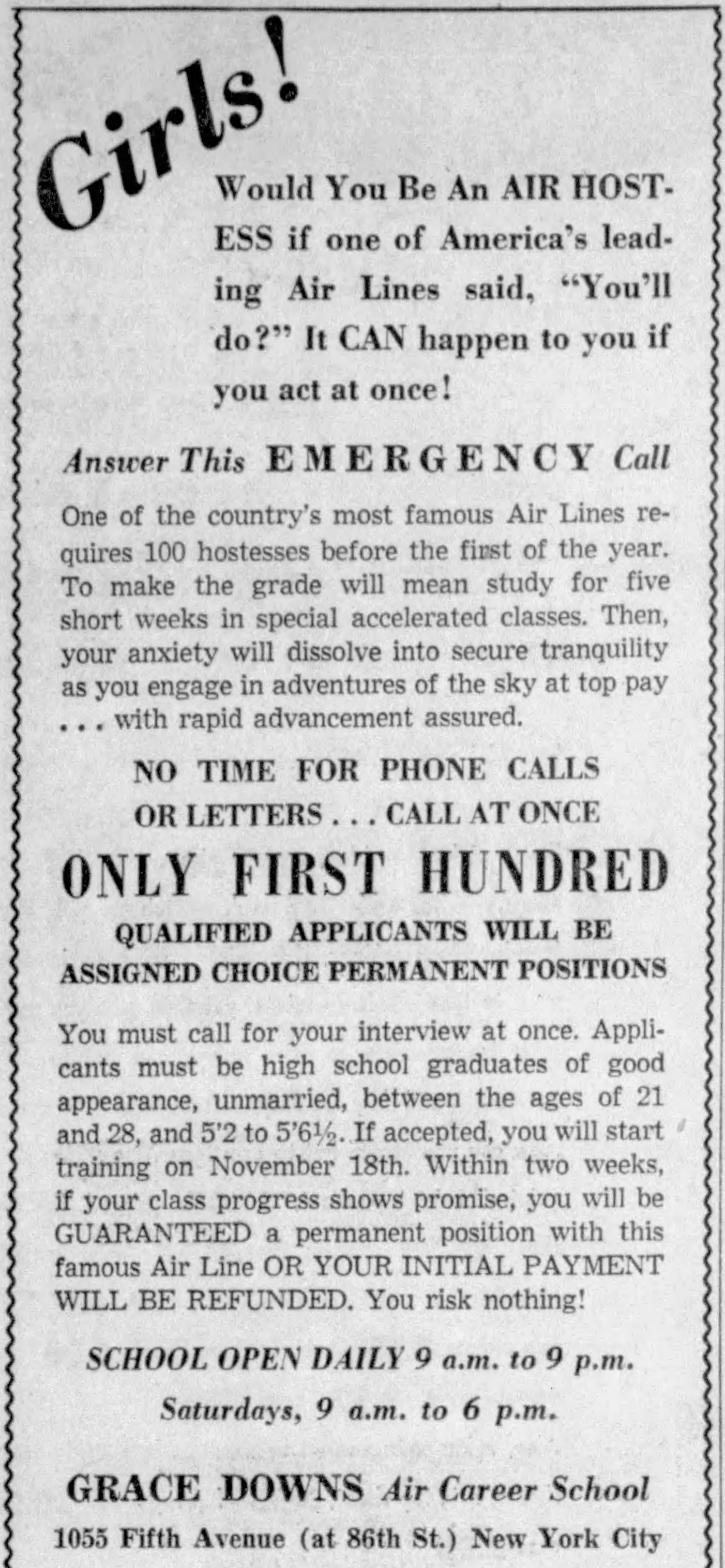
1954 advertisement for Grace Downs Air Career School, which Banks Edmiston would attend two years later.

== Early life and education ==
Patricia Noisette Banks was born in New York City on April 27, 1937 to parents Sadie and Joseph Banks. She graduated from Aquinas High School in 1955. Banks Edmiston attended Queens College for a year to study psychology. While attending Queens College, she read an article about Grace Downs Air Career School. Banks Emiston knew "African-American people didn't have the opportunity to travel that much," and thought it would be a promising opportunity. She applied and was accepted into Grace Downs Air Career School in 1956.

== Career ==
After completing her training to be a stewardess, Banks Edmiston sought employment in various airline companies. However, she encountered consistent rejections, which was not uncommon for Black women in similar positions at the time. She was interviewed by Mohawk Airlines, Trans World Airlines, and Capital Airlines, but was not selected to move forward in the hiring process.

=== Legal complaint ===
During the screening process for Capital Airlines, Banks Edmiston initially received a rating of "B+" from the chief hostess, which the company considered to be "accepted for future employment", but her application was later nullified at the request of the director of passenger service. Banks Edmiston was told by a chief hostess at Capital Airlines that "the company didn't hire black people in flight capacities". At the time, pilots, engineers, and stewardesses were rarely Black.

In 1957, after seeking advice from Adam Clayton Powell Jr., the only Black Congressman from New York at the time, Banks Edmiston decided to take legal action against Capital Airlines. She did so by filing a comprehensive 72-page complaint with the New York State Commission Against Discrimination. The airline, in its defense, contended that the complaint was null and void due to its age, surpassing the 90-day statute of limitations. Furthermore, they claimed that they did not conduct hiring operations in New York. They insisted that they do not discriminate and that the reason they refused to hire Banks Edmiston was not because of her race, but rather because of her lack of experience and "because she had a bad tooth". In response to the airline's arguments, Banks Edmiston brought to the committee's attention that Capital Airline's discrimination was ongoing, negating the expiration of the statute of limitations. She also pointed out that the airline regularly recruits and hires from the Grace Downs School in New York, her alma mater, thereby establishing her qualifications. Lastly, Banks Edmiston argued that Capital Airlines indeed engaged in discrimination, noting "they have 570 employed hostesses and not one is a Negro", a pattern that extended to all 1,350 flight-related employees.

"The historical weight is beautiful, but I think the most important part is that the barrier was broken. I always said it didn't have to be me, but that it was going to be a Black woman."

–Patricia Banks Edmiston

After the three-year legal battle, the Commission ruled in 1960 that the airline had illegally discriminated against Banks Edmiston because of her race and required them to offer her employment. They also ordered Capital Airlines to "cease and desist from maintaining a policy of barring negroes from employment because of their color, in all flight capacities, including that of flight hostess." The case has been called a "hallmark legal proceeding that revolutionized the industry", and is widely credited with leading to the start of other airlines hiring Black women. Her winning of the case resulted in harassment and violent threats at the time, to the point that Edmiston had to seek law enforcement assistance to safeguard her well-being.

In May 1960, four years after first applying to Capital Airlines, Banks Edmiston started her position as a stewardess. She was the first African-American stewardess at the airline. The stress of experiencing racial discrimination while flying in the Southern United States took a toll on Edmiston. This, along with the pressure she felt to maintain a flawless record in order to preserve future prospects for other Black flight attendants, caused Edmiston to resign from Capital Airlines in 1961.

=== After 1961 ===
From 1970 to 1972, Banks Edmiston served as a counselor at New York City's Addicts Rehabilitation Center. Following that, she was a program manager at the New York City Manpower Planning Council. Banks Edmiston assumed a role as a program manager within the New York State Office of Alcohol and Substance Abuse Services in 1974. In 1975 she achieved a Bachelor of Arts degree in psychology through Empire State College.

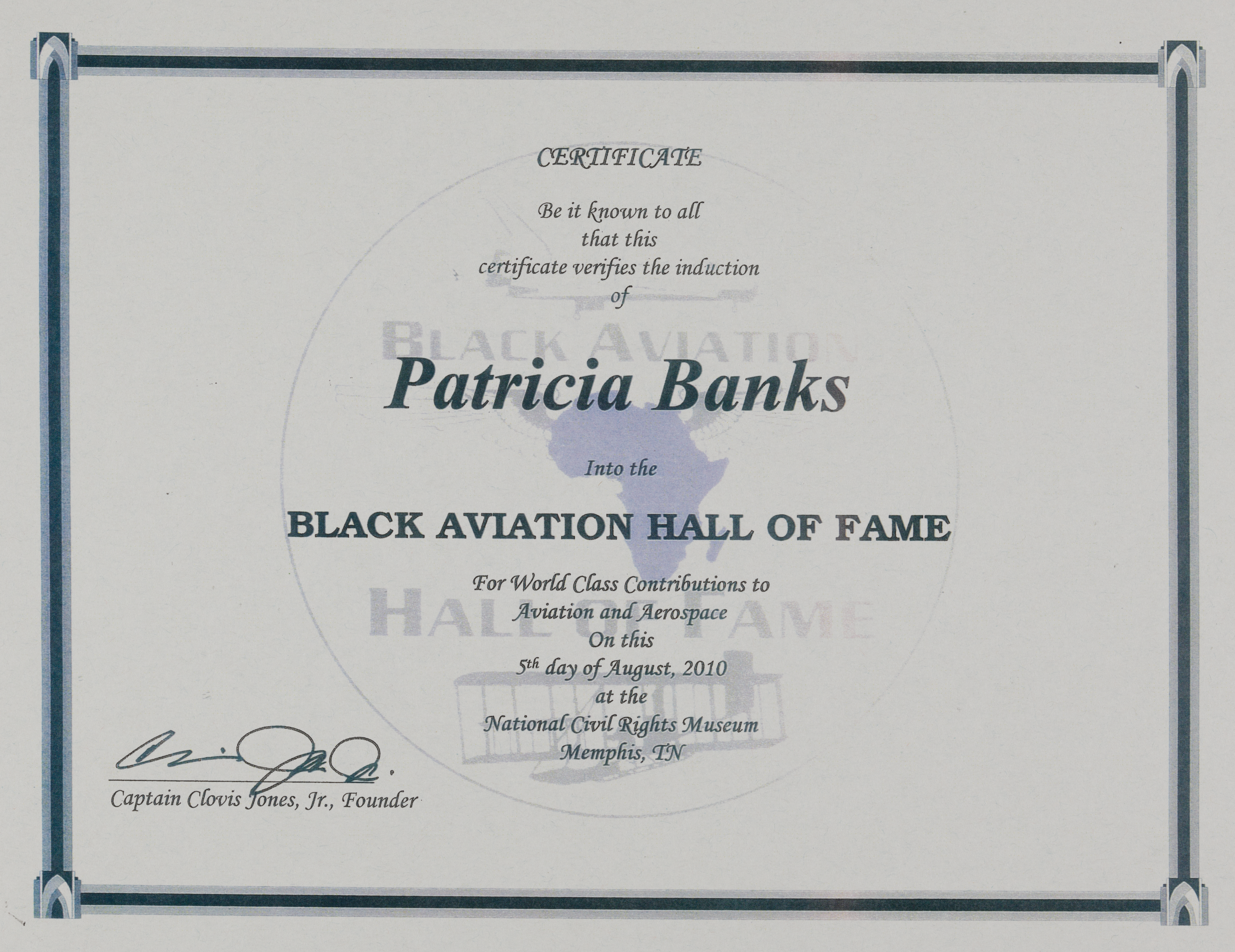
Edmiston's certificate for induction into the Black Aviation Hall of Fame

In 1999, she returned to the Addicts Rehabilitation Center where she acted as a consultant until 2015. Edmiston also dedicated her expertise as a member of the board of directors for the Black Flight Attendants of America. Between 1999 and 2001, Banks Edmiston worked for the American Red Cross as captain of the disaster team. Her professional endeavors also extended to her involvement with American Airlines Medical Wings International from 2000 to 2002. In her personal life, Banks Edmiston has practiced Shotokan, a style of karate in which she holds a black belt.

== Awards ==
On August 5, 2010, Banks Edmiston was inducted into the Black Aviation Hall of Fame at the National Civil Rights Museum for her world class contributions to aviation. She has additionally been honored by the Smithsonian.

== See also ==
- Ruth Carol Taylor, first African-American flight attendant in the United States
