= N66 =

N66 may refer to:

== Roads ==
- N66 road (Ireland)
- Calamba–Pagsanjan Road, in the Philippines
- Nebraska Highway 66, in the United States

== Other uses ==
- N66 (Long Island bus)
- HMS Unity (N66), a submarine of the Royal Navy
- Oneonta Municipal Airport, in Otsego County, New York, United States

== See also ==
- 66N (disambiguation)
