= Robert Peach =

American airline executive (1920–1971)

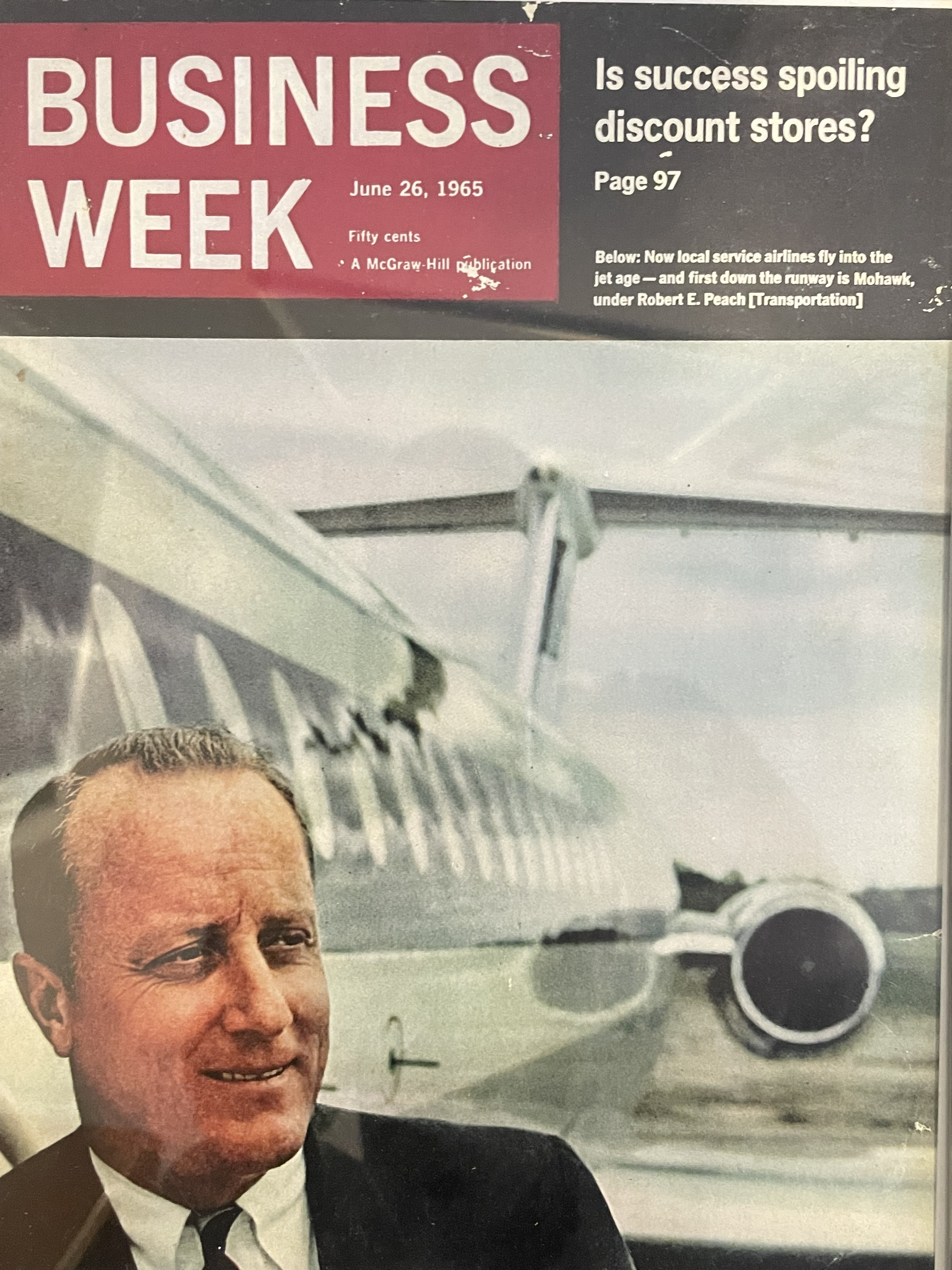
Robert Peach - Mohawk Airlines CEO - Business Week Cover June 1965

Robert English Peach (9 March 1920 – 20 April 1971) was an American airline executive. As founder-president of Mohawk Airlines, he grew Mohawk from an air taxi service to a major regional airline which carried 1.7 million passengers over a network in the northeastern United States in 1969.

== Life ==
Peach was born on 9 March 1920 in Syracuse, New York. He graduated from Hamilton College, in Clinton, New York, in 1941. He enrolled in the University of Chicago Law School in the fall of 1941, but withdrew to enlist in the Navy early in 1942. After pilot training he served with distinction in the Pacific, rising in rank to lieutenant commander, commanding a squadron of aircraft, and earning two Distinguished Flying Crosses and other medals for valor.

In 1945 Peach resumed law studies at Cornell University, and took a part-time pilot position with fledgling Robinson Airlines, then operating two Fairchild F-24s and two Cessna T-50s in scheduled air taxi service between Ithaca and New York. Within a few years Peach was executive vice president and general manager, Robinson had grown in route structure, acquired DC-3 aircraft to handle the increasing passenger load, and changed its name to Mohawk Airlines.

Peach anticipated and drove the expansion of Mohawk, wrestling with the Civil Aeronautics Board, expanding routes, relocating to the Oneida County Airport near Utica, and hiring a consultant in 1953 to evaluate the need for newer, more capable aircraft, a search for which ultimately led to securing three Convair 240 aircraft via Claire Lee Chennault. He continued to drive and expand Mohawk, acquiring new routes and new aircraft, and by the early 1960s Mohawk, having begun as Robinson Airlines with a single four-seat Fairchild F-24, operated a fleet of five Convair 440s, fourteen Martin 404s acquired from Eastern Airlines when Peach took over the Colonial Airlines routes Eastern had acquired in 1956, fourteen Convair 240s, and four DC-3s.

Early in the 1960s Peach advanced toward the acquisition of BAC-111 and FH-227 aircraft to serve Mohawk's routes, as well as corporate, headquarters, maintenance, and training expansions, all of which entailed the necessity of taking on considerable corporate debt for expansion. By 1966 Mohawk had 432 million passenger-miles, reduced federal subsidies from the CAB, and an operating profit of $10.6 million. Peach had led Mohawk to a leadership role amongst regional airlines, and his accomplishment was recognized – in 1964 he was invited to address the Newcomen Society in North America on the history of Mohawk, and in 1965 Syracuse University awarded him the prestigious Salzberg Memorial Medal.

In 1968, however, an economic and financial perfect storm began to form for Mohawk and Peach: On 3 July 1968 PATCO, the Professional Air Traffic Controllers union went on a 'by-the-rule-book' slow-down strike which threw air traffic in the northeast into chaos for months, thus reducing passenger traffic while at the same time sharply increasing Mohawk's costs for fuel, labor, and overtime, and which further combined with a general economic slowdown and airline traffic slowdown for all carriers precisely at the point at which Mohawk was vulnerable from having leveraged to finance expansion and the purchase of new equipment. Financing burdens were now increasing as a percentage of operations, and Peach was eased to the side as the financial storm continued to grow. By 1970 the national economy was in a full-blown recession and the situation at Mohawk, with Peach on the sidelines, was becoming desperate, at which point, feeling threatened by the shifting of less-travelled routes to commuter airlines, Mohawk's pilots began a long and ultimately destructive strike, demanding the right to veto the shifting of routes, which management refused. Within weeks Mohawk was forced to inform creditors it was unable to meet payments, and efforts to restructure financial arrangements began. The pilots' dispute was finally settled after 154 days, with Mohawk facing losses announced 19 March 1971 of a staggering $11.9 million. Management, which had forced Peach to the sidelines, announced a merger with Allegheny Airlines.

On 20 April 1971 Robert Peach was found dead from a self-inflicted gunshot wound, at his home in Clinton, New York, aged fifty-one.

== Sources ==
- Airline Executives and Federal Regulation: Case Studies in American Enterprise from the Airmail Era to the Dawn of the Jet Age, W David Lewis, ed. 2000, Ohio State University Press. ISBN 0-8142-0833-9.
