= Ithaca Tompkins International Airport =

Airport in New York, United States

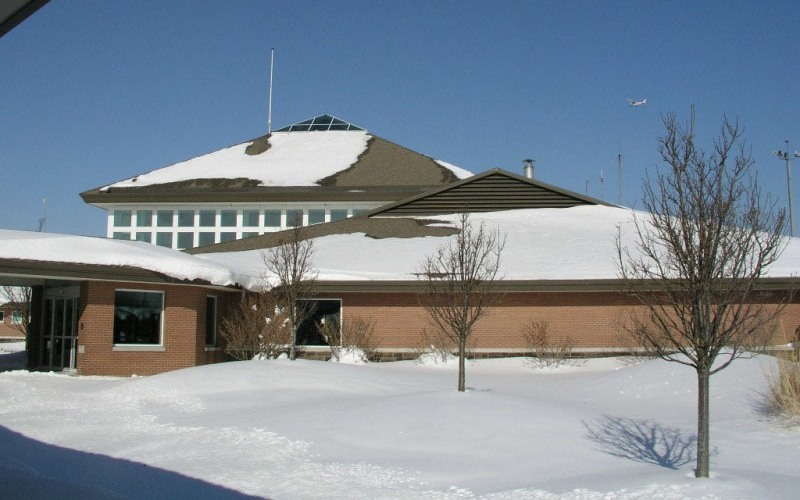
- The front of the airport's terminal in 2009
- IATA: ITH; ICAO: KITH; FAA LID: ITH

Summary
- Airport type: Public
- Owner: Tompkins County
- Serves: Ithaca, New York
- Location: Lansing, New York
- Elevation AMSL: 1,099 ft (335 m)
- Coordinates: 42°29′29″N 076°27′31″W
- Website: www.flyithaca.com

Maps
- FAA airport diagram
- Interactive map of Ithaca Tompkins International Airport

Runways
Direction	Length		Surface
Direction	ft	m	Surface
14/32	6,977	2,127	Asphalt
15/33	2,018	615	Turf

Statistics (2024)
- Total Passengers: 136,000
- Aircraft operations: 27,839
- Based aircraft: 57
- Sources: FAA and airport web site

Ithaca Tompkins International Airport (IATA: ITH, ICAO: KITH, FAA LID: ITH) is a county-owned airport located in the Town of Lansing, three miles northeast of Ithaca, the county seat and only city in Tompkins County, New York. The National Plan of Integrated Airport Systems for 2025–2029 categorized it as a primary commercial service facility. Federal Aviation Administration records say the airport had 60,848 passenger boardings in 2023.

Nonstop scheduled commercial commuter-jet service is available to John F. Kennedy International Airport and Dulles International Airport.

== History ==
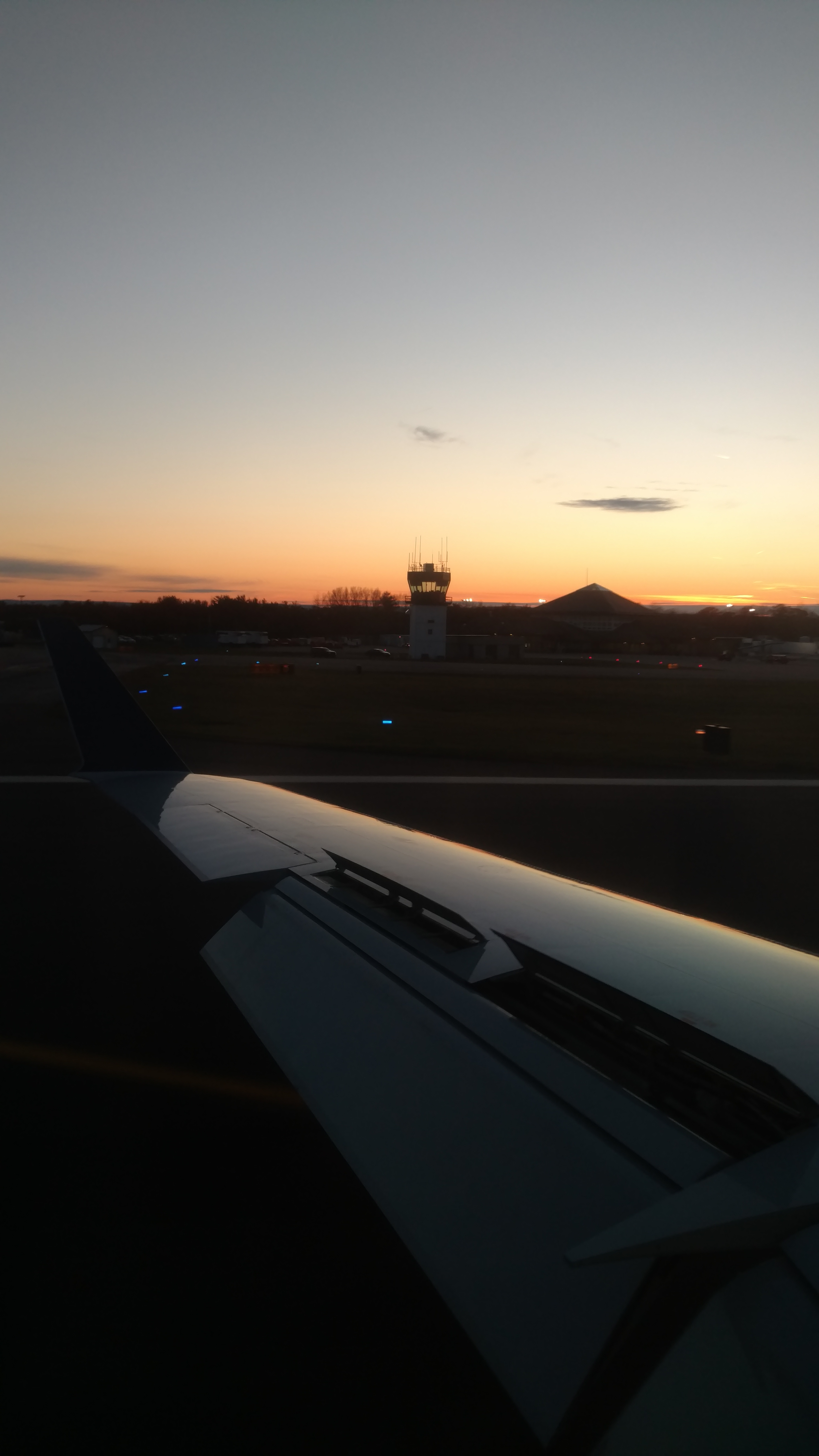
Ithaca Airport tower at sunset

The original Ithaca Municipal Airport was west of downtown Ithaca, near the inlet of Cayuga Lake. The site was identified as a likely flying field in 1914 by pilot Charles Niles, who considered relocating to Ithaca to establish a practice field. In December 1914, the Thomas Brothers Aeroplane Co. relocated to Ithaca and in 1915 established a flying school using the lake and a field near the inlet.

Established prior to 1916, Ithaca Municipal Airport is believed to be the second airport to be established in New York state. The airport initially had two sod runways, but by 1937 it had a 2,700-foot (820 m) north/south asphalt runway and a 2,250-foot (690 m) turf landing strip. The turf runway was no longer in official guidebooks by 1940. Due to its lakeshore location, the airport also provided a dock and anchorage for seaplanes. Bound by the Lehigh Valley Railroad freight yards on the south side, the Cayuga Lake marshes on the north side and fog in the lake valley, the growth potential for the airport was limited. The former airport site is now Cass Park, including a hangar which was renovated in 1975 to house the Hangar Theatre.

In 1946, Cornell University and the city of Ithaca began planning for a new airport on East Hill on the university-owned land in Lansing, New York. East Hill Airport opened in 1948 with Robinson Airlines as its primary tenant. On July 1, 1956, the 23 parcels of land that made up the airport were conveyed by Cornell University to Tompkins County for the sum of $324,500 (equivalent to $3,842,763 in 2025). At that point, East Hill Airport was renamed Tompkins County Airport; it later was renamed Ithaca Tompkins Regional Airport.

The original municipal airport was the base for Aviation pioneer Cecil Robinson's aerial photography missions. In 1945, shortly after the end of World War II, he created Robinson Airlines at the municipal airport before transferring operations to the new East Hill Airport in 1948. Scheduled DC-3 flights to East Hill began in 1948; the airline changed its name to Mohawk Airlines in 1952 and merged with Allegheny Airlines in 1972. Later, the airport was served by Empire Airlines and Air North; the latter became Brockway Air, which merged into Piedmont Airlines. Allegheny, Piedmont and Empire all eventually merged into US Airways, which later merged into American Airlines. Other carriers included Commuter Airlines, Mall Airways, Command Airways (later operating under the name American Eagle), Ransome Airlines (also operating under the name TW Express, United Express) and Continental Express.

Another aviation pioneer, Ruth Carol Taylor, was the first African-American flight attendant in American commercial aviation history. Her first flight was a Mohawk Airlines flight departing Ithaca on February 11, 1958.

=== Expansion ===
In 1994, a new, 33,000 sq ft (3,100 m^{2}), $11-million terminal opened, replacing the cramped original building. Simultaneously, the runway was extended from 5,801 feet (1,768 m) to 6,602 feet (2,012 m); the runway was subsequently extended in 2009 to its present 6,977 feet (2,127 m) as part of a runway-safety extension project that added 375 feet (114 m) of additional takeoff pavement to Runway 14. Runway 32 has an instrument landing system and a medium-intensity approach light system with runway alignment lights. Runway 14 has an instrument approach based on the VOR/DME at the airport. A short turf runway was commissioned parallel to the paved runway, but during the 1980s a north–south turf runway was west of the terminal building, about 1,802 feet (549 m) long and 100 feet (30 m) wide.

Airline traffic peaked in 1990 at 226,813 passengers, but by the end of the decade the small size of the market and proximity to Syracuse Hancock International Airport and other regional airports led Trans World Airlines, United Airlines and finally Continental Airlines to leave.

In 2001, the airport renamed itself the Ithaca Tompkins Regional Airport, replacing its former moniker: the Tompkins County Airport.

In late 2004, after negotiations with the county, Northwest Airlines agreed to add Northwest Airlink service to Detroit Metropolitan Wayne County Airport, which began on May 2, 2005. US Airways nonstops to Pittsburgh, a focus city, resumed on November 9, 2005, but ended on April 1, 2006, due to low yield. Passenger traffic has improved with the additional service; the airport served about 140,000 passengers in 2004, increasing to around 170,000 in 2007. On October 6, 2008, Continental Connection resumed service between Ithaca and Newark Liberty International Airport with four daily flights. In 2011, the airport served 242,493 passengers on three airlines.

In 2009, Regional Elite Airline Services took over ground-handling duties from Mesaba Airlines for the Delta Connection flights to Detroit. As of November, 2012, all ground-handling for Delta and United Airlines was handled by DAL Global Services.

Starting on March 24, 2012, US Airways Express ended all service between Ithaca and New York–LaGuardia as part of a slot-exchange deal with Delta.

The 2013 Federal sequester did not result in the closure of the airport's control tower. The U.S. Department of Transportation restored the funding needed to support the continued operation of the Ithaca airport control tower.

In 2014, Robert Nichols, who had been the airport's general manager since 1990, retired.

On September 12, 2017, the airport announced that it had been awarded $2.4 million in grants from the FAA to rehabilitate the general aviation tarmac, add new perimeter fencing and lighting and build a second passenger boarding bridge. Simultaneously, United Airlines announced that it was upgrading its Ithaca to Newark service from 37-seat Dash 8 turboprop aircraft to 50-seat Embraer ERJ-145 commuter-jet aircraft, meaning that all commercial passenger flights to and from Ithaca would be aboard jet aircraft. On May 3, 2018, New York State Governor Andrew Cuomo announced (at the airport) a new $22 million project to double the size of the 25-year-old airport terminal, adding six new gates, three new jet bridges and a customs facility to allow international air travel to Ithaca, as well as expanded office space for the Transportation Security Administration and the serving airlines. Cuomo returned to Ithaca on October 16, 2018, to help break-ground for the newly renamed "Ithaca-Tompkins International Airport." At groundbreaking, the total cost was expected to be $24.7 million, and the renovated terminal would include a restaurant and bar. The addition was designed by architecture firm C&S Companies.

On July 12, 2018, the airport announced that American Airlines would start nonstop service to Charlotte, North Carolina, with one weekly flight on Saturdays beginning in December, 2018 (operating daily as of March 2022). At the same time, United Airlines announced the cancellation of its service to Newark, replacing it with a nonstop to Washington-Dulles International Airport effective October 4 (canceled on March 2, 2022).

The second phase of construction began in the spring of 2019 and was completed on December 20, 2019. Construction costs had increased to $14.2 million in state funding, $10 million in federal funding and $10.6 million from Tompkins County: $34.8 million.

Due to the COVID-19 pandemic, flights to and from Philadelphia were dropped in September, 2020.

== Facilities ==
The airport covers 531 acres (215 ha) at an elevation of 1,099 feet (335 m). It has two runways: 14/32 is 6,977 by 150 feet (2,127 m × 46 m) asphalt and 15/33 is 2,018 by 50 feet (615 m × 15 m) turf.

In 2011 the airport had 41,286 aircraft operations, average 113 per day: 77% general aviation, 23% air taxi, <1% military, and <1% airline. 57 aircraft were then based at the airport: 77% single-engine, 9% multi-engine, and 14% jet.

United Express uses the one-class Embraer ERJ-145XR between ITH and Washington–Dulles International Airport (IAD). Delta Connection uses the Bombardier CRJ900 between ITH and John F. Kennedy International Airport/JFK.

== Airlines and destinations ==
=== Passenger ===
Airlines	Destinations
Delta Connection	New York–JFK
United Express	Washington–Dulles

Domestic destinations from Ithaca Tompkins International Airport
Red = Year-round destination

== Statistics ==
=== Top destinations ===
Busiest domestic routes from ITH (March 2025 – February 2026)
Rank	Airport	Passengers	Carrier(s)
1	New York-JFK, New York	38,680	Delta
2	Washington-Dulles, Virginia	27,270	United

=== Top airlines ===
Largest airlines at ITH (June 2024 - May 2025)
Rank	Airline	Passengers	Share
1	Endeavor Air	80,250	59.31%
3	CommuteAir	10,530	40.69%

== Ground transportation ==
TCAT Route 32 travels to Cornell University and downtown Ithaca (Ithaca Commons) seven days a week. Several car rental companies have a presence on the airport, and taxis are also available at the terminal.

== See also ==
- List of airports in New York (disambiguation)
