= 66N =

66N may refer to:

- 66°NORTH, a clothing manufacturer in Iceland
- 66th parallel north (Latitude 66°N), a line of latitude close to the Arctic Circle
- Interstate 66N, proposed name of the never-constructed Interstate 266, a road between Washington, D.C. and Arlington County Virginia

== See also ==
- N66 (disambiguation)
