= Piedmont Airlines (1948–1989) =

Airline of the United States (1948–1989)

IATA	ICAO	Call sign
PI	PAI	PIEDMONT
- Founded: January 1, 1948
- Commenced operations: February 20, 1948
- Ceased operations: August 5, 1989 (merged into USAir)
- Hubs: Baltimore; Charlotte
- Secondary hubs: Dayton; Syracuse
- Subsidiaries: Piedmont Regional Airlines
- Parent company: US Airways Group
- Headquarters: One Piedmont Plaza; Winston-Salem, North Carolina, U.S.
- Key people: William R. Howard (CEO)
- Founder: Thomas Henry Davis

Piedmont Airlines was a local service carrier, a scheduled airline in the United States that operated from 1948 until it merged with USAir in 1989. Its headquarters were at One Piedmont Plaza in Winston-Salem, North Carolina, a building that is now part of Wake Forest University.

In April 1989, shortly before it merged into USAir, Piedmont had 22,000 employees. In September 1988 it flew to 95 airports from hubs in the eastern United States; its commuter and regional affiliates flew turboprop aircraft via code sharing agreements to 39 more airports.

== History ==
The company that would become Piedmont Airlines was founded by Thomas Henry Davis (March 15, 1918 – April 22, 1999) in Winston-Salem, North Carolina, in 1940, when Davis purchased Camel City Flying Service and changed the name to Piedmont Aviation. Piedmont originally operated as an airplane repair service and a training school for pilots in the War Department Civilian Pilot Training Program. In 1944, Davis filed an application to run a passenger flight service in the southeast. After several years of lobbying government agencies and fighting legal challenges from other airlines, Piedmont received authorization on January 1, 1948. The first flight, from Wilmington, North Carolina, to Cincinnati, was on February 20, 1948.

Davis grew up in Winston-Salem, North Carolina. As a child, he loved airplanes and often used his allowance to take flying lessons. He took pre-med classes at the University of Arizona. At the same time, he worked as a part-time flight instructor.

=== Foundation ===
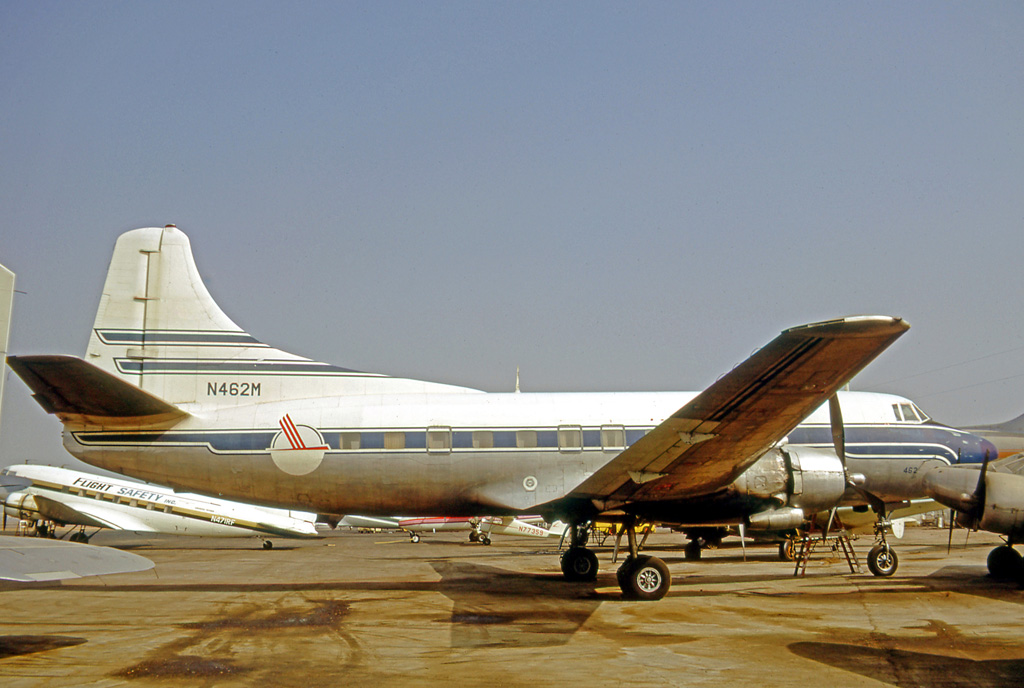
The Martin 4-0-4 was Piedmont's first pressurized airliner.

Like most airlines before deregulation, Piedmont did not have hubs. The airline would eventually fly jets to small airports and connected unlikely city pairs with jet flights: Kinston, North Carolina, and Florence, South Carolina; Roanoke, Virginia, and Asheville, North Carolina; Lynchburg, Virginia, and New York City's LaGuardia Airport; Chicago's O'Hare International Airport and Bristol/Kingsport/Johnson City, Tennessee; and Winston-Salem, North Carolina, to Lynchburg, Virginia.

Its early routes stretched from Wilmington, North Carolina, northwest to Cincinnati, Ohio, with intermediate stops. All flights were on Douglas DC-3s.

=== Growth ===
Revenue passenger traffic, in millions of passenger-miles (scheduled flights only)

Year	Pax-Miles
1951	44
1955	69
1960	94
1965	287
1970	745
1975	1061
1980	2363
1985	8164

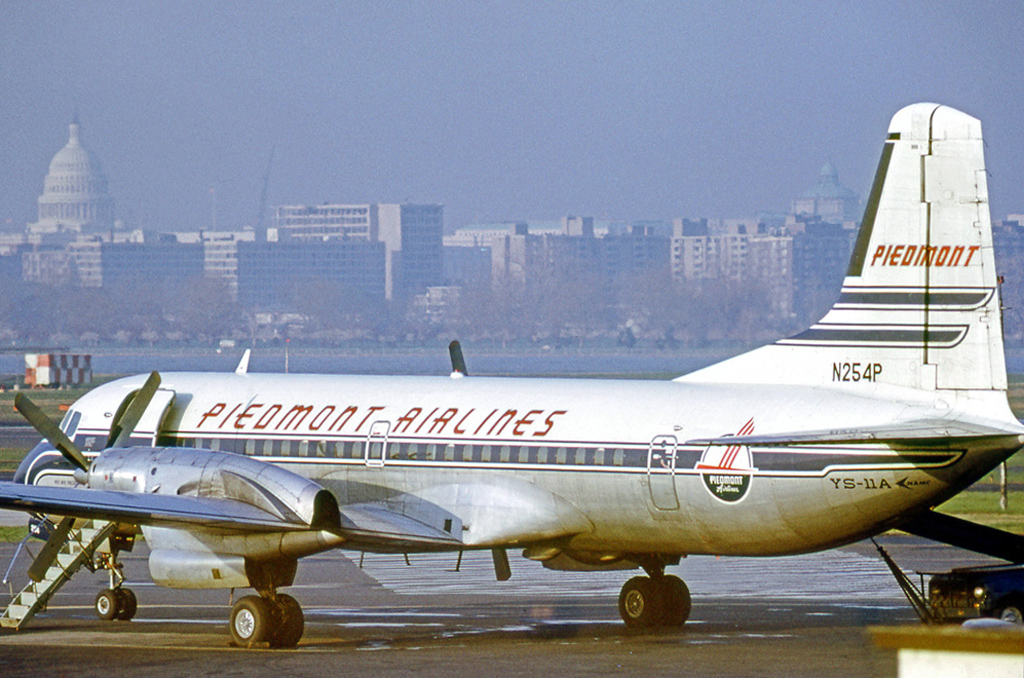
Piedmont NAMC YS-11A at Washington National

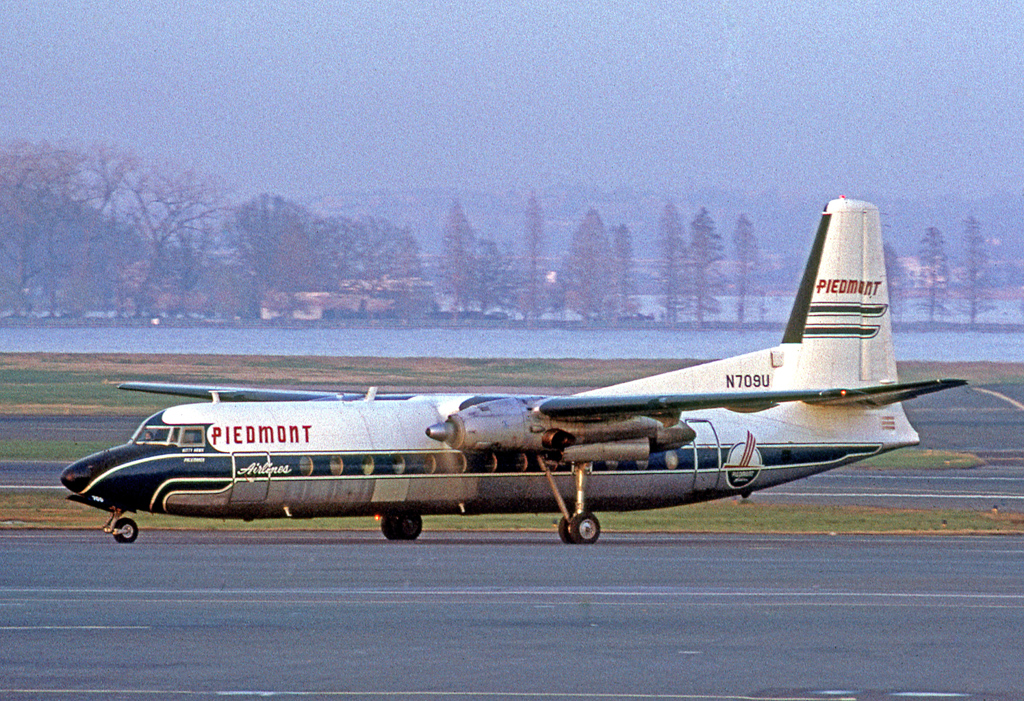
Fairchild-Hiller FH-227B at Washington National in 1972

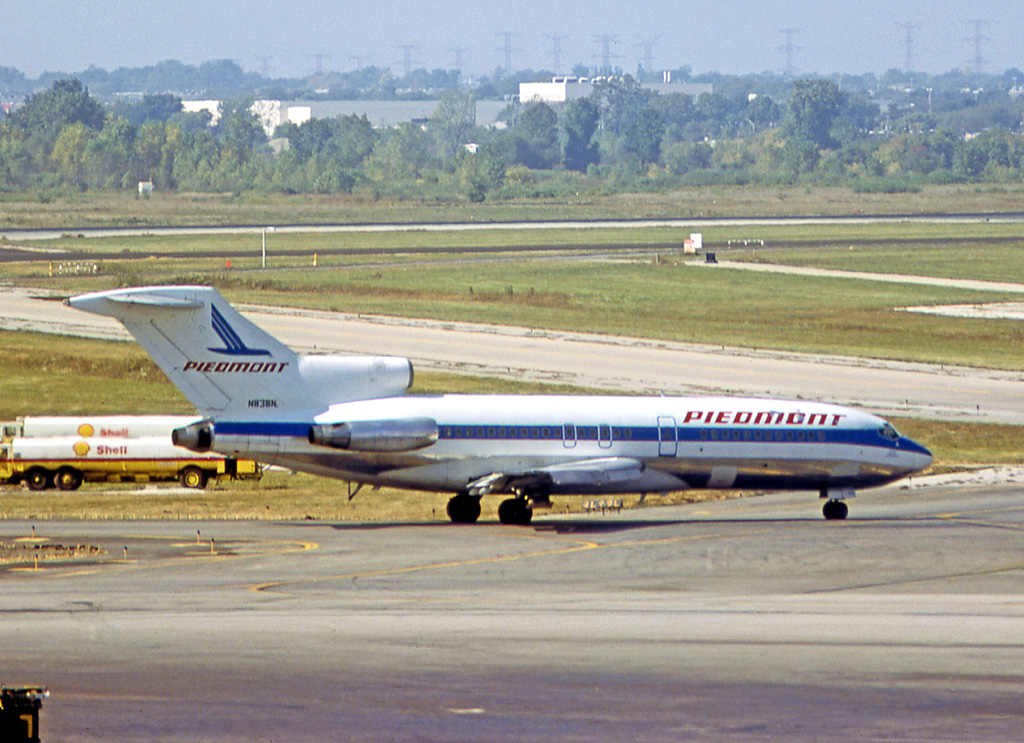
Boeing 727-100 at Chicago O'Hare Airport in 1979

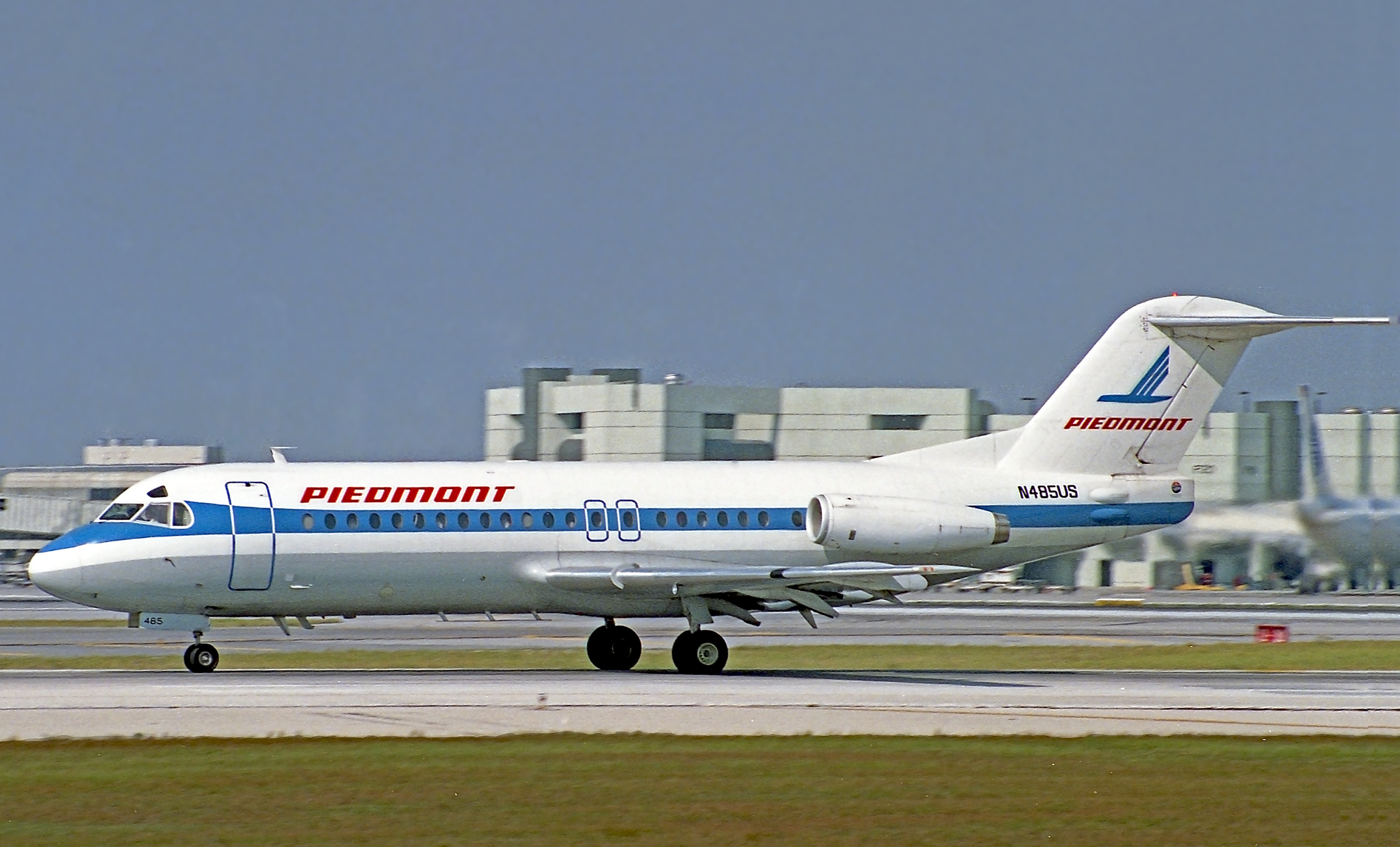
A Fokker F28-4000 at Miami International Airport in October 1988

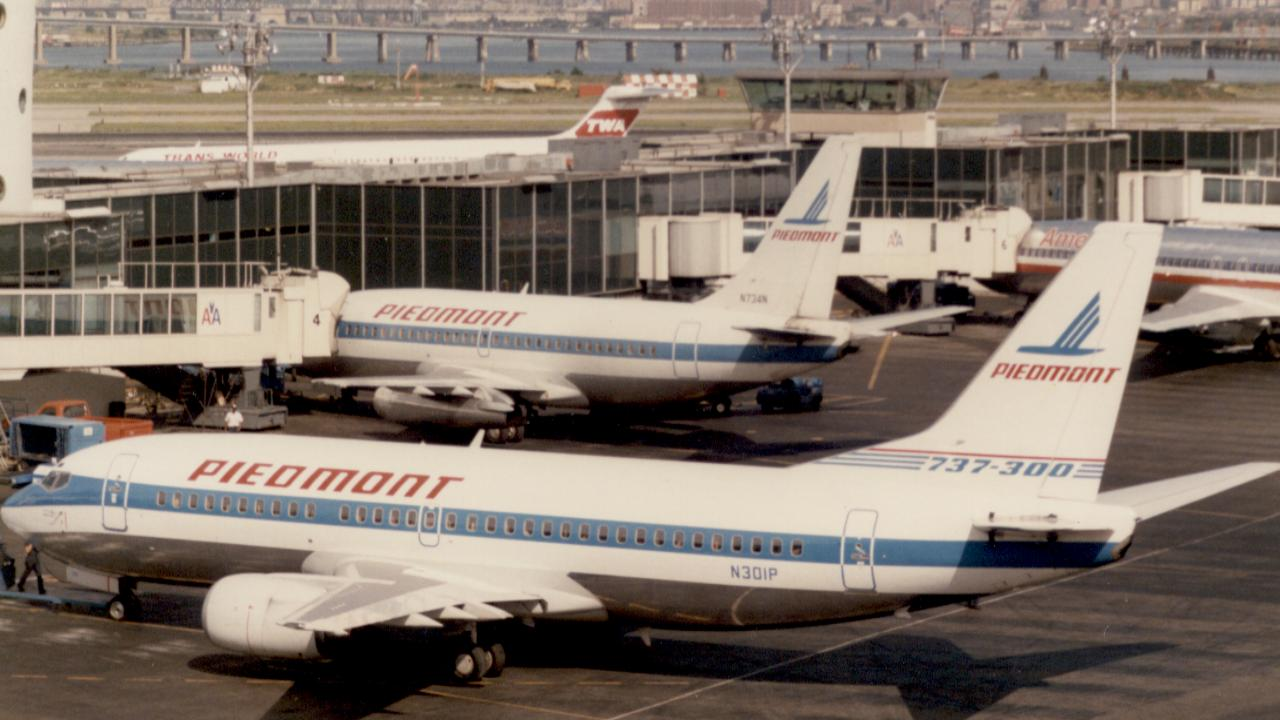
A Boeing 737-200 and a Boeing 737-300 at LaGuardia Airport in August 1985

Piedmont started with Douglas DC-3s; it added Fairchild F-27s in late 1958 and Martin 4-0-4s at the beginning of 1962. FH-227B flights started (and F27 flights ended) in 1967 and NAMC YS-11A flights started in 1968. In August 1953 it scheduled flights to 26 airports and in May 1968 to 47.

Like other Local Service airlines, Piedmont was subsidized; in 1962, its operating "revenues" of $18.2 million included $4.8 million "Pub. serv. rev."

=== The jet age ===
Piedmont's first jet flights took off in March 1967: 92-seat Boeing 727-100s on such routes as Atlanta - Asheville - Winston-Salem - Roanoke - New York LaGuardia Airport. Boeing 737-200s arrived in 1968; six 727-100s were added from 1977, and in June 1981 the airline added the Boeing 727-200. Piedmont's fleet was all-turbine after the last Martin 4-0-4 piston powered flights in 1972 and all-jet after the last NAMC YS-11 turboprop flights in 1982 (one 727-100 that Piedmont bought from Northwest Orient Airlines was the aircraft hijacked by D. B. Cooper). Fokker F28 Fellowship jets were added to the fleet as well as Boeing 737-300s, 737-400s and 767-200ERs.

=== Route expansion ===
In 1949 the network extended from Cincinnati and Louisville east to Norfolk and points south. The map reached Knoxville in 1951–1952, Columbus OH and Washington DC in 1955, Atlanta and Baltimore in 1962, New York La Guardia in 1966, Nashville and Memphis in 1968 and Chicago Midway in December 1969.

In 1978, still under U.S. route regulation, Piedmont added Boston, Denver, and Miami. Flights to Dallas/Ft. Worth and Tampa began in 1979 followed by Houston in January 1980 and New Orleans in 1982. In 1984 Los Angeles and San Francisco were added followed by Minneapolis/St. Paul in 1985, Montreal and Ottawa with the Empire Airlines merger in July 1986, and Seattle, Phoenix and San Diego in 1987. In 1988 the airline was serving a new international destination, Nassau, Bahamas and by 1989 was flying to Bermuda and nonstop between Los Angeles and Baltimore, Charlotte, Dayton, and Tampa; nonstop between San Francisco and Charlotte, Dayton and Kansas City; nonstop between Phoenix and Baltimore and Charlotte; and nonstop between Seattle and Charlotte Shortly before the merger with USAir in 1989, Piedmont had hubs at Baltimore, Charlotte, Dayton and Syracuse. Syracuse was the smallest hub; it had been an Empire hub.

=== Deregulation ===
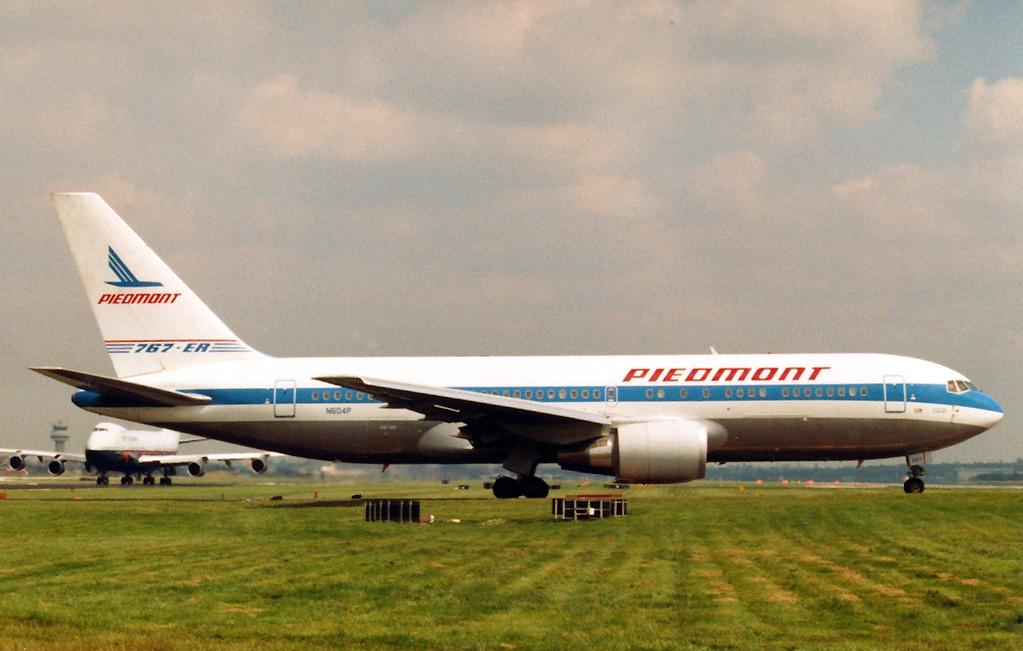
A Boeing 767-200ER at London Gatwick Airport in 1988

After deregulation in the late 1970s the airline grew rapidly and developed a hub at Charlotte/Douglas International Airport in Charlotte, North Carolina. Piedmont bought Empire Airlines, based in Utica, New York, in 1985 which brought more Fokker F28 Fellowships into the fleet. Passenger-miles for the merged airline in 1987 were almost nine times Piedmont's RPMs in 1977.

Later hubs included Baltimore/Washington International Airport; James M. Cox Dayton International Airport in Dayton, Ohio; and Syracuse Hancock International Airport in Syracuse, New York. Non-stop flights from Charlotte to the West Coast began in 1984 on Boeing 727-200s. These were Piedmont's first jets with a first-class section. New Boeing 767-200ERs (ER for "Extended Range"), the airline's only wide-body jet, flew nonstop Charlotte to London Gatwick Airport beginning in 1987. The 767 also flew nonstop Charlotte-Los Angeles. Shortly before it was acquired by USAir, Piedmont was the first airline to announce fleet-wide adoption of the Traffic Collision Avoidance System (TCAS).

=== Commuter and regional airline affiliates ===
Several commuter and regional airline affiliates provided passenger feed for Piedmont via code sharing agreements, including Britt Airways, Brockway Air, CCAir, Henson Airlines and Jetstream International Airlines. These operations were identified by several different names including Piedmont Commuter System, Piedmont Shuttle Link and The Piedmont Regional Airline. Turboprop aircraft operated by these airlines included the Beechcraft 99, Beechcraft 1900C, British Aerospace BAe Jetstream 31, de Havilland Canada DHC-7 Dash 7, de Havilland Canada DHC-8 Dash 8, Fokker F-27-600, Saab 340, Short 330 and Short 360.

=== Absorption into USAir ===
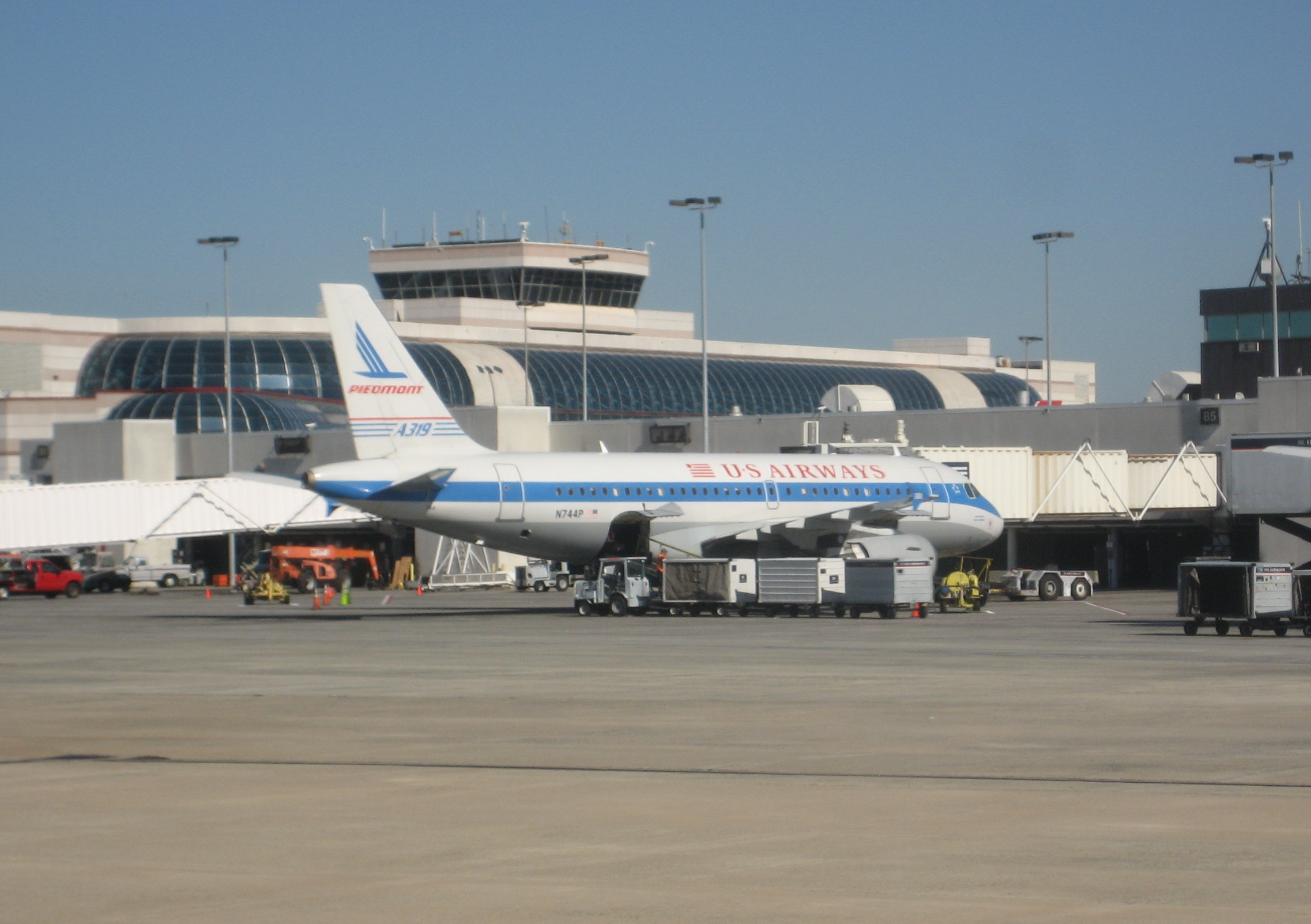
US Airways A319 in a hybrid US Airways/Piedmont "retro" livery

Piedmont's expanding route system, its loyal passenger following, and its profitability caused it to gain notice among other airlines for a potential buyout. On August 5, 1989, Piedmont Airlines was absorbed by USAir (formerly Allegheny Airlines); the combination became one of the East Coast's largest airlines. USAir later changed its name to US Airways, which merged with America West Airlines on November 4, 2007. US Airways merged with American Airlines on October 17, 2015, with the American name being retained. The Charlotte hub established by Piedmont and maintained by US Airways continues under American; it is now American's second-largest hub.

Piedmont Airlines (formerly Henson Airlines) still exists as a brand within American Airlines, doing business as American Eagle.

== Historical fleet ==
- Boeing 727-100
- Boeing 727-200
- Boeing 737-200
- Boeing 737-300
- Boeing 737-400
- Boeing 767-200ER (The 767 enabled Piedmont to operate nonstop flights to London Gatwick Airport)
- Douglas DC-3
- Fairchild F-27
- Fairchild Hiller FH-227
- Fokker F28 Fellowship - (formerly operated by Empire Airlines which was acquired by Piedmont)
- Martin 4-0-4
- NAMC YS-11

== Accidents ==
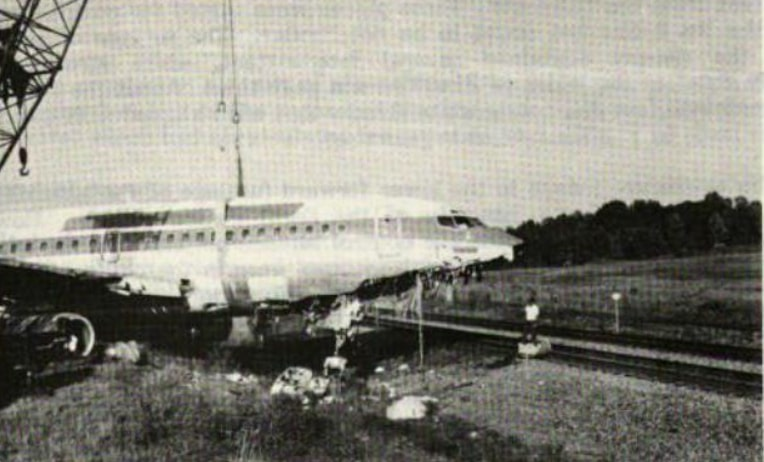
Wreckage of Piedmont Airlines Flight 467 after its crash on October 25, 1986

On October 30, 1959, Piedmont suffered its first crash when Flight 349 slammed into Bucks Elbow Mountain near Charlottesville, Virginia due to a navigational error, whose cause remains in dispute. Twenty-six of the 27 people on board the Douglas DC-3 perished.

On July 19, 1967, Piedmont suffered another fatal accident when Flight 22, a Boeing 727-100, collided with a Cessna 310 over Hendersonville, North Carolina. The National Transportation Safety Board (NTSB) found that the pilot of the Cessna went off course, placing his aircraft in the path of the 727. 82 perished in the mid-air collision.

On August 10, 1968, Piedmont Flight 230 was on an ILS localizer only approach to Charleston-Kanawha County Airport (CRW) runway 23 when it struck trees 360 feet (110 meters) from the runway threshold. The aircraft continued and struck up sloping terrain (+30 degrees) 250 feet (76 meters) short in a 4-5 degree nose-down altitude, slightly left wing down. The Fairchild-Hiller FH-227 continued up the hill and on to the airport, coming to rest 6 feet (1.8 meters) beyond the threshold and 50 feet (15 meters) from the right edge of the runway. A layer of dense fog (about 150 feet (46 meters) thick) was obscuring the threshold and about half of the approach lights. Visual conditions existed outside the fog area. The National Transportation Safety Board (NTSB) found that the probable cause was "an unrecognized loss of altitude orientation during the final portion of an approach into a shallow, dense fog. The disorientation was caused by a rapid reduction in the ground guidance segment available to the pilot at a point beyond which a go-around could not be successfully effected." 35 passengers and crew out of the 37 on board were killed.

== See also ==
- List of defunct airlines of the United States
