= Ruth Carol Taylor =

American flight attendant (1931–2023)

Ruth Carol Taylor (December 27, 1931 – May 12, 2023) was the first African-American flight attendant in the United States. Her first flight was aboard a Mohawk Airlines flight from Ithaca to New York City in 1958.

== Early life ==
Born in Boston, Massachusetts, into a family of Black, White, and Cherokee ancestry, her mother was Ruth Irene Powell Taylor, a nurse, and her father was William Edison Taylor, a barber. When Ruth was young, her family moved to a farm in upstate New York.

Taylor attended Elmira College and graduated as a registered nurse from the Bellevue School of Nursing in New York City.

== Career ==
Hired in December 1957, on February 11, 1958, Taylor was the flight attendant on a Mohawk Airlines flight from Ithaca to New York, the first time such a position had been held by an African American. She was let go within six months as a result of Mohawk's then-common marriage ban.

Taylor was later significantly involved in covering the 1963 March on Washington and as an activist for consumer affairs and women's rights. She wrote The Little Black Book: Black Male Survival in America (1985), whose purpose is to "save lives - the lives of Black African Males who are on the Endangered list" in view of the endemic racism in the United States towards African-Americans.

In 2008, 50 years after her historic flight, her accomplishments were formally recognized by the New York State Assembly.

== Death ==
Taylor died on May 12, 2023, at the age of 91.

== See also ==
- Patricia Banks Edmiston
