= Oneida County Airport =

Airport in New York, U.S.

- IATA: UCA; ICAO: KUCA; FAA LID: UCA

Summary
- Airport type: Public
- Owner: Oneida County
- Serves: Utica, Rome
- Location: Whitestown, New York, U.S.
- Closed: 2007; 19 years ago
- Elevation AMSL: 742 ft / 226 m
- Coordinates: 43°08′36″N 075°22′48″W

Maps
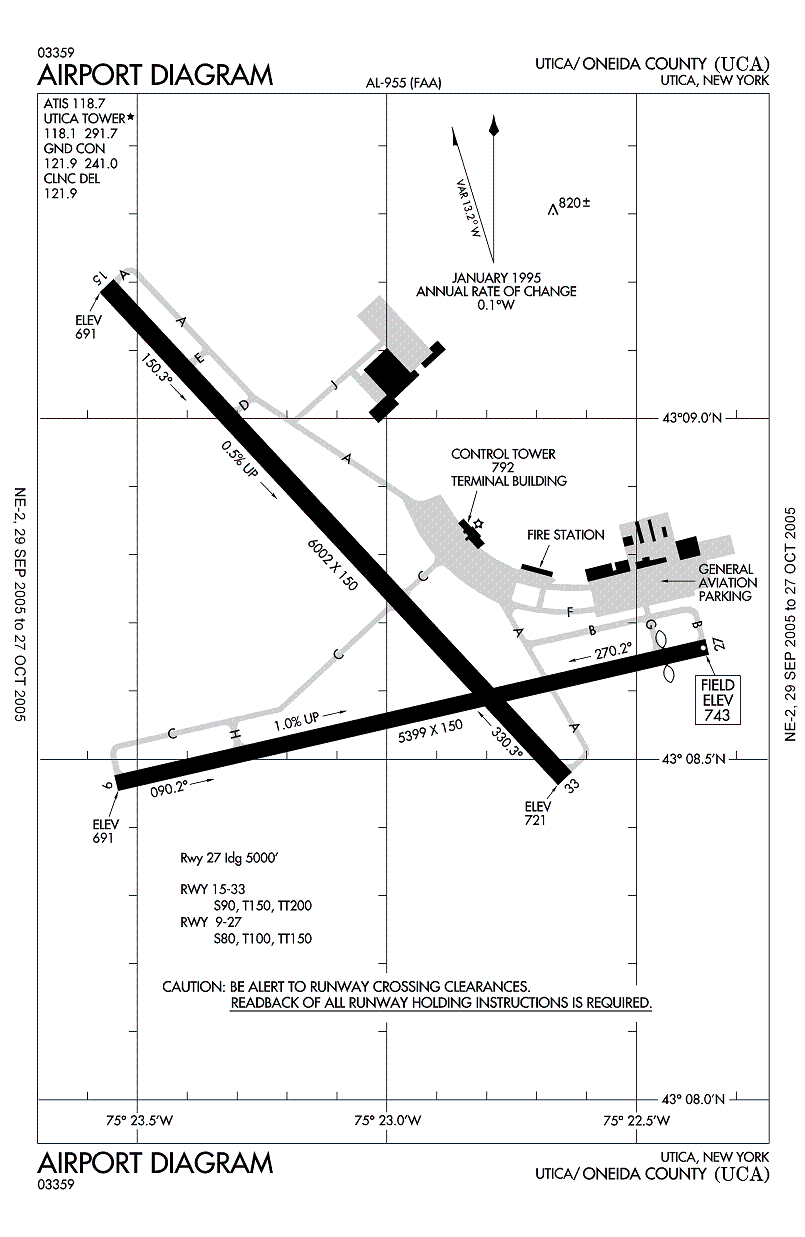
- FAA airport diagram
- Interactive map of Oneida County Airport

Runways
Direction	Length		Surface
Direction	ft	m	Surface
9/27	5,399	1,646	Asphalt
15/33	6,002	1,829	Asphalt
- Source: Federal Aviation Administration

Oneida County Airport (IATA: UCA, ICAO: KUCA, FAA LID: UCA) was a public airport in Whitestown in Oneida County, New York, six miles (10 km) northwest of downtown Utica. The airport covered 1,800 acres (2.8 sq mi; 7.3 km^{2}) and had two runways.

Oneida County closed the airport in January 2007 and transferred operations about five miles (8 km) to the north to Griffiss International Airport, (formerly Griffiss Air Force Base) in Rome.

Federal Aviation Administration records say the airport boarded 2,122 passengers in calendar year 2004 and 1,951 in 2005. The FAA's National Plan of Integrated Airport Systems for 2007–2011 classified it as a general aviation airport.

== History ==
In the 1940s, Utica Municipal Airport was a sod field (no paved runways) at 43.171°N 75.314°W; Oneida County Airport may not have opened until after 1950.

In the 1950s and 1960s, Mohawk Airlines served Utica and built a small hub there. Mohawk merged into Allegheny Airlines in 1972 and service continued through the 1970s. Empire Airlines was based at UCA and served the airport from 1975 through 1986 when they had merged into Piedmont Airlines which in turn merged into USAir (the renamed Allegheny Airlines) in 1989. USAir had a presence at UCA until 1995 when it ended jet flights and closed its maintenance base and reservations center.

The first jets were Mohawk BAC One-Elevens in 1965. Allegheny used Douglas DC-9s and BAC One-Elevens until early 1979 when it abandoned the market to Empire. Empire would return jet service with the Fokker F-28 Fellowship in the 1980's which went on to be used by Piedmont and USAir.

UCA had no airline service after Continental Connection carrier CommutAir left on June 30, 2002. In its final years, UCA flights had been under the EAS program; declining ridership led the required subsidy to breach the $200 per passenger statutory cap.

Service shifted to nearby Griffiss International Airport when Oneida closed in 2007.

The former airport site was purchased from the county by the state and is now the home of the New York State Preparedness Training Center (SPTC).
