= Oneonta Municipal Airport =

- IATA: ONH; ICAO: none; FAA LID: N66

Summary
- Airport type: Public
- Owner: City of Oneonta
- Serves: Oneonta, New York
- Elevation AMSL: 1,763 ft / 537 m
- Coordinates: 42°31′29″N 075°03′52″W
- Interactive map of Oneonta Municipal Airport

Runways
Direction	Length		Surface
Direction	ft	m	Surface
6/24	4,200	1,280	Asphalt

Statistics (2008)
- Aircraft operations: 21,600
- Based aircraft: 9
- Source: Federal Aviation Administration

Oneonta Municipal Airport (IATA: ONH, FAA LID: N66) is a public use airport located three nautical miles (6 km) north of the central business district of Oneonta, a city in Otsego County, New York, United States. The airport is owned by the City of Oneonta. It once had scheduled air service on Mohawk Airlines, formerly known as Catskill Airways.

== Facilities and aircraft ==
Oneonta Municipal Airport covers an area of 310 acres (130 ha) at an elevation of 1,763 feet (537 m) above mean sea level. It has one runway designated 6/24 with an asphalt surface measuring 4,200 by 75 feet (1,280 x 23 m).

For the 12-month period ending February 21, 2008, the airport had 21,600 aircraft operations, an average of 59 per day: 86% general aviation, 14% air taxi, and <1% military. At that time there were 9 aircraft based at this airport: 67% single-engine, 22% multi-engine and 11% helicopter.

== See also ==
- List of airports in New York
