= Brockway Air =

Vermont-based US regional airline (1960–1989)

- Commenced operations: 1960; 66 years ago
- Ceased operations: 1989; 37 years ago
- Operating bases: Burlington, Vermont

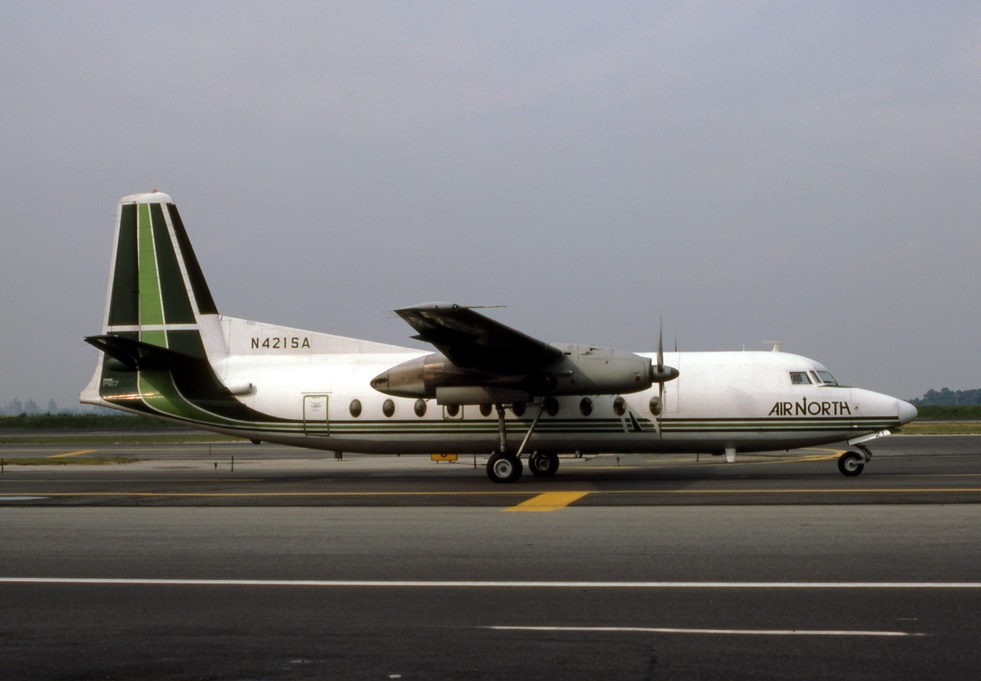
Air North F-27 LaGuardia 1984

Brockway Air was a regional airline in the United States, which was formerly known as Air North and originally as Northern Airways.

== History ==
Headquartered in Burlington, Vermont, the airline began operating in the late 1960s under a marketing relationship with Mohawk Airlines, replacing or supplementing Mohawk's service at small communities in northern New York state and New England. These services connected Boston, Albany, New York and Syracuse, New York with Worcester, Massachusetts, Keene, New Hampshire, Burlington and Rutland in Vermont and the northern New York state cities of Plattsburgh, Saranac Lake, Massena, Ogdensburg and Watertown. Northern Airways' initial fleet consisted of the deHavilland Canada DHC-6 Twin Otter STOL (short take off and landing) capable commuter turboprop airliner.

Following the acquisition of Mohawk Airlines by Allegheny Airlines in April 1972, Air North (the name that Northern Airways was then operating under) became an Allegheny Commuter air carrier, operating code sharing services for Allegheny Airlines connecting northern cities in New York state along with Burlington and Rutland in Vermont to larger airports at Syracuse, NY and Albany, NY.

Air North ended its Allegheny Commuter relationship in 1979 and expanded service in New York state and New England into the early 1980s. The airline's fleet was also expanded with the addition in 1979 of 30-seat Short 330 commuter airliners. These larger turboprop aircraft joined the Air North fleet shortly before the 1980 Winter Olympics held at Lake Placid, New York near Air North's service point of Saranac Lake.

Further fleet growth came in 1980 when Air North became an operator of the Grumman Gulfstream I-C (G-159C) regional airliner, a 37-seat stretched version of the Grumman Gulfstream I turboprop executive aircraft. Powered by Rolls-Royce Dart engines, the Grumman I-C was used by Air North on routes requiring greater speed and passenger capacity than was possible with the airline's Shorts 330s. Air North was one of the very few airlines to ever operate the Gulfstream I-C propjet in scheduled passenger service.

In April 1982 Air North acquired three Fokker F.27-600 airliners that had previously been operated in California by the defunct Swift Aire Lines which had acquired these turboprop aircraft new from the manufacturer. Air North adopted Swift Aire's green and white livery design and added the Fokkers' 48-seat capacity to the airline's expanding route network that by then included New York City, Philadelphia and Washington along with a connecting hub at Binghamton, NY.

During 1982 the Brockway Glass Co. of Brockway, Pennsylvania expanded its aviation holdings and engineered a dual acquisition of Air North and Clinton Aero, a regional airline headquartered in Plattsburgh, New York. Clinton Aero had been formed to operate to several small cities in northern New York state, replacing service previously provided by Air North. Brockway Glass was also the owner of Crown Airways, an Allegheny Commuter airline headquartered at DuBois, Pennsylvania. The combination of Air North and Clinton Aero took place on October 1, 1984, and the new airline began operations as Brockway Air with the fleet receiving Brockway blue and tan liveries.

The Clinton Aero fleet had included the Beechcraft 1900 19-seat regional airliner and additional orders for the B1900 turboprop were made by the new Brockway Air. By 1985, the fleet had been rationalized around the F.27 and the B1900 and service was further expanded through growth of the Binghamton hub (30 weekday flights by September 1985) and the addition of flights between key northeast markets such as Buffalo-Washington, Syracuse-Newark and Burlington-Boston.

As Brockway Air expanded, the airline was increasingly in competition with larger airlines operating in the northeast region. These included US Air and Empire Airlines, both with route networks heavily focused on the New York state and Northeast markets that Brockway served. The 1986 acquisition of Empire Airlines by Piedmont Airlines, and Piedmont's decision to expand the connecting hub complex that Empire had built at Syracuse signaled the closing of Brockway Air's operations as an independent airline.

With Piedmont's new presence in the northeast, Brockway Air opted to join the Piedmont Commuter network in the spring of 1986. This move brought a realignment of Brockway's routes to better feed connecting passengers to Piedmont at Syracuse and other large northeast airports and brought Brockway the marketing advantages that major airline affiliation offered.

The affiliation with Piedmont Airlines was to last for three years. In early 1987, Piedmont accepted a purchase offer from US Air and Piedmont became fully integrated into US Air during August 1989. Brockway Air's ownership was also to change as Brockway Glass was acquired by Owens-Illinois and the Brockway Air subsidiary was placed for sale, attracting the interest of Metro Airlines of Texas. Metro Airlines had embraced code-sharing with major airlines as a growth strategy during the 1980s and had significant operations as an American Eagle carrier on behalf of American Airlines with a hub located at the Dallas/Fort Worth Airport (DFW) in Texas via its wholly owned Metroflight division as well as operating a subsidiary under contract to Eastern Airlines as Eastern Metro Express with a hub located at the Atlanta Hartsfield International Airport (ATL).

The airline holding company which controlled Metro Airlines and Metroflight purchased Brockway Air in the summer of 1989 and changed Brockway's name to Metro Air Northeast. That move coincided with a new codeshare relationship with Trans World Airlines (TWA) under the TWExpress banner and the airline's routes were once again realigned to better feed passenger traffic to TWA at New York's Kennedy International Airport and at Boston.

== Destinations ==
Destination information includes cities previously served by Air North and is compiled from various Air North and Brockway Air system timetable route maps which are referenced below.

- Massachusetts
  - Boston (Logan International Airport)
  - Martha's Vineyard (Martha's Vineyard Airport)
  - Nantucket (Nantucket Memorial Airport)
- New York
  - Albany (Albany International Airport)
  - Binghamton (Greater Binghamton Airport)
  - Buffalo (Buffalo Niagara International Airport)
  - Elmira/Corning (Elmira/Corning Regional Airport)
  - Glens Falls (Floyd Bennett Memorial Airport)*
  - Ithaca (Ithaca Tompkins Regional Airport
  - Massena (Massena International Airport)
  - New York City (LaGuardia Airport)
  - Ogdensburg (Ogdensburg International Airport)
  - Plattsburgh (Clinton County Airport)*
  - Poughkeepsie (Dutchess County Airport)*
  - Rochester (Greater Rochester International Airport)
  - Saranac Lake (Adirondack Regional Airport)
  - Syracuse (Syracuse Hancock International Airport)
  - Watertown (Watertown International Airport)
  - White Plains (Westchester County Airport)
- New Jersey
  - Newark (Newark Liberty International Airport)
  - Atlantic City (Atlantic City International Airport)
- Pennsylvania
  - Philadelphia (Philadelphia International Airport)
  - Wilkes-Barre/Scranton (Wilkes-Barre Scranton International Airport)
- Vermont
  - Burlington (Burlington International Airport)
  - Rutland (Rutland Southern Vermont Regional Airport)
- Virginia
  - Washington, D.C. (Reagan National Airport)

Those airports marked with an asterisk (*) are no longer served by scheduled commercial airline flights.

== Historical fleet ==
- Beechcraft 1900C
- de Havilland Canada DHC-6 Twin Otter
- Fokker F.27-600 Friendship
- Grumman Gulfstream I-C (G-159C)
- Short 330
- Saab 340

== See also ==
- List of defunct airlines of the United States
