= Mohawk Airlines =

U.S. airline (1945–1972)

Mohawk Airlines Incorporated
IATA	ICAO	Call sign
MO	MOW	MOHAWK
- Founded: 1945 (as Robinson Airlines)
- Commenced operations: September 1952 (as Mohawk Airlines)
- Ceased operations: April 12, 1972 (merged into Allegheny Airlines)
- Hubs: Oneida County Airport
- Fleet size: See fleet About 42 aircraft in service at acquisition by Allegheny Airlines in 1972
- Destinations: Albany, Buffalo, Binghamton, Erie, Glens Falls, Ithaca, New York, Newark, Hartford, Harrisburg, Montreal, Rochester, Syracuse, Toronto, Utica, Washington
- Headquarters: Ithaca, New York (1945–1952); Utica, New York (1958–1972)
- Key people: Cecil Robinson; Robert Peach
- Employees: 2,200

Postcard showing the 1960s BAC 1-11 livery

Postcard showing the 1970s BAC 1-11 livery

Mohawk Airlines was a local service carrier operating in the Mid-Atlantic region of the United States, mainly in New York and Pennsylvania, from the mid-1940s until its acquisition by Allegheny Airlines in 1972. At its height, it employed over 2,200 personnel and pioneered several aspects of regional airline operations, including being the first airline in the United States to hire an African American flight attendant, in 1958. The airline was based at Ithaca Municipal Airport near Ithaca, New York, until 1958, when it moved to Oneida County Airport in Whitestown, New York.

== History ==
The airline was founded in 1945 as Robinson Airlines by aerial photographer C. S. Robinson as a unit of Robinson Aviation, completing its first passenger flight on 6 April. The operation was based out of Ithaca Municipal Airport near Ithaca, New York, flying single-engine, three-passenger Fairchild F-24s. After the end of World War II, the Fairchilds were supplemented with two Cessna T-50s, and in 1946, the entire fleet was replaced with Beechcraft Model 18s.

To keep the airline flying, Robinson secured investments from a variety of local sources, notably Ithaca Enterprises, a nonprofit organization responsible for bringing new businesses to Ithaca, and the Cooperative Grange League Federation Exchange (now part of Agway), a farmers cooperative that had been organized by members of The Grange, and Cornell University. Most significant was the involvement of Edwin Albert Link, creator of the Link Trainer. Link lent the airline $75,000 to purchase three used Douglas DC-3s— but also removed control of the company from Robinson, making pilot Robert Peach its general manager. In 1948, the Civil Aeronautics Board certified the airline as a local service carrier, awarding a variety of routes in the Mohawk Valley region. The airline adopted the slogan Route of the Air Chiefs, and painted a blue and red "air chief" on the tails of its planes.

In 1952, Peach purchased a controlling share of the airline, and Robinson removed himself from day-to-day operations. The board adopted the name Mohawk Airlines; in 1953 it carried 2 million passengers between 15 airports and had revenue of $24.3 million. The following summer it experimented briefly with helicopter service, connecting Newark, New Jersey, and Grossinger's Resort in the Catskill Mountains with a Sikorsky S-55. (The July 1954 OAG shows 13 flights a week each way between Newark and Liberty Airport 41.80°N 74.70°W; fare $18 one way plus tax.) More successfully, the airline introduced Convair 240s on 1 July 1955, becoming the first local service carrier with pressurized aircraft. In 1956, having outgrown its facilities in Ithaca, it moved its corporate offices to Utica.

When hired by Mohawk Airlines in December 1957, Ruth Carol Taylor became the first African-American flight attendant in the United States. Six months after breaking one historic barrier, Taylor's career ended due to another barrier: the airline's marriage ban, a common practice among airlines of the day. Airlines often dismissed flight attendants who married or became pregnant.

Mohawk's golden age was the late 1950s and early 1960s; it acquired the Convair 440 in 1958, and Martin 4-0-4s in 1960. In 1961, Mohawk was the first airline to use a centralized computer-based reservation service, and in 1965, the first regional airline to use flight simulators.

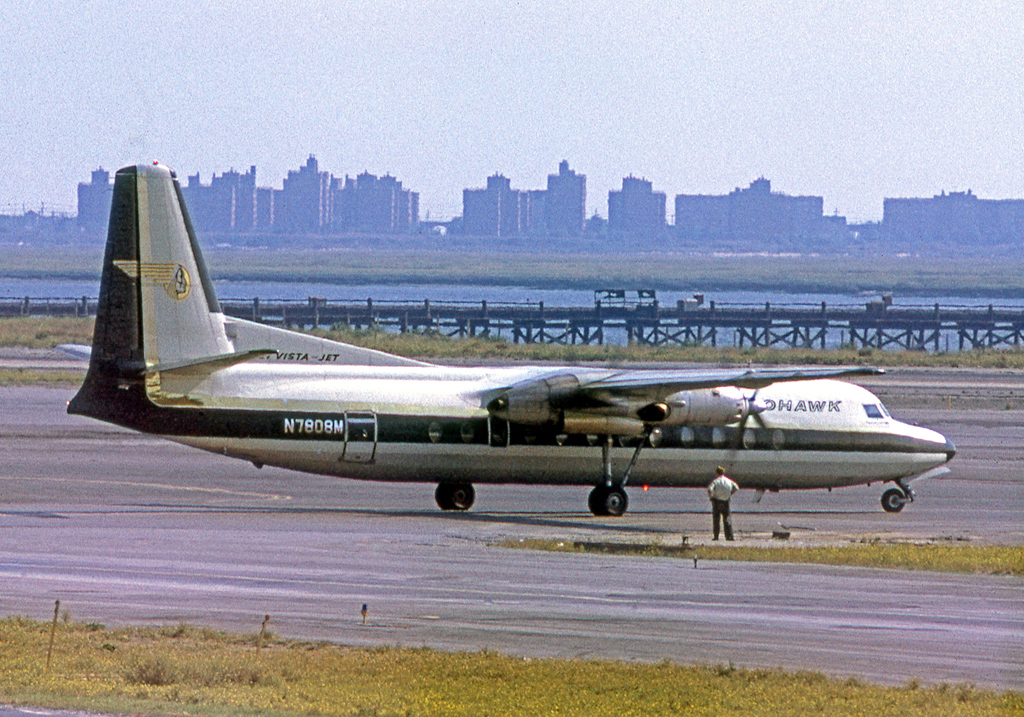
Fairchild Hiller FH-227 at New York-JFK in September 1970

The last DC-3 flights were in 1962; Mohawk ended Convair piston flights in 1969 and mainly flew the BAC One-Eleven and the Fairchild Hiller FH-227 turboprop. Like other local service airlines, Mohawk was subsidized; in 1962 operating "revenues" totaled $23.3 million including $4.6 million "federal subsidy".

In May 1968, Mohawk served 38 airports, from Boston and Washington, D.C., to Detroit. Between 1968 and 1971, labor and economic issues bled Mohawk financially. Unable to pay creditors at the end of that period, Mohawk began merger discussions with Allegheny Airlines, and merged into Allegheny on 12 April 1972. Allegheny changed its name to USAir in 1979, and later to US Airways. Following bankruptcies and a later merger with America West Airlines in 2005, US Airways purchased American Airlines in 2015 and assumed operations under the American Airlines name and logo.

== Destinations ==
- Connecticut
  - Hartford (Bradley International Airport)
- Illinois
  - Chicago (Chicago Midway Airport)
- Massachusetts
  - Bedford (Hanscom Field)*
  - Boston (Logan International Airport)
  - Martha's Vineyard (Martha's Vineyard Airport)
  - Nantucket (Nantucket Memorial Airport)
  - Worcester (Worcester Regional Airport)
- Michigan
  - Detroit (Detroit Metropolitan Wayne County Airport)
- Minnesota
  - Minneapolis-St. Paul (Minneapolis-St. Paul International Airport)

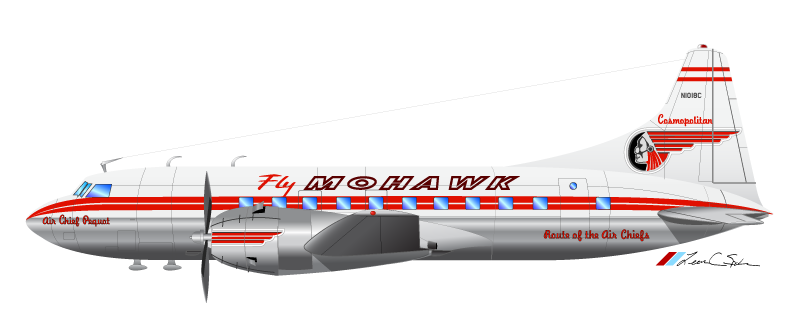
Convair CV-240 "Air Chief Pasquat" circa 1959

- New Hampshire
  - Keene (Dillant–Hopkins Airport)*
  - Lebanon (Lebanon Municipal Airport)
  - Manchester (Grenier Field)
- New Jersey
  - Atlantic City (Atlantic City International Airport)
  - Newark (Newark International Airport)
- New York
  - Albany (Albany International Airport)
  - Alexandria Bay (Maxson Airfield)*
  - Binghamton (Greater Binghamton Airport)
  - Buffalo (Buffalo Niagara International Airport)
  - Elmira/Corning (Elmira-Corning Regional Airport)
  - Glens Falls (Floyd Bennett Memorial Airport)*
  - Islip (Long Island MacArthur Airport)
  - Ithaca/Cortland (Ithaca Tompkins International Airport)
  - Jamestown (Chautauqua County-Jamestown Airport)
  - Massena (Massena International Airport)
  - New York (John F. Kennedy International Airport)
  - Oneonta/Cooperstown (Oneonta Municipal Airport)*
  - Plattsburgh (Clinton County Airport)
  - Poughkeepsie (Dutchess County Airport)*
  - Rochester (Greater Rochester International Airport)
  - Utica/Rome (Oneida County Airport)*
  - Saranac Lake (Adirondack Regional Airport)
  - Syracuse (Syracuse Hancock International Airport)
  - Watertown (Watertown International Airport)
  - White Plains (Westchester County Airport)

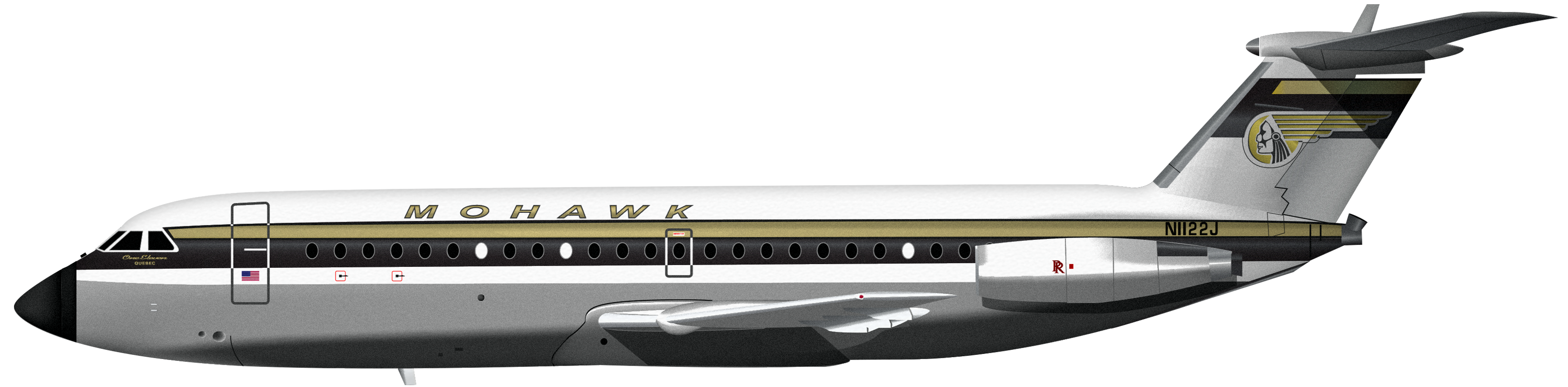
BAC 1-11 "Quebec" circa 1972

- Ohio
  - Cleveland (Cleveland Hopkins International Airport)
- Ontario, Canada
  - Toronto (Toronto Pearson International Airport)
- Pennsylvania
  - Erie (Erie International Airport)
  - Philadelphia (Philadelphia International Airport)
  - Pittsburgh (Pittsburgh International Airport)

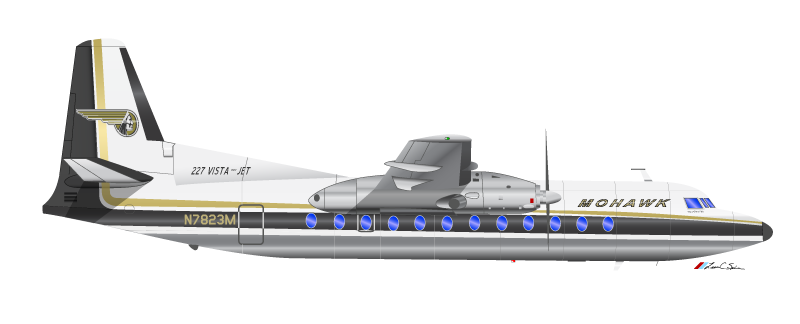
FH-227B "The City of Glens Falls" circa 1970

- Quebec, Canada
  - Montreal (Montréal–Dorval International Airport)
- Rhode Island
  - Providence (T. F. Green Airport)
- Vermont
  - Burlington (Burlington International Airport)
  - Rutland (Rutland State Airport)
- Virginia
  - Arlington (Washington National Airport)

Airports marked with an asterisk (*) are not now served by any scheduled airline.

== Fleet ==
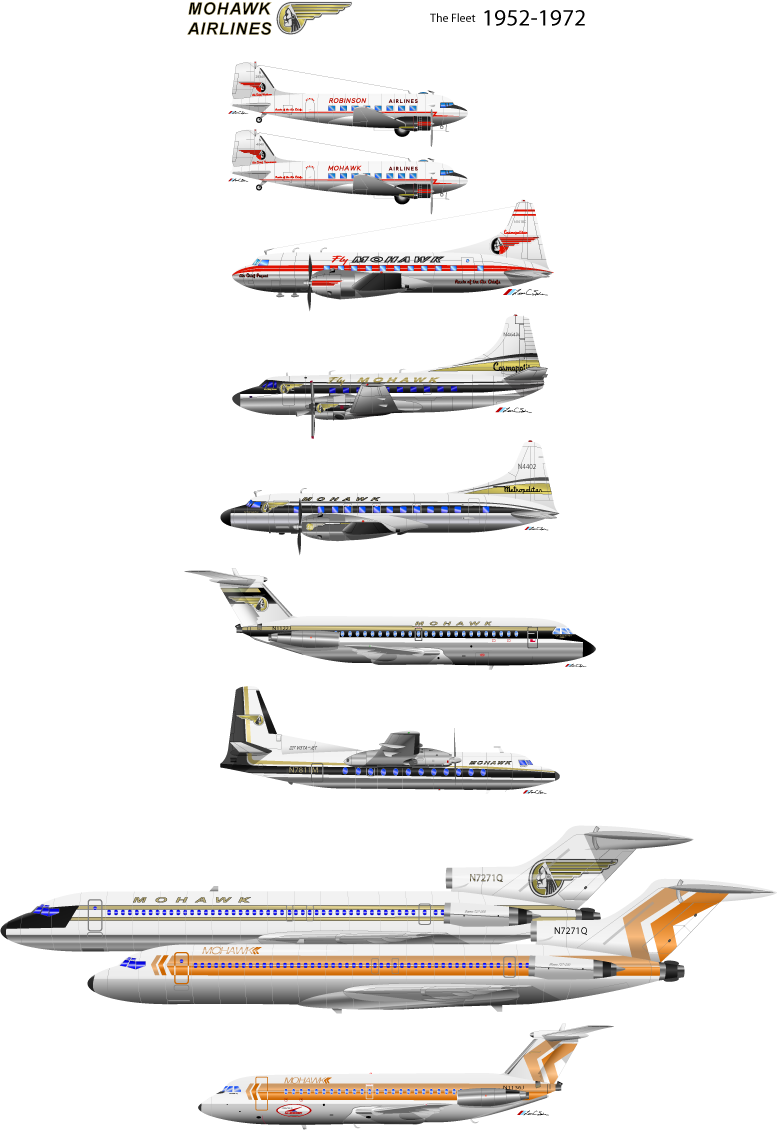

From top to bottom:

- Douglas DC-3 (in Robinson Airlines livery)
- Douglas DC-3 (in Mohawk Airlines livery)
- Convair 240
- Martin 4-0-4
- Convair 440
- BAC One-Eleven (initial livery)
- Fairchild Hiller FH-227B
- Boeing 727-200 (ordered but never delivered or operated)
- BAC One-Eleven (in final livery before Allegheny Airlines acquisition)

=== Historical fleet ===
Mohawk Airlines historical fleet
Aircraft	Total	Introduced	Retired	Remark
BAC One-Eleven 200	24	1965	1972	
Convair CV-240	21	1955	1967	
Convair CV-440 Metropolitan	5	1959	1971	
Convair CV-580	2	1964	1967	
Convair CV-640	1	1958	1965	
Douglas DC-3	7	1948	1963	
Douglas C-47 Skytrain	6	1952	1963	
Fairchild Hiller FH-227B	23	1966	1972	
Martin 4-0-4	16	1961	1965	

== Accidents and incidents ==
- 4 September 1950: A Robinson Airlines DC-3 crashed shortly after taking off from the Oneida County Airport near Utica, New York; 11 passengers and three crew members died.
- 16 October 1961: At Bradley Field in Windsor Locks, Connecticut, a Mohawk twin-engine Convair performed a belly landing when the pilot failed to put the wheels down before landing. None of the 12 passengers or 3 crew members were injured.
- 2 July 1963: At Rochester, New York, Mohawk Airlines Flight 121 (a Martin 4-0-4) attempted to take off into a thunderstorm. Its wing-tip hit the ground and the aircraft cartwheeled; 7 died, 36 were injured.
- 1 March 1964: At Broome County Airport, a Mohawk Airlines twin-engined plane crashed during landing and was heavily damaged when the pilot accidentally retracted the landing gear. The 44 occupants escaped the plane through emergency exits without injury.
- 23 June 1967: Mohawk Airlines Flight 40 (a BAC 1-11) flying from Elmira, New York, to Washington, D.C., suffered a fire in the rear of the aircraft that destroyed the vertical tail, causing all loss of pitch control. The cause was a non-return valve failure in the APU unit, resulting in hydraulic fluid igniting. The aircraft crashed near Blossburg, Pennsylvania; all 34 people on board died.
- 19 November 1969: Mohawk Airlines Flight 411 (a Fairchild-Hiller FH-227B) crashed into Pilot Knob on the east shore of Lake George, New York, on approach to Warren County Airport, Glens Falls, New York; all 14 on board died.
- 26 January 1972: Mohawk Airlines Flight 452 from Albany to LaGuardia Airport in New York City was hijacked and diverted to Westchester County Airport. The hijacker permitted the 42 passengers aboard to disembark there while he negotiated his demand for $200,000 cash. After several hours on the ground with the hijacker holding a flight attendant at gunpoint, Mohawk met his demands and the crew then flew the FH-227 airplane with the hijacker to Dutchess County Airport, landing after 3 a.m. As the 45-year old hijacker attempted to flee the airport in a getaway car, he was killed instantly by a shotgun blast from an FBI agent.
- 3 March 1972: Mohawk Airlines Flight 405 (another FH-227) crashed into a house in Albany, New York, on approach to Albany County Airport. The crew had difficulty getting the cruise lock to disengage in one of the engines. While the crew attempted to deal with the problem, the aircraft crashed short of the airfield; 16 of the 48 people in the aircraft, and one person on the ground, died. The lone surviving crew member was a stewardess, Sandra Quinn.

== See also ==
- List of defunct airlines of the United States
