= Greater Binghamton Airport =

Greater Binghamton Airport Edwin A. Link Field

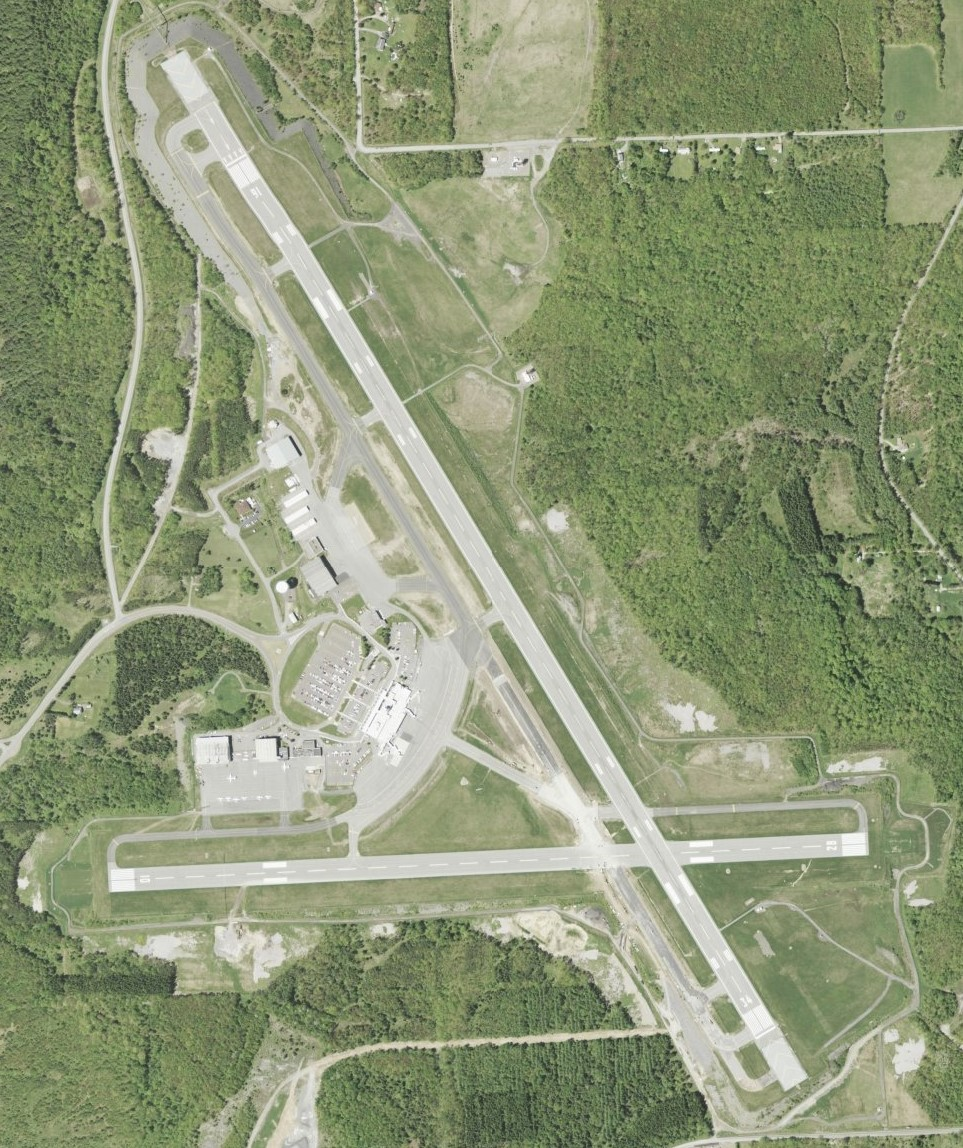
- USGS 2006 orthophoto
- IATA: BGM; ICAO: KBGM; FAA LID: BGM

Summary
- Airport type: Public
- Owner: Broome County United States
- Serves: Binghamton, New York, United States
- Location: 2534 Airport Rd., Johnson City, New York, United States
- Elevation AMSL: 1,636 ft (499 m)
- Coordinates: 42°12′31″N 075°58′47″W
- Website: www.FlyBGM.com

Maps
- FAA airport diagram (2013)
- Interactive map of Greater Binghamton Airport

Runways
Direction	Length		Surface
Direction	ft	m	Surface
16/34	7,305	2,227	Asphalt
10/28	5,001	1,524	Asphalt

Statistics (2021)
- Aircraft operations (year ending 1/31/2021): 13,323
- Based aircraft (2021): 39
- Source: Federal Aviation Administration

Greater Binghamton Airport (IATA: BGM, ICAO: KBGM, FAA LID: BGM) is a county-owned American airport eight miles north of Binghamton, in Broome County, New York. It is in east Maine, New York and serves the Southern Tier of New York.

The airport was named Broome County Airport through the 1970s. It was renamed Edwin A. Link Field-Broome County Airport to honor the inventor of the aircraft instrument simulator, the Link Trainer, a name it kept until the 1990s when it was again renamed as Binghamton Regional Airport. The name Greater Binghamton Airport was chosen in 2003. The field is still named in Link's honor.

The National Plan of Integrated Airport Systems for 2011–2015 categorized it as a primary commercial service airport (more than 10,000 enplanements per year). Federal Aviation Administration records say the airport had 108,325 passenger boardings (enplanements) in calendar year 2008, 98,090 in 2009 and 108,988 in 2010.

== History ==
The Greater Binghamton Airport (BGM) (originally Broome County Airport) has served Binghamton for six decades. Development started in 1945, due to difficult night operations at the Tri-Cities Airport in Endicott, New York during World War II. Broome County Airport opened in 1951 with a 5,600-foot main Runway 16/34, and a 5,002-foot crosswind Runway 10/28.

An approach lighting system was added in 1959 to the runway 34 approach end. The main runway was extended 700 feet in 1969. In the early 1980s the field was renamed Edwin A. Link Field-Broome County Airport in honor of Edwin A. Link a well-known inventor and aviation pioneer in the Binghamton area. Mr. Link was known for the creation of the Link Trainer, the first trainer that taught pilots how to fly in instrument meteorological conditions using only the instruments in the cockpit ("Facility Orientation Guide", n.d.).

In the 1950s Mohawk, Trans World Airlines, and Colonial Airlines (later Eastern Air Lines) stopped at BGM; TWA left in 1965 and Eastern left in 1969-70. Mohawk's successors' jets still stopped into the 1990s. In the 1980s a commuter airline, Brockway Air, flew Beechcraft 1900s and Fokker F-27s from Broome County airport to Syracuse, Boston, Albany, Keene, NH, Worcester, Burlington, and Rutland. Flying Tiger Lines flew Canadair CL-44Ds into the airport five times a week in the 1960s.

The south, southeast-facing runway 16 gained an instrument landing system during the 1970s along with a medium intensity approach lighting system with runway alignment indicator lights to lower landing minimums, but the localizer antenna was placed to the east of the runway with an offset. The airport began extending the north end of the main runway 16/34 in 1988; the extension from 6,298 to 7,500 feet was completed in October 1990. In 1991 the airport was renamed to Binghamton Regional Airport. In 2002 Runway 16/34 was shortened to 7,100 feet to make room for an Engineered Material Arresting System (EMAS). The EMAS is a bed of material that will crush under the weight of an aircraft, stopping the aircraft in the event of a runway overrun.

In 2003, the airport was again renamed to the Greater Binghamton Airport. The airport's old linear terminal was unable to keep up with regional jet traffic, and four new jet bridges opened in July 2004. BGM got a $12.3 million federal grant in September 2011 to replace the old EMAS system installed in 2002 and extend Runway 16/34 to 7,304 feet. The project was completed in November 2012 and led to a displaced threshold on Runway 34.

The airport lost significant airline service in the 2010s, with United Airlines and American Airlines exiting the airport in 2016, leaving the airport with one carrier, a single Delta Air Lines route to Detroit, for several years.

In August 2022, low-cost carrier Avelo Airlines announced new service from Binghamton to Fort Myers and Orlando in Florida. These flights would be operated by a Boeing 737-800 aircraft. This is the first service to Florida the airport has had. The airline canceled the launch of its Fort Myers focus city on October 13, citing a lack of bookings due to Hurricane Ian. Avelo would pull out of the Binghamton market entirely in 2024, citing a lack of profitability, leaving Delta once again as the only airline serving the airport.

On September 14, 2022, New York Governor Kathy Hochul announced that the Greater Binghamton Airport was being awarded funds for renovations under the state's Upstate Airport Economic Development and Revitalization initiative. US$32 million of state funds and $5M from other sources was earmarked for upgrades including integration of the general aviation and passenger terminals, replacement of the loading-zone canopy, and construction of new facilities for U.S. Customs and Border Protection.

== Facilities ==
The airport covers 1,199 acres (485 ha) at an elevation of 1,636 feet (499 m). It has two asphalt runways: 16/34 is 7,305 by 150 feet (2,227 x 46 m) and 10/28 is 5,001 by 150 feet (1,524 x 46 m).

For the year ending January 31, 2021 the airport had 13,323 aircraft operations, average 36 per day: 84% general aviation, 13% air taxi, 3% military, and <1% airline. 39 aircraft were then based at the airport: 25 single-engine, 10 multi-engine, and 4 jet.

== Airline and destinations ==
Airlines	Destinations
Delta Connection	Detroit

=== Top destinations ===
Busiest domestic routes out of BGM (March 2025– February 2026)
Rank	City	Passengers	Carriers
1	Detroit, Michigan	14,310	Delta

== Incidents ==
- In June 1952 a U.S. Navy North American SNJ Texan trainer crashed 250 yards east of the airport. The pilot suffered minor injuries.
- On July 23, 1955, a U.S. Naval Reserve Grumman TBM Avenger crashed short of the runway. The pilot suffered minor injuries.
- On September 4, 1957, a U.S. Air Force Douglas C-124A Globemaster II en route from Larson AFB, Washington crashed while attempting a landing. The plane was delivering 20 tons of equipment for Link Aviation. The crew of 9 survived.
- On November 24, 2010, United Airlines Flight 7823, a United Express Saab 340 turboprop operated by Colgan Air made an emergency landing after the crew received a fire indication in the left engine while passing through 10,000 feet. The flight was bound for Washington Dulles International Airport. On landing in Binghamton, 16 minutes after takeoff, all 33 passengers evacuated via over-wing emergency exits. None required medical attention. Maintenance determined the cause of the fire indication was a faulty sensor. Passengers continued to Washington after about a five-hour delay.

== See also ==
- List of airports in New York (disambiguation)
