= List of airports in New York =

List of airports in New York may refer to:

- Aviation in the New York metropolitan area
- List of airports in New York (state)
