= List of defunct airlines of the United States (A–C) =

The following is a list of defunct airlines of the United States. However, some of these airlines have ceased operations completely, changed identities and/or FAA certificates and are still operating under a different name (e.g. America West Airlines changed to use the identity of US Airways in 2005 – which itself also changed identity to American Airlines in 2015).

For reasons of size, this article is broken into four parts:

- List of defunct airlines of the United States (A–C)
- List of defunct airlines of the United States (D–I)
- List of defunct airlines of the United States (J–P)
- List of defunct airlines of the United States (Q–Z)

Airline	State or territory	Image	IATA	ICAO	Callsign	Hubs and focus cities	Commenced operations	Ceased operations	Notes
0–9
135 Airlines	Texas			GNL		Dallas Love Field	1995	1995	
4 W Air	Alaska					King Salmon	2003	2003	
A
AAA Air Enterprises	Nebraska					Eppley Airfield	1977	1986	Acquired by Mid-Continent Airlines
AAI Alaska Aeronautical Industries	Alaska		YC	ALR		Anchorage	1954	1987	Agreement with Continental Airlines
AAXICO Airlines	Florida		AX	AX	AAXICO	Miami	1946	1965	Acquired by Saturn Airways, w/ AAXICO the surviving management and ownership.
Abbe Air Cargo	Alaska					Wasilla	2001	2003	Operated C-47
ABC Airlines	California					Ontario	1965	1966	
Absaroka Airways	Montana					Red Lodge	1994	2012	Scenic flights around the Beartooth Mountains. Operated Cessna 172
ACA Aviation Corporation of the Americas	Alaska					Anchorage	1927	1932	Founded by Juan Trippe
Academy Airlines	Georgia			ACD	ACADEMY	Atlanta	1979	2006	
AccessAir	Iowa		ZA	CYD	CYCLONE	Des Moines	1998	2001	
Ace Air Cargo Express	Ohio		CG	AER		Cleveland Hopkins	1976	1982	Renamed Shalkow Air Cargo Express. Operated C-47
Ace Airways	Massachusetts						1965	1971	Operated Beech D18S
Ace Aviation	Maine						1979	2000	Air charter service
ACM Aviation	California			BJT	BAYJET	San Jose	?	2010	Acquired by TWC Aviation
Action Airlines	Connecticut		XQ	AXQ	ACTION AIR	Goodspeed	1979	2000	
Active Aero Charter	Michigan			AVR	ACTIVE AERO	Willow Run	1999	2000	
ADI Aerodynamics	Michigan		4A	DYN	AERODYNAMICS	Oakland Pontiac	2011	2018	Acquired by California Pacific Airlines. Operated Embraer ERJ 145
ADI Domestic Airlines	Illinois			C14		Chicago O'Hare	1992	1998	
Adirondack Airlines	New York					Adirondack	1991	1991	
Admiral Airways	California					Burbank	1961	1962	Supplemental air carrier. Originally Quaker City Airways. CAB refused to certificate the airline in 1962 due to combine activities.
Admiralty Air	Florida					Palm Beach	2009	2017	Operated Embraer ERJ-135
Ads-Aloft	Washington					Seattle	1994	1995	Banner towing company
Advanced Air Management	California					Burbank	2000	2015	Renamed Zetta Jet
Adventure Airlines	Nevada					Las Vegas McCarran	1995	1996	
Adventure Aviation	Idaho					Coeur d'Alene	1995	1995	Scenic flights
Aerial Transit Company	Florida			AEZ	AERIAL TRANZ	Miami	1982	1994	Sold to Southeast Cargo Airlines in 1994. Operated 707, DC-6
Aerie Airlines	Tennessee					Clarksville–Montgomery	1971	1979	
Aero Coach	Florida		DF	DFA	AEROCOACH	Fort Lauderdale	1983	1991	Operated Cessna 402, Embraer Bandeirante
Aero Commuter	California					Long Beach	1967	1969	Merged with Cable Commuter Airlines and Catalina Airlines
Aero Contractors	North Carolina				Smithfield		1979	2006	Charter carrier that provided flights for CIA
Aero Corporation of California	California					Los Angeles	1926	1930	Operated Universal Aircraft
Aero Flight Services	Florida					Fort Lauderdale	1976	2000	Operated Hawker 400A, Learjet 23, Learjet 25
Aero Limited	Florida					Miami	1919	1919	Acquired by Aeromarine Sightseeing and Navigation Company
Aero Taxi Rockford	Illinois					Chicago Rockford	1998	2001	Cargo carrier
Aero Union	California					Chico	1960	2011	Lost federal firefighting contract as a result of the U.S. Forest Service airtanker scandal.
Aero Virgin Islands	Virgin Islands					St. Thomas	1977	1990	
Aero West Airlines	Colorado					Colorado Springs	1982	1982	Acquired the assets of Royal West Airlines. Operated DC-3
Aeroamerica	Washington		EO	AEO	AEROAMERICA	Seattle; Berlin Tegel	1973	1982	Uncertificated carrier
Aerocosta	Florida					Miami	1972	1972	Cargo carrier
Aerodynamics Inc.	Georgia		4A	DYN	AERODYNAMICS	Denver	1959	2018	Acquired by California Pacific Airlines.
Aeroflex Corporation	New Jersey					Aeroflex–Andover	1958	1971	Operated Beech E18S, Beech Bonanza, Hiller UH-12
Aerolaska	Alaska						1982	1986	
Aeromarine Airways	Florida					Key West	1921	1924	Operated Felixstowe F5L flying boat
Aeromarine West Indies Airways	Florida					Biscayne Bay	1920	1924	Formed by a merger between Florida West Indies Airways and Aeromarine Sightseeing and Navigation Company. Reorganized as Aeromarine Airways
Aeromech Airlines	West Virginia		KC	RZZ	AEROMECH	North Central West Virginia Airport	1951	1983	Merged into Wright Air Lines
Aeronaut Air Services	Mississippi					Gulfport-Biloxi	1966	1966	Operated DC-3
Aerostar Airlines	Georgia					Atlanta	1981	1983	Went bankrupt and sold to Flight International Airlines. Operated Boeing 727
Aerosun International	Florida			ASI	AEROSUN	Miami	1978	1982	Established as Red Carpet Airlines. Operated Convair 440, DC-3
Aerovias Sud Americana	Florida		JI	JI		St Petersburg	1947	1965	Scheduled freight operator from Florida to Latin America.
AEX Air	Arizona			DST	DESERT	Phoenix Sky Harbor	2004	2006	Charter operator
aha!	Nevada		EV	ASQ	ACEY	Reno-Tahoe	2021	2022	Commenced operations as ExpressJet in 1987. Announced liquidation in 2022.
Aho Flying Service	Alaska					Anchorage	1930	1930	
Air Alaska Cargo	Washington		8S			Spokane	1986	1998	Began as Salair
Air America								1954	Irregular air carrier shut in 1954 by CAB for flying scheduled service
Air America	District of Columbia		GM	AMR	AIR AMERICA	Saigon; Vientiane; Udorn	1950	1976	Founded by Claire Lee Chennault as Civil Air Transport. Operated by the CIA
Air America	California		GM	AMR		Los Angeles	1989	1990	Established as Total Air in 1984
Air Americana	Florida					Tampa	1965	1981	Established as Aerovias Sud Americana in 1947. Operated DC-3, Lockheed L-1649
Air Astro	California					Los Angeles	1968	1971	Operated Carstedt Jet Liner 600
Air Atlanta	Georgia		CC	CRB	AIRLAN	Atlanta	1984	1987	
Air Aurora	Illinois		AX	AAI		Aurora	1977	2000	Air taxi operator
Air Bahia	California					San Diego	1979	1980	
Air Bama	Alabama			ABI		Montgomery	1978	1984	Operated Beech 18, HP Jetstream
Air Berlin USA			AB	BER	AIR BERLIN	Berlin Tegel	1978	1992	Reconstituted as Air Berlin GmbH & Co. Luftverkehrs KG in 1990 under German company law.
Air California	California		OC	ACL	AIRCAL	Orange County	1967	1987	Merged into American Airlines.
Air Cargo Express	Alaska		3K	FXG	CARGO EXPRESS	Fairbanks	1995	1995	
Air Cargo Hawaii	Hawaii					Honolulu	1977	1992	Established in 1973 as Air Distribution. Operated Shorts Skyvan
Air Cargo Masters	South Dakota					Sioux Falls	1995	2006	Operated Beech 1900, Beech Queen Air, SA227
Air Cargo Transport	New Jersey					Newark	1945	1948	Operated C-47
Air Caribbean	Puerto Rico					San Juan	1975	1979	
Air Carolina	South Carolina		FN			Florence	1967	1980	Established as Florence Airlines. Absorbed by Atlantis Airlines.
Air Carriers	Alabama			FCI		Chilton County	1989	2003	Operated Cessna 208 Caravan
Air Carriers Express Services	Georgia					Atlanta	1985	1985	Operated Cessna 208 Caravan
Air Catalina	California					Catalina	1965	1976	Founded as Catalina Channel Airlines
Air Central	Minnesota					Minneapolis–Saint Paul	1972	1973	Operated Cessnas
Air Central	Oklahoma					Enid Woodring	1978	1980	Renamed Trans-Central Airlines. Operated Piper Chieftain
Air Central	Texas			ACS	AIR CENTRAL	Harlingen	1978	1979	
Air Chaparral	Nevada			MAV	MAVERICK	Reno–Tahoe	1980	1983	
Air Charter Service	California					Riverside	1968	1972	Operated Beech Bonanza, Cessna 150
Air Charter West							1974	1977	
Air Chicago	Illinois					Chicago Midway	1981	1982	
Air Chico	California					Chico	1980	1982	
Air Choice One	Missouri		3E	WBR	WEBER	St. Louis	1979	2022	Transferred to the Southern Airways Express brand.
Air Colorado	Colorado			TAC		Denver	1980	1981	
Air Commuter Airlines	Ohio					Cleveland Burke	1967	1968	Merged with Wright Airlines
Air Continental	Ohio			NAR	NIGHT AIR	Cleveland Hopkins	1979	1989	Acquired by US Check Airlines. Operated Learjet 23
Air Contract Cargo	Michigan					Oakland County	1983	1992	To Gulf and Caribbean Cargo
Air Cortez	California		AB	ACI	AIR CORTEZ	Ontario	1977	1986	
Air Distribution	Hawaii					Honolulu	1973	1975	To Air Cargo Hawaii. Operated Shorts Skyvan
Air East	Pennsylvania					Johnstown–Cambria	1967	1974	
Air East	Texas					Scholes–Galveston	1969	1971	Established as Aerosmith Airlines
Air East Airlines	Louisiana					Lafayette	1970	1980	Connected to New Orleans
Air Enterprises	West Virginia					Huntington Tri-State	1969	1971	Renamed Tri-State Flying Service
Air Excursions	Alaska					Gustavus	2013	2013	Founded by Steve Wilson. To Alaska Seaplane
Air Exec Ontario	California					Ontario	1981	1985	Operated DC-3
Air Express	Colorado					Denver	1932		
Air Ferries	California					Alameda	1930	1933	Connected to San Francisco and Oakland
Air Florida	Florida		QH	FLA	PALM	Miami	1971	1984	Air Florida Commuter was an affiliate
Air Florida Commuter	Florida		QH	FLA	PALM	Miami	1980	1984	Air Florida Commuter was an affiliate
Air Hawaii	Hawaii		HP			Honolulu	1977	1983	Founded by Bruce McKenzie by a merger with Island Pacific Air and Air Molokai
Air Hawaii	Hawaii		XK	AHC	AIR HAWAII	Honolulu	1985	1986	
Air Hemet	California					Hemet-Ryan	1964	1984	Connected to desert cities with Los Angeles
Air Holiday International	Wisconsin					Milwaukee	1973	1977	Owned by Robert W. Larson.
Air Idaho	Idaho					Twin Falls	1974	1975	Founded as Trans Magic Airlines
Air Illinois	Illinois		UX	AIL	AIR ILLINOIS	Springfield–Branson	1970	1984	
Air Indiana	Indiana					Evansville			
Air Iowa	Iowa					Muscatine	1971	1974	Operated Beech 18
Air Irvine	California					Orange County	1982	1983	Acquired by Dash Air
Air Juneau	Alaska					Juneau	2001	2001	
Air Kentucky	Kentucky		KN	AKY	AIR KENTUCKY	Owensboro–Daviess	1970	1989	Commenced operations in 1974.
Air Ketchum	Idaho		L3			Hailey	1999	2000	Operated Beech King Air
Air L.A.	California		UE	UED		Los Angeles	1982	1995	Purchased Conquest Airlines.
Air Lincoln	Illinois			ALN	CHICAGO LINCOLN	Chicago Midway	1982	1982	
Air Link Airlines	Colorado			LNK	AIR LINK	Denver	1981	1984	Founded as Valley Airpark. Acquired by Fort Collins Flying Service in 1981.
Air Link Airways	Texas					Houston Bush	1986	1988	
Air Marc	New York					New York Kennedy	1984	1985	Founded as Eastman Airways.
Air Metro Airlines	Michigan		DZ			Traverse City	1975	1976	Operated Beech 99
Air Miami	Florida		VW			Miami	1977	1980	Renamed North American Airlines. Operated CASA 212
Air Michigan	Michigan					Kalamazoo	1969	1972	Operated Beech 99, Twin Otter, Cessna 310
Air Mid-America Airlines	Illinois					Chicago Meigs Field	1969	1970	Operated DC-3
Air Midway	Nebraska					Kearney	1992	1994	Founded by Clyde Mikelson. Operated Cessna 185, Piper Aztec
Air Midwest	Kansas		ZV	AMW	AIR MIDWEST	Kansas City	1965	2008	Commenced operations in 1967.
Air Missouri	Michigan		BF			Kirksville	1976	1978	Established as Horizon Airways. Operated Cessna 207
Air Molokai	Hawaii					Honolulu	1985	1988	Founded as Tropic Airlines
Air National			6A	ANE	AIR TARA		1981	1984	
Air Nebraska	Nebraska					Kearney	1976	1981	Operated Cessna 402, Piper Navajo
Air Nevada	California					Los Angeles	1969	1970	Established as Hawthorne-Nevada Airlines. Operated DC-3
Air Nevada	Nevada			ANV	AIR NEVADA	Las Vegas McCarran	1974	1998	
Air New England	Massachusetts		NE			Boston	1970	1981	
Air New Mexico	New Mexico					Las Cruces	1980	1980	Founded as Zia Airlines
Air New-Mexico	New Mexico						1961	1964	
Air New Orleans	Alabama		NT	ANL	AIR NEW ORLEANS	Birmingham–Shuttlesworth	1981	1988	
Air New Ulm	Minnesota					New Ulm	1973	1977	Renamed Lake State Airways
Air Newark Inc.	New Jersey		2N	NER	NEWAIR	Fort Lee	1961	1964	
Air Niagara	New York		NA			Niagara Falls	1978	1984	
Air North	Vermont		NO	ANO	AIR NORTH	Burlington	1963	1988	Established as Northern Airways. Contract for Allegheny Commuter in 1970. Acquired by Brockway Air in 1983.
Air North	Alaska					Fairbanks	1982	1984	
Air O'Hare	Illinois					Chicago O'Hare	1974	1975	Operated C-47AQ Skytrain
Air Oasis	California						1962	1964	Operated DC-3
Air Olympia	Washington					Olympia	1981	1982	
Air Omni	Florida						1980	1980	Failed merger between Florida Airlines and Marco Island Airways
Air One	Missouri		CB	AON	GATEWAY	St. Louis	1983	1984	Remains merged into Interstate Airlines in 1987. All first class service.
Air Oregon	Oregon		JT		AIR OREGON	Portland	1978	1981	Merged with Horizon Air.
Air Pac	Alaska		5P	APM	ALASKA PACIFIC	Dutch Harbor	1982	1986	Renamed Air Pacific
Air Pacific	California		IK			Oakland	1970	1981	Founded as Eureka Aero. Merged with Gem State Airlines to form Golden Gate Airlines.
Air Pennsylvania	Pennsylvania					Reading	1976	1982	
Air Rajneesh	Oregon					Big Muddy Ranch	1985	1985	Operated Convair 240
Air Resorts	California		UZ	ARZ	AIR RESORTS	McClellan–Palomar	1975	1996	
Air Response North	New York			RPS		New York-LaGuardia	1986	2003	Renamed Global Air Response. Operated Learjet 24, Learjet 25, Learjet 35
Air San Juan	Washington					Friday Harbor	1990	1991	Founded as ChartAir
Air Sedona	Arizona					Sedona	1983	1988	
Air Services								1959	Supplemental air carrier shut by CAB in 1959 for combine activities
Air Shamrock							1999	2007	
Air Shannon	Virginia					Washington National	1966	1967	
Air South (Florida)	Florida	https://encrypted-tbn0.gstatic.com/images?q=tbn:ANd9GcSIcCJgqst_P_XUGzMDSc01dF43IPxOJPoMh48n5aK1Lg&s	GD		SHAWNEE	Miami Homestead	1986	1987	Operated Trislander. Owner previously associated with Shawnee Airlines, Bahamas Caribbean Airline, Aero International, Bahamas Air Bridge and Argosy Airlines
Air South (Georgia)	Georgia					Atlanta	1969	1978	Founded as Nationwide Airlines Southeast. Acquired by Florida Airlines in 1975.
Air South (South Carolina)	South Carolina		WV	KKB	KHAKI BLUE	Columbia (SC)	1993	1997	Commenced operations in 1994.
Air Spirit	Texas			SIP	AIR SPIRIT	Dallas Love Field	1981	1984	Founded as Cen-Tex Airlines. Operated Embraer Bandeirante
Air St. Thomas	Virgin Islands		ZP	SST		St. Thomas	1975	2005	
Air Sunshine	Florida		AG	AAT		Miami	1974	1979	Founded as American Air Taxi in 1972. Absorbed by Air Florida
Air Tahoma	Ohio			HMA	TAHOMA	Columbus	1995	2009	
Air Taos	New Mexico					Taos	1977	1979	
Air Taxi	South Carolina					Florence	1969	1969	Renamed Florence Airlines
Air Texana	Texas					Lufkin	1980	1981	
Air Traders International	California					Los Angeles	1980	1980	Operated 2 L-1049 Super Constellation
Air Traffic Service							1972	1980	
Air Trails	California					Salinas	1960	1999	Renamed Million Air Monterey. Operated Beech King Air, Cessna 310, Cessna 550
Air Train	California		GJ	ATF	AIR TRAIN	San Jose	1987	1989	CF AirFreight-contractor. Became Emery Worldwide Airlines
Air Transit	Arizona					Show Low	1959	1968	
Air Transport Associates	Washington					Seattle	1948	1953	Irregular air carrier shut by the CAB in 1953 for flying scheduled service.
Air Transport Services	Alaska					Kodiak	1984	1988	Acquired by PenAir
Air Travel	California					Oakland	1946	1947	Original name of Overseas National Airways. Became Calasia Air Transport in 1947
Air Trine	Florida					Miami	1976	1977	Operated Convair 880
Air U.S.	Wyoming; Colorado					Riverton; Denver	1978	1984	Renamed Excellair
Air Vectors Airways	New York					Newburgh	1979	1985	Founded by Jim Aspin. Contract carrier for FedEx.
Air Vegas	Nevada		6V	VGA	AIR VEGAS	North Las Vegas	1971	2004	
Air Vermont	Vermont		MU	VER	AIR VERMONT	Burlington	1981	1984	
Air Virginia	Virginia		CE	FVA	AIR VIRGINIA	Lynchburg	1979	1988	Established as Cardinal Airlines. Renamed AVAir in 1985
Air-Lift Commuter	North Carolina		3L	WPK		Raleigh Durham	1976	1988	Operated Fairchild Swearingen Metroliner
Air-Speed	Massachusetts					Hanscom Field	1974	1980	Operated Beech 99, Piper Cherokee
Air21	California		A7	UBA	ROCKETEER	Fresno Yosemite	1995	1997	Operated Fokker F-28, bankrupt
Airborne Express	Ohio		GB	ABX	ABEX	Wilmington, Ohio	1980	1989	Previously Midwest Air Charter. Renamed ABX Air
Airborne Transport	Florida					Miami	1948	1948	Operated Douglas DST-144
Aircharters World				WFT	WORLD FLIGHT		1994	1994	Charter carrier
AirCal	California		OC	ACL	AIRCAL	Orange County	1981	1987	Established as Air California
AirClub International	Washington					Boeing Field	1971	1975	Originally Club International, the air travel club that preceded Aeroamerica
Aircraft Pool Leasing Corporation	Florida					Miami	1973	?	Operated L-1049 Super Constellation
AirExec	Maryland					Ocean City	1973	1975	Operated Twin Otter
Airgo Air Freight	Texas					Dallas Love Field	1977	1981	Operated Vickers Viscount, DC-3, Convair 440
Airlift International	Florida		RD	AIR	AIRLIFT	Miami	1964	1992	Rebranded from Riddle Airlines; all-cargo airline, contemporary of Flying Tiger
Airline of the Americas	Tennessee			AOA	ALL AMERICAS	Smyrna	1992	1993	Charter carrier made famous by Travelgate. Became UltrAir.
Airline Transport Carriers	California					Burbank	1946	1962	Irregular air carrier dba California Hawaiian, sister airline to California Central
Airmark Aviation				TRH	TRANSTAR		1991	1993	Renamed Transtar Airlines
Airmark Corporation				MRC	AIRMARC		1983	1985	VIP charters carrier
AirNow	Vermont			RLR	RATTLER	Bennington	1957	2011	Established as Business Air
AirOne			K3	QTN			1998	2002	
Airpac	Alaska			APM	ALASKA PACIFIC		1978	1986	
Airplane Charter by Mercer						Hollywood Burbank	1945	1949	Irregular air carrier, renamed Associated Airways in 1949.
Airship Airways						Fort Lauderdale-Hollywood	1998	2000	Renamed Planet Airways
Airship Ventures	California					Moffett Federal Airfield	2008	2012	
AirSpur	California		OT	ASU	SPUR EXPRESS	Los Angeles	1981	1985	Acquired by Evergreen International Airlines
AirTrain Airlines	Pennsylvania					Pittsburgh	1993	1995	Renamed Jettrain in 1996
AirTran Airways	Florida		FL	TRS	CITRUS	Orlando Milwaukee	1992	2014	Merged into Southwest Airlines
AirTran JetConnect	Wisconsin		FL	TRS	CITRUS	Appleton	2002	2004	Operated for Air Wisconsin
AirVantage Airlines	Minnesota		3N	AVV	AIRVANTAGE	St. Paul Downtown	1981	1997	
Airvia Transportation Company	New York					New York City	1929	1929	Operated Savoia-Marchetti S.55
Airways International	Florida		4A	AWB	AIRNAT	Miami	1981	1999	
Airways of New Mexico	New Mexico			ANM	AIR NEW MEXICO		1977	1984	
Aladdin Air Services	Utah					Panguitch	1996	2001	
Alair	Alabama		KB			Anniston	1977	1979	
Alamo Jet	Alabama		KB			Stinson	1992	1998	Charter carrier
Alaska Aerial Transportation Company	Alaska						1924	1924	
Alaska Air Taxi	Alaska						1995	2006	Operated Texas Turbines Super Otter
Alaska Air Transport	Alaska					Juneau	1935	1939	Merged with Marine Airways to form Alaska Coastal Airlines.
Alaska Cargo	Alaska						2004	2004	
Alaska Central Airways	Alaska					Ruby	1974	1981	Founded as Tanana Air Taxi. Acquired by Harold’s Air Service in 1981.
Alaska Coastal Airlines	Alaska					Juneau	1939	1968	Acquired by Alaska Airlines.
Alaska Flying Tours	Alaska					Fairbanks	2001	2001	Tour service operator
Alaska Interior Airlines	Alaska					Anchorage Merrill Field	1936	1937	Acquired by Star Air Lines
Alaska International Air	Alaska		BF	AKA	INTERALAS	Anchorage	1972	1984	Founded as Interior Airways as an intrastate airline. Acquired Great Northern Airlines in 1980 and renamed Markair in 1984
Alaska Island Air	Alaska					Petersburg Johnson	1968	1988	Founded as Lon's Flying Service
Alaska Island Airways	Alaska					Juneau	1946	1954	Merged with Alaska Coastal Airlines
Alaska Mountain Flying Service	Alaska						1992	2009	
Alaska Southern Airways	Alaska						1932	1934	
Alaska Star Airlines	Alaska					Anchorage	1932	1944	Founded as Star Air Lines. Renamed Alaska Airlines in 1944.
Alaska West Air	Alaska						1989	2009	
Alaska-Washington Airways	Alaska						1929	1930	Acquired by Seattle-Wenatchee-Yakima Airways
Alaskan Airways	Alaska						1930	1932	Acquired by Pacific Alaska Airways
Alaskan Coastal Airways	Alaska						1986	1986	
Albany Air	New York		YU			Albany	1979	1979	
Albany Air Service	New York					Albany	1962	1964	
Alii Air Hawaii	Hawaii						1970	1975	Renamed Brandt Air in 1975
ALL	Colorado					Front Range	1988	2006	Cargo charter
All American Aviation	Pennsylvania					Pittisburgh	1937	1939	
All Hawaii Air	Hawaii					Honolulu	1979	1979	Cargo carrier
All Star Airlines	Massachusetts			ASR	ALL STAR	Woburn	1985	1993	Charter carrier
All-American Airways	Florida					Miami	1948	1960	Supplemental air carrier renamed Saturn Airways in 1960
All West Freight	Alaska					Nikiski	1996	2012	Operated Fairchild C-123 Provider
All-America Airlines	California					Long Beach	1994	1994	
Allcair Air Transport	Texas					Laredo	1993	1993	Operated Douglas C-118
Allegheny Air Cargo	Pennsylvania					Pittsburgh	1947	1947	Operated Douglas DC-3
Allegheny Airlines	Pennsylvania		AL	ALO	ALLEGHENY	Pittsburgh	1959	1979	Renamed US Airways
Allegheny Commuter	Pennsylvania					DuBois	1969		Renamed Crown Airways
Allen Air Commuter	Kansas					Topeka	1967	1975	Founded as Allen Aviation. Acquired by Capitol Airlines
Alliance Airlines	Illinois			ALZ	ALLIANCE AIR	Chicago O'Hare	1984	1988	Acquired by Great Lakes Airlines
Allied Air Freight	Florida					Miami-Opa Locka	1996	2001	Operated Douglas C-47
Aloha Airlines	Hawaii		AQ	AAH	ALOHA	Honolulu	1946	2008	Founded as Trans-Pacific Airlines. Cargo operations still active under Aloha Air Cargo.
Aloha IslandAir	Hawaii					Honolulu	1987	1992	Founded as Princeville Airways. Acquired by Island Air
Aloha Pacific	Hawaii					Honolulu	1984	1985	
Alpha Air	California		7V	ALH	ALPHA AIR	Los Angeles	1976	1995	
Alpine Airbus	California					Los Angeles	1973	1973	
Alpine Aviation	Nevada					Nevada County Air Park	2005	2005	
Alpine Aviation Corporation	Illinois					Chicago Rockford	1980	1981	
Altair Airlines	Pennsylvania		AK	AAR	ALTAIR	Philadelphia	1967	1982	
Altus Airlines	Oklahoma		2U	AXS	ALTUS	Altus/Quartz Mountain	1985	1987	
Alyeska Air Service	Alaska			ALY	ALYESKA	Anchorage	1982	1989	
Ambassadair	Indiana			AMS		Indianapolis	1973	1981	Air travel club that was the genesis of American Trans Air
Ambassador Airlines	Nevada					Las Vegas McCarran	1963	1968	Operated Beech 18, Aero Commander 500
Amelia Airways	Florida					Fort Lauderdale Executive	1993	2000	On-demand service Operated Piper Navajo Chieftain
America West Airlines	Arizona		HP	AWE	CACTUS	Phoenix Sky Harbor	1981	2007	Commenced operations in 1983. Merged with US Airways, then merged with American Airlines
America West Express	Nevada		RP	CHQ	AIR SHUTTLE CHATAUQUA	Las Vegas McCarran	1985	2007	
AmericAir	Oklahoma		DE	AAR	PATRIOT	Washington Dulles	1983	1985	
American Air Taxi	Florida					Key West	1960	1974	Renamed Air Sunshine (1974). Operated Beech 99, Piper Aztec, de Havilland Heron
American Air Transport and Flight School	Florida					Miami	1948	1952	Irregular air carrier shut by the CAB in 1952 for flying scheduled service.
American Central Airlines	Iowa		JR	AAR		Dubuque	1980	1984	
American Export Airlines	New York					New York-LaGuardia	1937	1945	Renamed American Overseas Airlines
American Flyers Airline	Oklahoma					Ardmore	1949	1971	Taken over by Universal Airlines
American International Airways	Florida					Key West	1926	1927	Seaplane service to Havana
American International Airways	New York					New York-LaGuardia	1947	1949	Operated Boeing 314, DC-4
American International Airways	Pennsylvania		CB	CKS		Philadelphia	1967	2000	Merged with Kitty Hawk International and rebranded as Kalitta Air
American International Airways	New Jersey					Atlantic City	1981	1984	Established as Commercial Airlines in 1980. Operated MD-80, DC-9
American Overseas Airlines	New York					New York-LaGuardia	1937	1950	Founded as American Export Airlines. Merged with Pan American Airways
American Overseas							1980s	1980s	
American Railway Express	District of Columbia					Washington, D.C.	1918	1929	Freight service Renamed Railway Express Agency; Operated a Handley Page converted bomber
American Trans-Oceanic Company	New York					Port Washington	1916	1928	
AmericanConnection	Illinois		AX			Chicago O'Hare	2001	2014	
AMI Jet Charter	California					San Francisco	1998	2007	
Amistad Airline	Texas					Del Rio	1966	1980	
Anchorage Air Transport	Alaska					Anchorage	1927	1928	
Anchorage Airways	Alaska					Anchorage	1981	1982	Established as Air Logistics
Angier Flying Service	North Carolina					Piedmont Triad	1975	1975	
Antelope Airlines	Wyoming					Gillette–Campbell	1974	1975	
Apache Airlines	Arizona					Phoenix Sky Harbor	1957	1970	
Apex Air Cargo				APX	PARCEL EXPRESS	Honolulu	1987	1989	
Apollo Airways	California			SNC	SONIC	Santa Barbara	1969	1982	Renamed Pacific Coast Airlines
Appalachian Airlines	Tennessee		DI			Tri-Cities	1977	1980	
Arctic Circle Air	Alaska		5F	CIR	AIR ARCTIC	Fairbanks	1973	2009	Acquired by Era Alaska
Arctic Frontier Airways	Washington					Seattle–Tacoma	1948	1948	
Arctic Guide Air Taxi	Alaska					Barrow	1974	1985	Charter carrier
Arctic Pacific Airlines	Washington					Seattle-Tacoma	1947	1970	Charter carrier
Arctic Transportation Services	Alaska		7S	RCT		Anchorage	1950	2010	Rebranded as Ryan Air Services
Argonaut Airways	Florida					Miami	1946	1962	Supplemental air carrier cargo line. Voluntarily gave up operating authority in 1962
Argosy Air Lines	Florida		VJ	ARY	GOSEY	Fort Lauderdale Executive	1971	1978	
Aries Air Cargo	California					Los Angeles	1973	1973	Cargo carrier
Arista International Airlines	New York		RY			New York Kennedy	1982	1984	Established as Tourlite International Airlines in 1980.
Arizona Air	Arizona			AAE	ARIZONA	Scottsdale	1992	1995	Scenic flights and charter
Arizona Airways	Arizona			AAE	ARIZONA	Phoenix Sky Harbor	1946	1950	Merged with Summit Airways and Monarch Air Lines to form Frontier Airlines (1950–1986)
Arizona Airways (1993–1996)	Arizona		VZ	AZY	ARIZAIR	Tucson	1993	1996	To Arizona Airways Express
Arizona Airways Express	Arizona					Tucson	1995	1996	Merged into Great Lakes Airlines
Arizona Express	Arizona		K7	TMP	TEMPE	Phoenix Sky Harbor	2001	2005	
Arizona Helicopters	Arizona					Chandler	1970s	1970s	Operated in Laos during the 1970s
Arizona Pacific Airlines	Arizona			AZP	ARIZONA PACIFIC	Flagstaff	1981	1982	Began as Omni Airlines
Arkansas Traveler Airline	Arkansas			HOG	HOG-AIR		1984	1984	
Armstrong Air Service	Alaska					Dillingham	1985	1989	
Arnold Air Service	Alaska						1946	1946	Operated Douglas DC-3
Aroostook Airways	Maine					Presque Isle	1969	1972	
Arrow Air	Florida		JW	APW	BIG A	Miami	1981	2010	1980s follow-on from earlier 1940s/50s Arrow Airways
Arrow Airways	California					Torrance; Hollywood-Burbank Airport	1946	1951	Irregular air carrier shut down by Civil Aeronautics Board for illegal scheduled service
Arrowhead International Airlines	Minnesota					Duluth	1929	1930	Merged with Canadian-American Airlines; Operated Lockheed Vega
ASA (Alaska Southcoast Airways)	Alaska						1974	1974	
ASA International Airlines	Florida		JI	JI			1947	1965	Trade name for Aerovias Sud Americana
ASAP (All Seasons Air Pacific)	California				ALL	Long Beach	1981	1983	
Asheville Flying Service	North Carolina					Asheville	1982	1983	
Aspen Airways	Colorado		AP	ASP	ASPEN AIR	Denver Stapleton	1952	1990	Merged into Air Wisconsin
Aspen Airways Air Taxi	Colorado					Aspen	1953	1955	Renamed Aspen Airways
Aspen Mountain Air	Colorado		AD			Denver	1996	1998	See Lone Star Airlines
Associated Air Transport	Florida; Texas; New York		KS	KS	ASSOCIATED	Miami	1947	1962	Supplemental air carrier started by Charles F. Blair Jr.
Associated Airways	California					Burbank	1949	1951	Previously Airplane Charter by Mercer. Irregular air carrier shut by CAB in 1951 for scheduled svc
Astar Air Cargo	Florida		ER	DHL	DAHL	Cincinnati/Northern Kentucky	1969	2012	
Astec Air East	New York			AAE	AIR EAST	Canandaigua	1974	1982	
Astro Airways	Arkansas		JW	AST	ASTRO-AIR	Pine Bluff	1969	1995	
ATA Airlines	Indiana		TZ	AMT	AMTRAN	Chicago Midway	1973	2008	Founded as American Trans Air
ATA Connection	Illinois					Chicago Midway	1983	2008	
Atlanta Express	Georgia		FX		AYTEX	Atlanta	1982	1987	Merged into Sunbird Airlines
Atlanta Helicopter Airways	Georgia				CITRUS	Atlanta	1960	n/a	
Atlanta Skylarks	Georgia			SLK	SKYLARK	Atlanta	1966	1986	Renamed Independent Air in 1986
Atlantic & Pacific Airlines	Texas						1947	1947	Operated Douglas DC-3
Atlantic Air	Massachusetts			GAA	ATLANTIC AIR	Boston	1981	1984	Renamed BEX Business Express
Atlantic and Gulf Coast Airlines	South Carolina					Savannah-Hilton Head	1937	1937	
Atlantic Central Airlines	Maine					Bangor	1975	1976	Operated Beech 18
Atlantic City Airlines	New Jersey					Atlantic City	1965	1977	Renamed Southern Jersey Airways; Operated Twin Otters
Atlantic Coast Airlines	Virginia					Washington Dulles	1989	2006	Merged into Independence Air
Atlantic Coast Jet							1989	2003	Operated Dornier 328JET
Atlantic Gulf Airlines	Florida		ZY	AGF	ATLANTIC GULF	Tampa	1983	1986	
Atlantic North Airlines	New Hampshire		8M	SDD	SKY DANCE	Laconia	1993	1993	
Atlantic Northern Airlines	North Carolina						1947	1950	Originally Ocean Air Tradeways, later United States Overseas Airlines. Flew arms to Israel in 1948
Atlantic Seaboard Airlines	New Jersey					Bader Field	1960	1961	
Atlantic Southeast Airlines	Georgia		EV	ASQ	ACEY	Detroit	1979	2011	Merged into ExpressJet
Atlantis Airlines	North Carolina		SG	AAO	ATLANTIS AIR	Charlotte	1979	1991	Branded as Eastern Atlantis Express
ATO America Trans-Oceanic Company	Florida; New York					Miami; Long Island City	1920	1921	Acquired by Curtiss-Metropolitan Airplane Company
Atorie Air	Texas			PAV	ATORIE-AIR	El Paso	1983	1986	Founded as Pronto Aviation Services; Operated Douglas DC-3
ATX Air Services	Texas					Fort Worth Alliance	2013	2016	Rebranded to Hillwood Airways
Austin Express	Texas		7V	TXX	COWBOY	Austin-Bergstrom	1997	2000	
Austral Aviation	Wisconsin		AL	SYX		Milwaukee Mitchell	1994	2008	
Av Atlantic	Florida		G6	KYC	DOLPHIN	Fort Lauderdale–Hollywood	1991	1996	
AVAir	North Carolina					Raleigh Durham	1986	1989	Former American Eagle operator
Avalon Air Transport	California					Long Beach	1953	1963	
Avery Aviation	Wyoming					Greybull	1961	1969	Operated Consolidated Privateer, Cessna 180
Aviation Enterprises	Texas						1940	1947	Renamed Trans-Texas Airways
Aviation Services Inc.	Kansas					Wichita	1967	1969	Founded by Gary M. Adamson. Renamed Air Midwest
Aviex Jet	Texas					Houston	1979	1999	Operated Super King Air 200, Learjet 25, Aero Commander 1121 Jet Commander
Avolar	Nevada			VLX	AVOLAR	Las Vegas McCarran	2001	2002	
Aztec Air	Florida					Panama City	1967	1996	
Aztec Air	California					Long Beach	1989	1989	Charter carrier
Aztec Airlines	Texas					El Paso	1966	1967	
B
B & C Aviation	Tennessee					Nashville	1973	1999	Operated Learjet 24, Learjet 25
B Airways	Florida					Miami	1989	1990	Operated Douglas DC-3
B Airways Air Cargo	Florida					Miami	1997	1999	
B.A.S Airlines	Ohio					Youngstown–Warren	1981	1988	Founded as Skyline Motors Aviation
Bahamas Express	Florida					Miami	1987	1988	Established as Pacific Inter Air. Renamed Majestic Air
Baja Cortez Airlines	California		XT	BCA		Los Angeles	1977	1983	Operated BN Islander, Riley Turbo Skyliner
Bakersfield Aviation Services	California					Meadows Field	1973	1975	Operated Beech E18S, Beech Bonanza
Ball Brothers	Alaska					Anchorage	1977	1980	Fresh fish carrier
Baltia Air Lines	New York					New York Kennedy	1989	2018	Renamed USGlobal Airways
Baltimore Air Charter	Maryland					Baltimore–Washington	2004	2006	
Baltimore Airways	Maryland					Logan Field	1929	1930	
Baltimore Airways Company	Maryland					Park Heights, Baltimore	1929	1929	
Baltimore Helicopter Services	Maryland					Baltimore–Washington	2004	2015	Renamed GrandView Aviation
Bar Harbor Airlines	Maine		QO	AJC	BAR HARBOR	Bangor	1950	1971	Merged into Continental Express
Barnes and Gorst Air Mail	Washington					Seattle Lake Union Seaplane Base	1927	1927	
Barnhill & McGee Airways	Alaska					Anchorage	1931	1932	Forerunner of McGee Airways
Barr Air Transport	Alaska						1935	1938	Founded by Frank Barr
BAX Global	Florida		8W			Miami	1997	2011	Founded as Burlington Northern Airfreight then Burlington Air Express
Bay Valley Air Service	California					San Francisco	1947		
Bee Line	Connecticut						1923	1925	Renamed Colonial Air Transport
Beeson Aviation	Kansas					Concordia	1965	1968	Absorbed by Trans-Mo Airlines
Bellair	Alaska		7G			Anchorage	1980	2004	Operated Volpar Turboliner
Bellingham-Seattle Airways	Washington					Bellingham	1964	1969	Merged into Puget Sound Airlines
Bennett-Rodebaugh Company	Alaska						1927	1927	
Best Airlines	Kentucky		IW	BST	BESTWAY	Cincinnati/Northern Kentucky	1982	1986	
Biegert Aviation	Arizona					Chandler	1984	1993	Cargo carrier Operated Douglas C-54
Big Sky Airlines	Montana		GQ	BSY	BIG SKY	Billings Logan	1978	2008	
Bimini Island Air	Florida			BMY	BIMINI	Fort Lauderdale–Hollywood	1993	2011	AOC removed by the FAA in 2011
BizAir Shuttle	Ohio		UE			DuPage	2015	2015	Established as BizCharters; Operated Dornier 328, ERJ-135
Blackhawk Airways	Wisconsin		BB	BAK	BLACKHAWK	Southern Wisconsin	1970	1996	Operated Beech E18S
Blatz Airlines	California					Burbank	1947	1962	Operated DC-3, DC-4
Blatz Airlines	Nevada						1963	1963	Renamed Nevada Airlines. Formed Hawthorne-Nevada Airlines in 1964
Blue Dog	Washington					Omak	1968	1971	Commuter services Operated Aero Commander 560, Cessna 182
Blue Line Air Express	Wisconsin		4U			Medford	1982	1982	
Blue Moon Aviation	Minnesota					Minneapolis–Saint Paul	2003	2005	
Bluebell Aviation							1969	1973	Renamed Wrangler Aviation
Bluegrass Airlines	Kentucky					Bowling Green	1944	1946	
Bo-S-Aire				BAA	BOWMAN AIR		1979	1989	
Bob Harris Flying Service	Alaska					Bethel	1956	1975	Renamed Yute Air Alaska
Boeing Air Transport	Washington					Boeing Field	1927	1930	To United Airlines
Boise Aviation	Idaho					Boise	1967	1971	Third-level services
Bonanza Air Lines	Nevada		BL		BONANZA	North Las Vegas	1945	1968	Merged with Pacific Air Lines and West Coast Airlines to form Air West which was then renamed Hughes Airwest
Bonanza Airlines	Arizona			BON	BONAIR	Phoenix Sky Harbor	1978	1978	Established as Mountain West Airlines
Borrego Springs Airline	California					Borrego Valley	1968	1968	Renamed Sun Aire Lines
Boone County Airlines	Kentucky					Cincinnati/Northern Kentucky	1946	1950	
Boston Airport Corporation	Massachusetts					East Boston	1925	1926	Operated Travel Air
Boston Maine-Central Vermont Airways	Massachusetts					Boston	1933	1940	Formed by the merger of Boston Maine Airways and Central Vermont Airways
Boston-Maine Airways	Massachusetts					Boston	1931	1933	
Boston-Maine Airways	New Hampshire		E9	CXS	CLIPPER CONNECTION	Hanscom Field	1999	2008	
Bowen Air Lines	Texas					Dallas/Fort Worth	1930	1935	Acquired by Braniff Airways
Braniff International Airways	Texas		BN	BNF	BRANIFF	Dallas/Fort Worth	1930	1982	Went bankrupt, some assets sold to Braniff Inc.
Braniff (1983–1990)	Texas		BN	BNF	BRANIFF	Dallas/Fort Worth	1983	1990	Officially Braniff Inc. aka Braniff II; went bankrupt, assets sold to Braniff International Airlines, Inc.
Braniff (1991–1992)	Texas		BE			Dallas/Fort Worth	1991	1992	Officially Braniff International Airlines, Inc. aka Braniff III; went bankrupt
Branson Airlines	Florida		E5	BRN	BRANSON	Fort Lauderdale Executive	1992	1994	Founded as Dash Airlines renamed Eclipse Airlines
Bremerton Air Taxi	Washington					Bremerton	1964	1969	
Britt Airways	Indiana		RU	BTA	BRIT-AIR	Terre Haute	1956	1985	Founded as Vercoa Air Service. Merged into ExpressJet
Bristol Bay Air Service	Alaska					Bethel	1930	1943	Acquired by Ray Petersen Flying Service
Brockway Air	Vermont		SS	CVA	BROCKWAY	Burlington	1984	1989	Merged into Metro Airlines
Brooks Air Transport	Alaska					Fairbanks	1986	1986	Renamed Brools Fuel
Brooks Fuel	Alaska					Fairbanks	1986	2008	Founded as Brools Air Transport
Brower Airlines	Iowa		UD			Fort Madison	1968	1980	Founded as Brower Airways
Buckeye Air Service	Ohio					Cleveland Hopkins	1967	1971	
Budyer Air	Wyoming					Evanston	1981	1982	
Buffalo Airways	Texas		BV	BVA		Waco	1982	1996	Operated Boeing 707, Canadair CL-44, Douglas DC-8
Buker Airlines	Vermont					Hartness	1966	1968	Renamed Trans East Airlines
Burdett Air Lines	California					Los Angeles	1919	1927	Jack Frye merged with Aero Corporation and Standard Air Lines
Burlington Air Express	California		8W			Miami	1986	1997	Merged into BAX Global
Burlington Airways				BUR	BURLINGTON		1979	1982	
Burlington Northern Airfreight	Florida						1972	1985	Renamed Burlington Air Express
Business Express Airlines	Massachusetts		HQ	GAA	BIZEX	Boston	1982	2000	Merged into American Eagle Airlines
Byerly Airlines	Illinois					Jacksonville	1955	1961	
C
C & M Airlines	California			REM	REM	Inyokern	1979	1985	Renamed Indian Wells Airlines
C & R Connair	Connecticut						1967	1971	Scheduled commuter services
C-Air	California					Los Angeles	1964	1969	
Cable Commuter Airlines	California					Cable	1967	1969	Established as Cable Air Taxi. Acquired by Aero Commuter
Cal Aero Airways	California					Van Nuys	1969	1970	
Cal Jet Elite Air	California					McClellan–Palomar	2015	2018	
Cal Sierra Airlines	California					San Diego	1980	1981	
Calasia Air Transport	California					Oakland	1947	1950	Changed name to Overseas National Airways in 1950
California Air Charter	California					Lockheed Air Terminal	1946	1959	Originally Kesterson, founded in Knoxville, TN.
California Air Charter	California			CAC	CALAIR	Hollywood Burbank	1968	1971	Renamed Ameriflight
California Air Commuter	California			CLM	CALCOM	Oakland	1975	1979	Owned by Martin Aviation
California Air Freight	California						1959	1959	
California Air Shuttle	California					Oxnard	1990	1990	Operated Swearingen Metro
California Airways	California					Santa Monica	1979	1986	
California Arrow Airlines	California					Hollywood Burbank	1949	1949	Intrastate airline, subsidiary of Arrow Airways, suffered devastating crash that killed owner's wife and child
California Central Airlines	California					Hollywood Burbank	1949	1955	Intrastate airline slightly preceding Pacific Southwest Airlines. Assets bought in bankruptcy by Southwest Airways and Allegheny Airlines
California Eastern Airways	California					Oakland	1946	1960	Part 45 carrier that became a supplemental in 1959, only to transfer its certificate to President Airlines in 1960.
California Hawaiian Airlines	California						1952	1962	A dba of Airline Transport Carriers
California Pacific Airlines	California					Burbank	1950	1950	Short-lived California intrastate airline.
California Pacific (CalPac)	California					Los Angeles	1993	2005	To Mesa Airlines
California Pacific Airlines	California		4A	DYN	AERODYNAMICS	McClellan–Palomar	2018	2019	
California Seaboard Airlines	Arizona			SSB	CAL SEABOARD	Laughlin/Bullhead	1983	1986	
California Time Airlines	California					Hollywood Burbank	1963	1963	
Cal-State Airlines	California					Los Angeles	1968	1970	
CAM Air International	Florida		OX	FLM	BOXHAULER		1983	1986	Established as Fleming International Airways. Bought by Spirit of America Airlines
Canadian Colonial Airways	New York					New York Flushing	1928	1942	Operated flight to Montreal. Renamed Colonial Airlines
Canadian-American Airlines	Minnesota					Minneapolis	1929	1930	Merged with Arrowhead International Airlines; Operated Lockheed Vega, Travel Air 6000
Cape & Islands Air Freight	Massachusetts					Nantucket	?	2015	Division of Island Airlines
Cape & Islands Airline	Massachusetts					Hyannis Barnstable	1951	1970	To Air New England; Operated Beech 18, Twin Otter, Piper Navajo, Piper Aztec
Cape Smythe Air	Alaska		6C	CMY	CAPE SMYTHE AIR	Barrow	1975	2005	To Frontier Flying Service
Capital Airlines	Washington, D.C.		CA	CAP	CAPITOL	Washington National	1948	1961	Merged into United Airlines
Capital Cargo International Airlines	Florida		PT	CCI	CAPPY	Miami	1996	2013	Merged into ATI Air Transport International
Capitol Airlines	Kansas					Manhattan	1965	1989	Acquired by Allen Aviation. Operated as Braniff Express
Capitol Air	Tennessee		CL	CL	CAPITOL	Smyrna, Tennessee	1982	1984	Low cost carrier
Capitol Air Express	Virginia		C6	CEX	CAPITOL EXPRESS		1993	1996	Charter carrier founded by John Catsimatidis
Capitol Airways	Tennessee		CL	CL	CAPITOL	Wilmington, Delaware	1946	1967	Supplemental air carrier
Capitol International Airways	Tennessee		CL	CL	CAPITOL	Smyrna, Tennessee	1967	1982	Supplemental air carrier
Cardinal Airlines	Virginia		NN	CDA		Lynchburg	1968	1976	Renamed Air Virginia, Operated BN Islander, Beech 99
Cargo 360	Washington		GG	GGC	LONGHAUL	Seattle–Tacoma	2005	2008	To Southern Air
Caribair	Puerto Rico					San Juan	1939	1973	Merged into Eastern Airlines
Caribbean American Lines								1956	Irregular air carrier shut by CAB in 1956 for flying scheduled service
Caribbean Express	Florida					Miami	1983	1988	Operated Embraer Bandeirante, Cessna 402B
Caribbean Sun	Florida					Miami	2002	2007	To World Atlantic Airlines
Carnival Air Lines	Florida		KW	CAA	CARNIVAL AIR	Fort Lauderdale–Hollywood	1988	1998	Merged into Pan Am (1996), to Boston-Maine Airways
Cascade Airways	Washington		CZ	CCD	CASCADE	Seattle-Tacoma	1969	1986	
Casino Express Airlines	Nevada		XP	CXP	CASINO EXPRESS	Las Vegas McCarran	1987	2005	Rebranded as Xtra Airways
Catalina Air Lines	California			CAI	CATALINA	Long Beach	1963	1967	Avalon Air Transport (1953), then Catalina Air Lines (1963), acquired by Golden West Airlines
Catalina Air Transport	California					Santa Catalina Island	1931	1942	Founded as Wilmington-Catalina Airline in 1931. Renamed Catalina Air Transport in 1941. Contracted with United Air Lines to operate to Catalina 1946–1954.
Catalina Channel Airlines	California					Pebble Beach	1959	1966	Founded by Bob Hanley. Used seaplane
Catlin Aviation	Oklahoma			CLN	CATLIN	Durant Eaker Field	1969	1969	Commuter services
Catskill Airways	New York		KF	CSK	CATSKILL	Utica	1966	1989	Merged into Mohawk Airlines
CCAir	North Carolina		ED	CDL	CAROLINA	Charlotte Douglas	1987	2002	
Centennial Airlines	Wyoming		BE	CNL	WYO-AIR	Laramie	1981	1987	Merged into Mesa Airlines
Cen-Tex Airlines	Texas			CTX	CEN-TEX		1981	1983	Commuter services
Central Airlines (1934)	Virginia					Washington National	1934	1936	Merged into Pennsylvania Airlines. Operated Stinson Model A
Central Airlines	Texas					Dallas Love Field	1949	1967	Merged into Frontier Airlines (1950–1986)
Central American Airways	Kentucky					Louisville	1946; 1963	1948; 1973	Irregular air carrier in 1940s. Uncertificated carrier from 1963. Became Central American International
Central American International	Kentucky					Louisville	1973	1982	Uncertificated carrier, follow on from Central American Airways. Became Trans International Airlines (1985–1989)
Central Iowa Airlines	Iowa					Davenport	1973	1973	Operated DC-3
Central State Airlines	Ohio					Cleveland Shea Field	1989	1990	Operated BAe Jetstream
Centurion Air Cargo	Florida		WE	CWC	CHALLENGE CARGO	Miami	1985	2018	Formerly known as Challenge Air Cargo
Century 2000							1971	1973	
Century Airlines	Michigan					Oakland County	1973	1996	Established as S.S. Airways
Century Airlines	California					Arcata–Eureka	1977	1981	Established as Six Rivers Air Service
Century Pacific Air Lines	California					Los Angeles	1931	1932	To American Airways
CF Airfreight			CK			Indianapolis	1985	1989	Air freight forwarder and virtual airline. A predecessor to Emery Worldwide Airlines
CHA California Hawaiian							1946	1962	see California Hawaiian Airlines.
Chalk’s Flying Service	Florida					Miami	1919	1936	Renamed Chalk's International Airlines; Operated Stinson Voyager with floats
Chalk's International Airlines	Florida		BK	CHK	CHALKS	Miami Seaplane Base	1996	1996	Established as Red Arrow Flying Service in 1917; Operated DHC-7 Dash 7, Grumman Albatross, Grumman Mallard
Chalk’s Ocean Airways	Florida		OP	CHK		Miami	1999	2005	Renamed Chalk's International Airlines; Operated Beech 1900D, Grumman G-73 Mallard, Saab 340A
Challenge Air Cargo	Florida		WE	CWC	CHALLENGE CARGO	Miami	1985	2001	Charter airline
Challenge Air International	Florida		VV	OFF	CHALLENGE AIR	Miami	1984	1987	Former Challenge International Airlines
Challenger Airlines (1946)	Utah					Salt Lake City	1946	1946	Utah intrastate airline, same parent company as Challenger Airlines
Challenger Airlines	Wyoming					Laramie, Wyoming, Salt Lake City, Denver	1947	1950	Merged with Monarch Air Lines and Arizona Airways to form Frontier Airlines (1950–1986)
Champion Air	Minnesota		MG	CCP	CHAMPION AIR	Minneapolis–Saint Paul	1995	2008	Formed from MGM Grand Air
Channel Air Lift	Hawaii					Honolulu	1967	1969	Went bankrupt
Chapman Air				EXR	EXPRESS COURIER		1978	1985	Renamed Flight Express, Inc.
Chapparal Airlines	Texas		FC	CPL	CHAPPARAL	Abilene	1975	1990	Merged into Metro Airlines
Charter Air Transport	Ohio		VC			Cleveland Hopkins	1997	2015	Renamed Via Airlines
Charter Airlines	Florida					Gainesville	1977	1979	Established as Charterair Commuter Airline. Merged into Mackey International Airlines. Operated Convair 580
Charter One Airlines	Michigan					Detroit	1980	1992	Renamed Spirit Airlines
Charterair Commuter Airlines	Florida		HO		CITRUS	Gainesville	1977	1979	Renamed Charter Air Center
Chatham Airlines							1964	1970	Established as Lemco Flying Services
Chautauqua Airlines	Indiana		RP	CHQ	CHAUTAUQUA	Chicago O'Hare	1973	2014	To Shuttle America
Cherokee Airlines									
Cherokee Airtaxi	Florida				CITRUS	Athens Ben Epps	1968	1971	
Chesapeake Airways	Maryland					Salisbury–Ocean City	1946	1965	Merged into Metro Airlines
Chicago Air	Illinois		CH	CHGO	WILDONION	Chicago Midway	1985	1986	
Chicago Airways	Illinois					Chicago O'Hare	1959	1961	
Chicago and Southern Air Lines	California		CS	CSA		Peoria Downing	1933	1953	As Pacific Seaboard Air Lines, rebranded Chicago and Southern Air Lines (1935), merged with Delta Air Lines
Chicago Express Airlines	Illinois		C8	WDY	WINDY CITY	Chicago Midway	1993	2005	
Chicago Helicopter Airways	Illinois					Chicago O'Hare	1954	1965	Established as Helicopter Air Service
Chippewa Air Commuter	Michigan			CPW	CHIPPEWA-AIR	Manistee	1977	1978	
Christiansen Air Service	Alaska					Anchorage	1956	1956	Acquired by Cordova Airlines
Christler Flying Services	New York			CHR	CHRISTLER		1970	1979	Aerial spraying
Christler-Avery Aviation	Wyoming					Greybull	1951	1961	Founded by Mel Christler and Morris Avery. Operated B-18 Bolo, B-25 Mitchell, Northrop Delta
Christman Air System	Pennsylvania		SX	CAS	CHRISTMAN	Washington County	1977	1991	
Cimarron Aire	Oklahoma			CMN		McAlester	2004	2006	
CitationAir	Connecticut			FIV	FIVE STAR	White Plains	1998	2014	
CityLink Airlines				HSR	HOOSIER		2001	2002	
Clearwater Flying Service	Idaho			CFS		Orofino	1977	1977	Renamed Empire Airlines
Cleveland-Detroit Air Line	Ohio					Cleveland Hopkins	1927	1928	
Clifford Ball Airline	Pennsylvania					Bettis Field	1927	1930	Acquired by Pennsylvania Airlines
Clinton Aero	New York		SS	CVA	CLINCO	Plattsburgh	1971	1984	Merged with Air North to form Brockway Air
Coastal Air	Georgia					Atlanta	1975	1976	Renamed Southeastern Commuter Airlines
Coastal Air Freight									Operated Fokker Super Universal
Coastal Air Lines	California					San Francisco	1947	1962	Began as Coastal Cargo. Its certificate was taken over by Zantop Air Transport
Coastal Airlines	Florida					St. Petersburg–Clearwater	1968	1969	
Coastal Airlines	Rhode Island					Warwick	1983	1989	Began as National Air
Coastal Airways	Washington		PN	SQV	COASTAL AIR	Sequim Valley	1982	1992	Operated commuter service
Coastal Plains Commuter	South Carolina					Hilton Head	1978	1979	
Cochise Airlines	Arizona		DP			Tucson	1971	1982	
Coker Airfreight	Texas					Dallas Fort Worth	1969	1984	Renamed Skyfreighters. Operated DC-3
Coleman Air Transport	Illinois					Chicago Rockford	1977	1980	Founded by Philip Coleman.
Colgan Air	Tennessee		9L	CJC	COLGAN	Memphis	1991	2012	Established an FBO (1965), flights began 1970, sold to Presidential Airways (1986), restarted as National Capital (1991), merged to Pinnacle Airlines
Colonial Air Transport	New York					New York-LaGuardia	1926	1930	To American Airlines
Colonial Airlines	New Jersey					New York-LaGuardia	1928	1956	Established as Canadian Colonial Airways, merged into Eastern Air Lines
Colonial Western Airways	New York					Albany	1927	1929	
Colorado Airlines	Colorado					Crested Butte	1977	1979	Known as Crested Butte Air Service
Columbia Air	Virginia					Washington National	1981	1982	
Columbia Pacific Airlines	Washington		7C			Seattle-Tacoma	1977	2002	Established as Execuair in 1971
Columbus Airlines	Florida					Fort Lauderdale–Hollywood	1995	1996	Established as Liberty Airways
Colvin Air Charter	Georgia					Athens Ben Epps	1999	2004	
Comair	Kentucky		OH	COM	COMAIR	Cincinnati/Northern Kentucky; Orlando	1977	2012	Shut down by parent company Delta Air Lines
Comair Jet Express	Kentucky					Cincinnati/Northern Kentucky	2000	2001	Delta Air Lines subsidiary
Comanche Air	Washington					Ephrata	2000	2001	
Combs Airways	Colorado					Denver	1957	1984	Began as Combs Freightair
Command Air	North Dakota						1966	1969	Merged into Red Baron Airlines
Command Airways	New York		DD	CMD	COMMAND	Hudson Valley	1965	1988	Renamed Flagship Airlines
Commutair	Texas					Houston Bush	1978	1980	
Commutaire International Airways	Florida					Miami	1976	1977	
Commute Air	Washington					Spokane	1967	1968	
Commuter Airlines	New York					Greater Binghamton	1964	1984	Established as Broome County Aviation
Commuter Airlines	Iowa					Sioux City	1965	1971	
Compass Airlines	Minnesota		CP	CPZ	COMPASS	Minneapolis–Saint Paul	2006	2020	Shutdown due to travel disruptions caused by the COVID-19 pandemic
Concord Airlines	New Jersey						1970	1971	Third-level services
Concord International Airlines	Florida						1980	1982	Established as Jet Freight Cargo
Connectair	California			CCR	CONNECTAIR	Santa Barbara	1980	1984	
Conner Air Lines	Florida		CS			Miami	1948	1992	Operated C-46, DC-3, DC-6, DC-8
Connie Kalitta Services	Michigan			CKS	CONNIE	Cincinnati/Northern Kentucky	1967	1984	To American International Airways
Conquest Airlines	Texas		5C	CAC	CONQUEST	San Antonio	1986	1997	Acquired by Air L.A.
Conquest Sun Airlines	Georgia					Atlanta	1993	1994	Renamed AirTran Airways
Consairway	California					Fairfield, California; San Diego	1942	1945	Division of Convair. Military contract airline, flew double-daily to Australia, then New Guinea, then beyond with converted B-24s
Continental Air Services, Inc	Nevada					Los Angeles	1965		A subsidiary of Continental Airlines
Continental Airlines	Texas		CO	COA	CONTINENTAL	Houston Bush	1937	2010	Merged into United Airlines
Continental Charters	Florida					Miami	1945	1954	Irregular air carrier bankrupt 1954, then bought for $20 after which CAB refused to allow it to operate
Continental Connection						Cleveland Hopkins		2010	Included Cape Air, Colgan Air, CommutAir and Silver Airways, merged with United Express
Continental Express	Texas		CO		Continental Express	Cleveland Hopkins	1986	2010	Operations absorbed by United Express on merger of parent companies
Continental Lite						Cleveland Hopkins	1993	1995	Airline within an airline, brand of Continental Airlines
Continental Micronesia	Guam		CS	CMI	AIR MIKE	Guam	1968	2010	Founded as Air Micronesia. Subsidiary of Continental Airlines until 2010; subsidiary of UCH until 2017 when it was officially merged into United Airlines
Continental Sky-Van	Texas					Dallas	1946	1946	irregular air carrier
Continental West	Texas		CO			Los Angeles	1985	1986	New division of Texas Air Corporation
Contract Air Cargo	Michigan			TSU	TRANSAUTO	Oakland County	1983	2005	Rebranded as Gulf and Caribbean Cargo
Cook Inlet Aviation	Alaska			CKA	COOK-AIR	Homer	1989		Renamed Inlet Airlines
Copper State Airlines	Arizona			ROD	ROADRUNNER	Douglas	1980	1982	
Coral Air	United States Virgin Islands		VY	VYK		Saint Croix	1980	1985	Acquired the operation of Eastern Caribbean Airlines. Operated GAF Nomad, Embraer Bandeirante, Twin Otter
Cordova Airlines	Alaska					Cordova	1934	1968	Acquired by Alaska Airlines
Coronado Flyers	California						1975	1981	Operated DC-3
Corporate Air Fleet	Tennessee			CTX	CATBIRD	Nashville	1978	1998	
Corporate Airlines	Tennessee		3C	CEA	CORP X	Smyrna	1996	2007	Renamed as Corporate Airlines in 1997. Changed name to RegionsAir in 2004.
Corporate Express Airlines	Tennessee					Nashville	1996	1998	Renamed Corporate Airlines
Cortland Air Company	Ohio					Youngstown–Warren	2003	2009	
Cosmopolitan Airlines	New York					Republic	1978	1980	
Cromwell Air Lines	Texas					Dallas Love Field	1929	1931	Operated Stinson Aircraft Company
Cross Sound Commuter	Washington					Seattle–Tacoma	1970	1974	
Crown Airways	Pennsylvania			CRO	CROWN AIRWAYS	DuBois	1969	1994	Began as Allegheny Commuter, to Mesa Airlines
Cryderman Air Service	Michigan					Oakland County	1977	1978	
Crystal Air Aviation	California					Van Nuys	2007	2012	Renamed Fuga Air Charter
Crystal Shamrock Airlines	Minnesota			CYT	CRYSTAL AIR	Minneapolis Crystal	1972	1991	
Cumberland Airlines	Maryland		NQ			Greater Cumberland	1969	1988	Established as Nicholson Air Services
Curtiss Flying Service	Massachusetts					Boston	1929	1932	Operated amphibious aircraft
Curtiss Metropolitan Airplane Company	Florida					Miami-Opa Locka	1921	1924	Established as America Trans-Oceanic Company. Newspaper deliveries
Custom Air Transport	Florida		5R	CTT	CATT	Fort Lauderdale–Hollywood	1985	2008	
Cutter Flying Service	New Mexico					Albuquerque	1969	1969	

== See also ==
- List of airlines of the United States
- List of airports in the United States
- List of defunct airlines of Guam
- List of defunct airlines of Puerto Rico
- List of defunct airlines of the United States Virgin Islands
