= Bizjet (disambiguation) =

A bizjet, or business jet, is a jet aircraft designed for transporting small groups of people.

Bizjet may also refer to:

- Hamlin Jet, ICAO airline code HJL, callsign BIZJET
- Bizjet Ltd, ICAO airline code BIZ, callsign BIZZ

== See also ==
- United BizJet Holding, or Avolar (UAL Corporation subsidiary), a defunct subsidiary of United Airlines
