= Challenger Airlines (1946) =

Short-lived 1946 Utah intrastate airline

- Founded: 1945; 80 years ago
- Commenced operations: 4 March 1946; 79 years ago
- Ceased operations: 9 November 1946; 78 years ago
- Operating bases: Salt Lake City, Utah
- Parent company: Claude Neon
- Headquarters: Salt Lake City, Utah; United States
- Key people: George W. Snyder Jr. (Founder)

Challenger Airlines was a Utah intrastate airline, a scheduled United States airline that operated from Salt Lake City in 1946. It had the same parent company (but was a distinct corporation from) the local service carrier Challenger Airlines that operated from 1947 to 1950, when it merged with two other local service carriers to form the first Frontier Airlines.

== History ==
Challenger Airlines was incorporated in Nevada in 1945 by George W. Snyder, Jr. to apply for certification from the Civil Aeronautics Board (CAB) to fly Utah routes as a local service carrier. The CAB was a now defunct Federal agency that, at the time, tightly regulated almost all air transportation in the United States. Snyder came from a wealthy mining family and had a background in aviation. Local service carriers were a class of airline the CAB certificated in the late 1940s and early 1950s to fly smaller routes in the United States. Snyder was backed in Challenger's application to the CAB by Claude Neon, the company that introduced and popularized neon signs, based on the patents of French engineer Georges Claude.

To demonstrate it could operate an airline, on 4 March 1946 Challenger started flying Beech 18 aircraft as a Utah intrastate airline, a form of carrier that did not require CAB approval (but also did not come with subsidy, which the US govt, at the time, paid to all local service airlines). However, in the same month, the CAB rendered its decisions about what airlines got the Rocky Mountain area routes, including Utah, and Challenger was not included. The airline also applied for routes in the Arizona-New Mexico case, those later won by Arizona Airways, but by the time the CAB ruled in that case, this version of Challenger was defunct.

Challenger continued to fly scheduled service within Utah, as well as charter flights outside of Utah, and continued to press the CAB for certification. Service was popular: Challenger had a 64% load factor in the first 17 weeks of operation, far higher than local service carriers at the time. It did, however, stop flying interstate charter routes to conform with CAB guidance. But on 9 November Challenger ceased operations, saying it believed continued operation would hurt its chance of gaining CAB certification. Snyder and Claude Neon then sold the company, taking the name with them. In early 1947 Snyder, still backed by Claude Neon, purchased Wyoming-based Summit Airways, a local service carrier the CAB had certificated for the Rocky Mountain routes (but had yet to fly), renaming it Challenger Airlines and starting operation later that year.
