= Air Carolina =

Regional Airline

Air Carolina (Florence Airlines)
IATA	ICAO	Call sign
FN	—	—
- Founded: 1967; 59 years ago
- Ceased operations: 1980; 46 years ago
- Fleet size: 6
- Destinations: 6
- Headquarters: Florence, South Carolina
- Key people: Sheffield P. Wilds; William E. Smith

Air Carolina, originally known as Florence Airlines, was an American regional airline initially based in Florence, South Carolina, with piston aircraft service within the Carolinas and Georgia. The company was originally certified as Florence Airlines, on December 5, 1967, by Sheffield P. Wilds, who was the airline's first president.

== History ==
In 1973, Florence Airlines was operating three daily scheduled passenger and cargo flights between Florence, South Carolina, and Charlotte, North Carolina, with a fleet of one Aero Commander 500B and two Piper Cherokee Sixes. Between 1973 and 1976, they also used a Piper Cherokee 140 for pilot training purposes.

By early 1975, William E. Smith had become president of the airline, and had added one Piper Cherokee Arrow to their fleet, but service had been reduced to just twice daily passenger service between Florence, South Carolina, and Charlotte, North Carolina.

On March 30, 1975, the airline began operating under the name Air Carolina, and served Atlanta, Georgia, Greenwood, South Carolina, Anderson, South Carolina, and Charlotte, North Carolina, using Piper Navajo Chieftains, Britten Norman Islanders, and a single Twin Otter.

By 1981, their passenger service was operating between Charlotte, Hickory, North Carolina, and Florence. Its fleet then consisted of two Piper Navajo Chieftains, one Piper Navajo, one Piper Aztec, one Piper Seneca, and one Piper Lance.

The airline was later absorbed by Atlantis Airlines in 1980.

== Destinations ==
- Gilbert Field (FLO), Florence, South Carolina (from 1973)
- Charlotte Douglas International Airport (CLT), Charlotte, North Carolina (from 1973)
- Atlanta, Georgia (by 1975)
- Greenwood, South Carolina (from March 30, 1975)
- Anderson, South Carolina (by 1975)
- Hickory Regional Airport (HKY), Hickory, North Carolina (by 1981)

== Fleet ==
Over the duration of its operations, Florence Airlines and Air Carolina utilized numerous aircraft, with a preference for Piper Aircraft models:

- 1 - Aero Commander 500B
- 2 - Piper Cherokee Six
- 3 - Piper Navajo Chieftain — N59820, N59982, N27677
- 1 - Piper Navajo — N165YS, N16JK, N9192Y
- 1 - Piper Cherokee 140 — N56821
- 1 - Britten Norman Islander — N30BN - STOL capable twin prop
- 1 - de Havilland Canada DHC-6 Twin Otter - STOL capable twin turbopropN300SP
- 1 - Piper Navajo
- 1 - Piper AztecN2SB
- 1 - Piper Seneca — N55321
- 1 - Piper LanceN9797C

== See also ==
- List of defunct airlines of the United States
