= Canyon Island =

Island in Alaska, United States

Native name: Aanx̱'atinyé
- Interactive map of Canyon Island

Geography
- Location: Juneau City and Borough, Alaska
- Coordinates: 58°32′53″N 133°40′32″W
- Archipelago: Alexander Archipelago
- Width: 0.8 mi (1.3 km)
- Highest elevation: 69 ft (21 m)

Administration
- United States
- State: Alaska
- Borough: Juneau

Canyon Island (Lingít: Aanx̱'atinyé) is an island in the City and Borough of Juneau, Alaska, United States. Located in the Taku River, it is 2.5 miles (4.0 km) northeast of the mouth of the Wright River and 32 miles (51 km) northeast of the city of Juneau.

The island is 0.8 miles (1.3 km) across.

== History ==
The Taku people previously lived on the island. A radio station operated by Pacific Alaska Airways was located on the island as of the 1930s.

The Alaska Department of Fish and Game operated a research station on the island. Fish wheels are present on the island for the study of salmon.
