= Trans East Airlines =

US airline

IATA	ICAO	Call sign
-	-	-
- Founded: 1965; 61 years ago
- Ceased operations: 1971; 55 years ago
- Operating bases: Manchester–Boston Regional Airport
- Fleet size: 11

Trans East Airlines was an airline that was based in Manchester, New Hampshire, and in New York City during the 1960s. It ceased its operations in 1972. Trans East Airlines was the fixed-base operator (FBO) at Bangor International Airport in Bangor, Maine, beginning in 1968.

== History ==
Trans East Airlines was formed in 1963 as Statewide Airlines, by two brothers, Norman Kaye and Harvey Kaye. Also in 1963, this airlines was issuing stock under the name, Trans-East Air Inc. Trans East Airlines operated scheduled commuter services from LaGuardia Airport and John F. Kennedy International Airport to Albany, New York; Bangor, Maine; Bedford, Massachusetts; Fitchburg, Massachusetts; Manchester, New Hampshire; Portland, Maine; and Lebanon, New Hampshire. Trans East Airlines also operated the airports at Bethel, New York, and Bangor, Maine. Their head office was at 555 Fifth Avenue, New York, New York. In late 1968 Trans East discontinued their scheduled commuter services, and focused on their fixed-base operator position at Bangor International Airport. At that point, they were renamed Trans East Air International.

== Bangor International Airport ==
In one of his biggest promotional coups, Norman Kaye took out a full-page ad in The New York Times headlined: “Can Bangor, Maine, answer New York’s air congestion problem?” Not only did Kaye explain why that was the case, he also flew 100 major airline executives to Bangor International Airport to inspect the airport. The tactic garnered national attention and prompted a closer look through a Newsweek magazine article in 1970.

Trans East Airlines took over the refueling and general aviation business at Bangor International Airport after the military abandoned Dow Air Force Base in 1968. Though Trans East Airlines still had financial commitments in New Hampshire, it quickly established Bangor, Maine as a key Atlantic Coast airport for supplemental air carriers. Scheduled air carriers used Bangor International Airport as an alternate stop for refueling and other services.

== Executives ==
In 1969, the executives of Trans East Airlines were:

- President: Walter S. Blandford
- Vice Presidents: Harvey Kaye and Edwin W. Breed
- Operations Director: Captain D. Brown

== Stewardesses ==
In spring 1968, there was a need for mini-stewardesses, also known as mini-stews, for Trans East Airlines, as the cabin height of the Twin Otter aircraft was limited. Stewardesses had to be five ft (150 cm) tall or shorter to work on the specially designed short-haul aircraft.

== Fleet ==
During 1968, the Trans East Airlines fleet of aircraft consisted of:

- 6 DHC-6 Twin Otter
- 2 Beechcraft Model 18
- 1 Piper Aztec
- 2 Piper Cherokee 180

== See also ==
- List of defunct airlines of the United States

== Fictional References ==
Trans East Airlines was the fictional airline used in the 1961 Twilight Zone episode "The Arrival".
