= Trans International Airlines (1985–1989) =

US charter airline (1973–1989) that set a labor precedent

Trans International Airlines Central American International
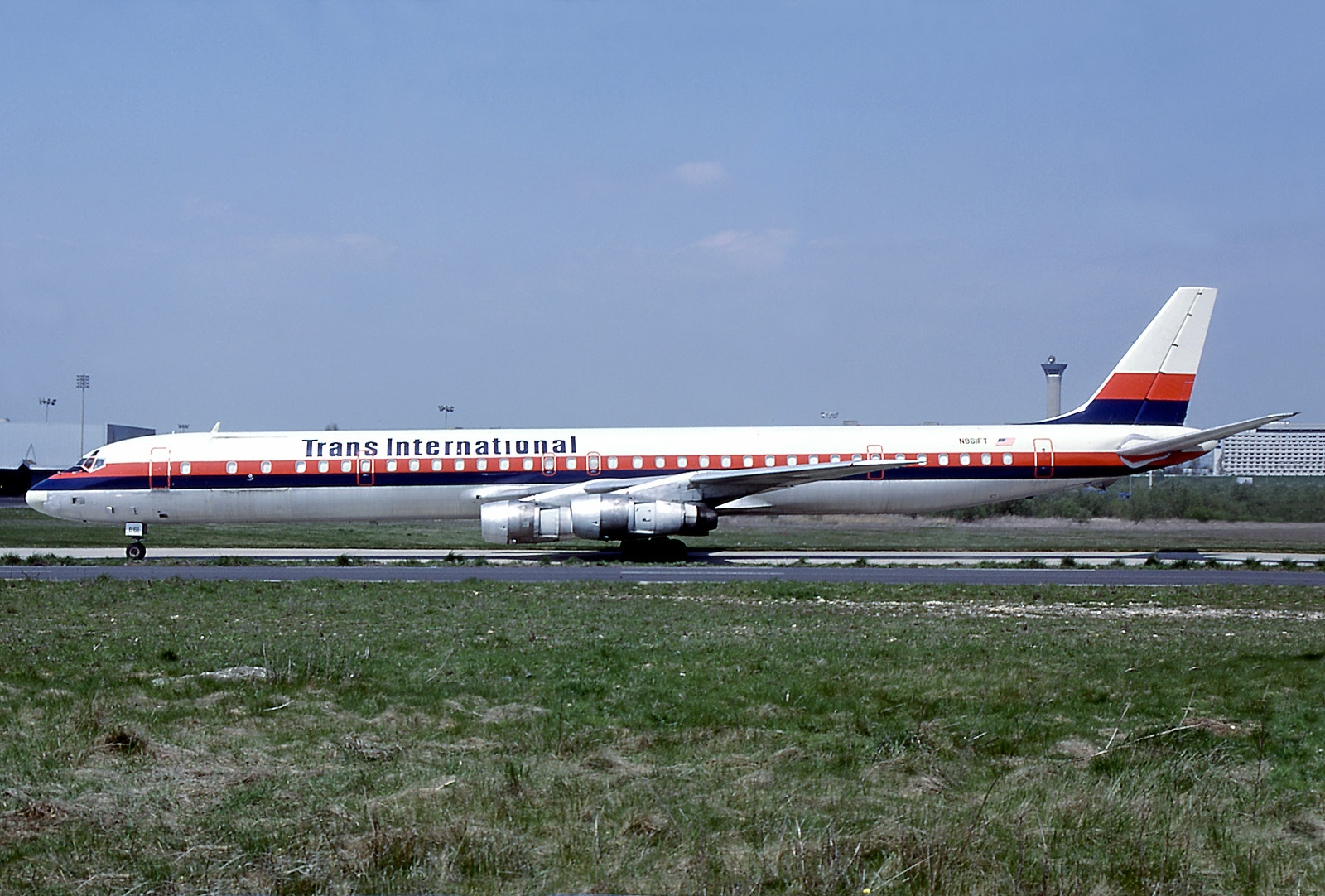
- DC-8-61CF Paris 1985
IATA	ICAO	Call sign
LP	TIA; CAA	Trans International; CENAM
- Founded: 17 July 1973 incorporated in Kentucky as Central American International
- Ceased operations: 1989
- Operating bases: Orlando, Florida; Louisville, Kentucky
- Fleet size: See Fleet below
- Parent company: Transamerica Corporation (1984–1987)
- Headquarters: Orlando, Florida; Louisville, Kentucky
- Key people: William Hardenstine; Robert P. Fleming
- Founder: Wilbur L. Paris

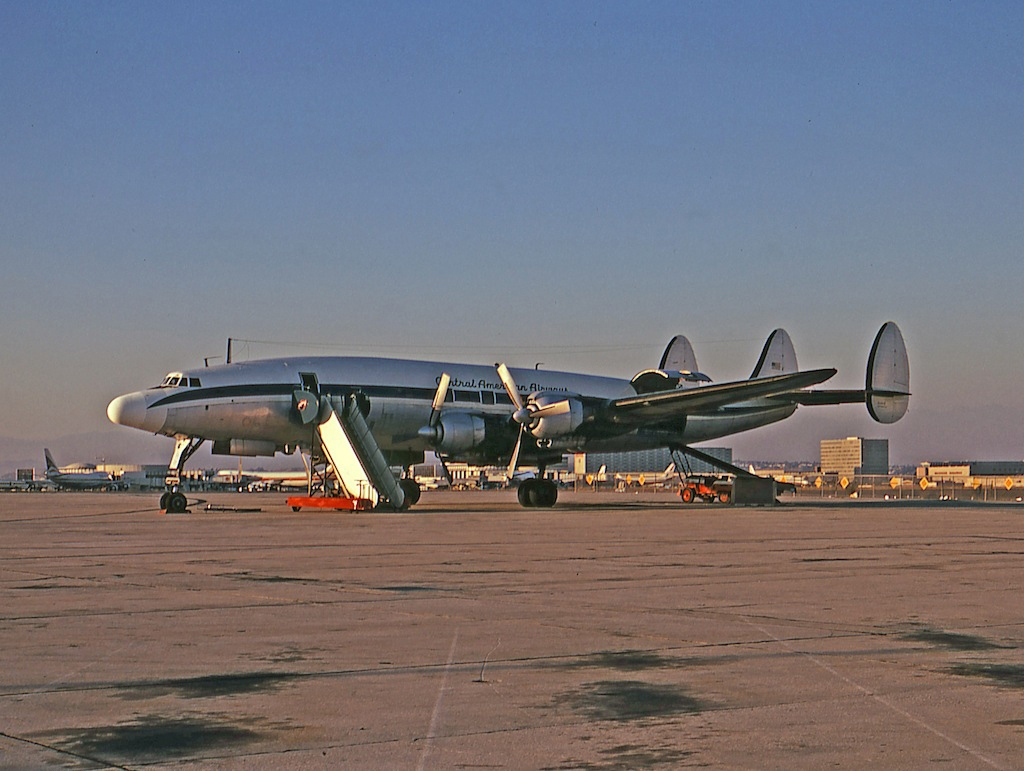
Central American Airways Super Constellation Los Angeles 1972

Trans International Airlines (TIA) was the second airline of that name owned by Transamerica Corporation, which established the second TIA in 1984, building this non-union carrier while de-emphasizing a unionized subsidiary, Transamerica Airlines, which, until 1979, had itself been called Trans International Airlines. But in early 1986, as part of a restructuring, Transamerica Corporation put both airlines up for sale. An investor group bought TIA in 1987, while Transamerica Airlines was liquidated in 1986.

While this second TIA ceased operations in 1989, it had a lasting impact on the US airline industry because a federal appeals court confirmed the government was not required to impose labor protective provisions (LPPs) in approving its acquisition by Transamerica Corporation. LPPs were a routine part of airline acquisitions in the regulated era that ended 1978, but the court said that since Congress, in passing the 1978 Airline Deregulation Act, sought to expose the industry to market forces, the CAB could interpret this as not requiring LPPs. Thus Transamerica Corporation was free to establish a non-union airline subsidiary alongside a union airline subsidiary.

== History ==
=== Central American International and Central American Airways ===
The second TIA had its origins in Central American International (CAI), an uncertificated carrier founded by Wilbur L. Paris in 1973 in Louisville, Kentucky. CAI was, in turn, a continuation of earlier airline activity by Paris under the name Central American Airways (CAA). CAA was originally an irregular air carrier, dating to 1946, but gave up airline operations in 1948. In the 1950s it started an air taxi and in 1963 became an uncertificated carrier (i.e. operating not as a common carrier). See External links for a photo of a CAA Martin 2-0-2.

CAI was one of a number of aviation enterprises of Wilbur Paris, including a fixed base operator (FBO). CAI focused on cargo, including operating for Federal Express 1975–1978. In 1978 it started scheduled freight service with a DC-6. CAI was also one of many small operators flying auto parts for Air Transport Services Corp., one of two organizations (the other was Zantop International Airlines) arranging air transport of auto parts for the Big Three automakers in the mid-1970s. In 1981, the Civil Aeronautics Board (CAB) certificated CAI as a passenger charter airline; at the time of its application to the CAB, CAI operated a Convair 880 freighter. See External links for a photo. However, CAI ceased operations in 1982.

=== Transamerica Corporation ===
In 1968 Transamerica Corporation bought supplemental air carrier Trans International Airlines from future billionaire Kirk Kerkorian. The carrier operated under that name until 1979, when it changed to Transamerica Airlines.

In 1984, Transamerica Corporation bought then-dormant CAI to revive the name Trans International Airlines to fly, initially, cargo, but eventually passenger charters as well. Transamerica Airlines made record profits in 1983, but its passenger operations, scheduled and charter, accounting for 36% of revenues, made a loss and the airline had undertaken a "partial liquidation", selling three DC-10 aircraft. Transamerica Corporation denied it would transfer business from Transamerica Airlines to the new TIA but that was not how the Air Line Pilots Association (ALPA) saw it. Transamerica said it was losing substantial business to lower cost operators and approached its unions for concessions. The unions offered concessions in exchange for killing the CAI deal; Transamerica Corporation declined. The unions asked the CAB to impose labor protective provisions (LPPs) as part of the acquisition of CAI. These were routine in the regulated era that ended in 1978, but the CAB declined to impose them, saying that, consistent with the desire of Congress in the 1978 Airline Deregulation Act, it intended to allow market forces to work. The unions sued to overturn this decision, but a federal appeals court ruled against them, thus confirming the ability of a company to have both union and non-union airline subsidiaries.

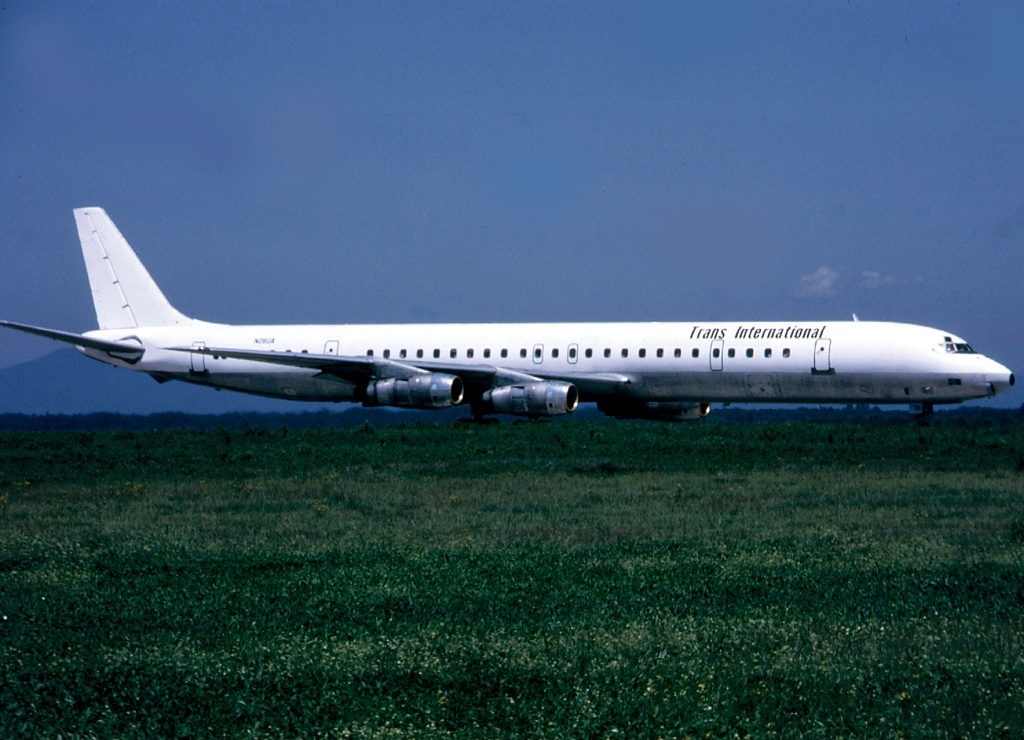
DC-8-61 at Milan 1988

The name change from CAI to TIA was effective 26 October 1984 and first flight was early in 1985. The CAI version of TIA moved to Orlando International Airport where it operated DC-8s (see photo above) and Lockheed L-188 Electras (see External links for an Electra photo). In early 1986, Transamerica Corporation announced its intention to divest remaining non-financial subsidiaries, including Transamerica Airlines, Trans International Airlines, Budget Rent-A-Car and industrial manufacturing firm Transamerica Delaval. Transamerica Airlines shut down on September 30, but Trans International Airlines was sold as a going concern in July 1987 to TIA Invest Co, Inc., at which time its president was William Hardenstine. In June 1988, Robert P. Fleming, previously associated with Fleming International Airways, became president, CEO and chair.

The airline went out of business in 1989. The FAA shows the carrier in operation at year-end 1988, but Kentucky corporate records show an involuntary dissolution later that year.

== Fleet ==
Central American Airways, year-end 1965:

- 1 Douglas DC-3
- 1 Martin 2-0-2

Central American Airways, year-end 1972:

- 1 Douglas DC-3
- 1 Lockheed L-749 Constellation
- 1 Lockheed L-1049 Super Constellation
- 1 Martin 2-0-2

Central American International, year-end 1977:

- 1 Douglas DC-3
- 1 Lockheed L-1049 Super Constellation

As related in the text, in 1981 Central American International operated a Convair 880 freighter.

Trans International Airlines year-end 1987:

- 7 DC-8
- 3 Lockheed L-188 Electra

== Accident ==
- 10 September 1965: Shortly after takeoff from Bowman Field, Central American Airways Douglas DC-3 N272R, empty on a flight to pick up cargo in Dayton, collided with Cessna 150 N4564U flown by a student pilot. The Cessna crashed, killing the pilot, while N272R was able to return to the field. The student pilot had not received clearance to be where he was.

== Legacy ==
As of 2025, Central American Airways continues to operate as a fixed base operator at Bowman Field in Louisville. That company's website notes the 70 year heritage of the company.

== See also ==
- Trans International Airlines
- List of defunct airlines of the United States
