= IFL Group =

Airline of the United States

IFL Group Inc. Gulf & Caribbean Cargo
IATA	ICAO	Call sign
IF -	TSU; IFL	TRANSAUTO; EIFFEL
- Founded: 1983; 43 years ago
- Headquarters: Waterford, Michigan, United States
- Website: iflgroup.com

IFL Group Inc. is a cargo airline based in Waterford, Michigan, United States.

== History ==
Old logo from 2014 until 2024.

IFL Group has purchased four CRJ200s for cargo operations, making IFL the first company in the world to use the CRJ airframe exclusively for cargo operations.

== See also ==
- List of airlines of the United States
