= Century Airlines pilots' strike =

1932 airline pilot strike

The Century Air Lines Strike of 1932 was a strike of pilots from Chicago-based Century Air Lines following a proposal in early February by company owner Errett Lobban Cord to cut wages by up to 40%. The two-month strike was the first in the history of the fledgling commercial aviation industry and also the first significant action for the year-old Air Line Pilots Association (ALPA) which represented the 23 striking pilots. Political agitation in the form of congressional hearings and public condemnations eventually forced Cord to relent and sell Century Airlines on April 2 to the Aviation Corporation (AVCO), parent company of American Airways.

The strike highlighted the problems facing the commercial aviation industry as it began to grow and diversify significantly for the first time. Meanwhile, the success of the ALPA in lobbying for political support established it as a significant power in organized labor.

== Background ==
=== Airlines ===
Century-Pacific Lines Limited, in California, and Century Airlines, in Chicago, were founded in 1931 (95 years ago) by Errett Lobban Cord.

=== Aviation industry ===
In 1925 the Kelly Act was passed giving the postmaster general the authority to allocate air mail routes to potential bidders and thus, the floodgates were opened for investment in the new industry of commercial aviation. The next few years were characterized by mergers and jockeying for position amongst the various new enterprises and by 1931 a core group of major airlines had emerged including names such as American Airways and United Airlines.

Resentment began to grow however amongst smaller companies looking to take advantage of the emerging market for passenger travel who saw the larger companies as receiving unfair advantages in terms of route allocations and subsidies. The McNary-Watres Act of 1930, with its provision to allow the postmaster general to extend contracts with existing carriers without considering competing bids, especially fueled such resentment. In response to an amendment to the bill which would limit this particular power, then postmaster general Walter Folger Brown, "was very much opposed to the measure and explained what in his opinion would happen should it become law. He declared that low bidders getting contracts would find that they could not operate and that successors to them would take over the business. These successors would then come to the department for relief." E.L. Cord was particularly determined to change the system, striving to demonstrate that he could offer the cheapest service, even going so far as to say that he could carry mail for 30 cents a mile, roughly half the standard for existing routes. Cord’s primary idea for how this could be done was through slashing overheads, particularly wages.

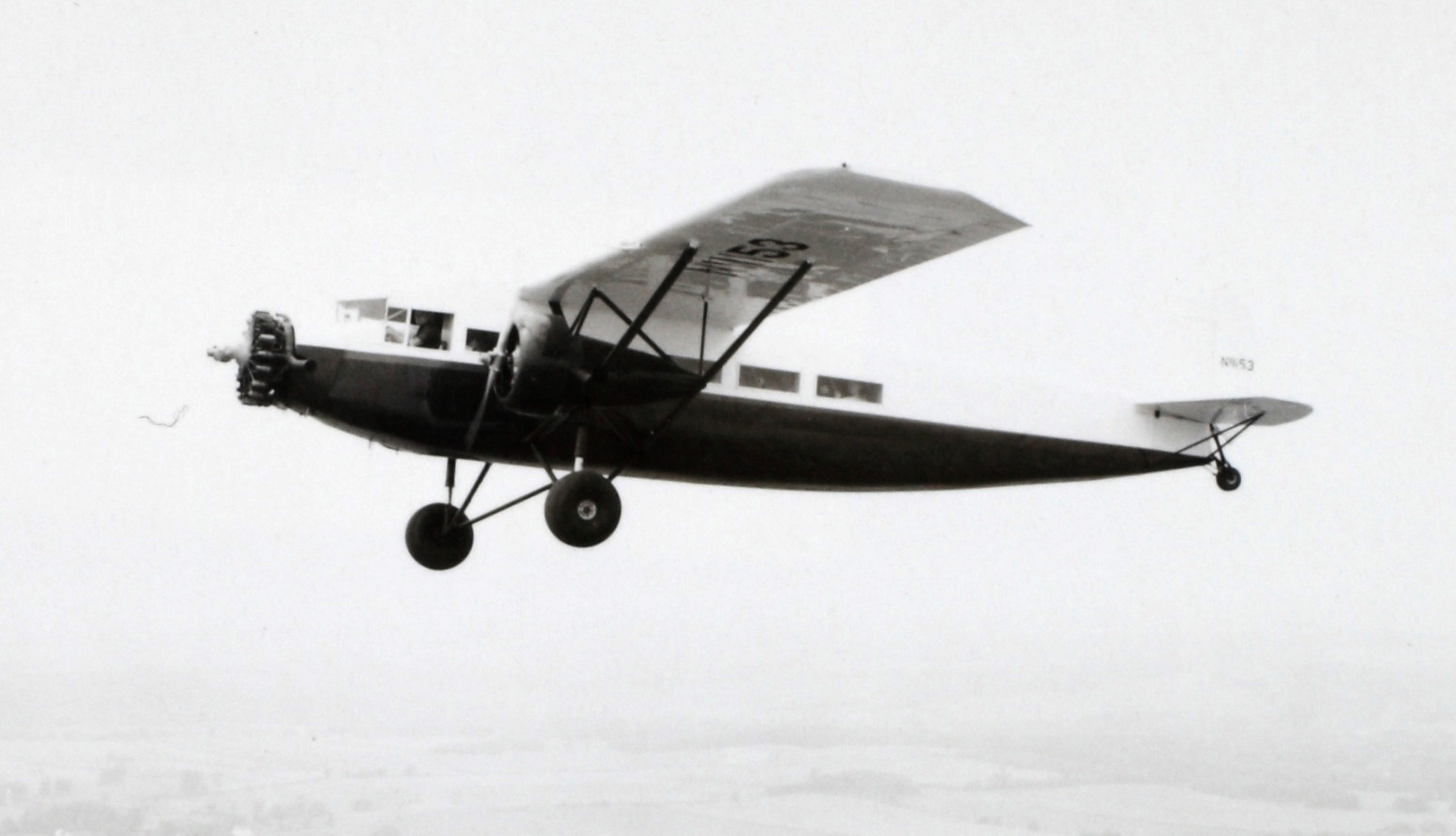
Stinson SM-6000, the model of plane operated by Century Air Lines. Both the Stinson Aircraft Company and Lycoming Engines, the manufacturer of the plane's engines, were owned by E.L. Cord.

=== Pilots ===
With the technology of aviation still in its infancy, the pilot’s profession remained a fairly treacherous one. Pressure to fly from Post Office administrators in treacherous weather conditions especially caused many fatal accidents. In 1919, the first demonstration of organized action by pilots took place when a threat of strike action was made after two pilots were fired by assistant postmaster general Otto Praeger for refusing to fly in heavy fog. One of the two pilots was eventually reinstated and post office administrators agreed to more stringent safety standards regarding foul weather flying.

In May 1931, the Air Line Pilots Association was founded by David L. Behncke and it quickly became the largest union for pilots in the country including three quarters of the schedule line pilots in the country by the next year. The decision was precipitated by changing pay conditions which were increasingly reducing the earnings of pilots during the early years of the depression.

Meanwhile, technology improvements in aviation were changing the perception of flying. New features such as “robot pilots” which could control the planes through gyroscopes were making the task of piloting seem easier and easier. Cord in particular made it known that he did not regard piloting as an especially skillful endeavor and subsequently saw no justification for paying pilots high wages.

== Strike timeline ==
On January 23, the management of Century announced a new wage scale for pilots which effectively resulted in a 40% cut, to be effective from February 1. After initially agreeing to defer the decision by ten days in order to give the pilots and the ALPA a chance for arbitration, Cord decided on the 9th to refuse any further negotiations and immediately put into action the new wage scale. When the pilots arrived to work that morning they were met by armed guards and were ordered to resign in order to reapply to work under the new pay scale. The pilots rejected this request and instead marched to the Chicago ALPA headquarters.

=== Recruiting replacements ===
Cord immediately set to work recruiting replacement pilots. By February 4, Century officials had announced that they had nearly reached the required quota for their schedules saying they had “far more applicants for the vacated positions than they could use”. Most of the scheduled routes suffered only slight disruption as a result. Indeed, replacements would not have been difficult to come by. Contemporary estimates at the number of qualified commercial pilots came to around 4000 with only a total of about 700 planes in service.

=== Crash in St. Louis ===
On March 8, two Century pilots were fatally injured in a crash where replacement recruits were practicing night landings in anticipation of a resumption of full night flight services. The two dead were John F. Kirk of Chicago and Lloyd H. Atkinson who had been a test pilot in Los Angeles before moving to Chicago to find work. The crash occurred while on final approach into Curtiss-Steinberg Airport at about 1.50am when pilot Theodore Graff struck a windmill short of the runway.

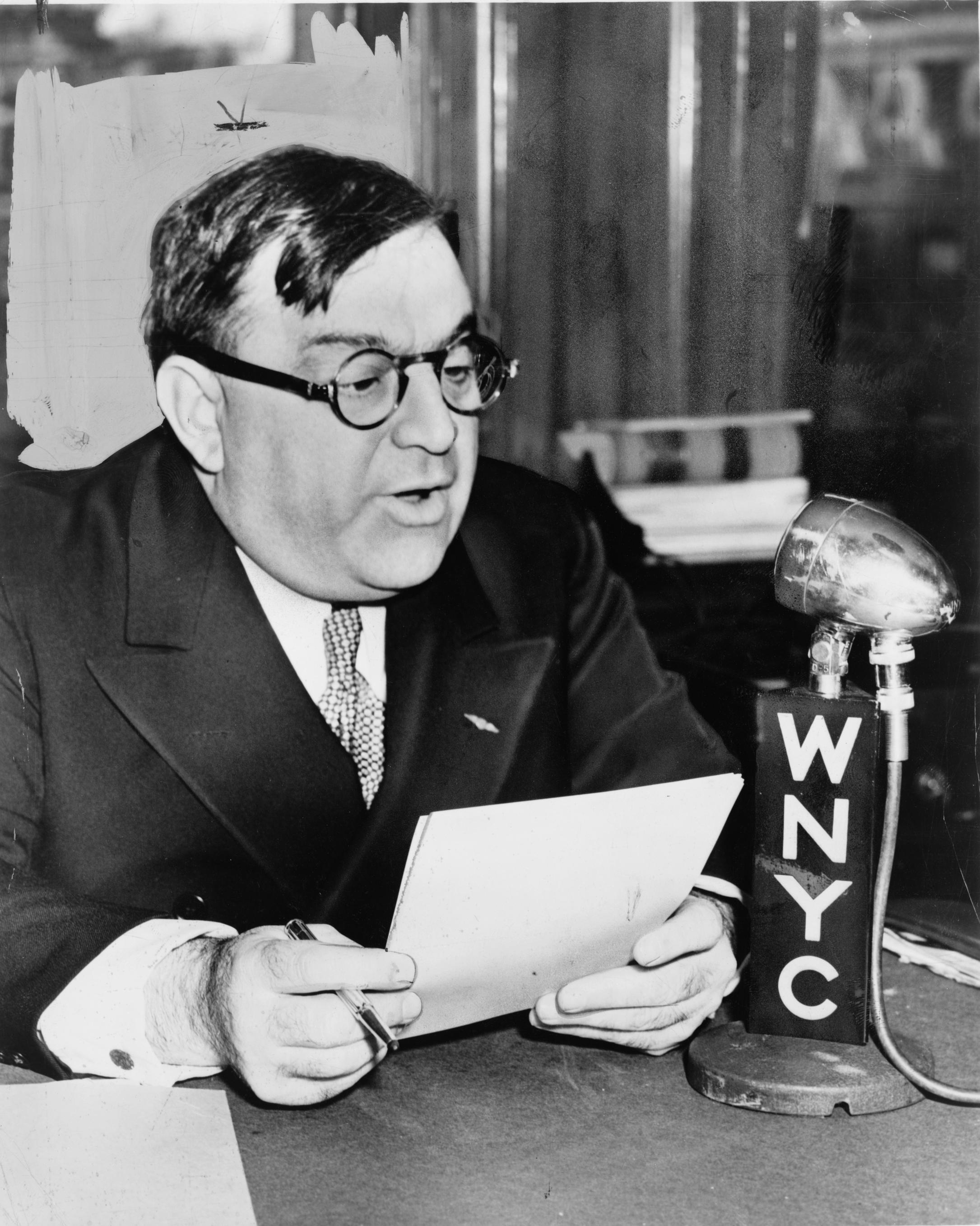
New York Representative, Fiorello La Guardia. La Guardia had been a pilot in World War I, commanding of a unit of Ca.44 bombers.

=== ALPA political campaign ===
The ALPA were able to call on sympathetic ears for their cause from within influential political circles, both national and local. Representative Fiorello La Guardia of New York first raised the issue in Congress on February 18 when he condemned Cord and his practices and furthermore spoke about the need for Department of Commerce inspectors to keep and publish records of the replacement pilots, “because you can readily see the danger of putting inexperienced men in charge of passenger planes, not alone for the passengers but for the people on the ground below.” Several more congressmen vocalized their displeasure with Cord’s conduct including Representative William Larson from Georgia as well as Melvin Maas of Minnesota who asked the Secretaries of War and Navy to discourage military pilots on leave from flying Century planes, while two more representatives contacted the Mayor of Chicago to ask him to investigate the business affairs of Cord in Chicago. Hearings in the United States House of Representatives heard testimony from ALPA president David Behncke and from Dean Bourford, one of the striking Century Air Lines pilots. The whole affair had left Cord in an even weaker position with regard to bidding for routes, with postmaster general Brown expressing his allegiance to the striking pilots.

=== Century Air Lines sold ===
Under the weight of the political pressure from both national and local government, Cord was first forced to reduce flight services before he relented on April 2, selling Century Airlines to AVCO, in turn ending the strike. In exchange, Cord received 140,000 shares in the Aviation Corporation and also a directorship in the company. Neither the striking pilots, nor the replacements were to be brought over in the merger.

== Aftermath ==
The strike gave the ALPA the opportunity to assert itself as a power for organized pilots in America as it launched campaigns against the strikebreakers. The “Century Airlines Scab List” was printed on the front page of the first issue of the union's journal, Air Line Pilot, in April. David Behncke convinced employers to fire strikebreakers who had been employed and much of the first convention of the ALPA, held in Chicago in October 1932, focused on the Century Airlines strike. By the mid-1930s the ALPA had close to 100% of all commercial pilots in the U.S. on its rolls. Furthermore, the ALPA had established itself as a strong political voice and managed to lobby for improved wage calculations for pilots which took into account both the hours and mileage flown, thus insuring that wages wouldn’t be affected by the development of faster planes.

E.L. Cord became the largest stockholder in the American Aviation Corporation, buying an extra 100,000 shares on top of the 138,000 he received from the sale of Century.

== Historical interpretation ==
Isaac Cohen uses the Century Air Lines strike to draw comparisons with the 1983 strike of Continental Airlines pilots. He emphasizes that the political climate of 1932, in contrast with 1983, made conditions far more favorable for the striking pilots stating, “the pro-regulatory mood of 1932 generated governmental, congressional, and municipal support for ALPA, increased considerably the bargaining power of organized pilots, and, in turn, played a key role in ALPA's victory over Errett Lobban Cord.” For Cohen, the still heavy regulatory presence of the Post Office in commercial airlines in 1932, combined with a political arena that was “becoming increasingly responsive to the demands of organized labor” ensured that significant political weight could be thrown behind efforts to undermine Cord.

Robert Van der Linden too underscores the political pressure Cord was facing during the strike and also during the months leading up to it as his attempts to curry favor for deregulation had been met with antagonism. However, Van der Linden argues that the sale of Century to AVCO which ended the strike, rather than being the last resort of a beaten man, had been part of Cord’s plan all along: "Cord, a master of the financial world, understood AVCO's weak position and sought to exploit the situation if his public attempts to secure an air mail contract failed. By early 1932, as it became clear that Cord was losing his public fight, he turned his attention directly to AVCO..." Within a year, Cord had managed to gain complete control of AVCO.

== See also ==
- Air Mail scandal
- United States government role in civil aviation

== Sources ==
- Cohen, Isaac (January 1990). "Political Climate and Two Airline Strikes: Century Air in 1932 and Continental Airlines in 1983-85". Industrial and Labor Relations Review. 43 (2): 308–323. doi:10.2307/2523707. JSTOR 2523707.
- Hopkins, George E. (October 2013). The Airline Pilots: A Study in Elite Unionization. Harvard University Press. ISBN 978-0-674-49873-0.
- Hopkins, George E. (1996). Flying the Line: The First Half Century of the Air Line Pilots Association. Air Line Pilots Association. ISBN 978-0-9609708-1-0.
- van der Linden, F. Robert (October 21, 2021). Airlines and Air Mail: The Post Office and the Birth of the Commercial Aviation Industry. University Press of Kentucky. ISBN 978-0-8131-8441-8.
