= Planet Airways =

American airline

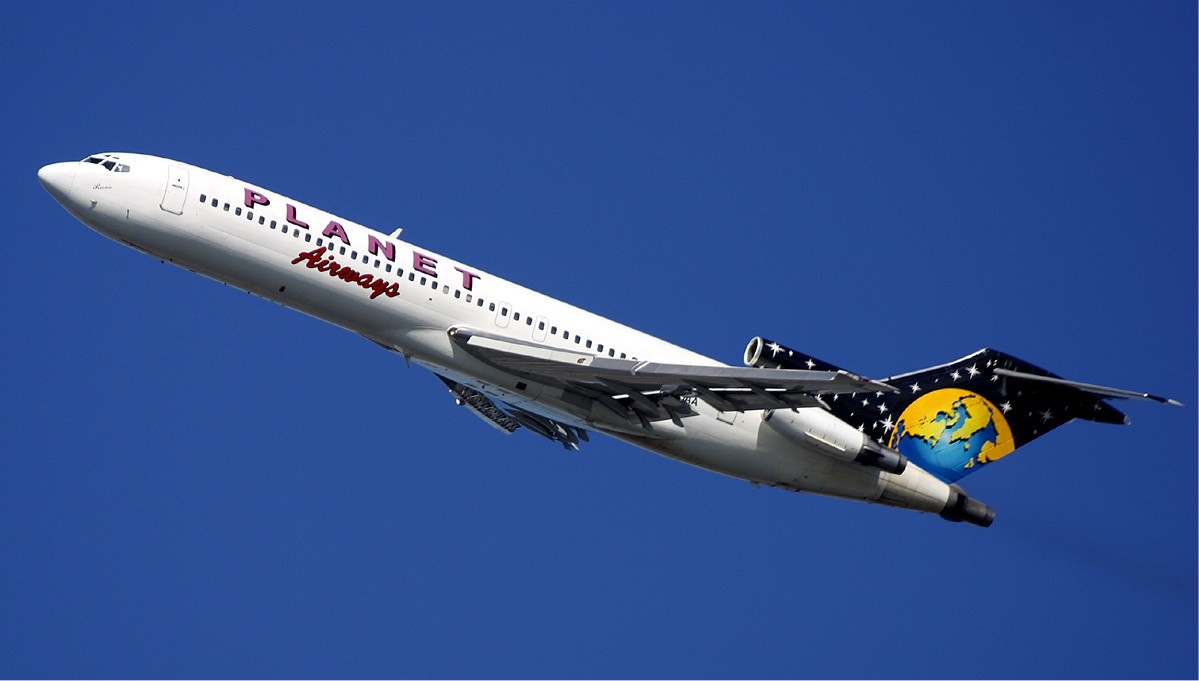
- Planet Airways Boeing 727
IATA	ICAO	Call sign
–	PLZ	PLANET
- Founded: 1995; 31 years ago
- Ceased operations: 2005; 21 years ago
- Fleet size: See Fleet below
- Headquarters: Orlando, Florida, United States
- Key people: Peter V. Garrambone; Tony DeCamillis; Lou Pearlman

Planet Airways was an airline based in Orlando, Florida, USA which was established as Airship Airways in 1998 before being renamed with the current name in 2000. It operated charter services within the USA and to the Caribbean.

== Code data ==
- ICAO Code: PLZ
- Callsign: Planet

== History ==
The company was a private venture co-founded by Peter V. Garrambone and Tony DeCamillis, which was partly funded by Lou Pearlman. Upon Garrambone's resignation Tony DeCamillis became President & CEO. The airline began in 1995 when it incorporated as "Planet Airways, Inc.," a startup airline seeking FAA Part 121 certification. It acquired its first plane in 1998, was granted FAA Part 121 approval to fly charter services, and obtained FAA certification in 2000. Planet operated a fleet of 6 Boeing 727 jet aircraft for customers including the United States Marshals Service, the United States Forest Service, and the United States Department of Defense. In the fiscal year 2004, Planet Airways received nearly 10% of the total revenues awarded by the Department of Defense to all qualified US carriers for domestic charters.

According to information in a news release distributed by Planet Holdings Corp (PHC), Planet Airways had agreed to be acquired by the business development firm. The PHC acquisition was created as an alternative means to provide capital to modernize Planet's aging fleet, beginning with the replacement of two recently retired aircraft. PHC had already completed a funding with Sierra Aircraft Leasing specifically to facilitate the acquisition of Planet's first two Boeing 757 aircraft.

The PHC acquisition of Planet was terminated by Planet in January 2005. DeCamillis learned that the principal operator of PHC, Kevin James Quinn, had been disbarred as an attorney in California and was also banned by the SEC from participating in public offerings. DeCamillis reported Quinn's violation to the Securities and Exchange Commission's Division of Enforcement and cancelled PHC's planned acquisition of Planet. Pearlman, who had introduced Quinn, became adversarial and DeCamillis subsequently resigned as Chief Executive Officer of the airline. That same year, under Pearlman and his new management team, the airline ceased flight operations in mid-2005.

On September 30, 2020, The Secretary of Communications and Transport known as SCT on behalf of the Mexican Government of President Andrés Manuel López Obrador notified the beginning of the legal abandonment process to whoever legally own one of the planes that was left behind in the International Mariano Matamoros Airport of Morelos State, located in Temixco near the Morelos's Capital Cuernavaca, Mexico. They notified to whoever owned the plane to remove it from the airport, this is done in efforts of the government to set order in all the airports nearby Ciudad de Mexico.

On June 17, 2021, The Mexican Government expropriated the plane left behind in International Mariano Matamoros Airport of Morelos State and notified the legal movement through the Federal Civil Aviation Agency, that they would take claim of the abandoned plane. The plane is registered with plate number XA-UII and it is Boeing 727-222 model, records for the plate show it was sold to Pan Am Air Cargo in 2007 but the plane physically is still painted as Planet Airways, the plane historically began flying in 1968 where it started under United Airlines Cargo.

== Department of Defense Civil Reserve Air Fleet ==
Planet Airways was a Department of Defense Civil Reserve Air Fleet (CRAF) qualified air carrier until the cessation of operations in 2005. The United States Air Force describes the CRAF as non-military air carriers that meet the strict qualifications and requirements to operate on behalf of the DOD in emergencies when the need for airlift exceeds the capability of military aircraft. As a CRAF airline Planet Airways operated domestic flights transporting US military personnel on a regular basis.

Planet Airways prepared for several years to meet Department of Defense standards, which are described as follows:

"Safety is the paramount concern, and numerous procedures are in effect to ensure that the air carriers with which AMC contracts afford the highest level of safety to DOD passengers. Prior to receiving a contract, all carriers must demonstrate that they have provided substantially equivalent and comparable commercial service for one year before submitting their offer to fly for the Defense Department. All carriers must be fully certified Federal Aviation Administration carriers and meet the stringent standards of Federal Aviation Regulations pertaining to commercial airlines (Part 121)."

“A DOD survey team, composed of experienced AMC pilots and skilled maintenance personnel, performs an on-site inspection of the carriers. This team conducts a comprehensive inspection that includes carrier's aircraft, training facilities, crew qualifications, maintenance procedures, quality control practices and financial status to maximize the likelihood that the carrier would safely perform for DOD. After passing this survey, the carrier is certified by the Commercial Airlift Review Board as DOD-approved before receiving a contract.”

“AMC analysts then continue to monitor the carrier's safety record, operations and maintenance status, contract performance, financial condition and management initiatives, summarizing significant trends in a comprehensive review every six months. In addition to this in-depth review, there are several other surveillance initiatives. These include safety preflight inspections of commercial aircraft by DOD designated inspectors, periodic cockpit observations on operational flights by highly experienced pilots from AMC's DOD Commercial Airlift Division, and an increase in the frequency of on-site surveys. These initiatives and the surveys are further supplemented by an open flow of information on all contract carriers between AMC and the FAA through established liaison officers.”

In fiscal year 2004 Planet Airways received nearly 10% of the total revenues awarded by the Department of Defense for domestic charter flights transporting U.S. military personnel.

== Fleet ==
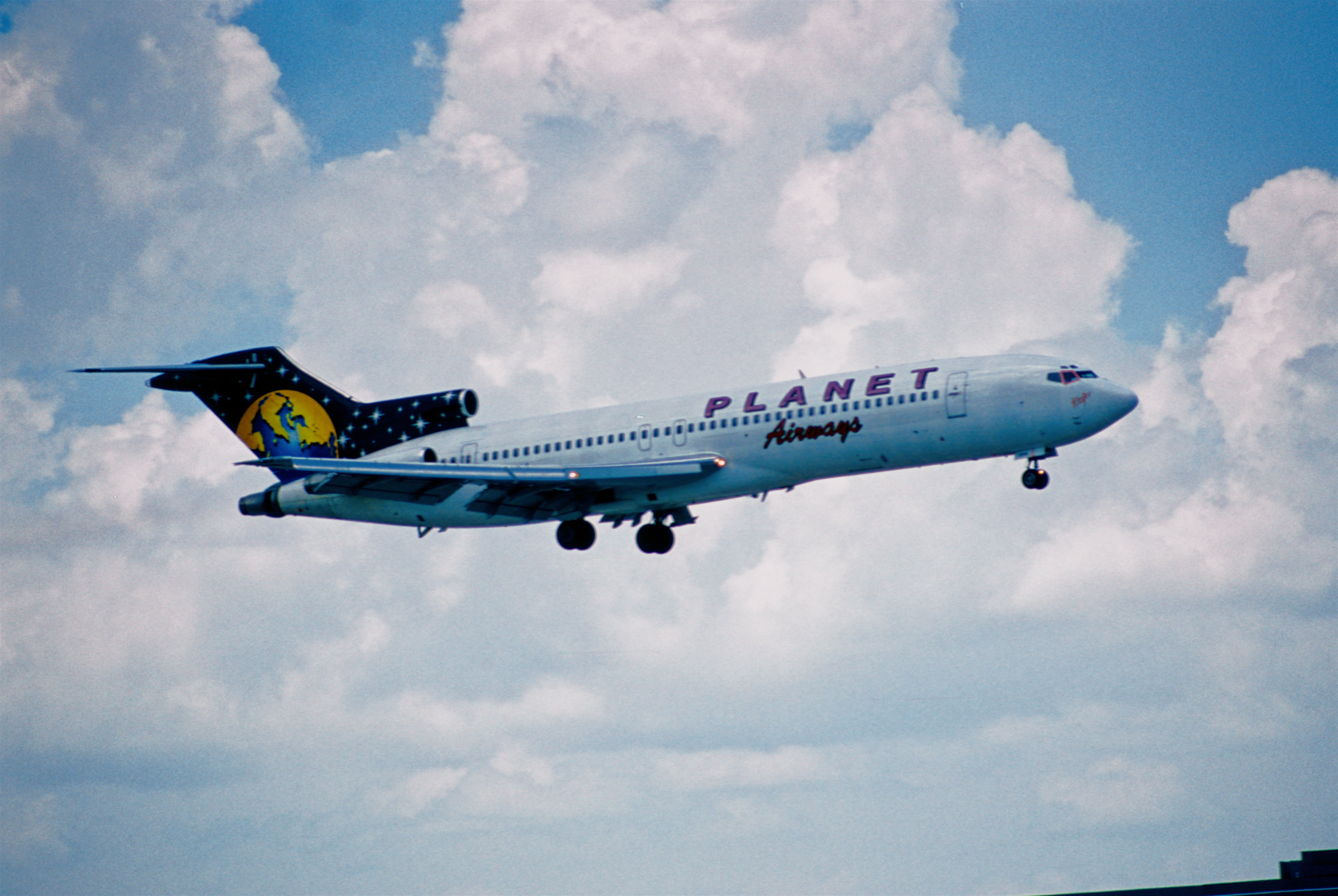
Planet Airways Boeing 727-223

Throughout most of the company's history Planet owned and operated a fleet of seven (7) Boeing jet aircraft consisting of six Boeing 727-200s and one Boeing 727-100. As of January 2005 the Planet Airways fleet included:

- 5 – Boeing 727-100/200

== See also ==
- List of defunct airlines of the United States
