= Arizona Airways (1993–1996) =

1993–1996 airline in the United States

IATA	ICAO	Call sign
VZ	AZY	ARIZAIR
- Founded: June 1992; 32 years ago
- Ceased operations: August 1995; 29 years ago
- Hubs: Tucson International Airport
- Destinations: 11
- Headquarters: Tucson, AZ
- Key people: Jim Swartz (CEO)

Arizona Airways (IATA: VZ, ICAO: AZY, call sign: Arizair) was an airline that was conceived as a regional airline to provide service to cities throughout the Southwestern United States and the Mexican state of Sonora from Texas to California. The airline was in service between 1993 and 1996.

== History ==
Originally announced in late 1991, Arizona Airways envisioned to create 165 jobs and generate $70 million to the local economy. In March 1992, the carrier was given its FAA approval. After it was given approval, service was initially to commence in June 1992, with three roundtrips each business day and two each on Saturday and Sunday between Tucson and San Diego. By July 1992, the U.S. Department of Transportation awarded the airline a route from Tucson to Hermosillo. At the time of this announcement, the airline also stated it was considering flying all of its domestic flights out of Avra Valley Airport in neighboring Marana due to the higher gate fees at Tucson International Airport; however, these plans never materialized. Growth of the airline was rapid in its first year resulting in the carrier offering more flights from Tucson than any other carrier by April 1994.

However, by July 1995 the carrier was unable to pay its fees at the airport and sought out an alliance with Minneapolis-based Great Lakes Aviation to generate additional revenue. In August 1995, the deal with Great Lakes became official and the carrier was rebranded as Arizona Airways Express. The carrier was then merged into Great Lakes Airlines on January 15, 1996.

== Fleet ==
- In 1995 the company's fleet included two Beechcraft 1300 and two Beechcraft 1900C aircraft.

== Destinations ==
- Arizona
  - Bullhead City (Laughlin/Bullhead International Airport)
  - Phoenix (Phoenix International Airport)
  - Tucson (Tucson International Airport) – Primary Hub
- California
  - Ontario (Ontario International Airport)
  - Orange County (John Wayne Airport)
  - San Diego (San Diego International Airport)
- New Mexico
  - Albuquerque (Albuquerque International Sunport)
- Texas
  - El Paso (El Paso International Airport)
- Sonora
  - Ciudad Obregón (Ciudad Obregón International Airport)
  - Guaymas (General José María Yáñez International Airport)
  - Hermosillo (Ignacio L. Pesqueira International Airport)

== See also ==
- List of defunct airlines of the United States
