= Pacific Alaska Airways =

US airline, 1932–1941

| IATA | ICAO | Call sign |
|---|---|---|
| - | - | - |
- Founded: 1932; 94 years ago
- Ceased operations: 1941; 85 years ago
- Fleet size: Lockheed Model 10 Electra
- Destinations: Juneau, Alaska; Fairbanks, Alaska
- Parent company: Pan American World Airways

Pacific Alaska Airways was a subsidiary of Pan American World Airways that flew routes around Alaska. The airline was eventually completely absorbed into Pan Am in 1941.

== History ==
Pacific Alaska Airways was established as ACA Aviation Corporation of the Americas in 1927, renamed to Pacific Alaska Airways in 1932 and the same year acquired Alaskan Airways. The first air mail services were commenced on 3 September 1933. On April 3, 1935, the airline flew the first air route from Juneau, Alaska to Fairbanks, Alaska. During this time period, the airline flew Lockheed Model 10 Electra and Fairchild aircraft. They also operated a radio station on Canyon Island during the 1930s. During their operation the airline purchased equipment and routes of a number of Alaskan operators.

== See also ==
- List of defunct airlines of the United States
