= Monarch Air Lines =

US airline (1946–1950) that merged to form Frontier

- Commenced operations: November 27, 1946; 78 years ago
- Ceased operations: June 1, 1950; 75 years ago (merged with Arizona Airways and Challenger Airlines to form Frontier Airlines)
- Subsidiaries: Challenger Airlines
- Fleet size: five Douglas DC-3s
- Destinations: Albuquerque; Salt Lake City; Grand Junction
- Headquarters: Denver, Colorado, U.S.
- Key people: F.W. Bonfils (founder); Hal S. Darr (president)

Monarch Air Lines was an American local service airline based in Denver, Colorado, that began its scheduled air service on November 27, 1946, with a flight from Denver to Durango, Colorado, using a Douglas DC-3. It was formed by F.W. Bonfils of The Denver Post family and Ray M. Wilson, who operated a Denver flying school. Other services started to Albuquerque, Salt Lake City and Grand Junction.

Monarch pioneered all-weather operations in its service area by installing its own navigational system. By 1948, the airline was sharing several functions with Challenger Airlines, such as maintenance and sales at Denver. Monarch bought a controlling interest in Challenger in December 1949.

Monarch merged with Arizona Airways and Challenger Airlines on June 1, 1950, to form Frontier Airlines. Monarch's President, Hal S. Darr, became President of the new airline. Ray Wilson became V.P. Operations and Maintenance of the new company and Monarch's Treasurer, C.A. Myhre, became Executive Vice President and later President of Frontier.

Monarch operated five Douglas DC-3 aircraft at the time of the merger: NC64421, NC64422, NC64423, NC64424, and NC66610. They became Frontier "Sunliners" named Arizona, New Mexico, Royal Gorge, Mesa Verde and Utah.

== Destinations during the late 1940s ==
Monarch was serving the following destinations on a daily basis with Douglas DC-3 aircraft during the late 1940s:

- Albuquerque, NM
- Canon City, CO
- Colorado Springs, CO
- Cortez, CO
- Denver, CO - company headquarters
- Durango, CO
- Farmington, NM
- Gallup, NM
- Grand Junction, CO
- Monte Vista, CO - Alamosa, CO was served via Monte Vista
- Price, UT
- Provo, UT
- Pueblo, CO
- Salt Lake City, UT

== See also ==
- List of defunct airlines of the United States (J–P)
