= Aerovias Sud Americana =

US scheduled all-cargo carrier 1947–1965

Aerovias Sud Americana dba ASA International Airlines
IATA	ICAO	Call sign
JI^{(1)}	JI^{(1)}	—
- Founded: 11 October 1947 incorporated in Florida
- Commenced operations: 17 October 1947
- Ceased operations: 16 April 1965
- Operating bases: St Petersburg, Florida
- Fleet size: See Fleet
- Destinations: See Destinations
- Headquarters: Miami, Florida; St Petersburg, Florida; United States
- Founder: Owen Williams

Notes
- (1) IATA, ICAO codes were the same until the 1980s

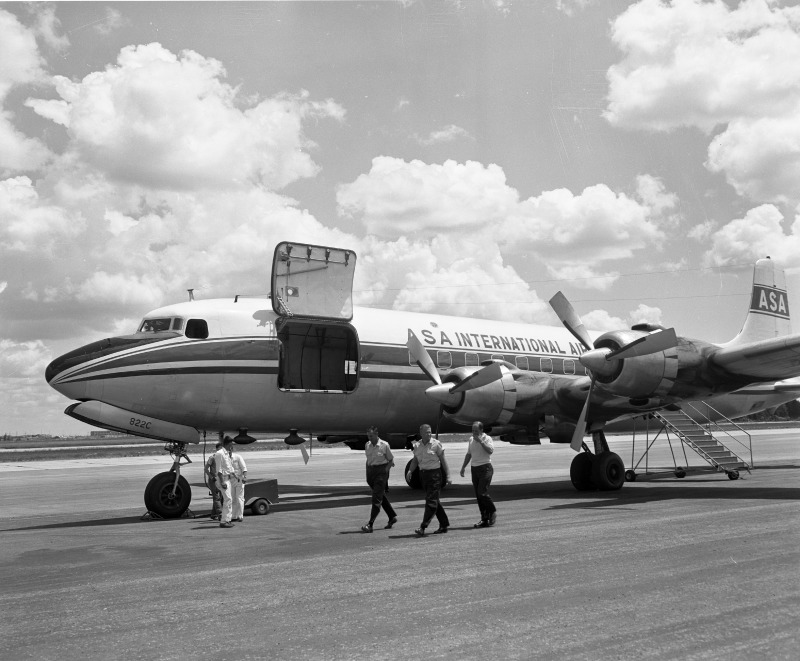
DC-6A Cheyenne July 1960

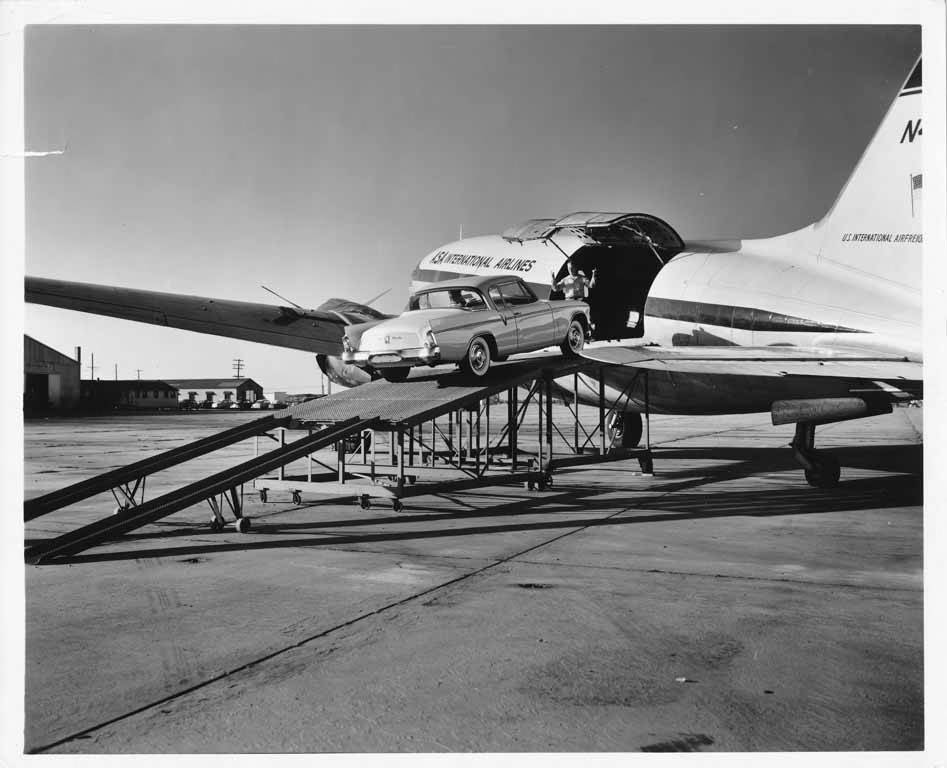
C-46 at St Petersburg 1956

Aerovias Sud Americana dba ASA International Airlines (ASA) was one of the first cargo airlines to fly between the United States and Latin America, a US carrier certificated as an "all-cargo carrier" to fly air freight on a scheduled basis between Florida and Latin America in 1952 by the Civil Aeronautics Board (CAB), the now-defunct Federal agency that, at the time, tightly regulated almost all US commercial air transportation. ASA was undersized relative to contemporary freight airlines, but operated successfully in the 1950s nonetheless. Thereafter political instability, changing regulations and regulatory inertia impacted ASA and it failed to make the transition to jets. The CAB denied attempts by Riddle Airlines (later known as Airlift International) to merge with ASA before and after ASA collapsed in 1965.

== History ==
=== Startup and pre-certification ===
Aerovias Sud Americana was incorporated in Florida on 11 October 1947, by Owen Williams and other former employees of U. S. Airlines (then also based at St Petersburg). Founding capital was only $1000. ASA made its first flight 17 October with a delivery of Jeeps from St Petersburg to Havana, Cuba. ASA applied for and received a "letter of registration", which the CAB provided to irregular air carriers in lieu of a certificate. Subsequent loads included race horses and tobacco; at the time Tampa was a center of US cigar manufacturing. The Spanish name was said to be helpful selling within Latin America. In 1949 the CAB told the airline its activities looked too much like a scheduled carrier, at which point most of the existing business and most of the original founding team moved to a Cuba-based affiliate.

ASA first applied to the CAB for a certificate in 1948, ultimately requesting authority to fly scheduled service from St Petersburg/Tampa to Havana, points in Mexico and Central America and Colombia. At the time ASA had a single C-46. In April 1951, still undecided about such certification, the CAB gave ASA an exemption to fly scheduled freight between St Petersburg/Tampa and Guatemala City. Finally, in June 1952, the CAB granted certification to ASA for a five year term, including the right to fly to Balboa, Panama (i.e. Panama City) in the then-US controlled Panama Canal Zone. It was to do so without subsidy, this being an important distinction in an era where the CAB subsidized many US passenger carriers. President Harry S. Truman gave the required assent in August. ASA started certificated scheduled service on 4 December.

=== Scheduled cargo carrier ===
ASA specialized in flying heavy/bulky cargo that would not usually travel by air domestically. By the mid 1950s, ASA US leader in shipping cattle and automobiles by air. There were animal holding pens at St Petersburg airport and advertisements in relevant periodicals. The most successful Latin American points on the network were Panama City, San Salvador and Guatemala City. In 1956, ASA's market split, by pounds shipped, was 74% southbound, 20% northbound, 6% between non-US points. Of the 74% southbound traffic, 55 percentage points was general cargo, 14 was cattle and 4 was automobiles.

Unusually, ASA had no military charter business. All the other scheduled cargo carriers (Flying Tiger, Slick, Seaboard & Western, Riddle and, in the late 1950s, AAXICO Airlines) developed large military charter businesses during the 1950s. In the year ending June 1959, then the US government financial year, military charters comprised well over a third of every other scheduled cargo carrier's revenues, in some cases much more: Slick Airways had no scheduled cargo revenue that period, almost 100% of its revenue coming from military charters. Challenges included trade imbalance; there was not much to ship northbound, since most exports from the area at the time were commodities or agricultural items. Another was political instability and lack of aviation treaties with most Latin American countries, which meant landing rights could be withdrawn at any time, a source of significant uncertainty. ASA was also undersized. In 1956, Flying Tiger had over 15 times ASA's revenue, Slick and Seaboard & Western were almost 10 times the revenue. Riddle was over three times as large.

Aerovias Sud Americana Financial Results, 1953 thru 1964
USD 000	1953	1954	1955	1956	1957	1958	1959	1960	1961	1962	1963	1964
Operating Revenue	707	1,630	1,960	2,116	2,058	1,868	1,532	3,180	2,471	1,750	1,534	1,428
Op profit (loss)	(44)	124	28	(14)	(12)	(53)	4	(20)	(215)	(281)	(238)	(366)
Op margin (%)	-6.2	7.6	1.4	-0.7	-0.6	-2.8	0.3	-0.6	-8.7	-16.1	-15.5	-25.6

CAB schematic showing ASA's route authority before and after its certificate renewal case in 1959. The routes did not have to be served in the order shown. For instance, Mexico did not permit ASA to serve Merida, and ASA served Guatemala City nonstop

On the one hand, the CAB did provide some help. In 1955 ASA received additional nonscheduled authority to fly to three countries not originally on its network: Nicaragua, Costa Rica and Ecuador. In 1959, these were added to the scheduled certificate, as were Venezuela and Peru. Further, Miami was added as a "co-terminal" with St Petersburg/Tampa. On the other hand, the slow CAB process hurt. These extensions were granted as part of ASA's renewal of its certificate, which expired October 1957. ASA timely applied for renewal, so scheduled authority continued while the CAB deliberated. That deliberation took almost two years, with uncertainty hanging over the company. Time-limited certificates such as ASA's were themselves a problem, making financing difficult. Trunk carriers like American Airlines had permanent certificates.

As the 1950s ended and the 1960s began, ASA faced two other notable problems:

- Cuba service was suspended March 1959 due to the Cuban Revolution. Cuban air freight was ASA's foundation business.
- In 1960 Guatemala protected its flag carrier, Aviateca, by preventing other airlines from flying to Guatemala. In 1959, Guatemala accounted for about 60% of ASA's scheduled business, and losing Guatemala reduced the ability to serve El Salvador, another good market.

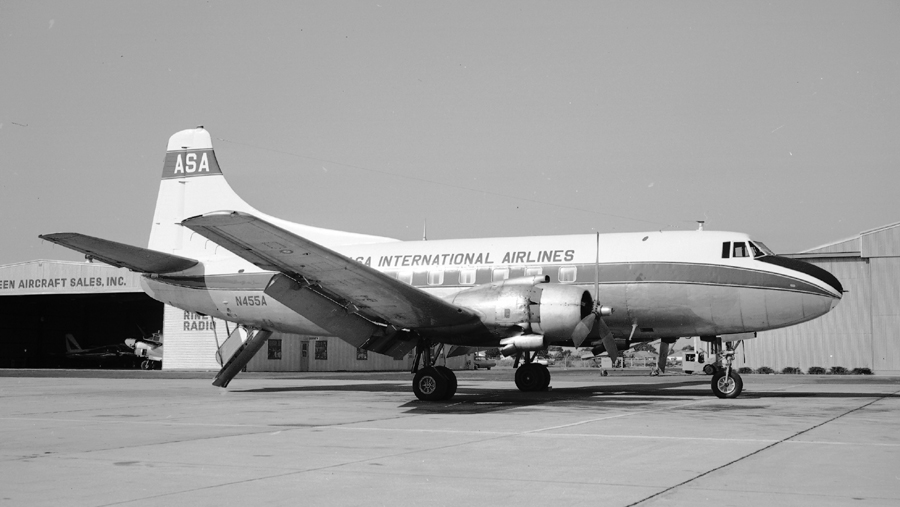
Martin 4-0-4 at San Jose 1961

Revenues from the Latin American scheduled system collapsed from $1.75 million in 1957 to $435,000 in 1961. Some good news was that ASA got a year-long $900,000 Air Force contract from 1 July 1959 to fly parts and people coast to coast on a so-called Rocket Run, for the Air Force Ballistic Missile Division, between California and Cape Canaveral. This was renewed in 1960 for a second year. The amount of the contract was substantial relative to ASA's revenues and explains the revenue uplift 1960 and 1961 financials.

=== Riddle ===
On 17 August 1960, citing the Guatemala decision as a precipitating event, ASA abruptly announced it would move to Miami effective September 1, leaving behind the St Petersburg animal pens and almost all of its employees. On 8 March 1961, ASA announced it was merging with Miami-based Riddle Airlines, which seemed like a natural fit. Riddle flew scheduled cargo between northern cities and Miami and Puerto Rico. In July, the CAB's Bureau of Economic Regulations recommended the Board approve the deal. In September, the CAB examiner on the case said the same. The CAB even approved some interim measures, giving Riddle the right to fly ASA's aircraft in the meantime and vice versa. But two and a half years after Riddle and ASA first approached the CAB, in November 1963, the CAB rejected it, saying Riddle wasn't as healthy as back in March 1961. But the CAB caused the delay during which Riddle and ASA experienced two poor years, hanging fire on the CAB decision.

Unfortunately, ASA was also no longer able to access military charters. From 1961 onward, US military business was preferentially directed towards airlines that could supply aircraft to the Civil Reserve Air Fleet (CRAF) that the US military viewed as particularly valuable, in particular, turbine (jet or turboprop) aircraft. By December 1963, ASA stood alone as the only certificated cargo airline without turbine equipment. From financial 1962 (started July 1961) onward, ASA received no further military business. ASA stopped operations 16 April 1965.

Riddle (named Airlift International since 1965), did not give up. In 1965, it bought out some of the biggest shareholders of moribund, bankrupt ASA and went back to the CAB, which, once again, after a long delay, rejected the deal a second time in 1968. The CAB finally cancelled ASA's certificate December 20, 1968.

== ASA International Airlines ==
ASA did business as "ASA International Airlines" almost the entire time it was a certificated airline. There are uses of the trade name as early as 1953. However, CAB and other official settings the airline was referred to by its legal name and almost always in news articles.

== Fleet ==
September 1952:

- 2 C-46

April 1957:

- 4 Curtiss C-46

Year end 1962:

- 3 Douglas DC-7C
- 2 Douglas DC-4
- 2 Lockheed L-049 Constellation
- 1 Curtiss C-46

== Destinations ==
See nearby map.

== Accidents ==
- 20 March 1953: Curtiss C-46A N66559 missed an engine-out approach to St Petersburg. The crew added power for go-around but the aircraft stalled and crashed. The aircraft was a write-off, but everyone on board survived.
- 12 December 1956: Curtiss C-46F N1662M on a flight from Panama City to Bogota an engine overrevved and on shutdown, propeller could not be feathered. The aircraft was unable to make it on return to Panama City and ditched in the Pacific where it floated for a half hour. The crew survived.
- 6 November 1957: Curtiss C-46A N10425 suffered a loss of engine power shortly after departure from Guatemala City on a flight to British Honduras. The aircraft was unable to maintain altitude on the remaining engine. Finding a place to put down the aircraft was a challenge due to the presence of many people on suitable landing sites, ultimately the aircraft crashed into a building killing two inside, crew was severely hurt but survived.

== See also ==
- List of defunct airlines of the United States
