= Brower Airlines =

Regional airline during the 1970s in United States

IATA	ICAO	Call sign
UD	-	-
- Founded: April 17, 1968; 57 years ago
- Ceased operations: 1980; 45 years ago
- Operating bases: Fort Madison
- Key people: Thomas J Whitman

Brower Airlines (initially known as Brower Airways) was a regional airline in the midwestern United States from 1969 to 1979. It was the only airline based in Iowa at the time. It was owned and operated by Alvin Brower, and used a small fleet of Cessna 402 aircraft. It was headquartered at Fort Madison Municipal Airport in Fort Madison.

== Destinations ==
Brower served the following destinations:

- Burlington, Iowa
- Chicago (O'Hare), Illinois
- Des Moines, Iowa
- Fort Madison, Iowa
- Jacksonville, Illinois
- Keokuk, Iowa
- Macomb, Illinois
- Peoria, Illinois
- Springfield, Illinois
- St. Louis, Missouri

== See also ==
- List of defunct airlines of the United States
