= Arizona Airways =

Late 1940s Arizona intrastate airline that merged into Frontier

- Founded: 8 September 1942
- Commenced operations: March 17, 1946
- Ceased operations: 28 February 1948
- Operating bases: Phoenix, Arizona
- Fleet size: 3
- Destinations: See Destinations below
- Headquarters: Phoenix, Arizona; United States
- Key people: H.O. (Rocky) Nelson (Founder, President)

Arizona Airways was an Arizona intrastate airline that operated 1946–1948, making substantial losses. About the time it ceased operations, it was federally certificated as a local service carrier to fly smaller routes in Arizona, New Mexico and Texas by the Civil Aeronautics Board (CAB), the now-defunct US federal agency that at the time tightly regulated almost all air transportation in the United States. However, the company was unable to resume service and ultimately, as a non-operating airline, contributed its routes and other assets to a 1 June 1950 three-way merger with Monarch Air Lines and Challenger Airlines to create the original Frontier Airlines.

== History ==
=== Startup ===
Arizona Airways incorporated in Arizona on September 8, 1942. Its president was H.O. Nelson, an engineer and pilot, who went by the name Rocky. The company was originally formed to train Navy pilots during World War II. Other Nelson business interests included holding the local Ercoupe franchise. Robert Goldwater, brother of Barry, was on the company’s board once it recast as an actual airline. The airline ensured that all major parts of the state were represented on its board and this was noted by those outside of Phoenix.

In July 1945, prior to starting airline service, Arizona Airways arranged to buy a moribund, money-losing Transcontinental & Western Air (TWA) route from Phoenix to Las Vegas (both states were then lightly populated; Arizona reached a population of 750,000 in 1950, when Nevada had a population of 160,000 vs 7.2mm and 3.2mm respectively in 2020). TWA stopped flying the route during World War II and did not want to resume it, so arranged to sell the route to Arizona Airways in exchange for $100,000 and the right to become a 20% owner. Arizona Airways needed CAB approval to fly an interstate route. In the meantime, on March 17, 1946, Arizona Airways started intrastate service with a 21-passenger DC-3 featuring a Thunderbird livery, initially on a circular routing that included Tucson, Phoenix and five other points. The CAB held hearings on the TWA deal shortly after. In July, the CAB examiner recommended against the transaction and in February 1947, the CAB Board itself voted to defer a decision on the transaction until the Board settled the general question of air service in Arizona and New Mexico, since that case was also open. The airline had also applied in that case to become a local service carrier, as such airlines were heavily subsidized at the time. So the TWA deal did not help Arizona Airways accelerate CAB certification. In June 1947, Arizona Airways and Bonanza Air Lines, then operating as a Nevada intrastate airline, proposed a merger, but no mention of it was later made in the CAB cases that certificated each airline as a feeder carrier.

=== Apogee, financial distress and sale ===
The airline expanded across Arizona the remainder of 1946 and into 1947 (see Destinations below). In July 1947 it experimented with air freight service to Kingman. However, the airline dropped some southern cities in the second half of 1947 for being unprofitable, and in January 1948, the airline was flying only on one northern route out of Phoenix. The airline enjoyed near constant news coverage, hardly a week went by without at least one article in the Arizona Republic, the state's biggest newspaper, and usually several, often updating progress on the CAB cases. The newspaper often referred to the airline as the "State Airway" or similar. In February 1948, the CAB awarded Arizona Airways four routes from Phoenix, three within Arizona, one across New Mexico to El Paso, Texas. In the airline's favor was it knew the territory and was backed by many of Arizona's "leading businessmen," showing the wisdom of statewide service and board representation. Certification was subject to upgrading airports to Federal standards (radios and other infrastructure) and shoring up its balance sheet, since Arizona Airways had few assets left. The CAB noted the company had covered operating losses with capital raising.

The airline stopped flying on March 1, 1948, Nelson saying it was to allow the company to transition to Federally-sanctioned flying. Communities duly upgraded airports. The CAB issued the certificate in June, but nothing happened thereafter because the airline could not raise more money without existing shareholders being severely diluted, and existing shareholders (who'd invested $335,000) didn't want that. In May 1949, the CAB ordered Arizona Airways into operation by July 1. Finally, in late June Monarch Air Lines said it would buy Arizona Airways. The transaction was filed with the CAB, July 7, 1949. CAB approval took until April 10, 1950, complicated by the fact that Monarch was also purchasing Challenger Airlines. Acquisition terms were modest: 6,000 shares of Monarch stock and assumption of $150,000 in Arizona Airways liabilities. By contrast, Monarch issued about 30,000 shares for Challenger at $10.78 per share, so for an investment of $335,000 in Arizona Airways, shareholders got about $65,000 in Monarch equity. By April 26, Monarch was in possession of Arizona.

Meanwhile, Bonanza Air Lines received its own local service certification in June 1949, which was contingent on TWA transferring to Bonanza the same route (Las Vegas to Phoenix) that it had tried to sell to Arizona Airways in 1945. And in November 1949, Bonanza bought it, for $672.09, far less than the price TWA agreed with Arizona.

The three-way merger creating Frontier Airlines closed on June 1, 1950 and Frontier flew the first flight over the routes Arizona Airways received over two years earlier. Rocky Nelson became a Frontier Vice President but died less than a year later at age 46.

== Fleet ==
Though the airline was not operating, Arizona Airways contributed three DC-3s to the merger.

== Destinations ==
A November 10, 1946 timetable shows the following Arizona destinations:

- Bisbee
- Clifton
- Flagstaff
- Globe
- Grand Canyon
- Kingman
- Nogales
- Phoenix
- Prescott
- Safford
- Tucscon
- Winslow
- Yuma

== See also ==
- List of defunct airlines of the United States
