= Atlantis Airlines (United States) =

American commuter airline

IATA	ICAO	Call sign
SG	AAO	ATLANTIS AIR
- Commenced operations: 1978; 48 years ago
- Ceased operations: 1989; 37 years ago
- Operating bases: Atlanta, Charlotte
- Headquarters: Florence Regional Airport

Atlantis Airlines was a commuter air carrier operating turboprop aircraft in the southeastern U.S. during the 1980s. In 1985 Atlantis began code-sharing with Eastern Air Lines and providing service as Eastern Atlantis Express. Their hubs focused on feeder operations at Atlanta, GA and Charlotte, NC. The airline flew de Havilland Canada DHC-6 Twin Otter and Fairchild Swearingen Metroliner turboprops as well as Piper Navajo prop aircraft in scheduled passenger operations. During their tenure as Eastern Atlantis Express, they flew primarily the British Aerospace BAe Jetstream 31.

In 1980, Atlantis acquired Air Carolina.

== See also ==
- List of defunct airlines of the United States
