= Challenger Airlines =

US airline (1947–1950), merged to form Frontier Airlines

- Founded: 31 December 1941; 83 years ago (incorporated as Summit Airways)
- Commenced operations: 3 May 1947; 78 years ago
- Ceased operations: 31 May 1950; 75 years ago
- Fleet size: 4
- Parent company: Claude Neon
- Headquarters: Laramie, Wyoming; Salt Lake City, Utah; Denver, Colorado; United States
- Key people: Charles W. Hirsig II (Founder); George W. Snyder Jr. (President); Donald A. Duff (President)
- Employees: 200

Challenger Airlines was a local service carrier, a United States scheduled airline certificated to fly smaller routes by the Civil Aeronautics Board (CAB), the now defunct US Federal agency that, at the time, tightly regulated almost all air transport. Challenger merged with two other local service carriers, Monarch Air Lines and Arizona Airways, in 1950 to form the first Frontier Airlines.

== History ==
=== Startup ===
The company was incorporated in Wyoming, December 31, 1941, by Charles W. Hirsig II, as Summit Airways Inc., a fixed base operator located in Laramie. During World War II, Summit trained over 1300 pilots for the US military. On March 28, 1946, the CAB certificated Summit to fly between each of Salt Lake City, Billings, MT, and Denver, CO, in each case via points in Wyoming. Hirsig died 15 January 1945 in a plane crash during the CAB process that resulted in the award to Summit.

A separate company, Challenger Airlines, a Utah intrastate airline, was an unsuccessful applicant in the same CAB case that certificated Summit. Challenger was founded by George W. Snyder, Jr. with a majority stake held by Claude Neon, the company that introduced and popularized neon signs through the patents of its inventor, French engineer Georges Claude. Unable to secure CAB certification for their Utah carrier, Snyder and Claude Neon shut it down in November 1946. They then bought Summit (which had yet to launch airline operations) at the beginning of 1947 and renamed it Challenger.

The new Challenger Airlines started operations on May 3, 1947 with 28-seat DC-3s. By then the company had moved to Salt Lake City. Marketing elements also transferred from the earlier Challenger to the new: the old Challenger called their aircraft Sunliners and so did the new.

=== Consolidation and merger ===
Management changed at the beginning of March 1948, the new president being Donald A. Duff, a former executive at Continental Air Lines, which at that time was located in Denver. Challenger immediately consolidated sales functions with those of Denver-based Monarch Air Lines (another local service carrier), moved the headquarters to Denver in April, and then consolidated maintenance in Denver with Monarch.

The two airlines continued to consolidate operations. By the time Monarch announced the purchase of Challenger in September 1949 (through the purchase of Claude Neon's controlling stake), joint functions also covered stations (i.e. airports) and advertising. The acquisition was responsive to CAB desires, at the time, for mergers; the CAB was under pressure to reduce airline subsidies. Earlier in 1949, the CAB had refused to extend the certification of Florida Airways, another local service carrier, on the grounds of lack of value for government subsidy, and in 1949, Monarch and Challenger had two of the highest ratios of mail revenue to commercial revenue of any of the local service carriers. Monarch had previously announced a merger with Arizona Airways, which had received CAB certification to be a local service carrier, but had not operated as such. So Monarch was effectively asking for CAB blessing for a three way merger. CAB approvals of the mergers were forthcoming in December 1949 (Monarch-Challenger) and April 1950 (Arizona-Monarch). Cost savings were specifically cited as a reason to approve the merger. At the time its merger with Monarch was approved, Challenger had 200 employees, with no job losses expected due to the activation of the moribund Arizona Airways system as part of the merger.

The merger occurred June 1, 1950, with the combined airline called Frontier Airlines. The new airline was by far the largest local service carrier, some calling it a "super feeder", with the route-mileage (i.e. total of the mileage of the authorized routes, without regard to their revenue potential) exceeding of trunk carriers Colonial Airlines, Continental Air Lines, Inland Air Lines, Mid-Continent Airlines, National Airlines, Northeast Airlines, Western Air Lines and the domestic operations of Braniff Airways, a fact that one of the five CAB Board members noted in his dissenting opinion from the approval of the Arizona-Monarch merger. He noted that between them, Challenger and Monarch collected $25 per passenger from the government for every $10 ticket sold, an indication of just how subsidy-dependent were these early local service carriers. Duff became a vice president of the new carrier.

== Fleet ==
Challenger had four DC-3s in service as of December 1949.

== Destinations ==
A Challenger Airlines 1 February 1950 timetable shows the following services, served by routes on the triangle Denver, Salt Lake City and Billings, Montana:

- Billings, Montana
- Casper, Wyoming
- Cheyenne, Wyoming
- Denver, Colorado
- Greeley, Colorado
- Greybull, Wyoming
- Kemmerer, Wyoming
- Laramie, Wyoming
- Powell, Wyoming
- Rawlins, Wyoming
- Riverton, Wyoming
- Rock Springs, Wyoming
- Salt Lake City, Utah
- Vernal, Utah
- Worland, Wyoming

== See also ==
- List of defunct airlines of the United States
