= Avolar (UAL Corporation subsidiary) =

IATA	ICAO	Call sign
—	VLX	—
- Founded: April 21, 2001; 24 years ago
- Ceased operations: March 2, 2002; 23 years ago
- Operating bases: Las Vegas Airport
- Parent company: United Airlines

Avolar (United BizJet Holding, Inc.) was United Airlines' attempt to enter the Fractional Jets market, which had until then been dominated by Netjets. On April 26, 2001, United Airlines said that it was "considering new services to lure high-end travelers out of delayed and crowded airliners and into smaller, more convenient business jets."

According to Aviation Week, Avolar was "the first-ever affiliate of a major airline to enter the fractional fray." According to an article in airlineforecasts.com Avolar had a total of 306 aircraft ordered up until February 2002.

However, after being in existence for less than one year as a UAL subsidiary, and before its first commercial flight, Avolar was shut down by the parent company, UAL Corporation. In a statement issued on March 22, 2002, United Airlines stated that the then "economic downturn and post-Sept. 11 drop in demand made this venture unprofitable."

Financially, in connection with the closing of Avolar, UAL recorded a charge of $82 million in the first quarter 2002, which represented advance payments on aircraft purchases, severance costs, termination fees and expenses in support of the business and its shutdown.

== See also ==
- List of defunct airlines of the United States
