= Westlake, Seattle =

Neighborhood in Seattle

Coordinates: 47°37′54″N 122°20′28″W

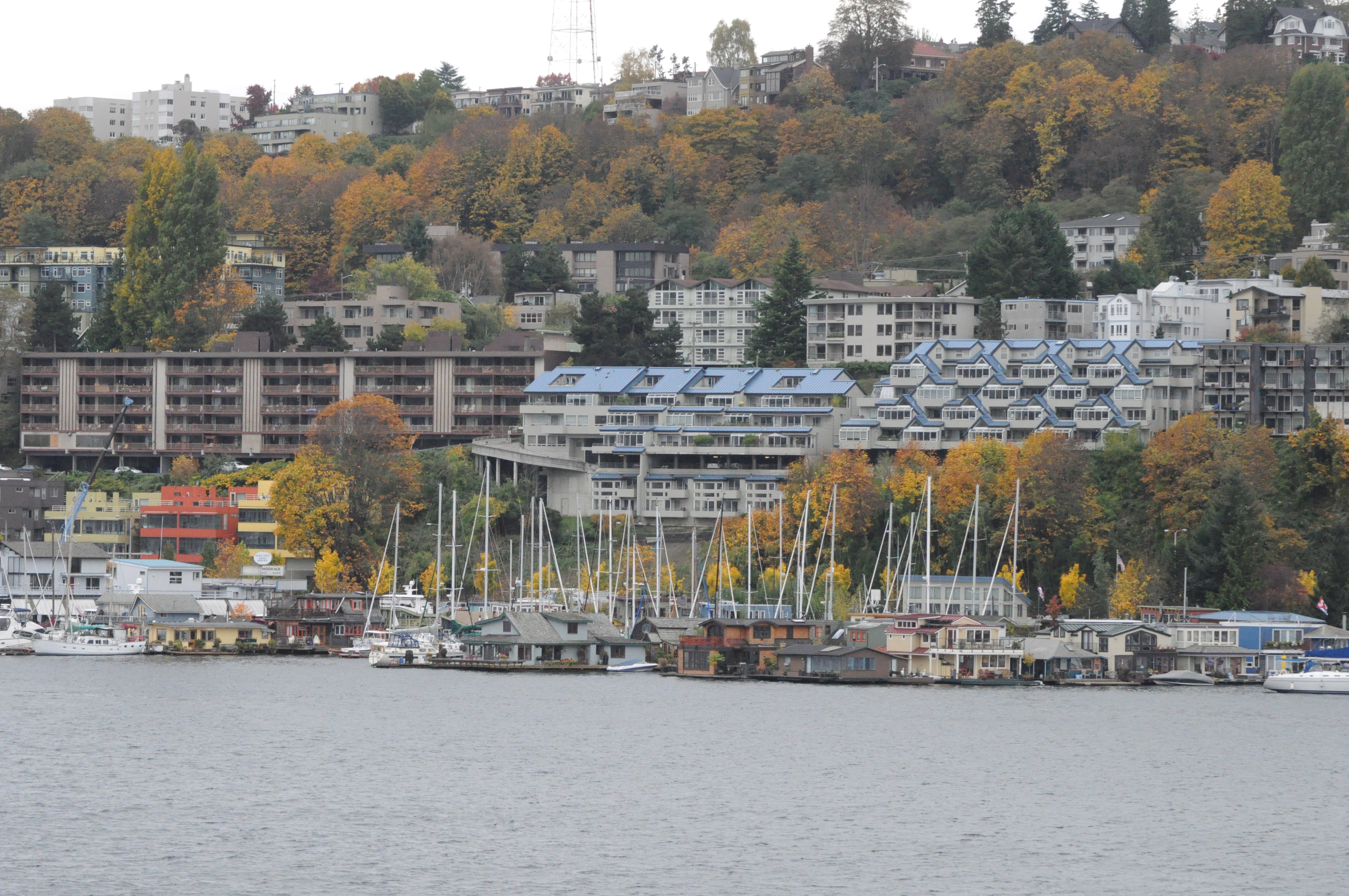
Westlake, 2009

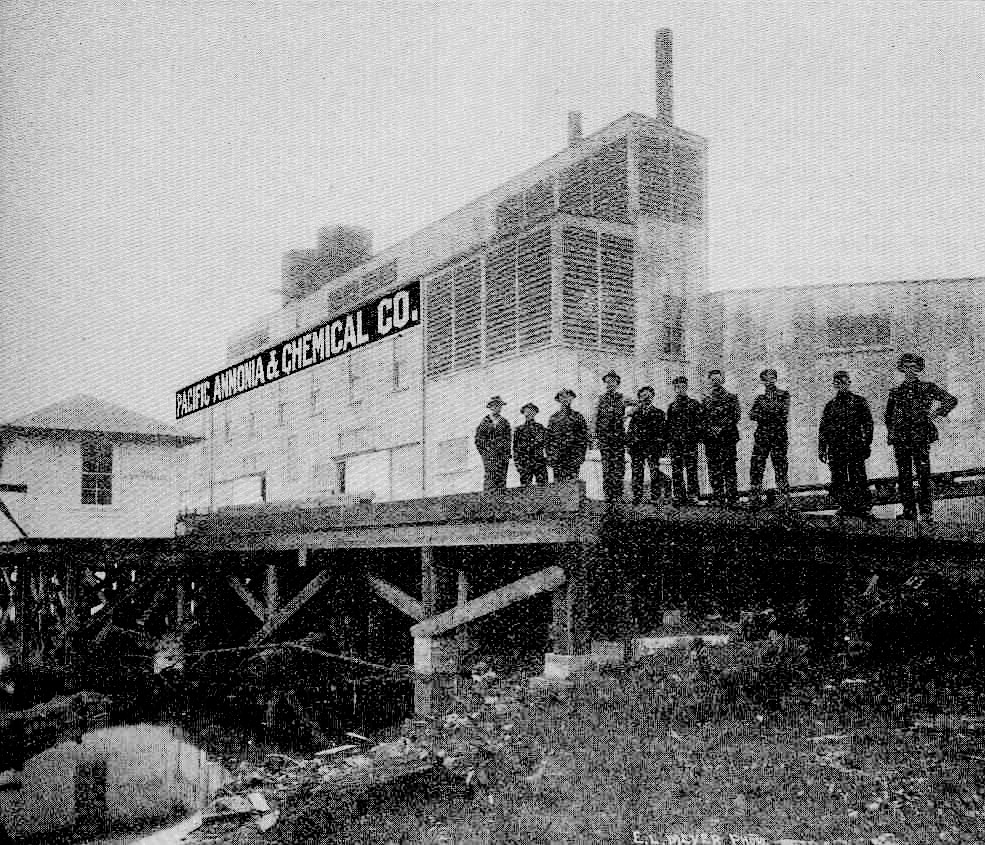
Industrialized Westlake a century earlier (1909)

Westlake is a neighborhood in Seattle, Washington. It was named after its location on the western shore of Lake Union. It is a relatively narrow neighborhood, there being only a few blocks between the shoreline and its western limit at Aurora Avenue N., beyond which is Queen Anne. To the south beyond Aloha Street is South Lake Union, and to the north across the Fremont Cut is Fremont. Its main thoroughfares are Dexter and Westlake Avenues N. (north- and southbound).

Tom Hanks's character in Sleepless in Seattle lived in a Westlake houseboat.

Prior to its merger with Bonanza Air Lines and Pacific Air Lines to create Air West, West Coast Airlines had its headquarters in Westlake.
