= Big Bunny =

Big Bunny may refer to:

- A DC-9 jet owned by Playboy Enterprises from 1970 to 1976 and managed for a time by Purdue Airlines
- A Flash cartoon series created by Amy Winfrey

Similar Names:

- Big Buck Bunny, a short animated comedy film by the Blender Institute
- Big House Bunny, a 1948 Looney Tunes Bugs Bunny cartoon
- Big Top Bunny, a 1951 Looney Tunes Bugs Bunny cartoon
