= Purdue Airlines =

US charter airline part-owned by Purdue University (1968-1971)

Purdue University has a history of operating airlines directly or through affiliates, including:

- charter operations of its own through wholly owned non-profit Purdue Aeronautics Corporation
- being briefly certificated by the US government to operate scheduled service through Purdue Aeronautics
- separately briefly owning another scheduled airline, Mid-West Airlines
- contributing its name to a part-owned for-profit charter jet airline, Purdue Airlines

The collapse of Purdue Airlines in 1971 happened just as Southwest Airlines was in its startup phase. Southwest hired Purdue's pilot corps and certain other employees, speeding its start.

== History ==
=== Purdue's own non-profit airline ===
Purdue Aeronautics Corporation
IATA	ICAO	Call sign
—	PUR	PURDUE
- Commenced operations: 1953
- Ceased operations: 30 April 1968
- Operating bases: Purdue Airport
- Fleet size: 6
- Parent company: Purdue University
- Headquarters: Lafayette, Indiana, United States

Purdue Aeronautics Corporation was established in 1942 as an affiliate to Purdue University's Aviation Technology program. It was a non-profit corporation dedicated to aeronautical research and education with programs in aviation maintenance, avionics, and the training of professional pilots and aircraft technicians. From 1953, Purdue Aeronautics held charter air service authority from the Civil Aeronautics Board (CAB). The CAB was a now-defunct Federal agency that then tightly regulated almost all airline service in the United States. Purdue Aeronautics primarily provided interstate civilian charter services but in the 1960s also provided some military charters. Purdue Aeronautics operated from Purdue University Airport in Lafayette, Indiana, eventually with DC-3 and later DC-6 aircraft. See External links for photos of Purdue DC-3 and DC-6 aircraft. In 1963 the airline generated over $1mm in annual revenue (over $10mm in 2024 dollars). It was known for carrying college and professional sports teams. This charter business existed until Purdue Aeronautics contributed its CAB certificate to Purdue Airlines in 1968, as discussed below. Purdue Aeronautics as a corporate entity appears to have been dissolved in 1974.

=== Scheduled service ===
In 1949, Purdue Aeronautics was certificated by the CAB to offer scheduled service from Chicago to Lafayette for a three-year period, or until Turner Airlines, the airline that had already received certification for the route, was ready to operate. The operation was to be staffed in part by Purdue University students, including some pilots. The application showed that Purdue at the time had a fleet of 21 aircraft, mainly single engine types, but including at least two twin engine aircraft, a Beech 18 and a Lockheed Electra. Purdue Aeronautics started service from Lafayette to Chicago on 23 November 1949 and operated the shuttle service until Turner Airlines started Lafayette-Chicago service on January 30, 1950. Turner Airlines was a local service carrier that changed its name to Lake Central Airlines later in 1950. In 1968, Lake Central merged into Allegheny Airlines, the ancestor of US Airways, the major airline that was purchased by American Airlines in 2015.

=== Ownership of Mid-West Airlines ===
In November 1951, the CAB approved the purchase by Purdue Research Foundation (PRF), an affiliate of Purdue University, of another local service carrier, Des Moines, Iowa-based Mid-West Airlines. Mid-West was one of the smallest of the CAB airlines, flying single-engine aircraft across Nebraska, South Dakota, Iowa and Minnesota. The CAB approved the purchase over the objections of Lake Central, United Airlines and Mid-Continent Airlines, the latter a trunk carrier that was later folded into Braniff Airways.

PRF planned to invest $1 million into the airline (over $11mm in 2024 dollars) to upgrade Mid-West to fly Douglas DC-3s, the aircraft then becoming prevalent among most local service carriers, and entered into an agreement to purchase 10 DC-3s from Eastern Air Lines. However, in April 1952, less than six months after allowing PRF to buy Mid-West, the CAB voted to decline to renew the certificate of the airline, forcing it to liquidate. The CAB cited two main reasons, economics the bigger of the two: the Federal government subsidized local service carriers and CAB projections showed Mid-West DC-3 service would be far more expensive to subsidize than any other local service carrier. A second reason was that upgraded Mid-West service would provide direct competition to United Airlines on some routes, which was held to be undesirable. The five member Board split 3-2 on the decision and the two members in the minority wrote lengthy dissenting opinions, detailing how, in their view, the PRF plan made sense and that there was ample reason to expect Mid-West's fortunes to recover. However, Mid-West's existing results were even worse than those of Florida Airways, a local service carrier whose certificate the CAB declined to renew in 1949.

PRF's aircraft purchase contracts were contingent on receiving renewal of the Mid-West certificate. The Foundation said that by liquidating the carrier it would be able to easily recoup the money it had spent to acquire it. Mid-West flew its last flight May 15, 1952.

=== For-profit charter airline ===
Purdue Airlines
IATA	ICAO	Call sign
—	PUR	PURDUE
- Commenced operations: 1 May 1968
- Ceased operations: 30 April 1971
- Operating bases: Purdue Airport
- Fleet size: 3
- Parent company: Stephens Inc. Purdue University
- Headquarters: Lafayette, Indiana, United States

In 1968, the CAB approved (including the required signature of President Lyndon B. Johnson) the formation of Purdue Airlines, a for-profit supplemental air carrier - the term the US government uses to denote charter operations. The airline was 80% controlled by Stephens, the Arkansas investment bank, which contributed $800,000, with Purdue Aeronautics Corporation contributing its operating certificate to the airline and retaining a 20% stake. Jackson T. Stephens was chairman of the board, Purdue president Frederick L. Hovde was also a member. At the time, Purdue Aeronautics (which remained a non-profit corporation wholly owned by the university) had four DC-3s and two DC-6 aircraft. Part of the justification was to give Purdue University students access to modern jet equipment, which Purdue Aeronautics could not otherwise afford. Operations started May 1, 1968. The airline's certification authorized it to offer charter services in the United States and Canada. In 1969, the airline took delivery of its first DC-9 aircraft, the first of three it ultimately flew. Under an agreement between Purdue Airlines and the university, Purdue students continued to have the ability to gain technical experience at the airline.

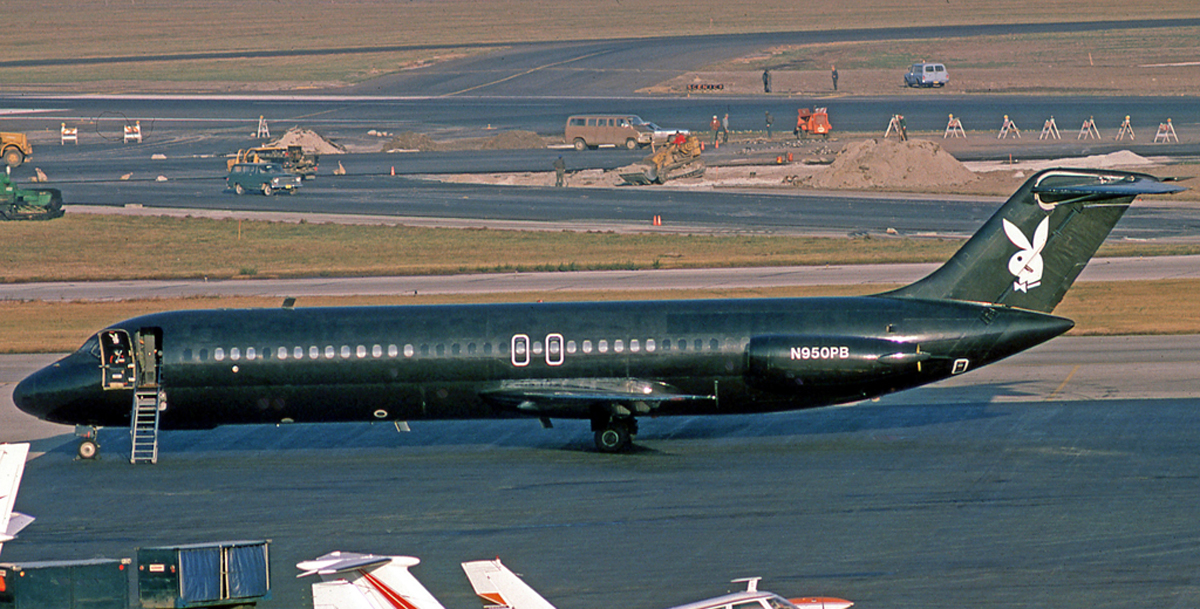
Big Bunny. See External links for a link to a Purdue Airlines aircraft photo

The airline was famous for operating and maintaining Playboy founder Hugh Hefner's private aircraft, also a DC-9, named "The Big Bunny" - painted black with the Playboy bunny logo on the tail, which was based at Purdue University Airport and available (though apparently rarely used) for charter use by the airline.

In early 1971, Stephens made the decision to shutter the airline by April 30. By then, continued investment into the airline by Stephens had reduced the university's stake in the airline to only 3%. The timing was fortuitous for Southwest Airlines, which was working towards its first flight. Southwest hired the entire of the Purdue Airlines pilot corps, over 20 people, and certain other Purdue Airline employees, speeding Southwest's launch.

== Accidents and incidents ==
- On November 29, 1963 a Purdue Aeronautics Corporation DC-3, N386T, struck terrain while landing at Morgantown, West Virginia due to pilot error during an attempted instrument approach, killing the flight attendant and destroying the aircraft. The aircraft was being ferried from Lafayette.

== See also ==
- Supplemental air carrier
- List of defunct airlines of the United States
