= Local service carrier =

Airline type created/regulated by US govt 1943–1978

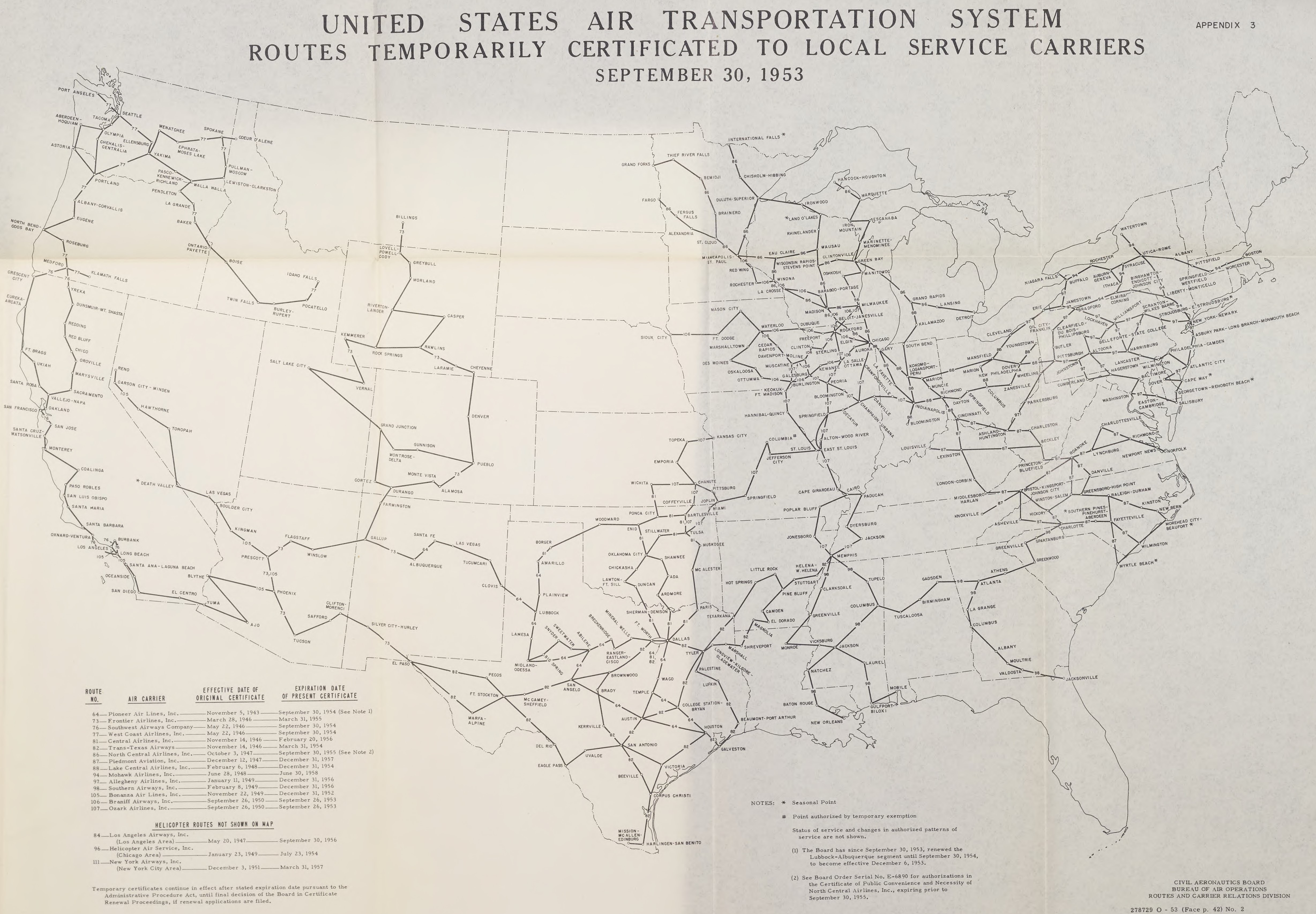
1953 US local service airline network. Map key in lower left-hand corner. 1953 was after the CAB withdrew certificates of Florida Airways, E.W. Wiggins and Mid-West, resulting no routes on map in Florida, most of New England and Nebraska/S. Dakota respectively. Trunk carrier Braniff appears in map because in 1952 it bought fellow trunk carrier Mid-Continent, which received feeder routes in 1950. Braniff also had trunk routes: see similar 1953 map in trunk carrier article. Feeder certificates became permanent in 1955. See article.

Local service carriers, or local service airlines, originally known as feeder carriers or feeder airlines, were a category of domestic airlines in the United States, as regulated by the Civil Aeronautics Board (CAB), the federal agency that tightly regulated the airline industry from 1938 to 1978.

Initially 23 such airlines were certified from 1943 to 1949 to serve smaller US domestic markets unserved/poorly served by existing domestic carriers, the trunk carriers, which flew the main, or trunk, routes. However, not all of these started operation and some that did later had their certificates withdrawn. One other carrier was certificated in 1950 as a replacement. "Feeder airline" alludes to another purpose, that such airlines would feed passengers to trunk carriers. It was expected that a significant number of passenger itineraries would involve a connection between a local service carrier and a trunk carrier.

Local service carriers ultimately became substantial carriers in their own right, all such carriers flew jet aircraft by the end of the regulated era (1978). Over time, local service carriers began to compete more directly with trunk carriers. But a clear distinction, visible in financial and operating data, continued to exist between the two types of domestic carriers through the end of the regulated era, reflecting a difference in how the CAB regulated the two types of carriers. In particular, in contrast to trunk carriers, local service airlines received government subsidies throughout the regulated era. But after US airline deregulation in 1979, the distinction between trunk and local service carriers vanished.

== History ==
=== Context ===
The passage of the Civil Aeronautics Act of 1938 put almost all US commercial air transport under the tight control of a newly formed federal agency, the Civil Aeronautics Authority (CAA). In 1940, those regulatory functions passed to another federal agency, the Civil Aeronautics Board (CAB). With the exception of intrastate airlines, only airlines certificated by the CAA/CAB could engage in scheduled air transport. Airlines that could show they were flying scheduled service before the passage of the 1938 Act were entitled to certification by grandfathering. 19 domestic passenger airlines were certificated in this way. The 16 of these that continued to operate after World War II were called the trunk carriers or trunk airlines. In many respects, the CAB regulated the industry in the interests of the trunk carriers.

Table 1: Feeder/local service carriers certificated 1943–1950(1) Arizona Airways failed to operate certificated service
Final name	Name at first operation	Name at initial certification	Date of initial certification	Disposition
Pioneer Air Lines	Essair	Essair	5 November 1943	Merged into Continental 1955
Florida Airways	Florida Airways	Orlando Airlines	28 March 1946	Certificate withdrawn 1949
Monarch Air Lines	Monarch Air Lines	Ray Wilson, Inc.	28 March 1946	Merged into Frontier 1950
Challenger Airlines	Challenger Airlines	Summit Airways	28 March 1946	Merged into Frontier 1950
Empire Airlines	Empire Airlines	Empire Airlines	22 May 1946	Merged into West Coast 1952
West Coast Airlines	West Coast Airlines	West Coast Airlines	22 May 1946	Merged into Air West 1968
Pacific Air Lines	Southwest Airways	Southwest Airways	22 May 1946	Merged into Air West 1968
E.W. Wiggins Airways	E.W. Wiggins Airways	E.W. Wiggins Airways	13 June 1946	Certificate withdrawn 1953
Central Air Lines	Central Air Lines	Central Air Lines	14 November 1946	Merged into Frontier 1967
Texas International Airlines	Trans-Texas Airways	Aviation Enterprises	14 November 1946	Merged into Continental 1982
North Central Airlines	Wisconsin Central Airlines	Wisconsin Central Airlines	19 December 1946	Merged into Republic 1979
Parks Air Lines	Parks Air Lines	Parks Air Transport	19 December 1946	Merged into Ozark 1950
Mid-West Airlines	Mid-West Airlines	Iowa Airplane Company	19 December 1946	Certificate withdrawn 1952
Piedmont Airlines	Piedmont Airlines	Piedmont Aviation	4 April 1947	Merged into USAir 1989
Southern Airways	Southern Airways	Southern Airways	4 April 1947	Merged into Republic 1979
		Air Commuting	7 May 1947	Never operated: certificate expired
Lake Central Airlines	Turner Airlines	Roscoe Turner; Aeronautical Corporation	3 September 1947	Merged into Allegheny 1968
		Yellow Cab Company of Cleveland	3 September 1947	Never operated: certificate expired
Arizona Airways	^{(1)}	Arizona Airways	13 February 1948	Merged into Frontier 1950
Allegheny Airlines	All American Airways	All-American Aviation	19 February 1948	Sold to America West 2005
Mohawk Airlines	Robinson Airlines	Robinson Aviation	19 February 1948	Merged into Allegheny 1972
		Island Air Ferries	19 February 1948	Never operated: certificate expired
Bonanza Airlines	Bonanza Airlines	Bonanza Airlines	15 June 1949	Merged into Air West 1968
Purdue Aeronautics; Corporation	Purdue Aeronautics; Corporation	Purdue Aeronautics; Corporation	28 July 1949	Stopgap service only
Ozark Air Lines	Ozark Air Lines	Ozark Air Lines	28 July 1950	Merged into TWA 1986

=== Essair and the Local Service case ===
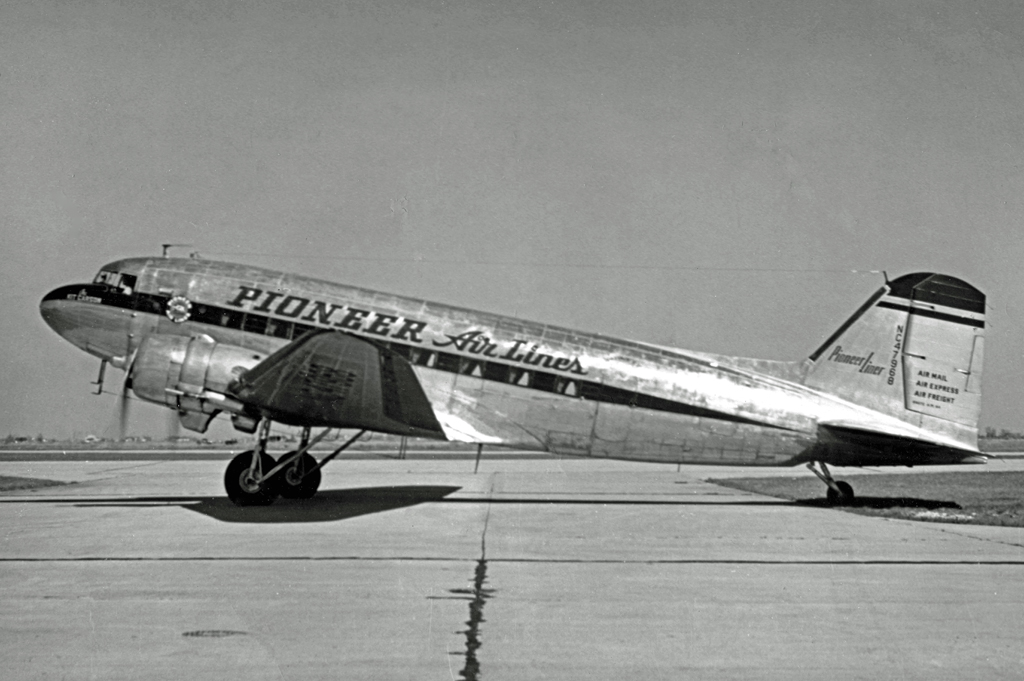
Pioneer Air Lines Douglas DC-3 in 1948

In November 1943, the CAB certificated Houston-based Essair (later called Pioneer Air Lines) to fly feeder routes in Texas, the first airline to be certificated to fly domestic passengers since the grandfathering of the trunk carriers. Essair started feeder service on 1 August 1945 on a route from Houston to Amarillo, Texas via many intermediate points. The CAB regarded this as an experiment so Essair's certification was temporary. The airline would need to renew its certificate in three years.

In the meantime, prompted by the Essair certification, the CAB initiated a case, published July 1944, to consider local air service nationally. Politicians, business groups, would-be airlines and others pushed for such airlines, although the CAB and the post office (which at the time subsidized air transport through airmail contracts) were "not enthusiastic." By January 1944, the CAB had received 435 applications by would-be feeder airlines. The Board saw itself obligated by the 1938 Act to expand air service to smaller markets. The Board was not confident feeder service could be provided on a cost-efficient basis by the trunks, therefore the CAB decided to certificate new carriers, with the idea they would become specialists in serving small routes efficiently. By giving them temporary certificates, the increased subsidies for providing local service was also theoretically temporary. The CAB may also not have wanted to risk the progress trunk carriers made in evolving towards subsidy-free operation.

=== Certificating new feeder airlines ===
Even before it published its local service findings, the CAB launched a series of cases to certificate new feeder carriers across the contiguous United States. The CAB separately certificated "territorial" airlines for Hawaii and Alaska which, at the time, were territories not states. 14 feeder cases completed during the timeframe 1946–1949, awarding an additional 22 new entities (beyond Pioneer) feeder service certificates covering most of the contiguous United States. These certificates were temporary and conditional. Successful local service applicants had to demonstrate access to the funding they claimed to have, and that a sufficient number of airports had necessary infrastructure (e.g. sufficiently long runways, radios, etc.) to handle commercial service.

Cases could take well over a year, sometimes longer, to decide (note the gap between when the CAB launched the cases in 1944 and the publishing of the first case in spring 1946) typically had over a dozen applicants and other participants, public hearings, an initial finding by an examiner, followed by the decision of the full five-member Board. Each case usually certificated one or more new local service carriers and might also allocate longer routes in the same region to trunks. For instance, the March 1946 decision in the Service in the Rocky Mountain States Area case (which launched in the summer of 1944) certificated two new feeder lines (soon to adopt the names Monarch Air Lines and Challenger Airlines) splitting local routes across Montana, Wyoming, Colorado, Utah and New Mexico, while awarding additional routes in the same region to Western Air Lines and Inland Air Lines, two trunk carriers. Some airlines won routes in multiple cases. Parks Air Lines, for instance, won routes in three. One later case allocated routes only to feeders previously certificated in earlier cases. A cleanup case re-awarded routes to Southern Airways that the CAB was not confident had been properly awarded previously. CAB decisions could be challenged in Federal courts and some feeder certifications were (such as the original case certificating Essair). The CAB did not distribute route authorities to feeders equally. The size of the Parks Air Lines network was over eight times the size of the Florida Airways network, for instance.

Among successful applicants, All-American Aviation (later Allegheny Airlines, the predecessor to US Airways) was unique because it already had CAB-certification. The CAB certificated All American for “pick-up” service in 1940 – All American picked up mail without landing through use of a device to hook mailbags in flight. This certification was de-novo, rather than grandfathered, but valid only for mail and freight.

=== Failure to launch ===
Some applicants failed to launch service at all. In the case of three applicants with unusual business plans, certification eventually expired or was revoked due to failure to operate:

- Air Commuting won a certificate for seaplane service from New York City but never launched, with its certification lapsing. Later it unsuccessfully applied for New York City helicopter service certification in the case that was won by New York Airways.
- Island Air Ferries won a certificate to provide low-frills service across Long Island Sound from Long Island to Connecticut, as a substitute for ferry service. The CAB declined to extend certification past its original term.
- Yellow Cab Company of Cleveland won a certificate to provide helicopter service in Cleveland. This never launched and the certificate expired.

Arizona Airways failed to launch as a feeder carrier but avoided certificate revocation.

The airline flew (1946–1948) as an Arizona intrastate airline before winning a feeder certificate for routes in Arizona, New Mexico and Texas. But intrastate service exhausted its capital. The airline ceased operating while preparing for feeder service, was unable to raise funding, and the CAB threatened to revoke its certificate. At the last minute, the carrier, still grounded, agreed to a takeover by Monarch Air Lines. This turned into a three-way merger with the addition of Challenger Airlines, resulting in the creation of the original Frontier Airlines in 1950 as one of the largest local service carriers, flying small routes from the Mexican to Canadian borders in the mountain states.

=== Parks, Ozark and Mid-Continent ===
Parks Air Lines routes certificated by the Civil Aeronautics Board

Parks Air Lines received routes in three CAB cases, leaving it with a feeder network deemed one of the richest. But it was unable to raise funds. The airline proposed a series of launch alternatives the CAB found unacceptable, leading to the CAB revoking the company's certification in 1950. The CAB awarded most of Parks's routes to a new feeder carrier, Ozark Air Lines, making Ozark the last feeder to be certificated. The CAB awarded the remaining Parks routes to Mid-Continent Airlines, a trunk carrier, a controversial decision since feeder and trunk airlines were supposed to be separate.

Shortly before the CAB's revocation, Parks started service on a single route. After litigation failed to stop the CAB from moving forward, Parks sold itself to Ozark. Since Ozark had no airline operation at the time, Parks essentially became Ozark.

=== Purdue stopgap ===
In 1949, Purdue Aeronautics Corporation (PAC), a Purdue University subsidiary, was awarded stopgap certification for a single route, Chicago-Lafayette, Indiana. The route authority was held by feeder airline Turner Airlines, shortly to become Lake Central Airlines, which was slow starting service. PAC flew the route for just over two months in late 1949 and early 1950 until Turner was ready to go. That was the end of Purdue University's brief time operating a Federally-certificated scheduled airline, but two years later, Purdue played a role in the fate of Mid-West Airlines, as detailed below.

=== Failure to renew ===
Feeder certificates were initially temporary, subject to renewal every three years. This was not just for show; the CAB declined to renew the certificates of three feeders, Florida Airways in 1949, Mid-West in 1952 and E.W. Wiggins Airways in 1953. The issue was economics; the CAB deemed unacceptable the amount of government subsidy required to keep the airlines operating.

In the case of Mid-West, another subsidiary of Purdue University bought the carrier in 1951, with a plan to substantially upgrade the airline (e.g. moving from single-engined aircraft to Douglas DC-3s). The CAB allowed Purdue to buy the airline, but then refused to renew its certificate the next year.

Florida Airways and Mid-West went out of business as a result of losing their certificates. The scheduled passenger operations of E.W. Wiggins were part of a larger business and the company is still a going concern as of 2024, operating as a feeder cargo carrier for UPS Airlines and Fedex Express since the 1980s.

=== Advent of commuter airlines ===
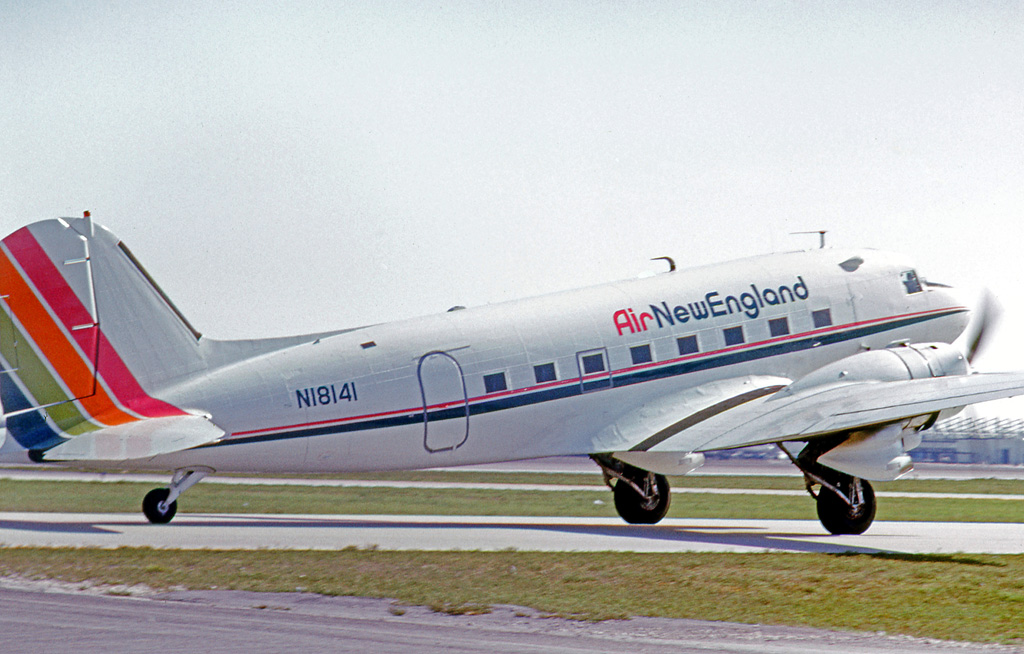
Air New England DC-3 at Miami in 1974

In 1952, early in the development of feeder airlines, the CAB chose to deregulate airlines flying "small aircraft". This was formalized in Part 298 of the Board's economic regulations, which gave blanket authorization for airlines operating an aircraft with a maximum gross takeoff weight of 12,500 lbs or less. Such airlines were originally known as scheduled air taxis, later as commuter airlines or Part 298 carriers. This effectively created a new category of airline underneath the local service carriers. In 1972 the CAB expanded the aircraft size limit to include those of 30 passengers or fewer, with a payload of less than 7,500 lbs. Such carriers did have to obtain Federal Aviation Administration operational/safety certification but were otherwise able to fly wherever they pleased. The CAB would, on occasion, also exempt commuter operators to operate aircraft larger than the limits. For instance, in 1971, it exempted Executive Airlines and Air New England (at that time a commuter carrier) to fly propeller aircraft up to 44 seats to expand service in New England.

=== Permanent certificates ===
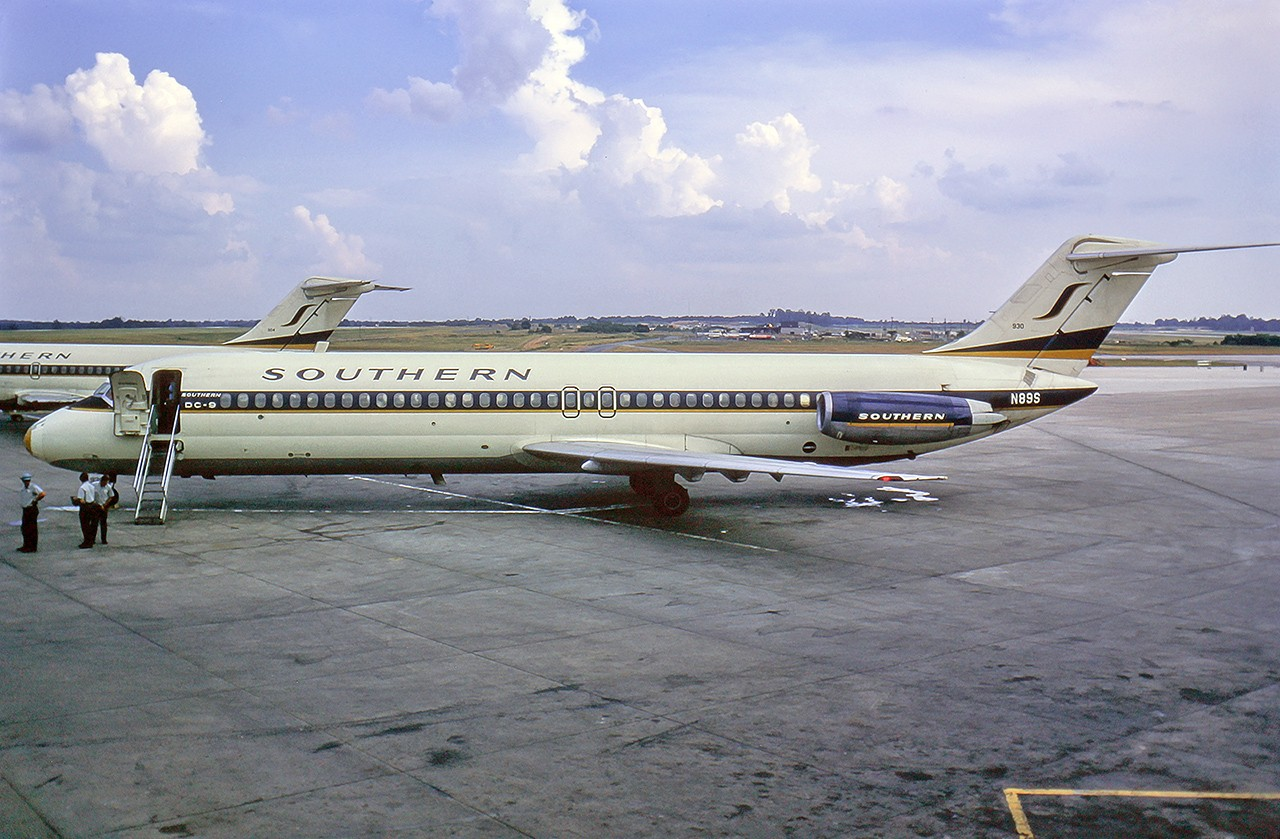
Southern DC-9 Birmingham 1973

In 1955, the US Congress forced the CAB to make the certificates of these carriers permanent (Public Law 38, enacted May 19, 1955 amending the Civil Aeronautics Act of 1938). This was done against the wishes of the CAB; it had made "elaborate promises" to the trunks that local service carriers would never be able to "come into full competitive status". (see "Trunks, the protected class" below). Prior to permanent certificates, the uncertainty of their regulatory status made it impossible for local service carriers to borrow on a long-term basis. Consequently, the carriers were largely equity funded prior to permanent certificates.

=== Role ===
CAB-regulated airlines interlined with every other carrier (which was done with CAB approval through a subsidiary of the Air Transport Association, at the time the club for all the CAB air carriers). It was normal for passenger itineraries to involve a ticket on more than one airline. No airline offered comprehensive service because the CAB intentionally limited competition. This can be seen in statistics for the local service carrier connections. In 1964, over 40% of passengers on local service carriers were on a ticket connecting to another airline.

=== Trunks, the protected class ===
The CAB saw the trunks as a special category of airline to be particularly protected:

- Until shortly before deregulation, the CAB did not authorize a single airline to compete with trunklines on an equal basis.
- Once the trunk airlines were certificated, the CAB's view was their number comprised a sufficient number of airlines, no others were needed.
- The CAB took particular care to ensure local service carriers did not compete with the trunk carriers, seeing itself as having an obligation to the trunks to protect them from competition.

Over time, local service carriers did come to compete with trunk carriers to a degree. In permitting local service carriers to enter some trunk routes, the CAB was motivated in significant part by a desire reduce government subsidy paid to local service carriers, a process known as “route strengthening.” The first time a local service carrier went head-to-head with a trunk was in 1957, when the CAB allowed Mohawk to compete with American Airlines on the Syracuse-New York City route.

Further, some local service carrier routes were assigned to trunks. As previously noted, in 1950, some of the routes originally awarded to Parks Air Lines, a local service carrier, were handed to Mid-Continent Airlines, a trunk, after Parks failed to start operation in a timely manner. And in 1955, the CAB permitted a trunk airline to buy a local service carrier, when Continental Air Lines bought Pioneer. So the division between local service carriers and trunks was far from absolute.

=== Air New England: not a local service carrier ===
In 1974, the CAB certificated a new domestic carrier, Air New England (ANE), to placate New England politicians, business groups and citizens who felt they deserved to have a certificated carrier fly small routes in New England (as opposed to relying on unregulated commuter operators). These routes were previously flown by Northeast Airlines, a small trunk carrier that Delta Air Lines bought in 1972. ANE was initially nationally reported as the first new local service carrier since Ozark in 1950. Initially the CAB regulated ANE as such, but in 1976 ANE was relabeled as something new in the CAB taxonomy, a "regional carrier". The clear intent of the CAB when it certificated ANE was to keep it focused on small New England routes. Oddly, when the CAB came to create a specific regional certificate for ANE, it found the existing form of ANE's certificate was that of a trunk, not a local service carrier.

=== Aspiring to be big ===
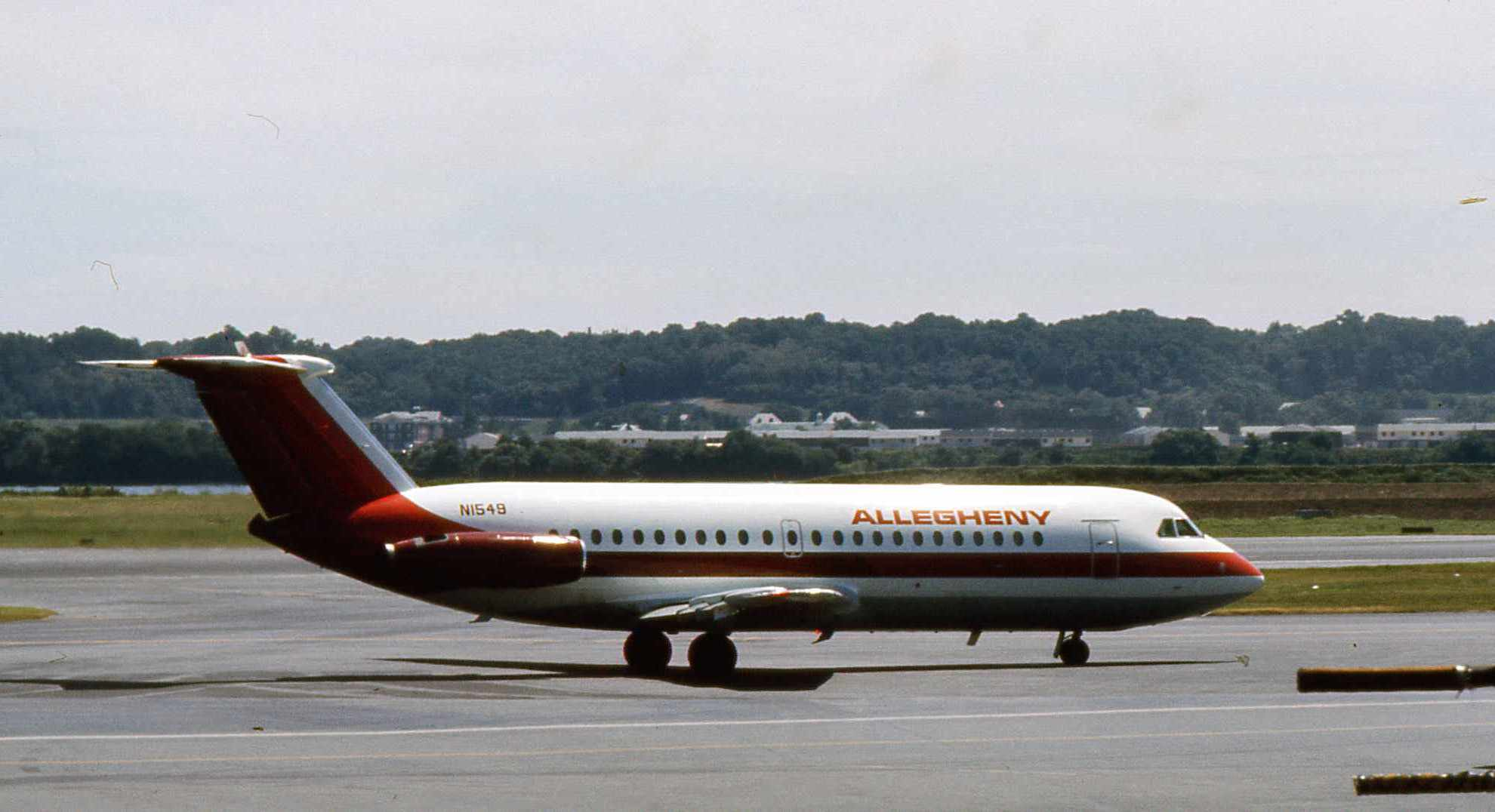
Allegheny Airlines BAC 1-11 in 1975, part of one of the "largest jet fleets in the world"

Local service carriers aspired to be seen as “big” airlines. For instance, in the mid-1970s, Allegheny, the largest of the local service carriers, ran an advertising campaign “It takes a big airline”, comparing itself to the trunks, and it adopted a tag-line “did you know Allegheny is that big?” Ads noted Allegheny:

- Flew more annual flights than TWA
- Flew more annual passengers than Pan Am
- Flew to more cities than American Airlines
- Had one of the largest jet fleets in the world

However, as Table 2 shows, the distinction between trunk airline and local service airline remained obvious all the way to 1978, the last year of the regulated era. Relative to local service carriers, even the smallest trunk airlines flew substantially greater seat-miles and distances and with substantially larger aircraft.

=== Local service carrier events during regulated era ===
- 1943–1949: CAB certificates 23 feeder/local service airlines
- Air Commuter, Island Air Ferries and Yellow Cab of Cleveland certificates never used and either expire or are revoked.
- The CAB withdraws certifications of Florida Airways (1949), Mid-West (1952) and E.W. Wiggins (1953).
- 1950: Monarch, Challenger and Arizona Airways merge to create Frontier.
- 1950: Parks Air Lines merges into Ozark Air Lines.
- 1952: Empire merges into West Coast.
- 1952: Robinson Airlines changes its name to Mohawk Airlines
- 1952: Wisconsin Central changes name to North Central Airlines.
- 1953: All American Airways changes name to Allegheny Airlines.
- 1955: Pioneer merges into trunk airline Continental Air Lines
- 1958: Southwest Airways changes name to Pacific Air Lines
- 1967: Central merges into Frontier
- 1968: Three-way merger of Bonanza, Pacific and West Coast creates Air West
- 1968: Lake Central merges into Allegheny
- 1969: Trans-Texas Airways changes name to Texas International Airlines
- 1970: Air West becomes Hughes Air Corporation dba Hughes Airwest
- 1972: Mohawk merges into Allegheny

These events left eight local service carriers in 1978 as shown in Table 2.

=== Former local service carrier events after 1979 US airline deregulation ===
- 1979: Allegheny changes its name to USAir
- 1979: North Central buys Southern, creating Republic Airlines
- 1980: Texas Air formed as Texas International holding company. Texas Air came to control about 20% of the US airline industry during the 1980s
- 1980: Republic Airlines buys Hughes Airwest
- 1982: Texas Air merges Texas International into former trunk carrier Continental Airlines.
- 1985: New entrant People Express buys Frontier, operates it as a separate subsidiary
- 1985: Piedmont agrees to buy new entrant Empire Airlines
- 1986: Frontier shuts down. It merged into Continental in 1987.
- 1986: USAir agrees to buy former intrastate airline Pacific Southwest Airlines (PSA)
- 1986: Northwest Airlines agrees to buy Republic
- 1986: Trans World Airlines agrees to buy Ozark.
- 1987: USAir agrees to buy Piedmont. On completion of this merger in 1989, USAir becomes the sole remaining former local service carrier. Piedmont and USAir were considered two of the most successful airlines in the decade following deregulation, but USAir subsequently lost $3bn in six years of losses from 1989 to 1994.
- 1997: USAir changes its name to US Airways
- 2005: America West Airlines buys bankrupt US Airways, assuming the name of the larger carrier.
- 2013: US Airways agrees to buy bankrupt American Airlines, assuming the name of the larger carrier.

Table 2: 1978 CAB-regulated trunk and local service carriers, including revenues and select statistics(1) USD mm(2) Available Seat Miles: an ASM is one seat available for sale flown one mile(3) Average seats per flight weighted by miles flown(4) Average flight distance
Airline	Airline type	Op rev^{(1)}	Sched ASMs (bn)^{(2)}	Avg Seats/ Mile^{(3)}	Stage length (mi)^{(4)}
American Airlines	trunk	2,736.4	45.49	154.2	799.8
Braniff Airways	trunk	966.5	17.84	138.5	583.1
Continental Air Lines	trunk	772.0	14.53	155.2	618.5
Delta Air Lines	trunk	2,241.6	37.55	151.5	457.9
Eastern Air Lines	trunk	2,379.6	39.06	135.5	509.1
National Airlines	trunk	636.4	13.83	174.1	694.5
Northwest Airlines	trunk	794.4	14.30	226.2	667.2
Trans World Airlines	trunk	2,474.7	42.65	165.0	897.1
United Air Lines	trunk	3,523.4	61.94	161.2	694.8
Western Air Lines	trunk	834.5	15.76	147.9	645.6
Allegheny Airlines	local svc	566.8	6.72	90.4	242.5
Frontier Airlines	local svc	287.2	3.77	81.6	230.2
Hughes Air Corp dba Hughes Airwest	local svc	313.2	4.18	94.6	282.0
North Central Airlines	local svc	298.5	3.09	90.0	147.6
Ozark Air Lines	local svc	229.7	2.70	87.3	195.9
Piedmont Airlines	local svc	205.6	2.62	85.7	180.7
Southern Airways	local svc	188.5	2.45	76.0	206.5
Texas International Airlines	local svc	181.7	2.60	90.8	304.5

== Legacy ==
As of 2024, American Airlines is the corporate successor to the following original local service certificates:

- Allegheny
- Lake Central
- Mohawk
- Ozark
- Parks
- Piedmont

As of 2024, Delta Air Lines is the corporate successor to the following original local service certificates:

- Bonanza
- Empire
- Southern
- Southwest Airways
- West Coast
- Wisconsin Central

As of 2024, United Airlines is the corporate successor to the following original local service certificates:

- Arizona Airways
- Central
- Challenger
- Monarch
- Pioneer
- Trans-Texas
