= Purdue University Airport =

Airport in Indiana, United States

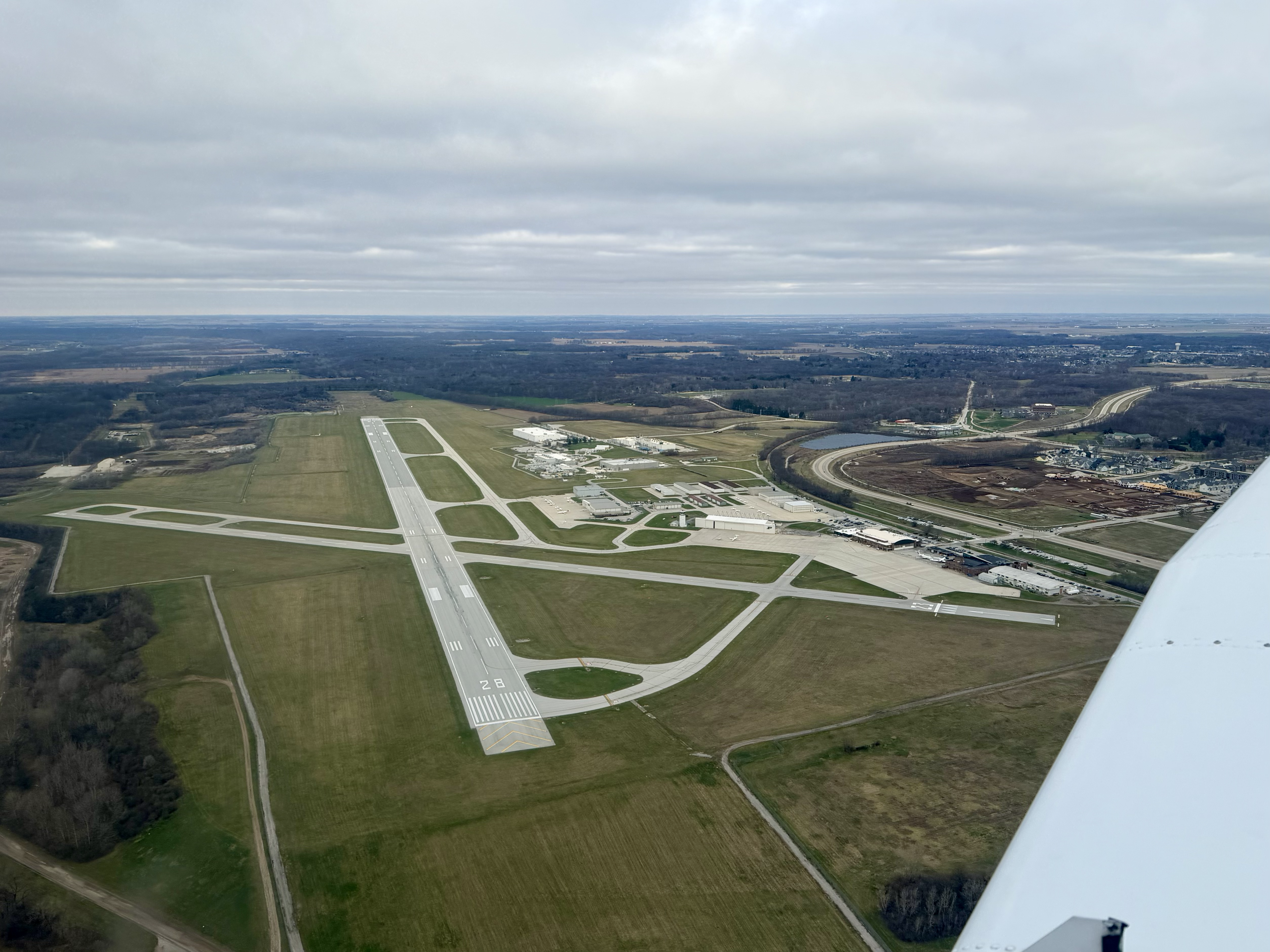
- Aerial view, March 2026
- IATA: LAF; ICAO: KLAF; FAA LID: LAF

Summary
- Airport type: Public
- Owner: Purdue University
- Serves: Lafayette, Indiana
- Location: West Lafayette, Indiana
- Elevation AMSL: 606 ft (185 m)
- Coordinates: 40°24′44″N 86°56′13″W
- Website: www.purdue.edu/airport/

Maps
- FAA Airport Diagram

- Location of airport in Tippecanoe County LAF (Indiana) LAF (the United States)

Runways
Direction	Length		Surface
Direction	ft	m	Surface
10/28	6,600	2,012	Asphalt
5/23	4,225	1,288	Asphalt

Statistics
- Aircraft operations (2019): 117,727
- Based aircraft (Dec. 2020): 84
- Source: Federal Aviation Administration

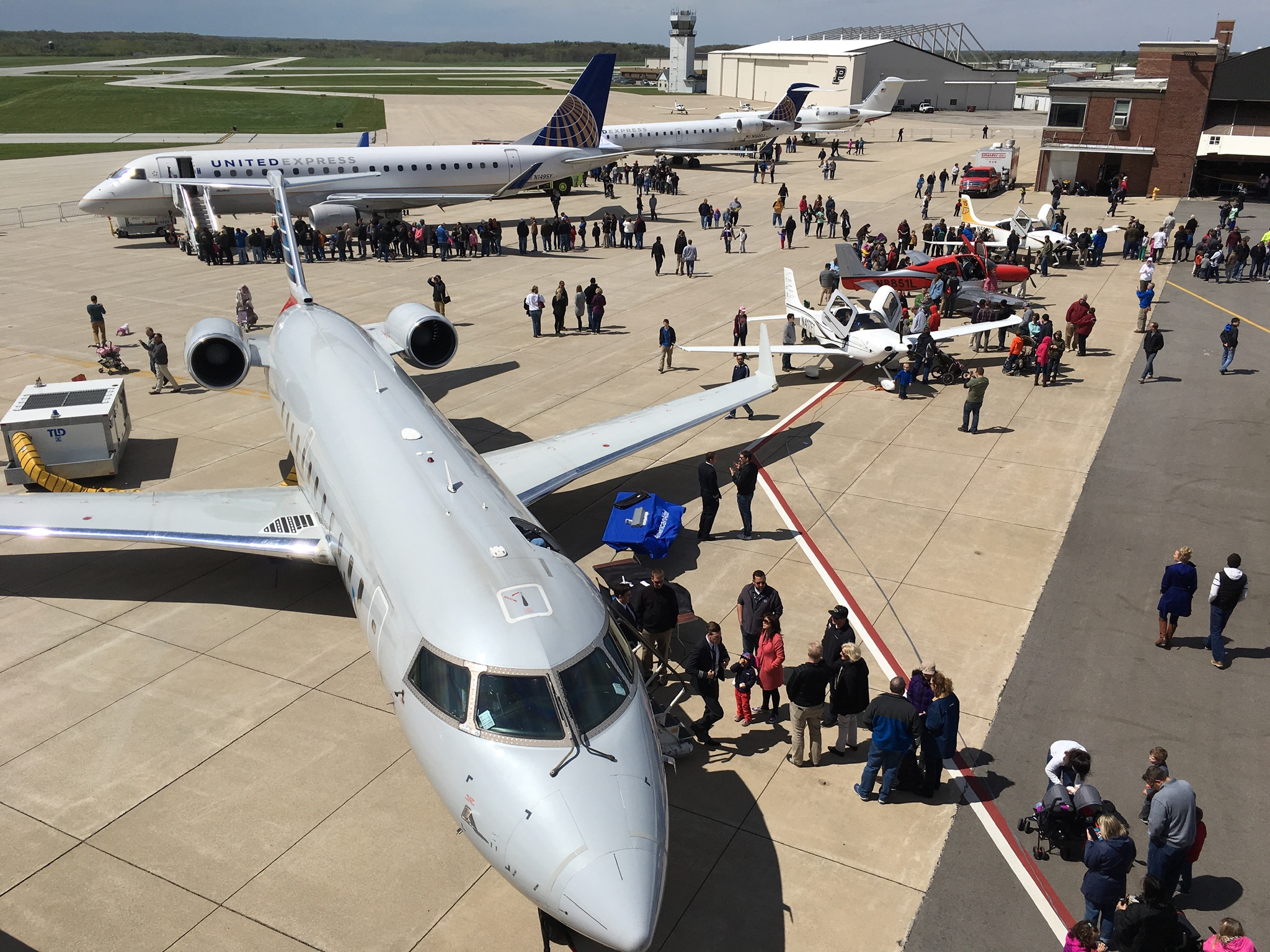
Overview of Purdue Aviation Day 2017, an annual aviation show held each spring at Purdue University Airport.

Purdue University Airport (IATA: LAF, ICAO: KLAF, FAA LID: LAF) is a public-use airport in Tippecanoe County, Indiana, United States. It is owned by Purdue University, and is 2 nautical miles (3.7 km; 2.3 mi) southwest of the central business district of Lafayette, Indiana, in West Lafayette.

Because of the heavy traffic generated by Purdue University and its flight programs, Purdue University Airport is one of the busiest airports in Indiana, second only to the Indianapolis International Airport. According to Federal Aviation Administration (FAA) records, the airport had 3,161 passenger boardings in calendar year 2022.

The airport is served by United Express, with daily passenger flights to O'Hare International Airport in Chicago.

It is included in the FAA National Plan of Integrated Airport Systems for 2021–25, in which its FAA airport category is a regional general aviation facility.

== History ==
Purdue University Airport was the very first university-owned airport in the United States. In 1930, inventor-industrialist David E. Ross (one of two people for whom Purdue's Ross–Ade Stadium is named) donated a tract of land to be used as an aeronautical education and research facility at Purdue University.

The U.S. government designated Purdue University Airport as an emergency landing strip on November 1, 1930.

Runway 5/23 was paved later in the 1930s.

Amelia Earhart prepared her airplane for her around-the-world flight attempt in Hangar 1 at the airport. Earhart was an adjunct faculty member at the time, and the Lockheed Model 10 Electra she flew was purchased for her by the Purdue Research Foundation.

Hundreds of members of the U.S. Army, Navy, and War Training Service were trained at Purdue Airport during World War II, as were several commercial pilots from Latin America. In 1955, the airport became the home of the first Reserve Officers' Training Corps flight training program.

The original hangar, now known as the Niswonger Hall of Aviation Technology, still stands and is used by Purdue University's Department of Aviation Technology as offices, classrooms, and laboratories. The bay that held Earhart's plane still contains aircraft that are used by the Aeronautical Engineering Technology program for maintenance and inspection training. A large addition to the building was completed in the summer of 2009. A plaque on the building near the side entrance commemorates the airport's history.

In the early 60s, runway 10/28 and a larger hangar were built to support the Midwest Program on Airborne Television Instruction with two DC-6 aircraft.

From 1942 through 1971 Purdue University also had its own airline based at the airport, first known as Purdue Aeronautics Corporation and later Purdue Airlines. Originally operating Douglas DC-3 aircraft and then Douglas DC-6s, it finally operated three McDonnell Douglas DC-9-30 jet aircraft. The airline also operated a further DC-9 on behalf of Playboy founder Hugh Hefner as his private jet, "The Big Bunny", also based at the airport.

Evergreen International Airlines maintained a short-lived cargo operation at the Airport in the late 1970s using Lockheed L-188 Electra turboprop aircraft.

President Ronald Reagan and Air Force One (then a military version of a Boeing 707) visited Purdue University Airport on April 9, 1987. He later wrote a letter concerning a list of questions to the editor of the Purdue Exponent concerning his optimism about the future of relations between the United States and the Soviet Union and his favorable impression of what he saw at Purdue.

Following the loss of regularly scheduled airline service in 2004, airport administration shifted focus to the needs of the university's aviation technology programs. Airline service at the airport resumed in May 2024.

== Airlines and destinations ==
Airlines	Destinations
United Express	Chicago–O'Hare

== Airline service history ==
From the 1950s until the mid-2000s, Purdue University Airport received regularly scheduled commercial air service. The airport saw as many as 45,000 enplanements in 1979. LAF was eligible for Essential Air Service funding until June 1999, when the Department of Transportation removed the airport's status due to its proximity to Indianapolis International Airport.

Lake Central Airlines first began service to Lafayette about 1950 flying Douglas DC-3's on a Chicago-Gary IN-Lafayette-Indianapolis route. The stop at Gary was discontinued by 1962. Lake Central merged into Allegheny Airlines in 1968.

Allegheny Airlines, (which later became USAir and is now American Airlines), operated flights to Chicago O'Hare and Indianapolis until 1975 using Convair 580 turboprops as well as British Aircraft Corporation BAC One-Eleven series 200s jets.

Indiana Airways, a local commuter airline, operated from November 1977 until March 1980. The small airline operated Cessna 402s as well as Piper Navajo Chieftains to fly directly to Indianapolis, as well as to Fort Wayne and Cincinnati through Indianapolis.

Air Wisconsin offered direct flights to Chicago O'Hare and Fort Wayne from February 1971 through Summer 1985.

Britt Airways operated flights on a Chicago O'Hare - Lafayette - Terre Haute, IN routing between 1984 and 1989. Britt was bought out by People Express in 1985 which was then merged into Continental Airlines in 1987. Britt then began operating as Continental Express. Britt flew Fairchild Swearingen Metroliner and Fairchild Hiller FH-227 aircraft. Britt also flew as Piedmont Commuter on behalf of Piedmont Airlines to Dayton, Ohio from late 1985 through late 1986.

Piedmont Commuter, operated by Jetstream International Airlines on behalf of Piedmont Airlines, flew to Dayton, Ohio beginning in late 1987. Piedmont merged into USAir in 1989 at which time Piedmont Commuter then became USAir Express. Service to LAF ended in early 1992.

Delta Connection, operated by Comair, briefly flew six daily round-trip flights between the airport and Cincinnati with Embraer EMB-110 Bandeirante commuter turboprops in 1987.

Midway Connection (formerly Fischer Brothers Aviation) operated flights to Chicago Midway International Airport on behalf of Midway Airlines, from 1988 to 1989.

American Eagle, operated by Simmons Airlines on behalf of American Airlines, offered flights to Chicago O'Hare and Terre Haute, IN from 1989 until 1995.

United Express, operated by Great Lakes Airlines on behalf of United Airlines, provided daily flights to Chicago O'Hare and Mattoon, IL on Beechcraft 1900D aircraft from 1995 until February 2001.

Northwest Airlink, operated by Mesaba Airlines on behalf of Northwest Airlines, offered service to Detroit on Saab 340s from 1992 until December 18, 2002. Some flights would stop at Fort Wayne, IN or Benton Harbor MI.

Lastly, AmericanConnection, operated by Corporate Airlines on behalf of American Airlines, offered daily service to St. Louis with British Aerospace BAe Jetstream commuter propjets. This was the airport's last regular scheduled airline service and operated from December 2002 until February 15, 2004.

In 2009, the airport unsuccessfully applied for a federal grant to subsidize two daily round-trip flights to and from Chicago O'Hare. In 2021, it again applied for a Small Community Air Service Development grant in an attempt to subsidize flights on Allegiant Air to Florida.

In late 2022, the airport received a state grant to fund projects associated with restoring commercial air service. In December 2023, Purdue announced a formal partnership with Southern Airways Express, which began passenger service to Chicago O'Hare on May 15, 2024. Southern Airways was replaced by SkyWest, operating as United Express, in August 2025.

== Facilities and aircraft ==
Purdue University Airport has an FAA-staffed air traffic control tower and is the second busiest tower in Indiana.

The airport covers an area of 527 acres (213 ha) at an elevation of 606 feet (185 m) above mean sea level. It has two asphalt paved runways: 10/28 is 6,600 by 150 feet (2,012 x 46 m) and 5/23 is 4,225 by 100 feet (1,288 x 30 m).

Runway 10 has a Category 1 ILS approach. Runways 10 and 28 are both served by GPS WAAS approaches. Additionally, a VOR-A approach is available.

Runway 10 is occasionally used in a shortened configuration: aircraft land at the beginning of the runway but do not use its full length to stop. Instead, they hold short of the intersecting runway 5/23. Known as a land and hold short operation (LAHSO), this procedure is relatively common in the United States and allows both runways to be used at the same time. Pilots have the ability to reject the LAHSO clearance if they need the full runway to ensure a safe landing.

Runway 23 has a displaced threshold, which shortens the runway to 3,913 ft for landing operations.

For the 12-month period ending December 31, 2019, the airport had 117,727 aircraft operations, an average of 322 per day: 99% general aviation, 1% air taxi, and <1% military/commercial. In December 2020, there were 84 aircraft based at this airport: 73 single-engine, 7 multi-engine, 2 jet, and 2 helicopter.

FedEx donated a 727 to Purdue, which was eventually torn apart. United Airlines donated a 737, which was subsequently torn apart and given to the Department of Aviation Technology's aircraft mechanics program. In October 2014, Comair donated a Bombardier CRJ-100, which was then customized with Purdue logos near the cabin door and on the tail.

The airport is also home to Ascension St. Vincent StatFlight, a medical helicopter service operated by PHI Air Medical utilizing Bell 407's.

The airport's original passenger terminal was used for air service until early 2004 and had space for two airline gates. The building was built in 1943 as hangar-2, was renovated in 1979 to provide screening for airline passengers and again in 1984, including a new entrance, concourse, and baggage claim area. It currently houses an aviation library and airport administration offices. Its functionality as an airline terminal was still regularly used for charters for Purdue Sports until the opening of the current terminal. A new terminal on the west side of the airfield was planned in the 1980s. These plans were later altered to include a new terminal on the east side of the airfield in the early 2000s. In August 2023, as part of a plan to restore airline service, Purdue's board of trustees approved the planning and construction of a new terminal that would meet TSA and FAA requirements.

The plans for a new terminal finally came to fruition in August 2025 when the Amelia Earhart terminal opened to the public. The terminal has its own TSA checkpoint, baggage check, and lounge area. Flights for the public operate between Purdue Airport and O'Hare Airport.

== See also ==
- List of airports in Indiana
