= West Coast Airlines =

US carrier (1941–1968) that merged into Air West

IATA	ICAO	Call sign
WC	WC	WEST COAST
- Founded: 1941
- Ceased operations: 1968 (merged with Pacific Air Lines and Bonanza Air Lines to form Air West)
- Hubs: Seattle–Boeing
- Focus cities: Boise; Portland (OR); Spokane
- Headquarters: Westlake, Seattle, Washington, U.S.

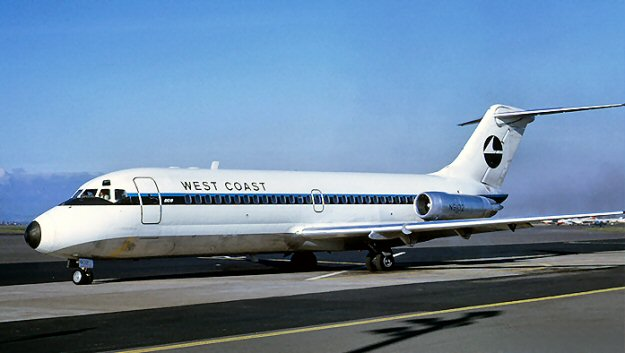
Douglas DC-9

West Coast Airlines was a United States local service carrier, a scheduled airline certificated by the federal Civil Aeronautics Board (CAB), linking small cities in the Pacific Northwest with larger cities in Washington, Oregon, Idaho, Utah, Montana, California and north to Alberta in Canada. It was headquartered in the Westlake area of Seattle, Washington.

== History ==
West Coast was formed in 1941 and acquired fellow local service carrier Empire Air Lines in 1952. The company was based at Boeing Field in Seattle and began scheduled passenger service in 1946 with a fleet of Douglas DC-3s, marketed as Scenicliners.

A promotional film produced for the company in the 1960s said that in 1946 the federal Civil Aeronautics Board (CAB) granted the first regional airline certificate to West Coast Airlines as local service air carrier.

In July 1953, West Coast scheduled flights to 32 airports in Washington, Oregon, and Idaho; in May 1968 it flew to 36 airports including 29 in those states. Like other Local Service airlines West Coast was subsidized; in 1962 its revenues included $6.6 million from passengers and $5.4 million for mail.

West Coast was the first local service airline in the U.S. to use turbine airliners when it began Fairchild F-27 flights in September 1958. The F-27 was the U.S. manufactured version of the Dutch built Fokker F27 Friendship. In June 1968 West Coast was the first airline to order Fairchild 228 twin jets with the acquisition of three planned, but the F-228, a smaller variant of the Dutch manufactured Fokker F28 Fellowship, never made it to production. The only jet operated by West Coast was the Douglas DC-9-14 with 75 seats, all coach.

On July 1, 1968, West Coast merged with Pacific Air Lines and Bonanza Air Lines to form Air West, which became Hughes Airwest in 1970. In 1968, West Coast operated Douglas DC-9s, Fairchild F-27s, Douglas DC-3s, and Piper Navajos. The DC-3s were not transferred to Air West and were retired; the Navajos continued for a short time. The West Coast route system then included cities in Idaho, Oregon, Washington, and several in Montana. San Francisco, Oakland, and Sacramento in northern California were added in 1959 with Salt Lake City being served later. West Coast's only international destination was Calgary, Alberta, which was served with F-27s from Spokane. Almost all West Coast flights at Seattle used Boeing Field (BFI) instead of Seattle–Tacoma International Airport (SEA); after the merger Air West and successor Hughes Airwest continued to use BFI until DC-9 and F-27 flights moved to SEA in 1971.

== Jet service destinations in 1968 ==
The April 28, 1968 West Coast timetable listed the following cities being served with Douglas DC-9-10 jets:

- Boise, ID (BOI)
- Eugene, OR (EUG)
- Medford, OR (MFR)
- Pasco, WA (PSC)
- Portland, OR (PDX)
- Salt Lake City, UT (SLC)
- San Francisco, CA (SFO)
- Seattle, WA - Boeing Field (BFI)
- Spokane, WA (GEG)
- Walla Walla, WA (ALW)
- Yakima, WA (YKM)

Other destinations saw Fairchild F-27s, Douglas DC-3s and/or Piper Navajos (or, in 1966, Piper Aztecs).

West Coast's lineage runs through a string of mergers: In 1980 Hughes Airwest was acquired by Republic Airlines which had been created by a merger of Southern Airways and North Central Airlines in 1979. In 1986 Republic Airlines was acquired by Northwest Airlines (formerly Northwest Orient Airlines). The Delta-Northwest merger with Delta Air Lines as the surviving air carrier was completed in 2010.

In 2001 an attempt was made to resurrect the West Coast Airlines name, with plans for an airline based in Concord, California, to connect several Northern California cities with Las Vegas, Reno and San Diego. The effort ended in bankruptcy.

A Canadian commuter airline with a similar name, West Coast Air, flew floatplanes between Vancouver and Victoria, British Columbia.

== Accidents ==
- On January 17, 1963, a Fairchild F-27 (N2703) operating West Coast Airlines Flight 703 on a training flight, crashed into the Great Salt Lake, killing all 3 aboard.
- On August 24, 1963, a Fairchild F-27 (N2707) operating West Coast Airlines Flight 794, flying from Spokane, Washington to Calgary, Canada crashed short of the runway at Calgary. An investigation concluded that the pilot failed to maintain the approved minimum altitude during the approach. There were no fatalities among the 16 occupants.
- West Coast Airlines Flight 956 crashed on October 1, 1966, with eighteen fatalities and no survivors 5.5 miles (9 km) south of Wemme, Oregon. This accident marked the first loss of a Douglas DC-9, and the first fatalities for the airline.
- West Coast Airlines Flight 720 crashed on March 10, 1967, with four fatalities and no survivors near Klamath Falls, Oregon. The Fairchild F-27 was bound for Medford from Klamath Falls, and crashed due to ice accumulation on the aircraft.

== Fleet ==
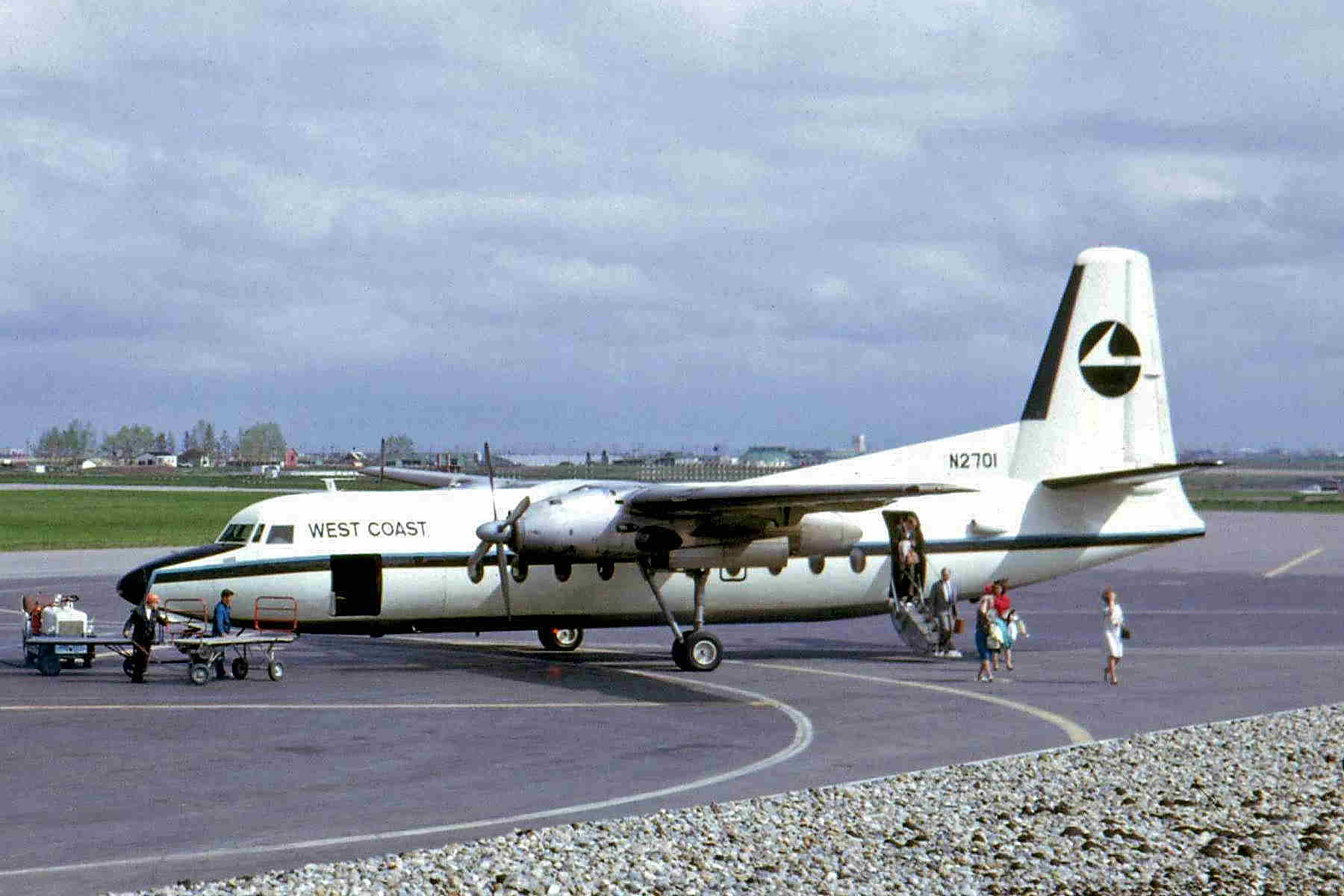
West Coast Fairchild F-27

The West Coast Airlines fleet consisted of the following aircraft:

- 13 - Douglas DC-3
- 4 - Douglas DC-9-14
- 14 - Fairchild F-27
- Piper Aztec
- Piper Navajo (PA-31 model)

== Destinations in 1968 ==
The April 28, 1968 West Coast timetable lists scheduled passenger flights to:

- Astoria, Oregon
- Baker, Oregon
- Boise, Idaho - Focus city
- Burley, Idaho - Rupert, Idaho was served via Burley.
- Calgary, Alberta, Canada - only international destination
- Corvallis, Oregon - Albany, Oregon was served via Corvallis
- Ephrata, Washington - Moses Lake, Washington was served via Ephrata
- Eugene, Oregon
- Great Falls, Montana
- Hoquiam, Washington - Aberdeen, Washington was served via Hoquiam
- Idaho Falls, Idaho
- Kalispell, Montana
- Klamath Falls, Oregon
- Lewiston, Idaho - Clarkston, Washington was served via Lewiston
- McMinnville, Oregon
- Medford, Oregon
- North Bend, Oregon - Coos Bay, Oregon was served via North Bend
- Oakland, California
- Olympia, Washington
- Ontario, Oregon- Payette, Idaho was served via Ontario
- Pasco, Washington
- Pocatello, Idaho
- Portland, Oregon- Focus city
- Pullman, Washington - Moscow, Idaho was served via Pullman
- Redmond, Oregon - Bend, Oregon was served via Redmond
- Roseburg, Oregon
- Sacramento, California
- Salt Lake City, Utah
- San Francisco, California
- Seattle, Washington - Hub and headquarters at Boeing Field (BFI)
- Spokane, Washington - Focus city
- Sun Valley, Idaho
- Tacoma, Washington
- Twin Falls, Idaho
- Walla Walla, Washington
- Wenatchee, Washington
- Yakima, Washington

== See also ==
- List of defunct airlines of the United States
