= Mid-West Airlines =

Brief-lived US local service carrier (1949–1952)

- Founded: 1933 (as Iowa Airplane Company)
- Commenced operations: 21 October 1949
- Ceased operations: 15 May 1952
- Operating bases: Des Moines, Iowa
- Parent company: Purdue Research Foundation(1951–1952)
- Headquarters: Des Moines, Iowa, United States
- Key people: F.C. Anderson

Mid-West's network and proposed additions from the April 1952 CAB case that denied its certificate extension

Mid-West Airlines was a Des Moines, Iowa-based local service carrier, a scheduled airline certificated by the Civil Aeronautics Board (CAB), the now-defunct Federal agency that at the time tightly regulated almost all US air transportation, to fly smaller routes in Iowa, Minnesota, Nebraska, and South Dakota. It was briefly owned by a Purdue University affiliate before being liquidated after the CAB refused to extend the airline's initial certification. It was one of three local service carriers (out of 19 that started CAB-certificated operations) that failed to have initial certification extended by the CAB, the other two being Florida Airways and Wiggins Airways.

== History ==
=== Startup ===
Iowa Airplane Company was a Des Moines-based fixed base operator established in 1933. During World War II it ran a significant pilot training program for the US military using up to 60 aircraft. In December 1946, the company was provisionally certificated by the CAB to provide air transportation on smaller routes from Des Moines to surrounding states, at which time the airline projected it would use aircraft such as the small twin-engine Beech 18 airliner. Issuance of the certificate was subject to the airline demonstrating it had sufficient airport facilities. In the event, first flight did not occur until October 21, 1949, with Cessna 190 single-engine aircraft, by which point the airline had changed its name to Mid-West Airlines. The airline's president was F.C. Anderson.

Mid-West was one of three local service carriers that started service with single-engine aircraft, the others being Central Airlines, Turner Airlines and Wiggins.

See External links for a link to a photo of a Mid-West aircraft of this era.

=== Purdue University purchase ===
In November 1951, the CAB approved the purchase of Mid-West by Purdue Research Foundation (PRF), an affiliate of Purdue University. Purdue University had an ongoing interest in airlines. It operated aviation education and research programs through non-profit Purdue Aeronautics Corporation (PAC), which operated a fleet of aircraft for educational purposes. PAC briefly operated CAB-certificated scheduled service in 1949–1950, and from 1953 onward held CAB charter flight certification, ultimately acquiring airliner-class aircraft such as Douglas DC-3s and DC-6s. Mid-West was then one of the smallest local service carriers and PRF planned to invest $1 million into the airline (over $11mm in 2024 dollars) to upgrade the fleet to DC-3s, the aircraft then becoming prevalent among most local service carriers. Following CAB approval, PRF entered into an agreement to buy 10 DC-3s from Eastern Air Lines to refleet Mid-West.

=== CAB rejection, liquidation ===
However, in April 1952, less than six months after permitting PRF to buy Mid-West, the CAB voted to decline to renew the certificate of the airline, forcing it to liquidate. The CAB cited two main reasons, economics the bigger of the two: the Federal government subsidized local service carriers and CAB projections showed Mid-West DC-3 service would be far more expensive to subsidize than any other local service carrier. A second reason was that upgraded Mid-West service would provide direct competition to United Airlines on some routes, which was held to be undesirable. The five member Board split 3–2 on the decision and the two members in the minority wrote lengthy dissenting opinions, detailing how, in their view, the PRF plan made sense and that there was ample reason to expect Mid-West's fortunes to recover. However, Mid-West's existing results were even worse than those of Florida Airways, whose certificate the CAB declined to renew in 1949.

PRF's DC-3 purchase contract was contingent on receiving renewal of the Mid-West certificate. The Foundation said that by liquidating the carrier it would be able to easily recoup the money it had spent to acquire it. Mid-West flew its last flight May 15, 1952.

== Destinations ==
A 5 January 1951 Mid-West timetable shows 13 points in Nebraska, nine in Iowa, four in South Dakota and six in Minnesota.

See also the picture above, showing Mid-West's network at the time the CAB denied its certificate extension.
