= Empire Air Lines =

US airline (1944–1952) that merged into West Coast

- Founded: 1944; 81 years ago
- Ceased operations: 1952; 73 years ago
- Hubs: Lewiston
- Focus cities: Boise; Spokane
- Fleet size: See Fleet
- Headquarters: Lewiston, Idaho, U.S.
- Founder: Bert Zimmerly (President)

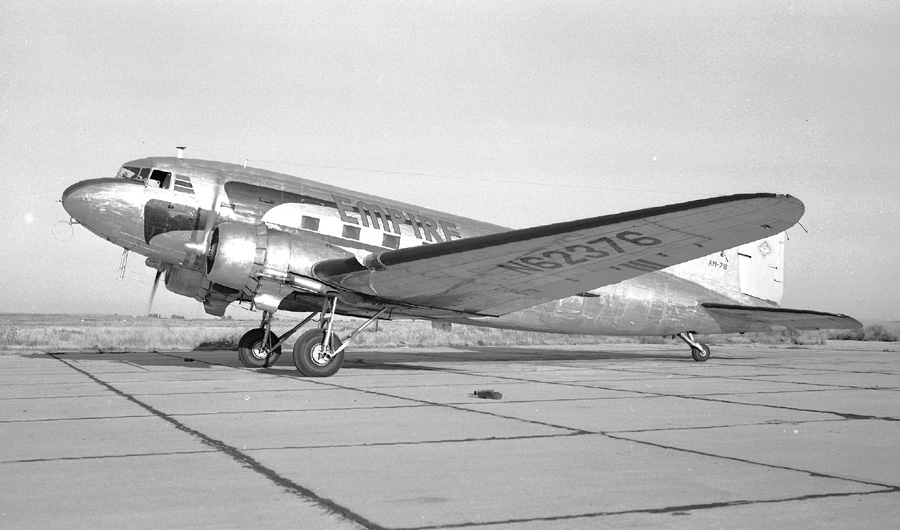
A Douglas DC-3 operated by Empire Air Lines at Boise, Idaho in 1952.

Empire Air Lines was a United States local service carrier that was founded in July 1944 by Bert Zimmerly at Lewiston, Idaho. The founder had formerly been operating Zimmerly Airlines, a commercial charter service that had been operating since 1943. Empire was inactive until early in 1946, when it purchased the assets of Zimmerly Airlines, including ten Boeing 247 aircraft. Starting as an intrastate airline in Idaho, it operated daily round trip service between Coeur d'Alene, Idaho and Pocatello, Idaho with four intermediate stops. The Civil Aeronautics Board (CAB) granted temporary permission to the airline to offer interstate feeder lines between Spokane, Washington and locations in Idaho and eastern Oregon.

In 1952, the CAB approved the sale of Empire Air Lines to West Coast Airlines for about $500,000 (equivalent to $2,700,000 in 2024).

== Fleet ==
At the time of its merger with West Coast, Empire had a fleet of five DC-3s.

== See also ==
- List of defunct airlines of the United States
