= Pioneer Air Lines =

US airline that merged into Continental in 1955

Essair/Pioneer Air Lines
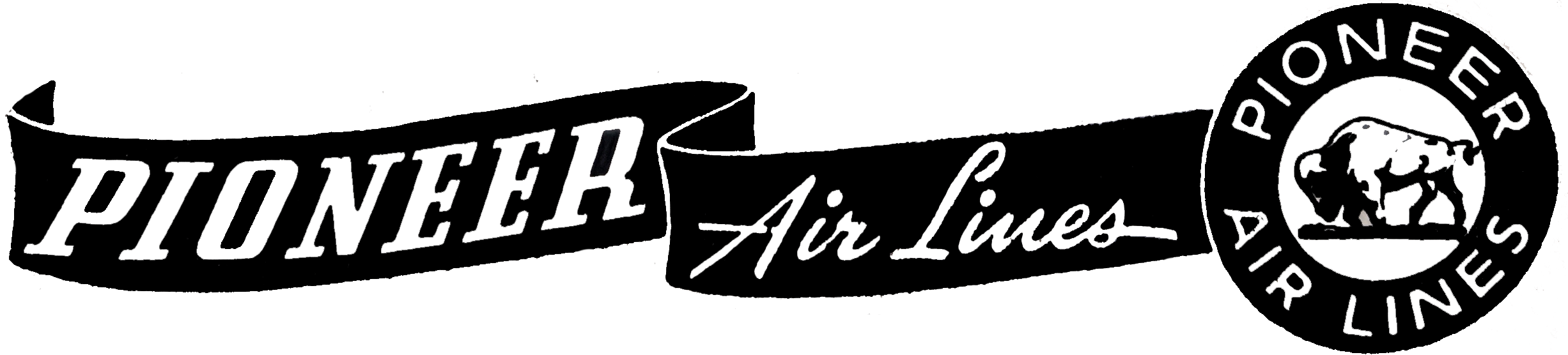
- Founded: 1939
- Commenced operations: 1 August 1945 (as a certificated carrier); 1946 (changed name to Pioneer Air Lines)
- Ceased operations: 1 April 1955 (merged into Continental Airlines)
- Fleet size: 20
- Destinations: See below
- Headquarters: Houston, Texas, United States

1955 Pioneer and Continental networks per the Civil Aeronautics Board case that approved the merger

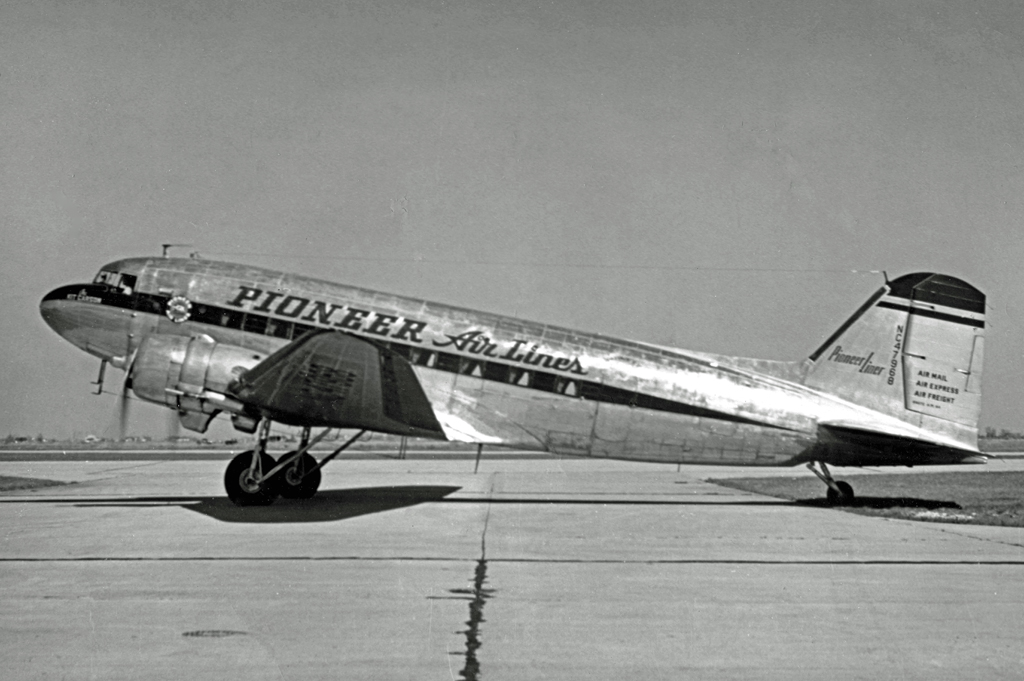
Pioneer Air Lines Douglas DC-3 in 1948

Essair (short for Efficiency, Safety, and Speed in the Air) was incorporated in 1939, the first airline authorized by the federal Civil Aeronautics Board (CAB) to fly as a local service carrier in the United States. Essair Lines changed its name to Pioneer Air Lines in 1946, and served destinations in New Mexico and Texas. Pioneer was acquired by and merged into Continental Airlines in 1955.

An unrelated commuter airline using the name Pioneer Airlines operated in Colorado, Idaho, Montana, Nebraska, New Mexico, North Dakota, South Dakota and Wyoming during the late 1970s through 1980s with Beechcraft 99 and Fairchild Swearingen Metroliner turboprop aircraft. Besides operating as an independent air carrier, this second version of Pioneer also provided feeder connecting flight services on behalf of Continental Airlines as a Continental Commuter air carrier at the Denver airport (DEN) via a code sharing agreement with Continental from 1983 through 1986.

== Background ==
Founded by Major William F. Long (who owned the Dallas Aviation School and Air College), Essair began a temporary service between Houston and Amarillo, via Austin, San Angelo, Abilene, and Lubbock. On July 11, 1944, the Civil Aeronautics Board agreed that an experiment in subsidized short-haul and local scheduled air service should be conducted. The experiment involved the establishment of a new airline category, known as "feeder" or "local service" air carriers. On August 1, 1945, Essair became the first airline to fly under the new classification, with a temporary certificate. and operated Lockheed Model 10 Electra twin prop aircraft on its routes within Texas.

== Pioneer Air Lines ==
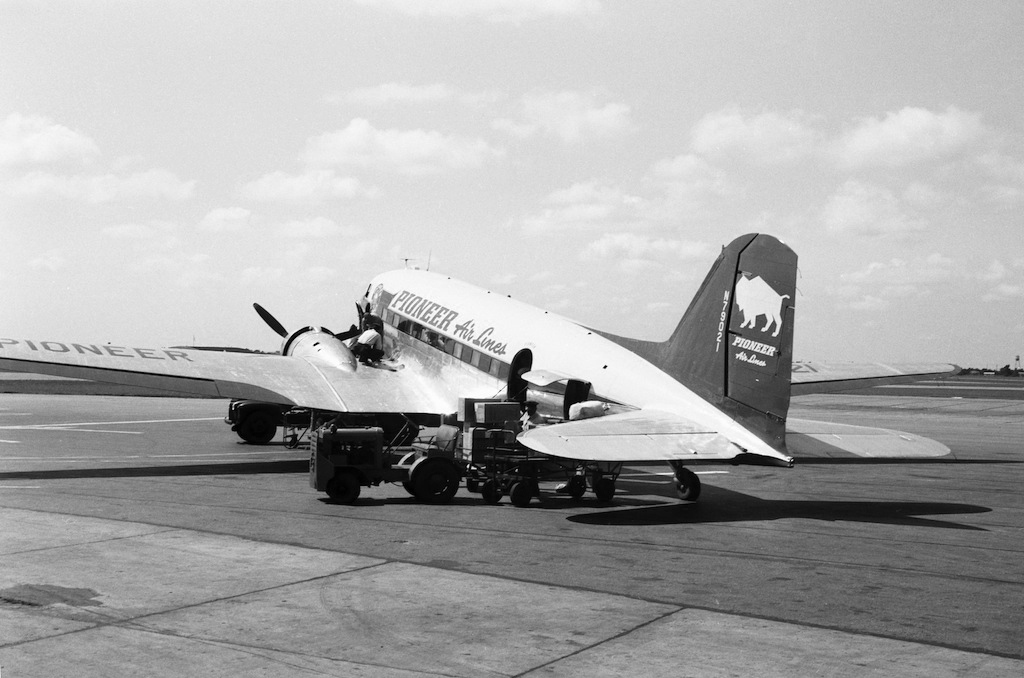
DC-3 Tulsa 1950

The airline's name became Pioneer Air Lines in 1946. The Electras were replaced by Douglas DC-3s with 23 of the type being used between 1946 and 1953. New routes to several cities in New Mexico were added in 1948. From June 1952, nine Martin 2-0-2 unpressurised airliners were operated by Pioneer after they were purchased from Northwest Airlines. Davies (and Killion) says the federal CAB forced Pioneer to revert to the DC-3s in 1953 however, per the February 1955 Official Airline Guide (OAG), the carrier reintroduced the 36-seat Martin 202's back on some flights. The 202's were known as "Pioneer Pacemaster" aircraft.

In April 1949 Pioneer scheduled flights to 24 airports in New Mexico and Texas from Albuquerque and El Paso in the west to Dallas and Houston in the east. In February 1955 it flew to 21 airports; later that year it was acquired by and merged into Continental Airlines.

== Destinations in 1953 ==
The November 1, 1953 Pioneer Air Lines system timetable listed the following 22 destinations:

- Abilene, TX
- Albuquerque, NM
- Amarillo, TX
- Austin, TX
- Big Spring, TX
- Breckenridge, TX
- Bryan/College Station, TX
- Clovis, NM
- Dallas, TX - Dallas Love Field
- Fort Worth, TX - Amon Carter Field
- Houston, TX - Houston Hobby Airport - headquarters for the airline
- Lubbock, TX
- Midland/Odessa, TX
- Mineral Wells, TX
- Plainview, TX
- San Angelo, TX
- Santa Fe, NM
- Snyder, TX
- Sweetwater, TX
- Temple, TX
- Tucumcari, NM
- Waco, TX

Pioneer also previously served El Paso, TX, Las Cruces, NM, Las Vegas, NM, and Roswell, NM, from 1948 to 1951.

Following its acquisition of Pioneer, the April 1, 1955, Continental Airlines timetable contained this message: "Now...ONE GREAT AIRLINE to serve you better! Pioneer Air Lines, serving 22 cities over 2000 route miles in Texas and New Mexico, officially becomes part of the greater Continental Air Lines system and opens a new era in air transportation for the Southwest!" However, by late 1963 Continental had ceased serving a number of the destinations previously served by Pioneer as the routes were transferred to Trans-Texas Airways.

== Fleet ==
Aviation Week magazine for March 14, 1955 lists Pioneer as having a fleet of 20 aircraft, comprising:

- 11 Douglas DC-3
- 9 Martin 2-0-2

Pioneer or Essair was also known to operate:

- Lockheed Model 10 Electra (initially operated by Essair)
- Consolidated Fleetster 20A

== See also ==
- Harding Lawrence
- List of defunct airlines of the United States

== Bibliography ==
- Gradidge, Jennifer (2006). DC-3 The First Seventy Years. Air-Britain (historians) Ltd. ISBN 0-85130-332-3.
- Marson, Peter J. (2001). The Lockheed Twins. Air-Britain (Historians. ISBN 0-85130-284-X.
