= Pacific Air Lines =

U.S. regional airline (1941–1968)

Southwest Airways (1941–1958) Pacific Air Lines (1958–1968)
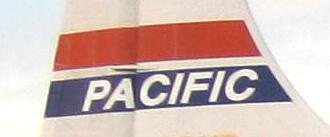
IATA	ICAO	Call sign
PC	PCA	PACIFIC
- Founded: 1941 (renamed Southwest Airways)
- Commenced operations: December 2, 1946 (renamed Southwest Airways); March 6, 1958 (renamed Pacific Air Lines)
- Ceased operations: 1968 (merged with Bonanza Air Lines and West Coast Airlines to form Air West)
- Hubs: San Francisco International Airport
- Fleet size: 40
- Headquarters: San Francisco International Airport
- Key people: John Howard Connelly; Leland Hayward

Pacific Air Lines was a local service carrier on the West Coast of the United States that began scheduled passenger flights in the mid-1940s under the name Southwest Airways. The company linked small cities in California with larger cities such as Los Angeles and San Francisco. Flights later operated to Portland, Oregon, and eventually reached Las Vegas and Reno in Nevada.

Founded largely with money from investors from the Hollywood motion picture industry, the airline was noted for innovative safety practices and cost-saving procedures. The name Pacific Air Lines passed into history in 1968 in a merger with Bonanza Air Lines and West Coast Airlines, forming Air West, which then became Hughes Airwest following the acquisition of Air West by Howard Hughes.

== Southwest Airways era (1941–1958) ==
Southwest Airways 1940s logo

=== Founding and wartime operations ===
In early 1941 Air Service veteran John Howard "Jack" Connelly and noted Hollywood agent/producer Leland Hayward formed a business partnership that five years later evolved into a scheduled airline. Neither was a stranger to aviation; Connelly was a former test pilot, airplane salesman, Civil Aeronautics Administration instructor pilot, and inspector for the 1930s-era Soviet Union. Hayward was an active private pilot and was on the board of directors of Transcontinental and Western Airlines (TWA). The two men enlisted the support of commercial pilot and photographer John Swope to oversee the training of aviation cadets. Together, they founded a maintenance depot for overhauling training aircraft, a wartime air cargo line, and a military pilot training complex consisting of Thunderbird Field No. 1, Thunderbird Field No. 2, and Falcon Field in Arizona. By the end of World War II, Southwest Airways was the largest training contractor in the United States, and had trained more than 20,000 pilots from over 24 countries.

=== Start of scheduled service ===
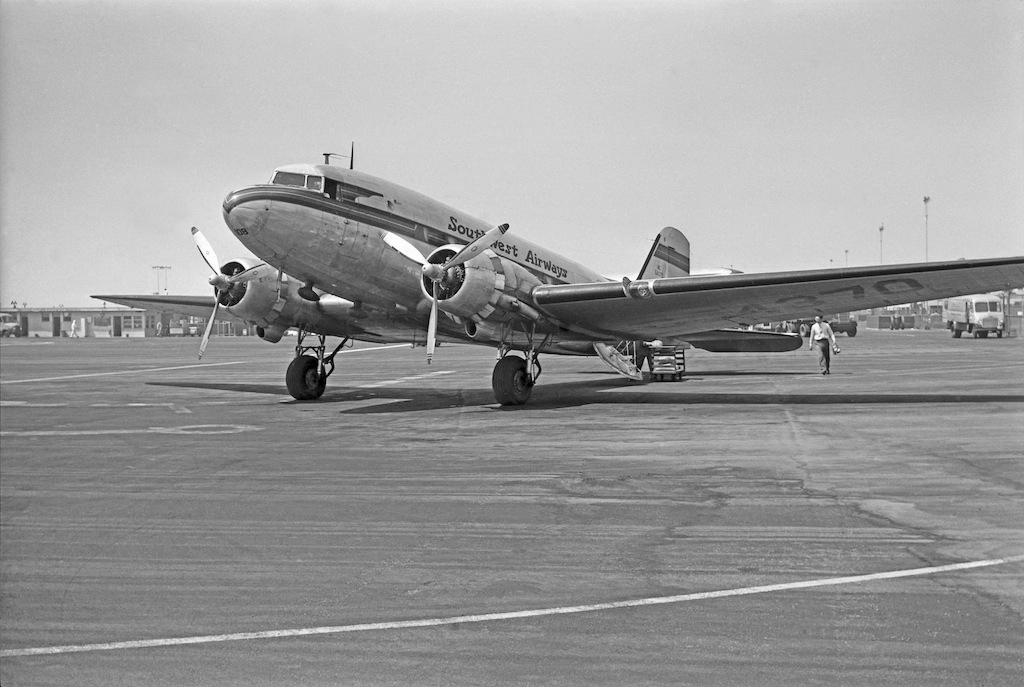
A Douglas DC-3 of Southwest Airways at Los Angeles International Airport (1949)

After the war, Connelly and Hayward raised $2,000,000 from investors including James Stewart and Darryl Zanuck to expand Southwest into the airline business, pending government approval. They were awarded a three-year experimental charter from the Civil Aeronautics Board on May 22, 1946, for their feeder service.

Scheduled flights began on December 2, 1946, with war-surplus C-47s, the military version of Douglas DC-3 converted for civil use. The initial route was Los Angeles to San Francisco with stops in Oxnard, Santa Barbara, Santa Maria, San Luis Obispo, Paso Robles, Coalinga, Monterey, Santa Cruz/Watsonville, and San Jose. The north coastal route included Oakland, Vallejo/Napa, Santa Rosa, Ukiah, Fort Bragg, Eureka/Arcata, and Crescent City, while the inland route included Oakland, Sacramento, Marysville/Yuba City, Oroville, Chico, Red Bluff, Redding, and Yreka with Medford, Oregon, added later. By the late 1950s Pacific Air Lines was serving Catalina Airport on Santa Catalina Island off the coast of southern California with flights from Los Angeles (LAX), Long Beach (LGB) and Burbank (BUR, now Bob Hope Airport. In 1960, a Crescent City to Portland, Oregon flight was added.

In August 1953, Southwest scheduled flights to 23 airports, all in California except for Medford; in May 1968, Pacific flew to 29 airports.

=== No-frills spirit and quick turnarounds ===
Connelly serves no food ("let them bring their own"), provides no chewing gum ("we never fly high enough to need it and besides it sticks to the floor") or magazines ("takes too long to unwrap them")

— TIME, October 18, 1948

Connelly, president, and Hayward, board chairman, were the majority owners of the airline, and as such could hold sway concerning how the company would operate. Running on slim operating margins, Southwest Airways was a no-frills airline decades before low-cost carriers became common.

The airline speeded ground operations to the point where a DC-3 could load and discharge passengers and begin taxiing for takeoff 90 seconds after coming to a stop (adding six minutes if fuel is needed). To save money, the airline had its own pilots do the refueling instead of paying airport personnel. Ground time was reduced by keeping one engine running while a male purser quickly escorted passengers to and from the plane. Pacific's DC-3s were modified with an 'airstair', a door that doubled as a staircase for passengers. The airstair eliminated waiting for a ground crew to roll a wheeled staircase up to the plane.

In August 1953, a daily Southwest DC-3 was scheduled from San Francisco International Airport to Los Angeles International Airport in 3 hours and 45 minutes with eight stops.

=== Pioneering instrument landings ===
The airline's innovative spirit extended into air safety, as well: in December 1947, a Southwest Airways DC-3 flying into the coastal town of Arcata made the world's first blind landing by a scheduled commercial airliner using ground-controlled approach radar, instrument landing system devices, and Fog Investigation and Dispersal Operation (FIDO) oil-burning units adjacent to the runway. By the following year, the airline had made 1,200 routine instrument landings at the often fog-shrouded Arcata airport.

By 1948 Southwest had a fleet of 10 planes, all Douglas DC-3s, and was flying between 24 airports in California and Oregon, becoming the second-largest feeder airline in the United States.

=== Crash of Flight 7 ===
The airline had no fatal accidents until the evening of April 6, 1951, when Southwest Airways Flight 7 crashed, killing all 19 passengers and three crew members, including twelve military personnel. The DC-3 was flying a 20-minute leg in California between Santa Maria and Santa Barbara. The aircraft struck a ridge in the Refugio Pass region of the Santa Ynez Mountains at an elevation of 2,740 ft (835 m), far below the minimum nighttime altitude of 4,000 ft (1,220 m) prescribed for the route over that stretch of mountains. The Civil Aeronautics Board was unable to determine the cause.

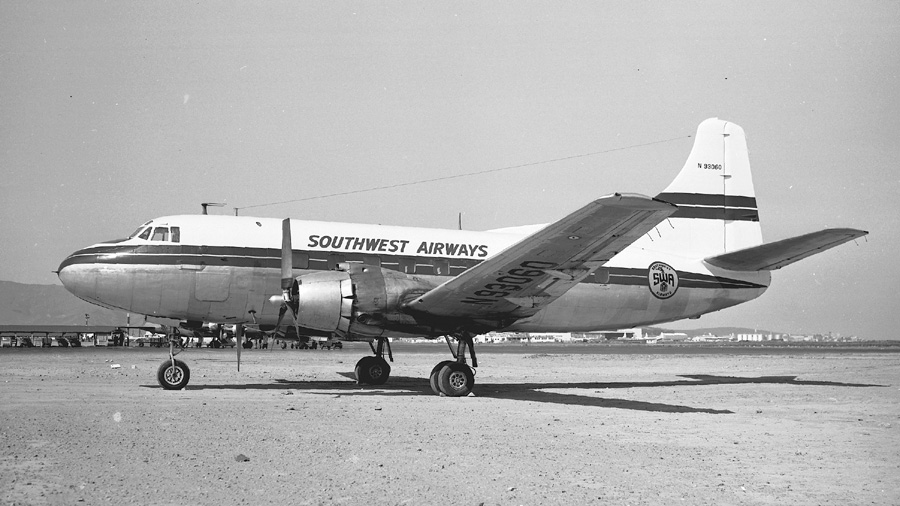
Martin 2-0-2

=== Fleet expansion ===
By late 1952, the airline's fleet included eight secondhand piston-engined Martin 2-0-2s, faster and larger than the DC-3. (Note: The Martin 2-0-2s had airstairs like the DC-3, but unlike the DC-3s, the Martin planes had tricycle landing gear, so the airstair was underneath the tail instead of on the side of the fuselage. (photo)) In the 1950s, the airline's literature said it reached 33 California locales (i.e. 24 airports) and timetables in the mid-1950s boasted that Southwest Airways "serves more California cities than any other scheduled airline."

== Pacific Air Lines era (1958–1968) ==
Pacific Air Lines logo from March 1958

The airline became Pacific Air Lines on March 6, 1958; the corporate logo was changed from an earth-toned Thunderbird reminiscent of a Navajo sandpainting to a simpler, modern design with bright colors. To prevent the flying public from confusing the newly named Pacific Air Lines for a brand-new airline, company timetables in 1959 said the company was in its "17th year of scheduled service". (Note: The airline overstated by several years the actual amount of time they had been in scheduled passenger service. This reminder to the public of the airline's longevity, accurate or not, continued on timetable covers until mid-1964.(see Collector's Guide to Airline Timetables))

Like other local-service airlines, Pacific was subsidized; in 1962, its operating "revenues" of $12.1 million included $4.1 million in federal subsidy.

=== Prop and turboprop transition ===
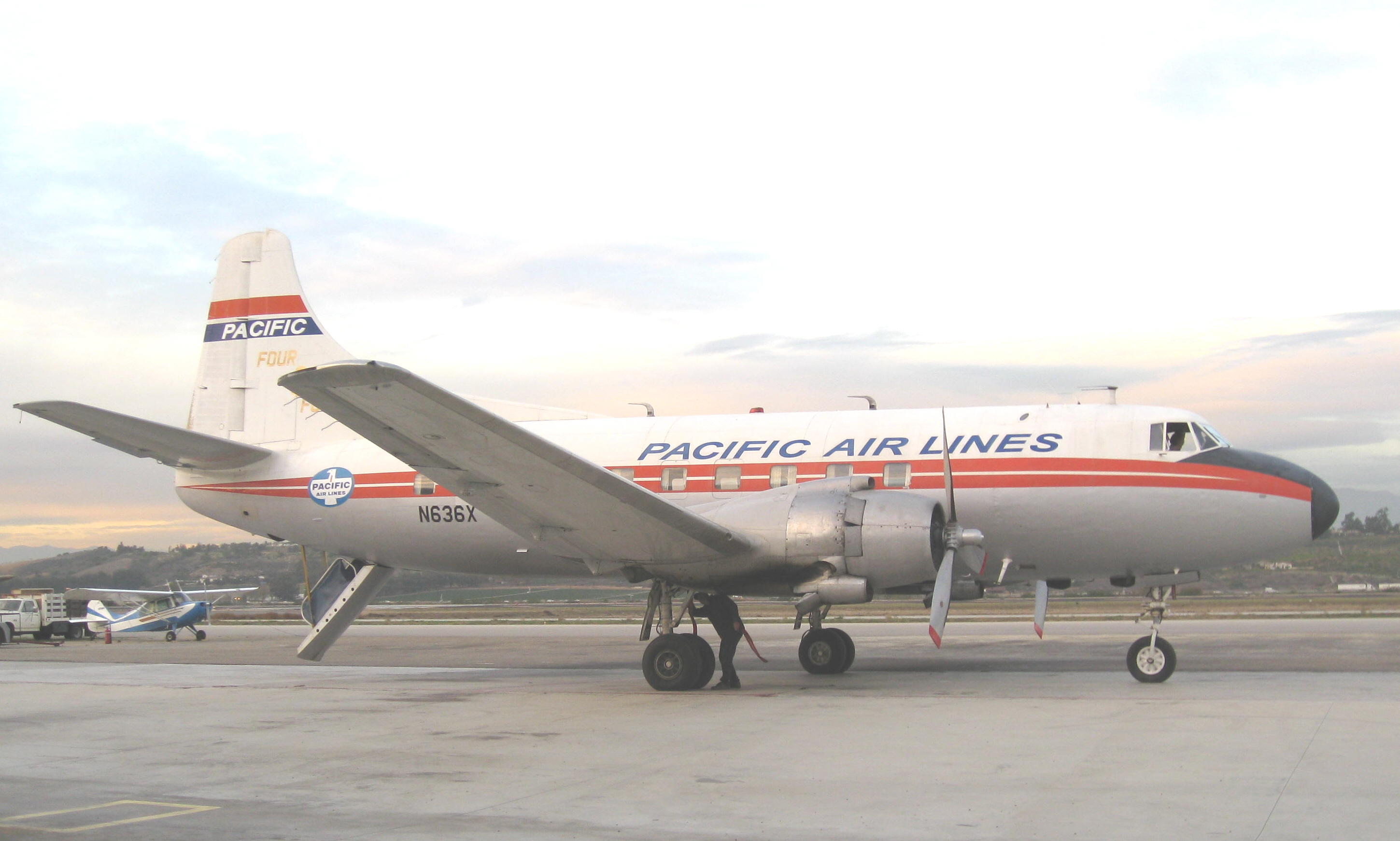
Martin 4-0-4 in Pacific Air Lines colors at Camarillo, California, January 3, 2008: A lowered airstair is below the tail

In 1959 Pacific added the first of 14 secondhand pressurized Martin 4-0-4s. Pacific's first turbine airliner, the Fairchild F-27 (a U.S.-built version of the Dutch-manufactured Fokker F27 Friendship) was added to the fleet. In 1960 a phase-out of the thirteen DC-3s began: the last DC-3 flight was in 1962 and the last Martin 2-0-2s were retired in March 1964. The Martin 4-0-4s and Fairchild F-27s became the workhorses of Pacific's fleet. One F-27 in summer 1964 flew Reno-Lake Tahoe-Sacramento-San Francisco-San Jose-Fresno-Bakersfield-Burbank-Los Angeles-San Diego. It left Reno at 6:00 am and was scheduled into San Diego at 12:10 pm. Pacific's fleet became all-turbine after their last Martin 4-0-4 was retired in April 1967.

According to the airline's timetables, flights to Las Vegas started in 1957, to Reno and San Diego in 1962, and to Lake Tahoe in 1964. Medford and Portland, Oregon, and Las Vegas and Reno, Nevada, were Pacific's only destinations outside of California.

=== Crash of Flight 308 ===
A Pacific Air Lines DC-3 operating as Flight 308 carrying three crew and 17 passengers crashed on October 26, 1959, killing the co-pilot. The plane was taking off from Santa Maria, California when the number five cylinder of the left engine failed, and severe buffeting began shaking the aircraft. The captain was forced to make an emergency landing about 1.5 miles (2.4 km) north of the airport, during which the plane cartwheeled to the left on its nose, causing severe damage. The co-pilot was killed, the captain was severely injured, and the purser and passengers suffered injuries of varying severity.

The investigation into the crash determined the probable cause was that "following the failure of the left engine, the left engine's ring cowl was deformed causing a buffeting and drag condition that made sustained flight impossible." A contributing factor was "scheduling of the flight by the company when there should have been reasonable doubt concerning the airworthiness of an engine." As a result of the crash, Pacific Air Lines stopped using contracted maintenance at Los Angeles (where the DC-3 was based) and sent its own personnel there to perform all future work on company aircraft.

=== Hijacking attempt ===
The first U.S. aircraft hijacking attempt took place on board Pacific Air Lines flight 327 on the ground at the Chico Municipal Airport in Chico, California, on July 31, 1961. The hijacker shot both the pilot and a ticket agent, but the copilot and passengers overpowered the assailant while the plane was on the ground.

=== Crash of Flight 773 ===
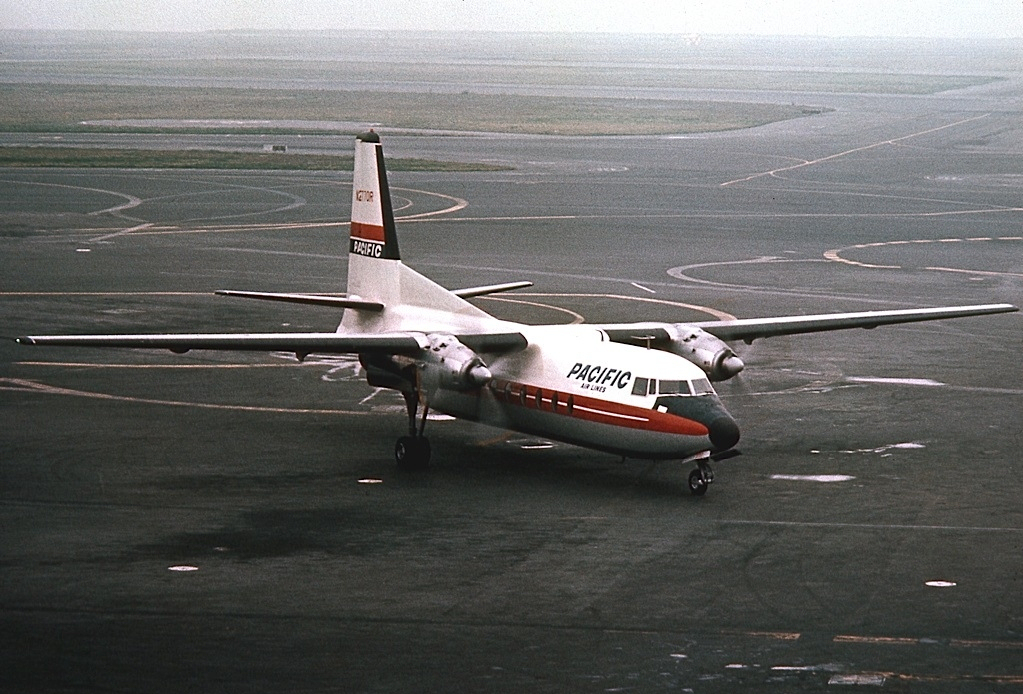
F-27A at San Francisco in 1962

On May 7, 1964, Pacific Flight 773 crashed nearly San Ramon, California, east of Oakland. All 44 aboard the Fairchild F-27 were killed when the aircraft dove into a hillside near vertically. Investigators found a gun in the wreckage, and the FBI determined that a suicidal passenger shot both of the pilots, and then himself, causing the plane to dive out of control.

=== Boeing 727s ===
New logo

On September 13, 1965, Pacific Air Lines announced it would acquire six new Boeing 727-100 jets, leasing two immediately and placing orders for the others to be delivered in early 1968. The jets were ordered during a prosperous time for the airline, but net income for Pacific dropped from $700,337 in 1965 to $150,716, chiefly because the 727 was uneconomical on Pacific's routes. Two were leased to National Airlines.

The airline promoted the Boeing 727 in a 1966 print ad: "Pacific Air Lines jets to more California cities any other airline." The ad stated that Pacific 727s served Fresno, Bakersfield, Monterey, Lake Tahoe, Los Angeles, San Francisco, San Jose, and Santa Barbara. Pacific planned to order Boeing 737-200s, more economical than the 727s, but events overtook the airline and the order was cancelled.

=== Controversial ad campaign ===
In 1967 the airline embarked on a controversial advertising campaign, including a full-page ad in the New York Times on April 28, 1967, that highlighted the fear of flying, a subject rarely mentioned by airlines. Pacific had hired award-winning advertising executive and comedian Stan Freberg for the ad campaign, knowing that unconventional ideas were his forté. Under his direction, print advertisements said:

Hey there! You with the sweat in your palms. It's about time an airline faced up to something: Most people are scared witless of flying. Deep down inside, every time that big plane lifts off that runway, they wonder if this is it, right? You want to know something, fella? So does the pilot, deep down inside.

The copy from another ad said:

Hey there, you with the sweat in your palms. Do you wish the pilot would knock off all that jazz about 'That's Crater Lake on the left, ladies and gentlemen,' and tell you instead what the devil that funny noise was you just heard?

To complement the ad campaign, flight attendants handed out "survival kits" featuring hot-pink lunch pails containing a small security blanket, a "lucky" rabbit's foot, the best-selling book The Power of Positive Thinking, and a fortune cookie containing the slogan "It could be worse. The pilot could be whistling 'The High and the Mighty'." The attendants were also encouraged to exclaim "We made it! How about that!" upon landing. Freberg had unfulfilled plans to paint a Pacific Boeing 727 to resemble a locomotive, with wheels on the fuselage and a cowcatcher on the nose. Inside the cabin, passengers would have heard a recording of a steam locomotive over the loudspeakers.

Matthew E. McCarthy, Pacific's chief executive and biggest shareholder, explained the campaign: "It's basically honest. We spoof the passengers' concern, but at least we admit they have it." Philip H. Dougherty, writing in the Business and Finance section of the May 1 edition of The New York Times, described the advertisements as "rather shocking". Objections to the unorthodox campaign were raised at a May 1967 stockholders meeting, and two Pacific Air Lines executives resigned in the wake of the controversy.

== Merger ==
When the Boeing 727 jet order was announced by the airline in 1965, it was unforeseen that a change in the business climate was on the horizon and that economic realities would dictate that some of the jets would not fly for Pacific. Stiff competition from rivals such as Pacific Southwest Airlines (PSA) and United Air Lines were factors in Pacific Air Lines joining forces with Bonanza Air Lines and West Coast Airlines in a three-way merger into Air West in 1968. Air West became Hughes Airwest after its acquisition by Howard Hughes in 1970 and merged into Republic Airlines in 1980. Republic was acquired by Northwest Airlines in 1987, and Northwest merged into Delta Air Lines in 2008. At the time of the Air West merger, Pacific's fleet included 11 Fairchild F-27s, five Martin 4-0-4s, and three Boeing 727-100s, one of which was still leased out, but returned to Air West in late 1968. The last of the Martins were not carried forward into the Air West fleet and were disposed of in August 1968.

The two cofounders of Southwest Airways died within nine months of each other in 1971. John Connelly was 71, and Leland Hayward was 68.

== Destinations in 1968 ==
The April 28, 1968, timetable lists Pacific Air Lines flights to the following just before its merger. Three-letter airport identifiers are taken from the Official Airline Guide (OAG).

California:

- Bakersfield (BFL)
- Burbank - (BUR), now Bob Hope Airport
- Chico (CIC)
- Crescent City (CEC)
- Eureka/Arcata (ACV)
- Fresno (FAT)
- Inyokern (IYK)
- Lake Tahoe (TVL)
- Long Beach (LGB)
- Los Angeles (LAX)
- Marysville/Yuba City (MYV)
- Monterey (MRY)
- Oxnard/Ventura (OXR)
- Palmdale/Lancaster (WJF) - served via General William J. Fox Airfield
- Paso Robles (PRB) - San Luis Obispo was served via Paso Robles
- Redding (RDD) - Red Bluff was served via Redding
- Sacramento (SMF)
- San Diego (SAN)
- San Francisco (SFO) - headquarters for the airline
- San Jose (SJC)
- Santa Barbara (SBA)
- Santa Maria (SMX)
- Santa Rosa (STS)
- Stockton - (SCK)
- Vandenberg Air Force Base (VBG) - Passenger access was restricted: "The right of passengers to enplane or deplane at Vandenberg AFB is subject to Military Security Control."

Nevada:

- Las Vegas (LAS)
- Reno (RNO)

Oregon:

- Portland (PDX)

== Fleet ==
- Boeing 727-100 - only jet operated by the airline
- Douglas DC-3 (operated by predecessor Southwest Airways and also by Pacific Air Lines, the air carrier also operated the C-47 version of the DC-3)
- Fairchild F-27
- Martin 2-0-2 (operated by Southwest and by Pacific)
- Martin 4-0-4 (operated by Southwest and by Pacific)

== See also ==
- List of defunct airlines of the United States
