= Wiggins Airways =

US passenger airline (1949–1953), now a cargo carrier

IATA	ICAO	Call sign
WG	WIG	WIGGINS AIRWAYS
- Founded: December 2, 1930; 95 years ago (incorporated as E.W. Wiggins Airways)
- Operating bases: Manchester-Boston Regional Airport, T.F. Green International Airport
- Fleet size: 15
- Parent company: Ameriflight (2014–2024)
- Key people: Elmer W. Wiggins; Paul Halter
- Website: wiggins-air.com

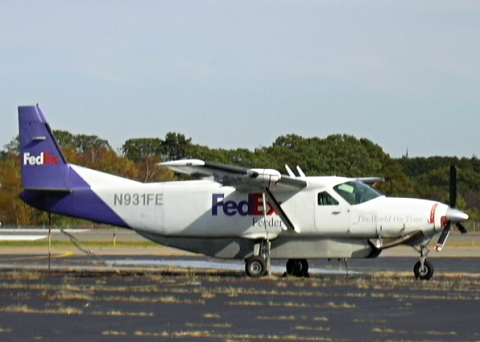
Cessna 208 flown by Wiggins for FedEx at Portland, Maine in 2005

Wiggins Airways is an American cargo airline and fixed-base operator. It is an operating base of Ameriflight.

== History ==
=== Startup ===
The business was incorporated in Massachusetts on 2 December 1930 as E.W. Wiggins Airways, Inc. by president Elmer W. Wiggins, with its principal office in Leominster, MA. The proposed business of the corporation was a many-hundred word comprehensive description of apparently every type of aviation-related business, covering everything from gliders to helicopters (a dozen years before the first mass-produced helicopter) to dirigibles and rocketships, including manufacturing, leasing, operating, financing, fueling, sales and more. Starting in the 1930s, Wiggins was a fixed base operator, including pilot instruction. During World War II it built aircraft parts and trained pilots for the military. By 1944, the company had moved to Norwood.

=== Scheduled passenger airline ===
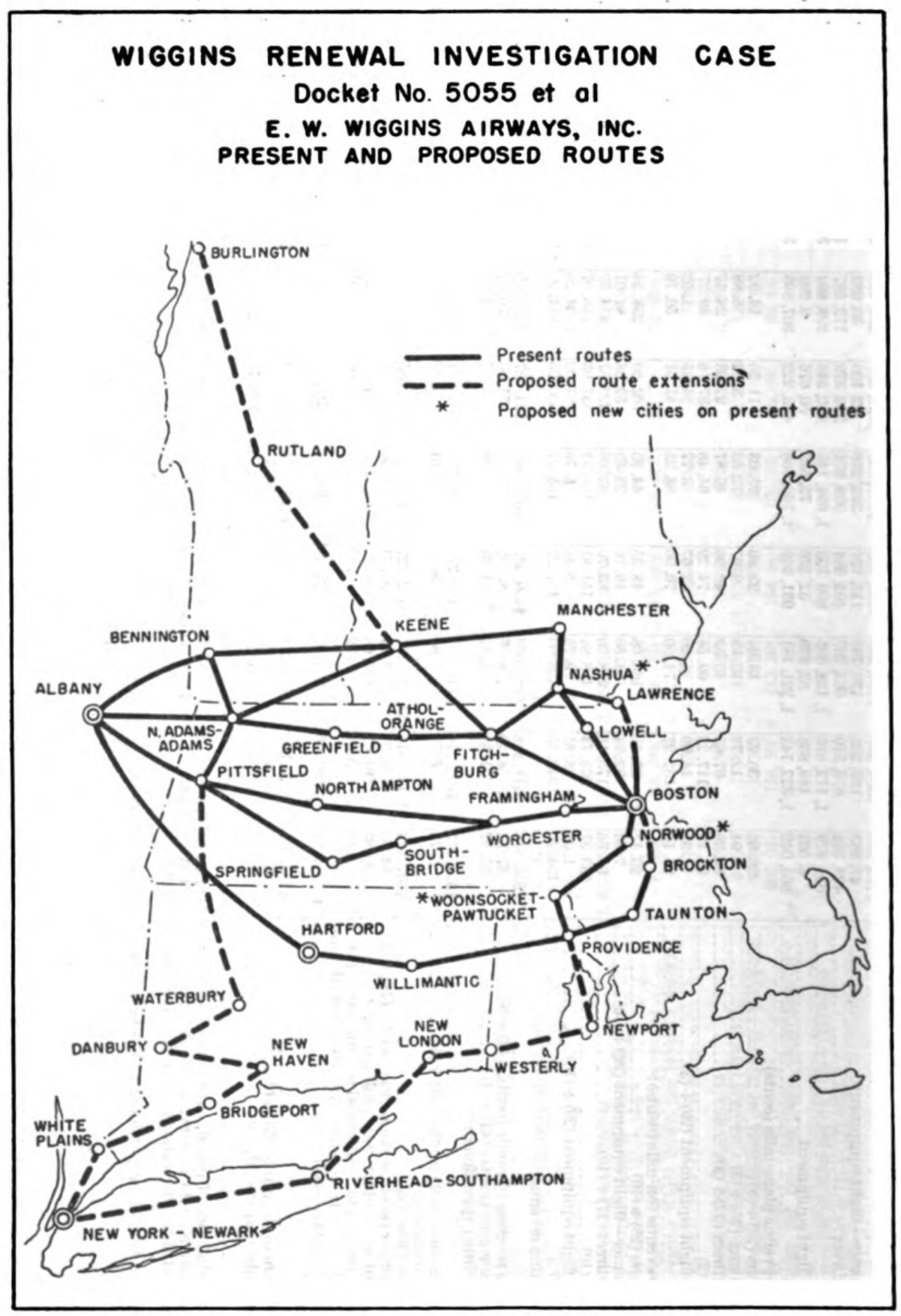
Wiggins Airways final route network from the 1952 CAB case that denied its certificate extension

In June 1946, the CAB certificated Wiggins as a local service carrier to fly several passenger routes between Boston and Albany. Founder Elmer Wiggins died just prior to the public hearings for the CAB case that produced the certification. The company wanted to use Douglas DC-3s for the routes, but was frustrated by lack of adequate airports. In 1949, the CAB said it would accept the use of smaller aircraft. After Wiggins experimented with several types, it was found that the four-passenger Cessna T-50 was able to safely operate into the rudimentary airports available and climb fast enough to scale mountainous territory. While a twin-engine aircraft, it was of wood and fabric construction, unattractive to passengers.

See External links for a link to a photo of Wiggins Airways aircraft of this era.

Scheduled service finally started on 19 September 1949. The basic problem for Wiggins was that few flew the carrier. Even after the airline had been further developed, in 1951 and 1952, an average of fewer than 10 people boarded Wiggins per day, across the whole system. Since passenger revenue was extremely low, the postal subsidy (by which all local service carriers were then supported) was unacceptably high per pound of mail. This was the same basic problem that the CAB had faced previously with both Florida Airways in 1949 and Mid-West Airlines in 1952, and had the same result. In a decision reached in October 1952, the CAB said it would not renew the Wiggins certification. In the same decision, it allowed that there was intrinsic demand from Albany to Boston, just not the way Wiggins was flying, and handed a route between the two to Mohawk Airlines. As with the 1952 decision to not extend Mid-West's certification, the five members of the Board split 3–2, with the same minority members with the same dissenting opinion: Wiggins deserved a shot at flying DC-3s and could be expected eventually to do well with them.

Wiggins and the states of New Hampshire, Rhode Island and Vermont plus several New England cities asked for reconsideration, but in July 1953 the Board affirmed its decision. Wiggins flew its last scheduled flight on July 31, 1953. Wiggins was the last of three local service carriers (of the 19 that initiated CAB-certificated service) to have the CAB refuse to renew their certificates. However, unlike Florida Airways and Mid-West, Wiggins did not liquidate as a result, having other healthy lines of business.

=== New Hampshire ===
Wiggins was drawn to New Hampshire by flying feeder cargo aircraft for FedEx Express and UPS Airlines. This started in the 1980s – and by 1990, Wiggins had contracts at Manchester-Boston Regional Airport (MHT) with both FedEx Express and UPS; that same year, the airline officially changed its name to Wiggins Airways, Inc. This led the airline to buy Stead Aviation, an MHT fixed base operator, in 1997, with the intention of moving the airline to Manchester. Wiggins built a new headquarters, general aviation terminal and hangar, opening the complex in 1999. Wiggins opened a new aviation fuel farm at MHT in 2004. In the same year, the company finally reincorporated in New Hampshire.

Wiggins Airways was bought out by its employees in the creation of an Employee Share Ownership Plan in 1985. Wiggins employed over 160 people during this time.

=== Ameriflight era ===
In December 2014, Ameriflight acquired Wiggins Airways (at the time comprising 48 aircraft and 100 employees), which resulted in Ameriflight becoming the largest regional air cargo carrier in the world, with 218 aircraft. Ameriflight elected not to continue to operate Wiggins' FBO and airline service departments, selling those departments to Signature Flight Support.

While Signature Flight Support operates fueling and deicing services to aircraft flying into Manchester Boston Regional Airport, Wiggins Airways does maintenance on their fleet of Beechcraft 99s, as well as servicing the airlines that serve the airport and general aviation aircraft.

In February 2024, Wiggins Airways flew its final FedEx revenue run, signaling the separation of the two companies. The final C208 was flown out to Akron Canton Airport on March 13, 2024, ending the connection between FedEx and Wiggins Airways. On June 1, 2024, Ameriflight announced it would transition Wiggins to becoming simply an operating base of Ameriflight.

== Fleet ==
1987-88 World Airline Fleets (copyright 1987) lists the E.W. Wiggins Airways dba Wiggins Airways with a fleet as follows, the Cessna Caravan noted as being flown for FedEx Express:

- 5 Bell 206
- 1 Cessna Caravan
- 2 DHC-6 Twin Otter Cargo
- 1 Piper Aztec

As of 3 June 2024, the Federal Aviation Administration lists Wiggins as flying 12 Beechcraft 99s and three Cessna Caravans under Part 135 of the Federal Aviation Regulations, the Caravans with Fedex registrations.

== Routes ==
The route map from Wiggins time as a scheduled airline in 1949–1953 is shown above. Shown below are the current routes flown by Wiggins Airways on behalf of Ameriflight.

Routes operated by Wiggins Airways (FedEx)
Origin	Destination	Returns to origin after unload?
Manchester-Boston Regional Airport (KMHT) (Manchester, NH)	Bangor International Airport (KBGR) (Bangor, ME)	Yes
Manchester-Boston Regional Airport (KMHT) (Manchester, NH)	Burlington International Airport (KBTV) (Burlington, VT)*	Yes
Manchester-Boston Regional Airport (KMHT) (Manchester, NH)	Edward F. Knapp State Airport (KMPV) (Montpelier, VT)	Yes
Manchester-Boston Regional Airport (KMHT) (Manchester, NH)	Auburn/Lewiston Municipal Airport (KLEW) (Auburn, ME)	Yes
Manchester-Boston Regional Airport (KMHT) (Manchester, NH)	Knox County Regional Airport (KRKD) (Rockland, ME)	Yes
Manchester-Boston Regional Airport (KMHT) (Manchester, NH)	Portland International Jetport (KPWM) (Portland, ME	Yes
Manchester-Boston Regional Airport (KMHT) (Manchester, NH)	Rutland Southern Vermont Regional Airport (KRUT) (Rutland, VT)	Yes
Manchester-Boston Regional Airport (KMHT) (Manchester, NH)	Presque Isle International Airport (KPQI) (Presque Isle, ME)	Yes
Manchester-Boston Regional Airport (KMHT) (Manchester, NH)	Waterville Robert LaFleur Airport (KWVL) (Waterville, ME)	Yes
T.F. Green Airport (KACK) (Providence, RI)	Nantucket Memorial Airport (KACK) (Nantucket, MA)	Yes

Note: * denotes a route flown on demand (Ad-hoc) by UPS

== Accidents ==
- On August 22, 2023, while operating a training flight from Lewiston-Auburn Airport, Wiggins Air Flight 634 crashed in a wooded area in Litchfield, ME. The aircraft involved was a Beechcraft Model 99. The aircraft was totally destroyed after entering a steep dive while conducting training, almost disintegrating on impact. Both occupants were killed in the crash.
- On January 26, 2024, a Wiggins Airways Beech C99 cargo flight from Manchester-Boston Regional Airport to Presque Isle International Airport crashed in Londonderry, NH into wooded terrain, destroying the aircraft and severely injuring the sole pilot on board. After takeoff, the aircraft broadcast an emergency transponder code then flew erratically for 16 minutes before crashing. Investigations after revealed the pilot's door had become detached, resulting in control difficulties until the plane crashed.
