= Florida Airways (1947–1949) =

Short-lived US local service carrier (1947–1949)

- Founded: 21 January 1946
- Commenced operations: January 10, 1947
- Ceased operations: March 28, 1949
- Operating bases: Orlando Cannon Mills Airport
- Fleet size: see Fleet
- Destinations: see Destinations
- Headquarters: Orlando, Florida; United States
- Founder: Thomas E. Gordon
- Employees: 85

Florida Airways was a brief-lived United States local service carrier, also known as a feeder airline. On March 28, 1946, the US Civil Aeronautics Board (CAB), the now defunct federal agency that, at that time, tightly regulated almost all US commercial air transportation, certificated Thomas E. Gordon, dba Orlando Airlines to provide air service from Orlando, Florida to points in central and north Florida for a three-year period. Gordon beat out competition from trunk carrier National Airlines and from another local service carrier, Southern Airways, for the routes. Gordon owned a fixed-base operator at Orlando Cannon Mills Airport.

Gordon transferred the certification to Florida Airways, Inc., which had incorporated in Florida on 21 January 1946. Operations started 10 January 1947. Florida Airlines had the smallest route network of any local service carrier. Some had route mileages over eight times that of Florida Airways.

However on March 7, 1949, the CAB declined to renew Florida Airways certification, forcing the airline to stop flying on March 28, 1949, the three-year anniversary of the original certification award. At the time, there were seven CAB-certificated local service airlines in operation, and the CAB said Florida Airways was by far the least economic of these carriers, based on failure to generate sufficient revenue. All such carriers were subsidized via payments from the US Post Office Department to carry air mail, and the post office department concurred with the CAB that Florida Airways service was not worth it. Florida Airways average flight length was only 46 miles, making it particularly susceptible to competition from ground transportation.

Florida Airways thus flew its last flights on March 28, 1949. At the time it had a fleet of five Beech 18 aircraft and 85 employees. The CAB had previously rejected, in September 1948, an earlier attempt by Florida Airways to extend its certificate, so the airline knew its end was likely. In December 1948, the airline asked the CAB to transfer to it the certification of Southern Airways, which had been certificated 21 months earlier but had yet to start service. The CAB declined.

Florida Airways was one of three local service carriers (out of 19 that started CAB-certificated operations) that failed to have initial certification extended by the CAB, the other two being Mid-West Airlines and Wiggins Airways.

== Fleet ==
- 5 Beech 18

== Destinations ==
A Florida Airways timetable from 5 April 1948 shows the following central and north Florida destinations:

- Deland
- Gainesville
- Jacksonville
- Lake City
- Leesburg
- Ocala
- Orlando base
- Palatka
- Perry
- Sanford
- St Augustine
- Tallahassee

== See also ==
- local service carrier
- List of defunct airlines of the United States
