= Lake Central Airlines =

US airline (1950–1968) that merged into Allegheny

IATA	ICAO	Call sign
LC^{(1)}	LC^{(1)}	LAKE CENTRAL
- Commenced operations: 1950; 76 years ago
- Ceased operations: June 1, 1968; 58 years ago
- Operating bases: Weir Cook Airport (now Indianapolis International Airport)
- Fleet size: Douglas DC-3, Convair 340, Convair 580, Beechcraft Bonanza, Nord 262.
- Parent company: Employee owned
- Headquarters: Indianapolis, Indiana, United States

Notes
- (1) IATA, ICAO codes were the same until the 1980s

Lake Central Airlines was a local service carrier and scheduled airline that served multiple locations throughout the midwestern and eastern United States from 1950 to 1968, when it then merged into Allegheny Airlines. In 1979 Allegheny became USAir, and in 1997, USAir became US Airways. In 2015, US Airways was acquired by American Airlines through a merging of the two companies.

== History ==
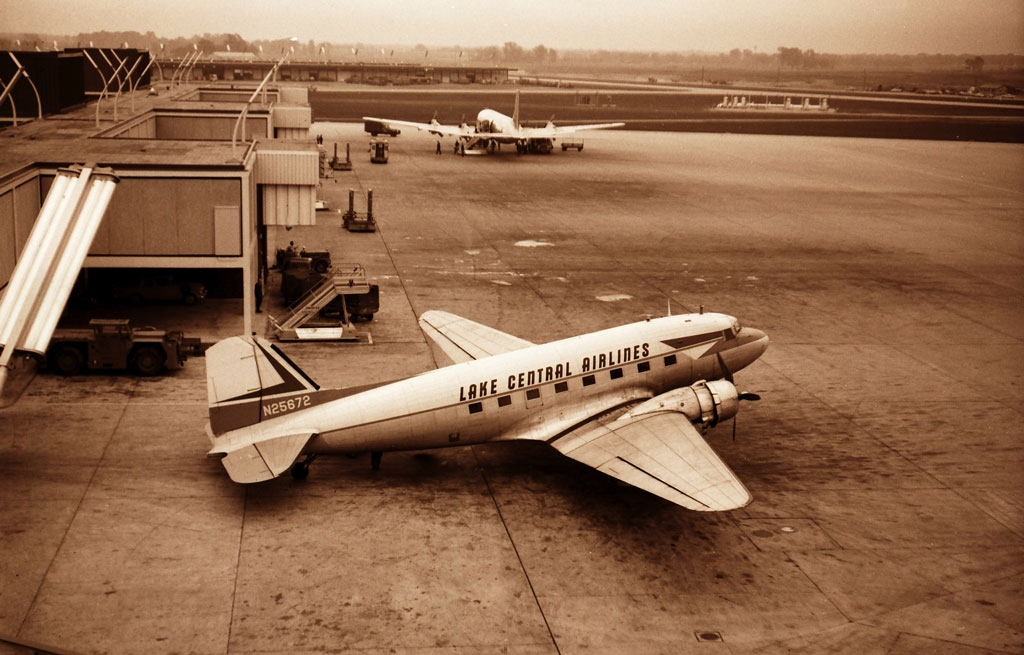
DC-3 at Chicago O'Hare 1962

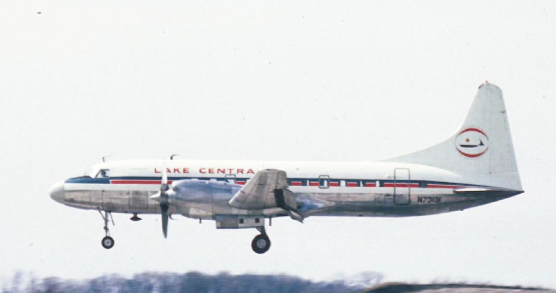
Convair 580 at Columbus 1968

The airline was founded as Turner Airlines in 1948; it was based at Weir Cook Airport (now Indianapolis International Airport) in Indianapolis, Indiana. Lake Central's network in the 1950s extended from Chicago to Pittsburgh; in August 1953 it had scheduled flights to 21 airports, and in May 1968, this number increased to 39.

Like other local service airlines regulated by the federal Civil Aeronautics Board, Lake Central was subsidized; in 1962 its revenue of $10.8 million included $4.2 million of "pub. serv. rev.".

In February 1955 Lake Central Airlines became the first employee-owned scheduled airline in the history of the air transport industry. 162 employees (65% of the total) bought 97.5% of the outstanding stock, 25% outright, and the rest financed over 24 months.

Effective July 1, 1968, the airline was acquired by and merged into Allegheny Airlines. Allegheny later closed the Indianapolis base and sold the Nord 262s, which had proven unreliable. Lake Central had planned on acquiring new Boeing 737-200s, but the order was cancelled.

== Fleet ==
Lake Central flew Douglas DC-3s, Convair 340s, Convair 580s, Beechcraft Bonanzas, and Nord 262s. DC-3 flights ended in 1967, and by spring of 1968 Lake Central had an all-turboprop fleet of Convair 580s and Nord 262s.

=== Historical fleet ===
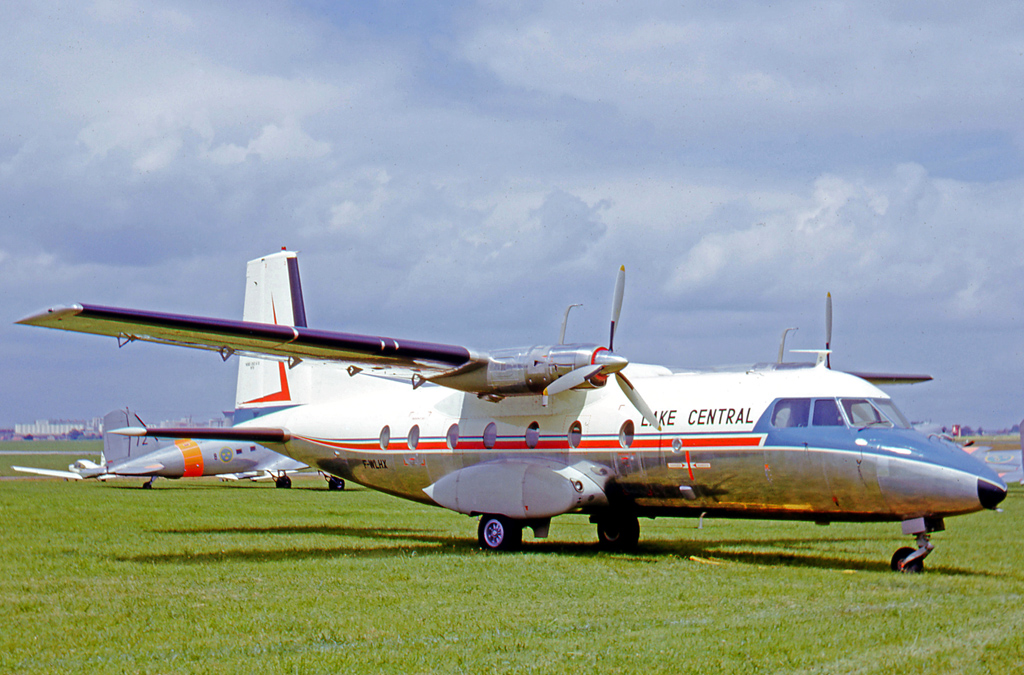
Lake Central's first Nord 262 was delivered in August 1965

Lake Central Airlines previously operated the following aircraft:

- 8 Convair CV-340
- 4 Convair CV-580
- 1 Curtiss C-46 Commando (N1802M)
- 14 Douglas DC-3
- 5 Douglas C-47 Skytrain
- 3 Douglas C-53 Skytrooper
- 12 Nord 262A

== Destinations in 1968 ==
Shortly before the merger into Allegheny Airlines, Lake Central was serving the following cities with an all-turboprop fleet, mainly consisting of Convair 580 and Nord 262 aircraft, according to its April 28, 1968 timetable:

- Akron/Canton, Ohio
- Baltimore, Maryland
- Bloomington, Indiana
- Buffalo, New York
- Charleston, West Virginia
- Chicago, Illinois (Chicago O'Hare Airport)
- Cincinnati, Ohio - hub
- Clarksburg, West Virginia
- Cleveland, Ohio
- Columbus, Ohio - hub
- Danville, Illinois
- Dayton, Ohio
- Detroit, Michigan
- Elkins, West Virginia
- Erie, Pennsylvania
- Evansville, Indiana
- Grand Rapids, Michigan
- Indianapolis, Indiana - hub & airline headquarters
- Kalamazoo, Michigan
- Kokomo, Indiana
- Lafayette, Indiana
- Lima, Ohio
- Louisville, Kentucky
- Mansfield, Ohio
- Marion, Indiana
- Martinsburg, West Virginia
- Morgantown, West Virginia
- Muncie, Indiana
- Parkersburg, West Virginia
- Pittsburgh, Pennsylvania
- Portsmouth, Ohio
- St. Louis, Missouri
- South Bend, Indiana
- Terre Haute, Indiana
- Toledo, Ohio
- Washington, D.C. (Washington National Airport)
- Wheeling, West Virginia
- Youngstown, Ohio
- Zanesville, Ohio

== Accidents and incidents ==
- On March 5, 1967, Lake Central Flight 527, a Convair 580, crashed near Marseilles, Ohio, with the loss of all 38 passengers and crew.

== See also ==
- List of defunct airlines of the United States
