= Morgantown Municipal Airport =

Morgantown Municipal Airport Walter L. Bill Hart Field

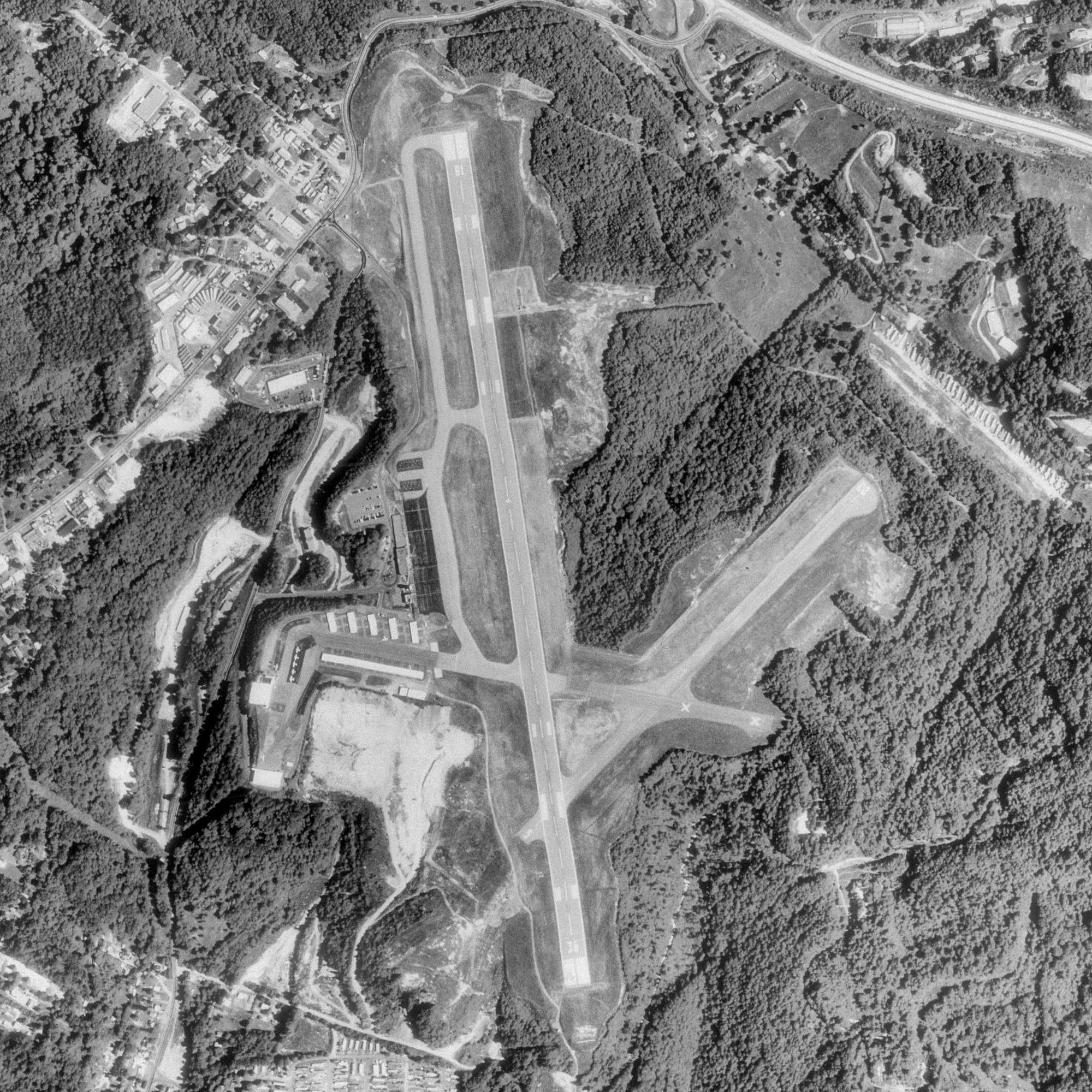
- USGS 1988 orthophoto
- IATA: MGW; ICAO: KMGW; FAA LID: MGW

Summary
- Airport type: Public
- Owner: City of Morgantown
- Serves: Morgantown, West Virginia
- Elevation AMSL: 1,244 ft (379 m)
- Coordinates: 39°38′34″N 079°54′59″W
- Website: www.morgantownairport.com

Maps
- FAA airport diagram
- Interactive map of Morgantown Municipal Airport

Runways
Direction	Length		Surface
Direction	ft	m	Surface
18/36	5,199	1,585	Asphalt

Statistics
- Aircraft operations (2022): 59,641
- Based aircraft (2024): 23
- Source: Federal Aviation Administration

Morgantown Municipal Airport (IATA: MGW, ICAO: KMGW, FAA LID: MGW) is three miles east of Morgantown, in Monongalia County, West Virginia. It is also known as Walter L. Bill Hart Field. It sees one passenger airline, United Express operated by Skywest Airlines, which is subsidized by the Essential Air Service program.

The FAA's National Plan of Integrated Airport Systems for 2021–2025 categorized it as a nonprimary commercial service airport (fewer than 10,000 enplanements per year).

The airport's runway cannot handle larger airplanes, but it has filed a request with the Federal Aviation Administration to lengthen the runway by 1,001 feet (305 m).

== Facilities ==
The airport covers 494 acres (200 ha) at an elevation of 1,244 feet (379 m) above sea level. Its single runway, 18/36, is 5,199 feet (1,585 m) by 150 feet (46 m).

In the year ending December 31, 2022, the airport had 59,641 aircraft operations, an average of 163 per day: 56% general aviation, 41% air taxi and 3% military. In January 2024, there were 23 aircraft based at this airport: 22 single-engine and 1 multi-engine.

In January 2008 a $1.9 million federal grant was awarded for an access road between the airport and Interstate 68.

== Historical airline service ==
The first passenger airline flights were on Capital Airlines using Douglas DC-3s in 1949. Lake Central Airlines replaced Capital in 1961 and merged into Allegheny Airlines in 1968. Aeromech Airlines began service as Allegheny Commuter in the late 1960's supplementing Allegheny Airlines and replaced Allegheny in 1979 flying to Pittsburgh and Washington National Airport. Aeromech ended their affiliation as Allegheny Commuter in 1981 and merged into Wright Air Lines in 1983. Wright ended all service in 1984. Christman Airlines also served Morgantown for a brief period during 1984.

Colgan Airlines began service to Washington National in late 1984 and Crown Airways began service as Allegheny Commuter to Pittsburgh in early 1985. Allegheny Commuter became USAir Express in 1989. Colgan began code-sharing with Continental Airlines as Continental Express in 1987 then switched to United Airlines as United Express in 1988. Colgan's service ended in late 1989. Jet Express, operating on behalf of TWA as Trans World Express then operated the route to Washington National from 1990 through 1992. Crown Airways then picked up the route to Washington National and was bought out by Mesa Airlines in 1994, also operating as USAir Express which later became US Airways Express. Mesa's service as US Airways Express was later replaced by Air Midwest and service ended in 2006.

RegionsAir flew as Continental Connection between Morgantown and Cleveland from June, 2006 to March 2007. Colgan Air flew as US Airways Express between Morgantown and Pittsburgh from May 2007 to January 2008. Colgan Air then switched to fly as United Express between Morgantown and Washington–Dulles beginning in January 2008. These flights ended in May 2012.

Silver Airways then flew as United Express from Morgantown to Washington–Dulles and Clarksburg beginning in mid-2012. The code-share with United ended in late 2014 and Silver began operating under their own brand. In June 2016, City of Morgantown employees began looking at other air carriers to replace Silver Airways because of Silver Airways' increasingly poor reliability. Airport officials received proposals from five interested airlines, namely Silver Airways, Southern Airways Express, ViaAir, Boutique Air, and Corporate Flight Management. Airport officials recommended that Southern Airways Express be chosen for the next Essential Air Service contract to service the airport primarily because of the air carrier's 99.2 percent completion rate, which was higher than Silver Airways' rate that had sometimes been less than 70 percent.

Starting on November 30, 2016, Southern Airways Express began flights between Morgantown Municipal Airport and both Pittsburgh International Airport and Dulles International Airport. Pittsburgh was chosen as a destination because many people of Morgantown were used to flying out of Pittsburgh and enduring the lengthy drive, parking costs, and long lines at airport security. Southern Airways Express continued previous service to Washington–Dulles for the use of business travel and international travel pertaining to West Virginia University.

On July 31, 2017 Southern Airways Express ended service to Washington Dulles and began service to Baltimore–Washington International Airport. Connections to many low-cost carriers were seen as a positive improvements, as was the adjacent rail station that provides access to Washington Union Station near the United States Capitol. The airline reversed course on June 28, 2021 returning service to Washington Dulles.

SkyWest Airlines, operating as United Express, was awarded the EAS contract beginning December 1, 2024. The airline operates seven weekly roundtrip flights on Bombardier CRJ-200 jets each to Dulles and Chicago-O'Hare which are codeshared with United Airlines. City manager Kim Haws said SkyWest expected to exceed 10,000 enplanements per year from Morgantown, which would qualify the airport for additional federal funding.

== Airlines and destinations ==
=== Passenger ===
Airlines	Destinations	Refs
United Express	Chicago–O'Hare, Washington–Dulles	

== Statistics ==
Top domestic destinations from MGW (January - December 2025)
Rank	City	Passengers	Carrier
1	Chicago-O'Hare, Illinois	9,120	United
2	Washington-Dulles, Virginia	6,150	United

Passenger boardings (enplanements) by year, as per the FAA
Year	2013	2014	2015	2016	2017	2018	2019	2020	2021	2022	2023	2024
Enplanements	10,036	10,676	7,163	7,851	5,698	5,890	7,304	3,369	6,450	7,272	6,842	7,887
Change	▼1.98%	▲6.38%	▼32.91%	▲9.60%	▼27.42%	▲3.37%	▲24.00%	▼53.87%	▲91.45%	▲12.74%	▼5.91%	▲15.75%
Airline	Silver Airways dba United Express	Silver Airways dba United Express	Silver Airways	Silver Airways	Southern Airways Express	Southern Airways Express	Southern Airways Express	Southern Airways Express	Southern Airways Express	Southern Airways Express	Southern Airways Express	Southern Airways Express
Destination(s)	Clarksburg Washington-Dulles	Clarksburg Washington-Dulles	Clarksburg Parkersburg Washington-Dulles	Clarksburg Parkersburg Washington-Dulles	Pittsburgh Washington-Dulles	Baltimore Pittsburgh	Baltimore Pittsburgh	Baltimore Pittsburgh	Baltimore Pittsburgh Washington-Dulles	Pittsburgh Washington-Dulles	Pittsburgh Washington-Dulles	Pittsburgh Washington-Dulles

== Popular culture ==
- Morgantown Municipal Airport is a location in the game Fallout 76

== See also ==
- List of airports in West Virginia

== Other sources ==
- Essential Air Service documents (Docket DOT-OST-2005-20735) from the U.S. Department of Transportation:
  - Notice (March 22, 2005): of Air Midwest, Inc. of its intent to discontinue scheduled non-subsidized Essential Air Service between Morgantown, West Virginia and Pittsburgh, Pennsylvania, effective June 20, 2005.
  - Order 2005-4-19 (April 19, 2005): prohibiting Air Midwest, Inc., from terminating its unsubsidized, scheduled air service at Parkersburg, Morgantown and Clarksburg/Fairmont, West Virginia, beyond the end of its 90-day notice periods, and requesting proposals from carriers interested in providing replacement essential air service (EAS) at the communities, with or without subsidy.
  - Order 2005-9-8 (September 9, 2005): selecting RegionsAir, Inc. to provide subsidized essential air Service (EAS) at Parkersburg, Morgantown and Clarksburg/Fairmont, West Virginia for a two-year period and establishing a combined subsidy rate of $1,051,333 per year for service consisting of 18 nonstop round trips each week between Parkersburg and Cincinnati, and 18 round trips to Cincinnati each week over a MGW-CKB-CVG-CKB-MGW routing, with 34-seat Saab 340A aircraft.
  - Order 2007-1-16 (January 25, 2007): selecting Colgan Air, Inc. d/b/a US Airways Express to provide subsidized essential air service (EAS) at Parkersburg, Morgantown, and Clarksburg/Fairmont, West Virginia, for two years, beginning when the carrier inaugurates service. Each community will receive 19 weekly round trips to Pittsburgh with 34-passenger Saab 340 aircraft. Service from Parkersburg will be nonstop in each direction. Service from Morgantown and Clarksburg/Fairmont will be served with a Pittsburgh - Morgantown - Clarksburg - Pittsburgh or a Pittsburgh - Clarksburg - Morgantown - Pittsburgh routing. The total combined annual subsidy is $2,421,914.
  - Ninety-Day Notice (March 28, 2008): of intent of Colgan Air Inc. D/B/A United Express to terminate scheduled essential air service at Parkersburg, Morgantown and Clarksburg/Fairmont, WV, effective June 28, 2008.
  - Order 2008-5-37 (May 27, 2008): re-selecting Colgan Air, Inc. d/b/a United Express, to provide subsidized essential air service (EAS) at Morgantown and Clarksburg/Fairmont, West Virginia, at a total annual subsidy rate of $2,116,650, for the two-year period of June 1, 2008, through May 31, 2010,
  - Order 2010-6-25 (June 29, 2010): re-selecting Colgan Air, Inc. to provide essential air service (EAS) at Clarksburg/Fairmont and Morgantown, WV, for a combined annual subsidy of $2,976,438, and at Beckley, WV, for an annual subsidy of $2,313, 457, for the two-year period from August 1, 2010, through July 31, 2012. Also selecting Gulfstream International Airlines, Inc., to provide EAS at Parkersburg, WV/Marietta, OH, at an annual subsidy rate of $2,642,237, for a two-year period beginning when the carrier inaugurates full EAS through the end of the 24th month thereafter. The total annual subsidy for all four communities is $7,923,132.
  - Order 2012-4-32 (April 30, 2012): selecting Silver Airways to provide Essential Air Service (EAS) at Beckley, Clarksburg/Fairmont ("Clarksburg") and Morgantown, West Virginia, for a combined annual subsidy of $5,968,744 ($2,512,494 for Beckley; $3,456,250 for Clarksburg and Morgantown), for the two-year period beginning when the carrier begins full EAS at all three communities.
