= Wright Air Lines =

Cleveland-based US airline (1966–1985)

IATA	ICAO	Call sign
FW/KC	WRT	WRIGHT
- Founded: May 18, 1966; 60 years ago
- Commenced operations: June 27, 1966; 60 years ago
- Ceased operations: 1985; 41 years ago
- Operating bases: Cleveland Burke Lakefront Airport
- Headquarters: Cleveland, Ohio; United States
- Key people: Don Schneller; Gilbert Singerman
- Founder: Gerald Weller

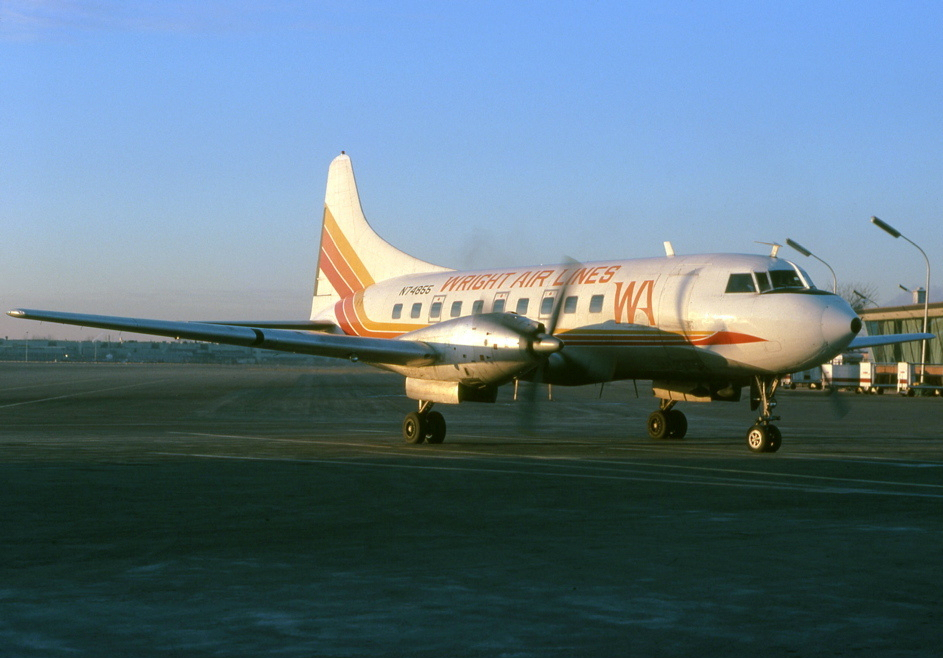
Convair 600 at Columbus 1980

On the surface, Wright Air Lines was no different than many other many other small turboprop airlines that collapsed in the early years of the deregulated US airline industry. What set Wright apart was:

- it was one of the few airlines to operate at Cleveland Burke Lakefront Airport (BKL), where the airline was born and where it died
- it originated as one of the airlines that made the route from BKL to Detroit City Airport (DET) one of the busiest small aircraft routes in the country in the 1960s
- it was a rare small airline that achieved certification by the Civil Aeronautics Board (CAB), the Federal agency that tightly regulated most airline activity prior to US airline deregulation
- the airline's collapse was accompanied by findings of fraud

== History ==
=== Weller era ===
The airline's founder and first president was Gerald Weller, who worked for a year at TAG Airlines before establishing Wright, which was incorporated on May 18, 1966. TAG had served the DET-BKL route (among others) since 1957; Wright provided competing service starting June 27, 1966, initially with a five-passenger single-engined aircraft. On June 9, even before starting service, Wright merged with Commuter Airlines, Inc. At the time, the CAB tightly regulated almost all airline service in the United States, one exception being those airlines that flew “small” aircraft (under 12,500lbs). TAG and Wright were such operators. Such airlines still needed FAA operational certification, which occurred for Wright on May 25. However, in the 1960s, traffic on the DET-BKL route rivaled that on the Cleveland-Hopkins to Detroit Metro route, at levels approaching 100,000 passengers per year, despite being provided exclusively with small aircraft. 1969 schedules show TAG scheduling 22 flights each direction on DET-BKL on weekdays, six on Saturdays, ten on Sundays.

By September 1967, Wright was flying to Pittsburgh as well as DET, up to 14/day each way to DET, four to Pittsburgh. The fleet was four Beech 18s and a Skyliner (a de Havilland Heron derivative) with four on order. Wright's competitor to Detroit, TAG, flew the smaller de Havilland Dove. Also, in 1967, Wright went public. Its registration statement was for 150,000 shares at $6. In March 1968, Wright merged with Air Commuter, with a combined network comprising DET, Pittsburgh, Youngstown, Dayton, Columbus, Lima and Findlay from BKL. Air Commuter came with “heavy financial losses” and four DHC-6 Twin Otters. In July, Wright bought Tyme Air Lines of Columbus, which flew single-engined aircraft. In January 1969, Weller trumpeted Wright's 1968 “record year” : 66,624 passengers, of which 45,421 were on BKL-DET, showing the importance of that route. Nothing was said of profitability. But in June 1969, Weller sold out to Don Schneller, an original Wright Air Lines director and bank executive.

=== Schneller era ===
==== CAB certification ====
Schneller took over knowing Wright had very likely lost a CAB certification award to its competitor, TAG. TAG and Wright petitioned the CAB for certification to fly larger aircraft on DET-BKL. Since the advent of local service carriers in the late 1940s/early 1950s, only one small airline had been so certificated within the continental US, Aspen Airways, which received CAB certification for Denver-Aspen in 1967. The CAB examiner gave an initial opinion in favor of TAG in March 1969 on the basis of TAG's superior finances, greater market longevity and plan to use superior equipment (Fokker F-27 turboprops, and possible use of Fokker F-28 jets vs Wright's plan for Convair 240 piston aircraft). It was unlikely (though not unheard of) that the board itself would overturn this finding, and generally conceded that whichever airline got the certificate would drive the other from the market. Weller and Schneller knew the CAB position by the time Weller ceded control to Schneller. Despite protests by Wright, on October 27, 1969, TAG's certification by the CAB for BKL-DET was final.

But in January 1970, one of TAG's Doves crashed through the Lake Erie ice, killing all nine on board. TAG was quickly in financial distress. In March, Wright agreed to acquire TAG for $3mm (about $20mm in 2024 dollars). In July, the slow-moving CAB rejected this seemingly sensible solution, notwithstanding TAG's imminent demise. When TAG stopped flying due to lack of financial resources, the CAB blithely ordered it back in the air. TAG had no money, so that didn't happen. The CAB, showing no flexibility whatsoever, required Wright to go through another investigation before it finally agreed to certificate Wright for DET-BKL instead, in early 1972. It was somewhat of a miracle the CAB acted at all; since 1969 it had, at industry request, been operating under a secret new route moratorium, a later notorious case of regulatory capture. The CAB had an elaborate taxonomy of the airlines it regulated. Wright was in the smallest scheduled category, generally labeled “air taxi” or similar (though the whole point of the certification was to allow Wright to operate aircraft larger than air taxis). Wright wasn't the smallest CAB airline by revenue, since CAB regulation captured some tiny Alaska carriers, but Wright was the smallest in the continental US.

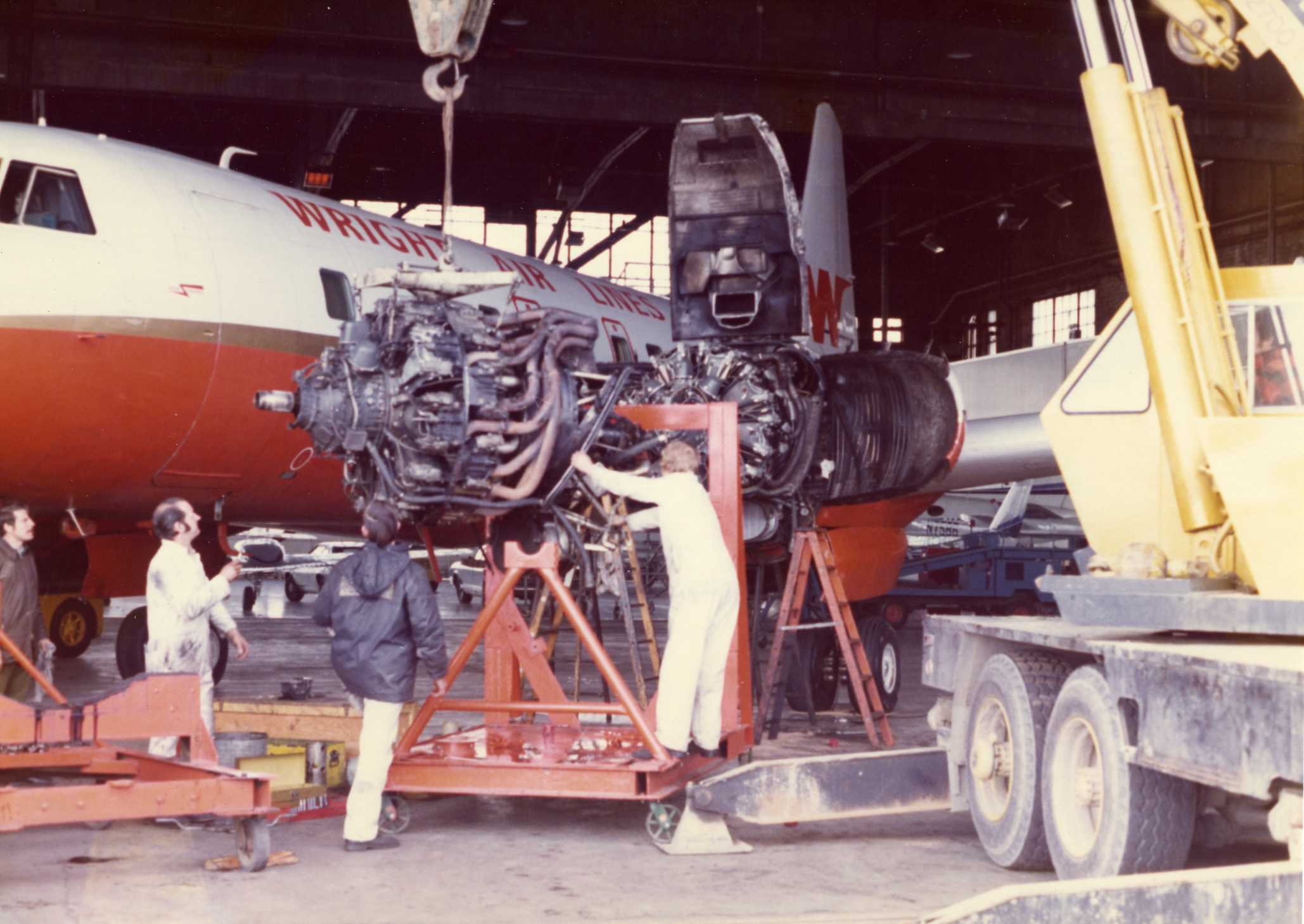
June 1975 Pratt & Whitney R-2800 piston engine swap on a Convair 440

While waiting for the CAB, Schneller sold off the Twin Otters and, oddly, bought a seat-belt plating company in Jackson, Michigan (Miller Plating Group) in December 1969. At the time of the proposed TAG merger in 1970, Schneller envisioned future Wright having three divisions: TAG as the CAB certificated subsidiary, Wright as the traditional small aircraft operation and the plating operation. By March 1971 the plating company was sold. Also in 1970, Wright entered into a contract with Eastern Air Lines to fly from Bowling Green, KY on Eastern's behalf. Eastern petitioned the CAB to withdraw completely, while local politicians did everything they could to force Eastern itself back into Bowling Green. The lengthy CAB process ended September 1972, Eastern was gone and so was Wright. Meanwhile, the airline progressively pulled out of other routes than DET-BKL. By January 1971, they were down to BKL-DET plus the Eastern contract work. Under Schneller, Wright flew its first profitable month ever in April 1970. Weller had never achieved a profit. Schneller promised turboprop Fairchild FH-227 aircraft (a somewhat larger US-built version of the F-27) once CAB certification was achieved. But when that finally happened, Wright instead used piston-powered Convair 440s. At year-end 1974, all CAB carriers combined had 77 piston aircraft (33 of those in Alaska) out of 2,513 total aircraft, 264 of them turboprops. So, while Wright now flew bigger equipment, it was not yet modern. In the 12 months to April 30, 1971, 72,000 passengers flew DET-BKL. In 1974, CAB certificated Wright, now with "big" airplanes, flew only 62,000 on the same route – fewer than when small planes flew the route.

==== Don Scott Airport ====
In August 1975, the CAB approved Wright to fly to Columbus via Don Scott Airport, the airport owned by Ohio State University (OSU). The new service was not well received by the people living around the airport or OSU and they were able to force Wright out, the service lasting only from September 29 to December 15. Wright moved to Port Columbus International Airport – today's John Glenn International Airport. This is the only time the Ohio State airport has been used for scheduled airline service.

Wright Air Lines Financial Results, 1973 thru 1978
USD 000	1973	1974	1975	1976	1977	1978
Op revenue	1,722	2,084	1,957	2,446	3,031	5,304
Op profit (loss)	58	158	(200)	(55)	32	(72)
Net profit (loss)	(632)	33	(371)	64	(2)	(49)
Op margin	3.4%	7.6%	-10.2%	-2.2%	1.1%	-1.4%
Net margin	-36.7%	1.6%	-19.0%	2.6%	-0.1%	-0.9%

=== Singerman era ===
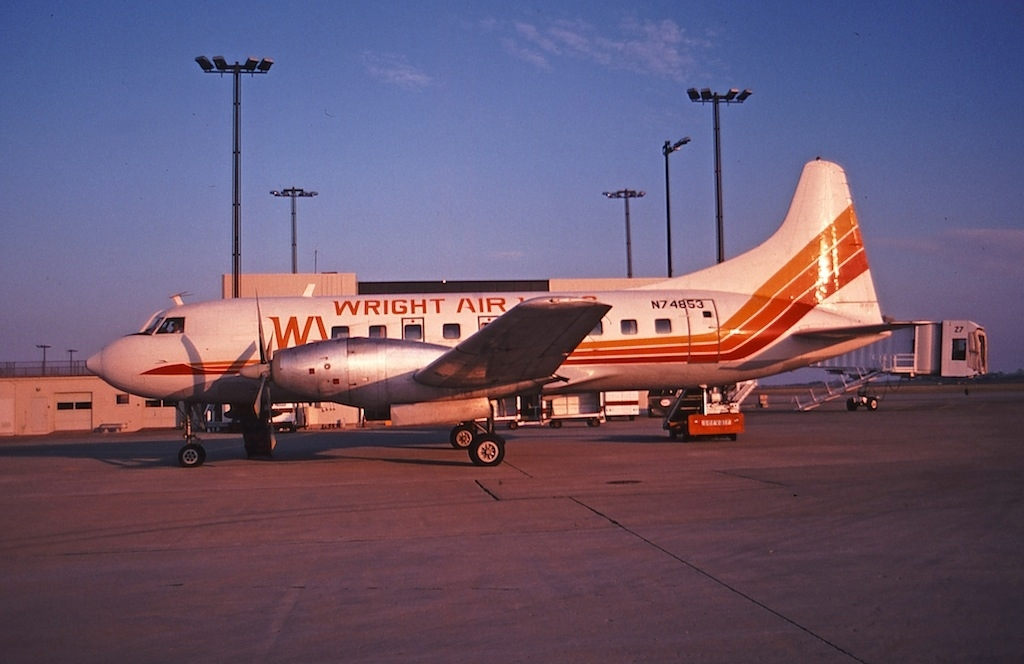
Convair 600 at Columbus November 1978

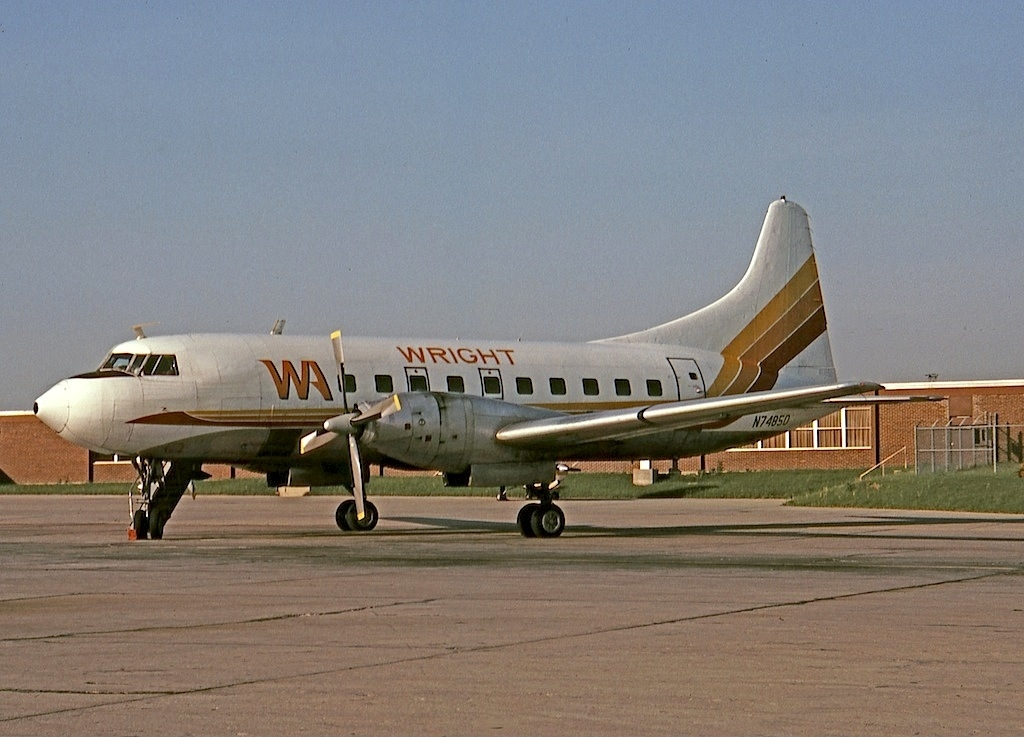
Convair 600 at Columbus November 1982

Gilbert “Gibby” Singerman was a partner in (and officer of) Midwest Air Charter, which pioneered the transport of cancelled checks by air in 1972 for the Federal Reserve (allowing the Fed to reduce the float in the money supply). (Federal Express originally sought the same business, hence the name.) Midwest moved its hub to Wilmington Air Park in 1978 and in 1980 was bought by Airborne Freight Company, becoming the air operations of Airborne Express. Midwest Air Charter is thus the origin of ABX Air, and the reason Amazon Air has an operation in Wilmington, OH today.

==== Merger, bankruptcy and fraud ====
Shorts 360 Detroit September 1984

In September 1981, Wright signed a tentative $10 million purchase of Air New England (ANE), coincidentally another rare small airline certificated by the CAB in the 1970s. ANE lived off CAB subsidy; it had never been an economic proposition. In the end, Wright walked away from ANE, with its owners doing the same, shutting Air New England on October 31, 1981. As an industry source noted, “Air New England didn’t have anything to sell.”

Two years later, however, on September 30, 1983, Wright merged with Aeromech Airlines, a West Virginia airline. The merger was quickly fatal. The first sign of trouble was a half-million dollar unpaid bill to the Cleveland airports, for which Singerman's excuse was that Wright lost track due to the merger. Wright had to reassure Clevelanders that, nonetheless, Wright was still flying from Cleveland. The merger wasn't the only thing distracting Singerman. For instance, he was involved with a new company, Advanced Turbo Manufacturing (ATM), that wanted to re-engine Convairliners (something that hadn't been done since the 1960s) in depressed Youngstown, Ohio. Singerman proposed to move Wright's headquarters to the same Youngstown location, no doubt to the eager anticipation of the staff. Despite Singerman's Convairliner passion, in April Wright ordered eight Shorts 360 aircraft, with the first to be delivered almost immediately.

In June 1984, Wright reported a huge $1.4mm loss on revenue of $7.3mm for the first quarter; the prior year had been break even. In August Wright announced a second quarter loss of $770,000 on revenues of $8.8mm. By September 28, Wright was in Chapter 11, after Shorts sued to repossess five newly delivered 360s on which Wright failed to pay rent. By November, Wright exited every route than Cleveland to Detroit (both DET-BKL and CLE-DTW, despite the presence of six other airlines on the latter). Singerman blamed the Aeromech system, but walked away from almost all of Wright's pre-merger system too. CLE-DTW duly got the ax in April 1985. In July, the bankruptcy court ruled Wright guilty of fraud and converted the case to Chapter 7 (liquidation). To finance the merger, Wright sold stock in February 1984 through notorious First Jersey Securities. The offering document said Wright would do one thing with the money and it was proved the company knew it would do something else. To his credit, Singerman got the case reverted to Chapter 11 by putting up his own money to allow the company to be sold and Wright stumbled on into the fourth quarter of 1985.

According to its February 1, 1982 system timetable, Wright was operating Convair 600 turboprop aircraft on all of its scheduled passenger flights and was serving Cleveland Burke Lakefront Airport, Cleveland Hopkins International Airport, Cincinnati, Columbus and Dayton in Ohio; Detroit City Airport and Detroit Metropolitan Airport in Michigan; and Louisville in Kentucky. Wright had expanded its route system by 1984 (see below) following the merger with Aeromech Airlines.

== Destinations in 1984 ==
According to its October 1, 1984 timetable, Wright served the following destinations:

- Albany, NY (ALB)
- Beckley, WV (BKW)
- Bluefield/Princeton, WV (BLF)
- Clarksburg/Fairmont, WV (CKB)
- Cincinnati, OH (CVG)
- Cleveland, OH (CLE) Focus city
- Cleveland, OH (BKL) Home base
- Columbus, OH (CMH)
- Dayton, OH (DAY)
- Detroit, MI (DET) – Detroit City Airport
- Detroit, MI (DTW) – Detroit Metropolitan Airport
- Elkins, WV (EVN)
- Greensboro/High Point, NC (GSO)
- Huntington/Ashland, WV (HTS)
- Louisville, KY (SDF)
- Morgantown, WV (MGW)
- Pittsburgh, PA (PIT) Hub
- Syracuse, NY (SYR)
- Washington, DC (DCA) – Washington National Airport

== Fleet ==
As of November 1966, the Wright fleet was three Beech E-18s, one Beech D-95 (Travel Air) and a Beech 33 (Debonair).

World Airline Fleets 1979 lists Wright as having six Convair 600s, registrations N74850 thru N74855.

The airline flew a wide range of aircraft types at various times during its existence which were selected according to the specific route and projected number of passengers on each route:

- Beechcraft 18
- Beechcraft 99A
- Cessna 402
- Convair 440
- Convair 600
- Convair 640
- de Havilland Heron
- DHC-6 Twin Otter
- Douglas DC-3
- Embraer Bandeirante
- Short 360

Wright acquired Bandeirantes when it purchased Aeromech October 1, 1983.

== Safety record ==
The airline had a good safety record with few accidents or incidents. None are known to have been fatal accidents.

== Similarly named but non-related airlines ==
- North-Wright Airways, a small commuter airline based in Canada.
- Wright Air Service, a small commuter airline based in Alaska.

== See also ==
- List of defunct airlines of the United States
