= List of de Havilland Heron operators =

There are few remaining flying examples of de Havilland Heron. The following are owners or former operators of the aircraft:

♠ Original operators

== Military operators ==
Belgian Congo

- Force Publique ♠

(Sri Lanka) Ceylon

- Royal Ceylon Air Force ♠
- Sri Lanka Air Force

Germany

- West German Air Force ♠

Ghana
Ghana Air Force

Iraq

- Royal Iraqi Air Force ♠

Jordan

- Jordan Arab Air Force ♠
- Royal Jordanian Air Force

(State of Katanga) Katanga

- Katangese Air Force

Kenya

- Directorate of Civil Aviation

Kuwait

- Kuwait Air Force

Malaysia

- Royal Malaysian Air Force ♠

Morocco

- Royal Moroccan Air Force purchased a single Heron on formation in 1956.

South Africa

- South African Air Force

United Kingdom

- Royal Air Force ♠
  - No. 60 Squadron RAF
  - Queen's Flight
- Fleet Air Arm
  - 781 Naval Air Squadron

== Civil operators ==
Australia

- Airlines of Tasmania this airline is not the present airline of the same name.
- Ansett-ANA
- Altair
- Amalgamated Air
- Associated Airlines ♠
- Butler Air Transport ♠
- Connellan Airways
- Coveair
- Kendell Airlines
- Northern Airlines
- Qantas
- Southern Airlines
- Southern Airways

Bahamas

- Bahamas Airways ♠

Bahrain

- Gulf Aviation

Belgium

- Sabena

Brazil

- TAS – Transportes Aéreos Salvador ♠

Canada

- Department of Transport
- Newfoundland Air Transport

Ivory Coast

- Air Ivoire

Colombia

- ACES Colombia

Denmark

- Cimber Air
- Dan-Fly
- Falcks Flyvetjeneste ♠

Fiji

- Air Pacific
- Fiji Airways

France

- Air Paris (airline)
- Union Aéromaritime de Transport ♠

Ghana

- Ghana Airways ♠

Honduras

- Aeroservice S de RL

India

- Indian Airlines♠

Indonesia

- Garuda Indonesia ♠

Italy

- Itavia
- Avio Linee Siciliane

Jamaica

- British West Indian Airways

Japan

- All Nippon Airways
- Fuji Airlines
- Japan Air Lines ♠
- Japan Air Services
- Toa Domestic Airline

Nigeria

- Nigeria Airways
- West African Airways Corporation (joint venture between Nigeria, Gambia, Sierra Leone, and Ghana) ♠

New Zealand

- Air North
- National Airways Corporation ♠

Norway

- Braathens SAFE ♠ : Eight aircraft from 1952 to 1960
- Fjellfly Air Services
- Nor-Fly : One aircraft on magnetometric surveys, 1966 - 02.01.1969, when ac ditched in Vestfjorden.
- VLS - Vestlandske Flyselskap ♠ : One aircraft on service Stavanger - Bergen - Trondheim, 1956 - 1957.

Oman

- Petroleum Development Oman

Portuguese Timor

- Transportes Aéreos de Timor

Puerto Rico

- Prinair

Rhodesia

- Air Trans Africa

São Tomé and Príncipe

- Transportes Aéreos São Tomé

Saint Lucia

- St. Lucia Airways

Sierra Leone

- Sierra Leone Airways

Spain

- Aviaco ♠

Sweden

- Västerås Flygande Museum : US-registered example operated by museum. (modified with boxer engines).

Thailand

- Sky of Siam

Tonga

- Tongair

Turkey

- Devlet Hava Yolları ♠
- Türk Hava Yolları

United Kingdom

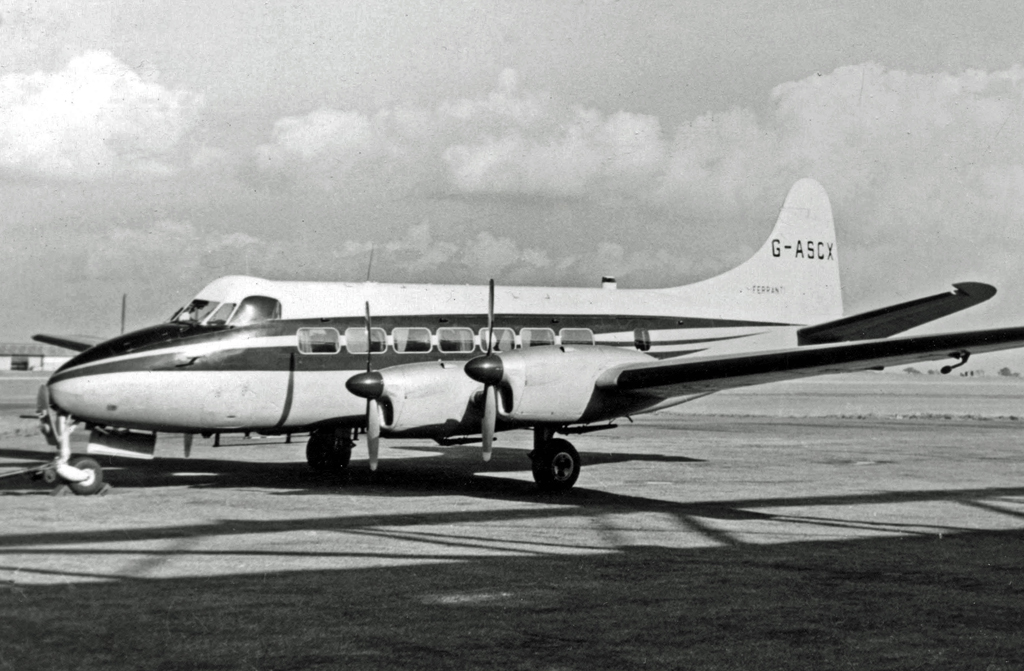
Heron 2D operated by Ferranti as an executive transport 1962-1970

- Air Ecosse
- British Airways
- British European Airways ♠
- British United Airways
- British Westpoint Airlines
- Cambrian Airways ♠
- Channel Airways
- Cunard Eagle Airways
- Dragon Airways ♠
- Fairflight
- Ferranti
- Jersey Airlines ♠
- Mercury Airlines
- Morton Air Services
- Peters Aviation
- Progressive Airways
- Silver City Airways

United States

- Air Idaho
- Air Pacific
- Albany Aero Club
- Allegheny Commuter (Fischer Brothers Aviation)
- Baja Cortez Airlines
- Colony Airlines
- Florida Airways
- Great Plains Airways
- Hawaiian Air Tour Service (HATS)
- Illini Airlines ♠
- King Airlines
- Monmouth Airlines
- Norstar
- North American Airlines
- Orange Blossom Commuter (AAT Airlines)
- Prinair
- Seagull Air
- Shawnee Airlines
- Swift Aire Lines
- Trans Magic Airlines
- Wright Airlines

Uruguay

- PLUNA ♠
