= Civil Aeronautics Board =

US federal airline regulator, 1939 to 1985

- Civil Aeronautics Board's official seal

Agency overview
- Formed: 1940 (86 years ago)
- Preceding agencies: Aeronautics Branch; Bureau of Air Commerce; Bureau of Air Mail; Air Safety Board (1940); Civil Aeronautics Authority
- Dissolved: 1985 (41 years ago)
- Superseding agencies: Federal Aviation Administration (1958); National Transportation Safety Board (1967); Secretary of Transportation
- Jurisdiction: Federal government of the United States
- Headquarters: Washington, D.C.
- Parent agency: Federal government of the United States

The Civil Aeronautics Board (CAB) was an independent agency of the federal government of the United States, formed in 1940 out of the prior Civil Aeronautics Authority (the Authority) and abolished in 1985, best known for tight economic regulation of the US airline industry through 1978. The CAB's regulatory powers originated in the 1938 Civil Aeronautics Act, which created the Authority and two other bodies. A 1940 amendment re-arranged 1938 Act duties, with economic regulation going to the CAB and most air safety/operational matters going to the Civil Aeronautics Administration (CAA), a significant exception being air accident investigation which went to the CAB. The 1958 Federal Aviation Act amended the 1938 Act, with some non-economic CAB functions split off. The 1966 Federal Transportation Act gave CAB's accident investigation duties to the newly-created National Transportation Safety Board (NTSB).

In 1977 the Air Cargo Deregulation Act substantially reduced the CAB's ability to regulate air freight. The Airline Deregulation Act of 1978 substantially reduced the CAB's passenger airline powers effective 1979, phasing out remaining powers until 1985 abolishment. Residual economic regulatory powers went mostly to the Department of Transportation, some to the US Postal Service. The period 1938–1978, when CAB/Authority economic power was at its height, is known as the regulated era of the US airline industry.

While the CAB is best known for economic regulation of airlines, its powers extended to related companies characterized as indirect air carriers, such as air freight forwarders, a significant industry of its own. Further, some airlines were able to escape most CAB regulation, while the CAB exempted still others from regulation. CAB regulations resulted in a complex system of many different types of airlines defined by different regulatory limits, as outlined below.

== Powers ==
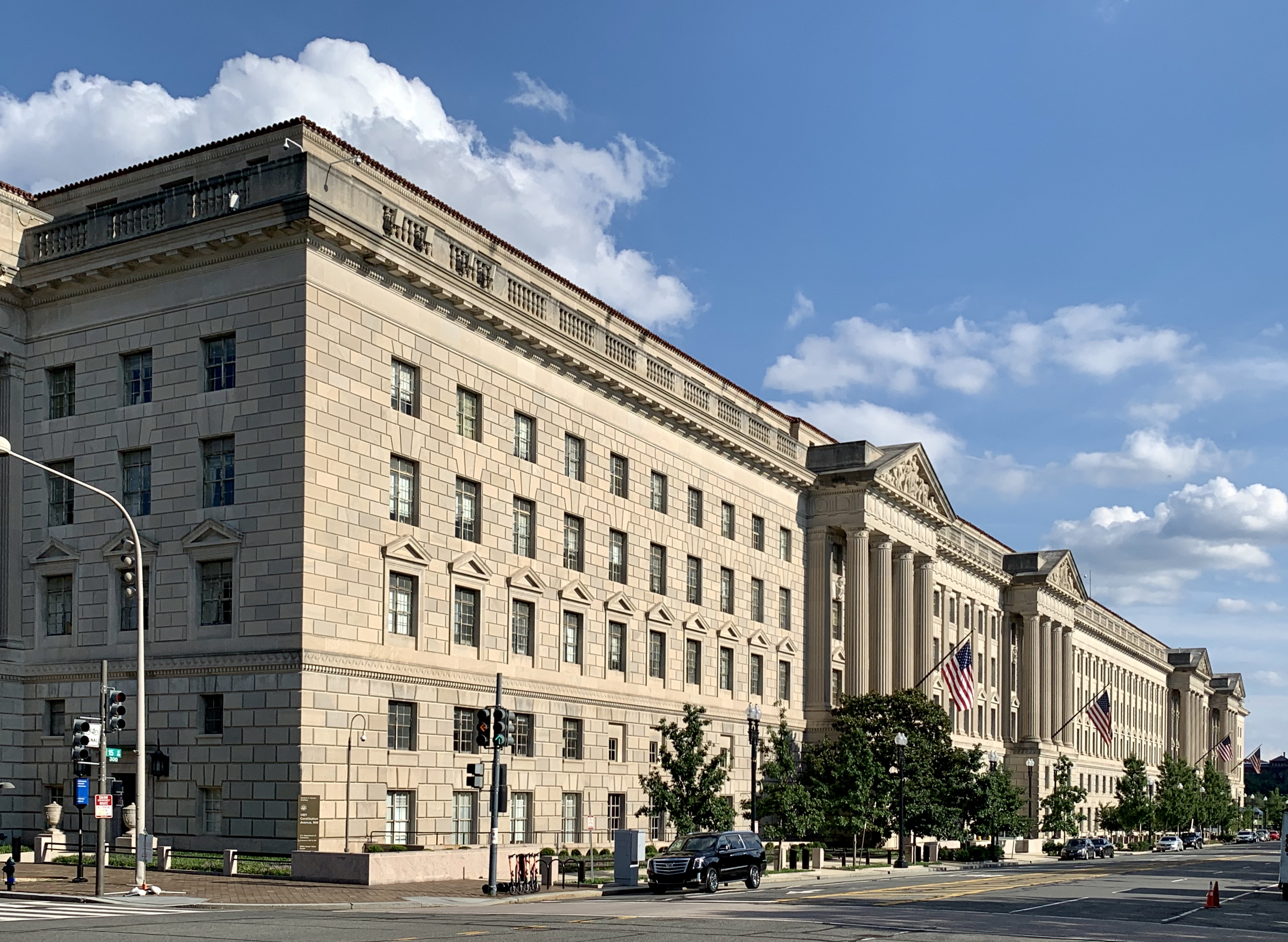
The Herbert C. Hoover Building, where the CAB was once headquartered

An image of an aircraft, representing aeronautical functions, at the Herbert C. Hoover Building, where the agency was initially headquartered. The building was (and is) home to the Department of Commerce, which regulated airlines prior to the 1938 Act

The authority of the Civil Aeronautics Board to regulate airlines was established by the Civil Aeronautics Act of 1938. The 1938 Act was amended by the Federal Aviation Act of 1958, but the main effect of that was to establish the Federal Aviation Agency (FAA), which among other things regulated (as it still does) airline operations and safety. The 1958 Act contributed the CAB's safety rule-making power to the FAA. The 1966 Department of Transportation Act, which established the US Department of Transportation (DOT), established the National Transportation Safety Board (NTSB) which absorbed the CAB's air accident investigation duties. Unlike the FAA, which (renamed as the Federal Aviation Administration) became part of DOT in the 1966 Act, the CAB remained an independent agency.

While CAB regulation suppressed free competition, it provided security for the existing airlines, avoided gluts and shortages of passengers on certain routes, and (partly by allowing airlines to carry air mail) secured airline service for communities that would have otherwise been served less, or not have been served at all (due to low passenger traffic or other reasons).

CAB authority included:

- Entry Companies could not enter the airline industry, either for domestic or foreign (between the US and foreign points) routes unless certificated by the Board. The Act stated: "No air carrier shall engage in any air transportation unless there is in force a certificate issued by the Board authorizing such air carrier to engage in such transportation." However, as described below, the Board also had the ability to provide exemptions from this and other Act requirements. The Board, when issuing a certificate, was required to determine a carrier was "fit, willing and able" to provide air transportation, that it would obey the Board and Act, and that the certificate issuance was required by "public necessity and convenience". Further, the Board had to specify for each certificate the end and intermediate points of all routes. Thus the CAB not only determined entry into the industry, but also the specific routes a carrier served. It could also put limitations on that service. For instance, the CAB could approve a route from A to B to C but not allow the carrier to fly nonstop from A to C.
- Exit An airline could not leave a market without CAB approval.
- Fares The CAB had broad authority to set or limit fares. There was a fairly uniform national fare structure based on distance flown set by the CAB. In particular, carriers serving the same markets were held to the same fares, so competition on the basis of fares did not exist, other than in the final years of the CAB when it experimented with liberalization. Fares also tended to underprice short-haul markets and overprice longer-haul markets.
- Mergers The CAB had the authority to approve or disapprove mergers, not only between airlines, but between an airline and any other common carrier (e.g. a bus line or a railroad) or a company engaged in any other phase of aviation (like an aircraft manufacturer). Moreover "merger" was defined broadly, encompassing more general concepts of common control.
- Interlocking relationships Any interlocking relationship, such as common directors, between airlines, or between an airline and a common carrier, or a company in any other phase of aviation, required CAB approval.
- Inter-carrier agreement All agreements between carriers had to be filed with the CAB, which evaluated whether such agreements were in the public interest. If not, they were not approved. In 1970, the CAB reviewed over 1000 such agreements, many of a routine nature such as the cooperation of airlines at a particular airport. This could also work, on occasion, to shield airlines from anti-trust laws.
- Unfair competition and Misleading business practices. The Act authorized the Board to investigate and correct such behavior.
- Subsidy The Board was authorized to subsidize carriers. As shown below, in 1978 the CAB paid subsidies to a dozen carriers, including nine that flew jet equipment.
- Exemption The Board had broad authority to provide exemptions from provisions of the Act. For example, originally all US non-scheduled carriers were authorized this way, the Board simply exempting them from certification. As discussed below, in 1952, the CAB also simply carved out a blanket exemption for airlines flying "small" aircraft in scheduled service (thereby birthing the commuter airline business).

Airlines had no ability to make competitive decisions, absent CAB approval, on choice of route or fare charged on any particular route.

=== Not included ===
The Act also prevented the CAB from regulating certain things: frequency, equipment, accommodations and facilities. It was up to the carrier to determine what aircraft it flew and how often and what airport or ticket facilities it built/rented, and so forth. However, the CAB did generally require a minimum adequate service, e.g. often two flights/day, in a market.

=== Indirect air carriers ===
The 1938 and 1958 Acts defined an air carrier as "any citizen of the United States who undertakes, whether directly or indirectly [...] to engage in air transportation." The indirectly clause gave the CAB jurisdiction over indirect air carriers, which included such activity as freight forwarders and tour operators. In 1977 (the last year of regulated air freight), US air freight forwarders generated $1.6 billion in revenue, about $8 billion in 2026 terms. The two largest air freight forwarders that year were Emery Air Freight and Airborne Freight. By comparison, scheduled air freight revenue for the US air carriers in 1977 was $1.66 billion, against total 1977 US scheduled air carrier revenue of $19.8 billion. Air freight forwarders accounted for about 40-45% of total scheduled US carrier air freight demand.

== History ==
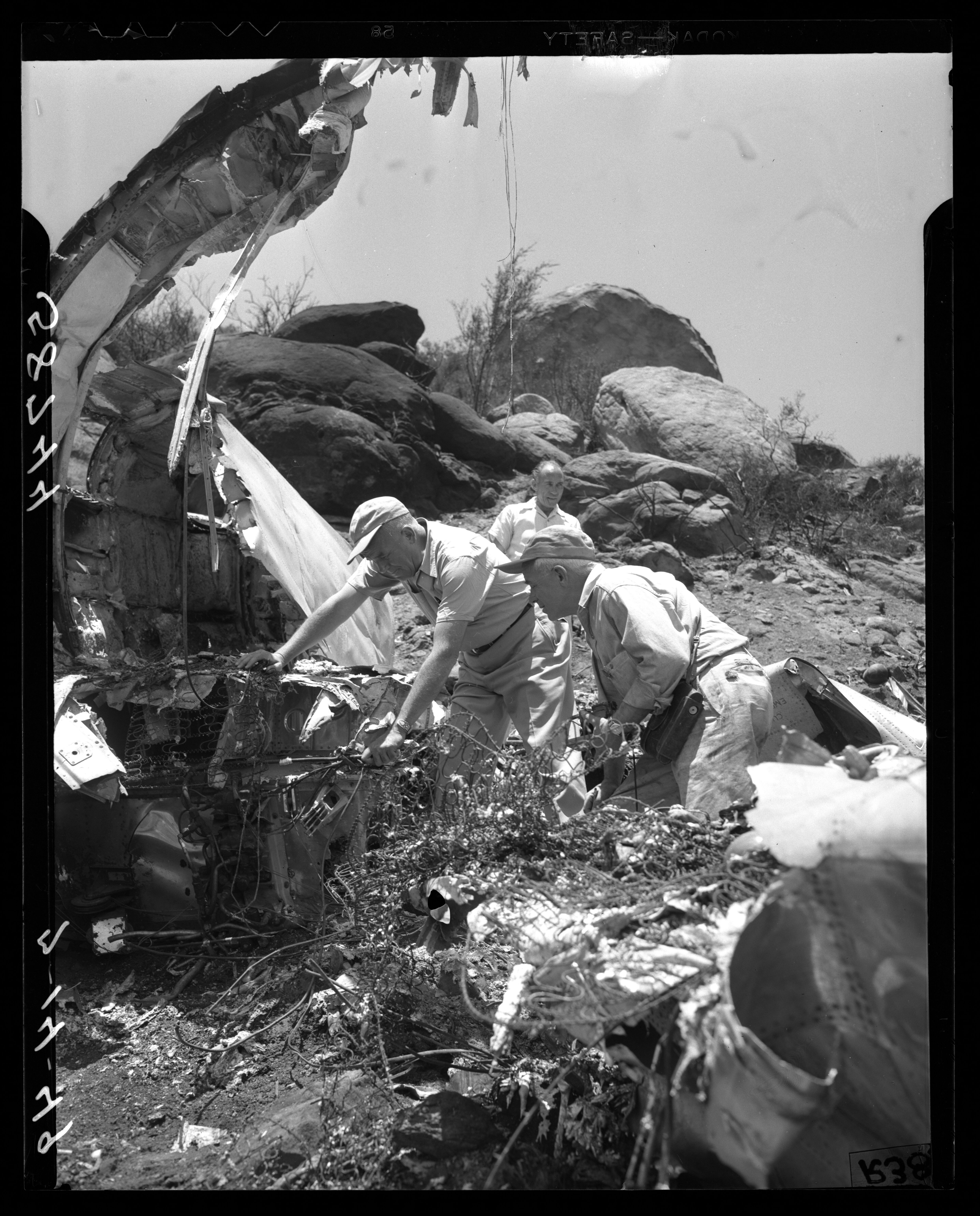
CAB investigators at site of Standard Air Lines Flight 897R accident, 13 July 1949

Prior to the 1938 Act, the airlines in the United States asked for regulation. There was, for instance, little air traffic control. That which existed was provided by the biggest airlines themselves; others saw obeying it as voluntary. There were significant high profile crashes that killed prominent people and brought air travel into disrepute. The industry was growing quickly, but still losing money. The airlines formed the Air Transport Association of America (today's Airlines for America) and one of its first activities was lobbying for government regulation. The 1938 Act created three positions/bodies: the Civil Aeronautics Authority, an Administrator of Aviation and an Air Safety Board. Due to overlap in jurisdiction, friction developed between the bodies. The 1940 Amendment to the Civil Aeronautics Act redistributed functions between two new bodies: CAB and CAA, with powers split between them as outlined in Powers above.

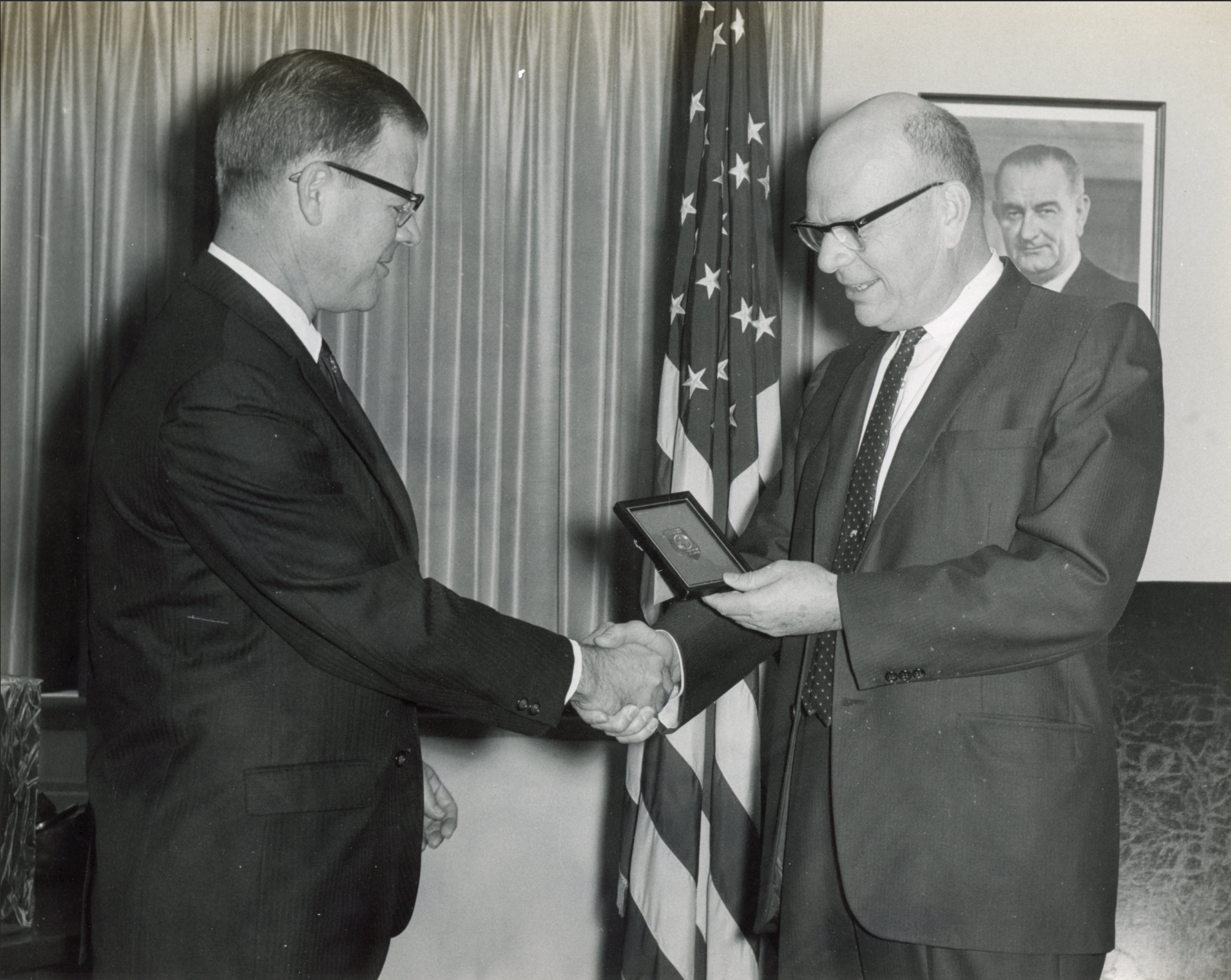
Charles S. Murphy (Right), Chair of the Board and Bobbie R. Allen, Director of the Bureau of Safety, circa 1966

The 1938 Act superseded the Watres Act, which had regulated commercial aviation since the mid-1920s. Other predecessor agencies included the Aeronautics Branch (1926–1934), the Bureau of Air Commerce (1934–1938), and the Bureau of Air Mail, Interstate Commerce Commission (1934–38).

The first major air accident investigation led by the CAB was the 1940 Lovettsville air disaster.

=== Deregulation ===
In 1975, Senator Ted Kennedy, in his capacity as Chair of the Subcommittee on Administrative Practice and Procedure of the U.S. Senate Committee on the Judiciary, assisted by Stephen Breyer, then a counsel to the judiciary committee (and later a Supreme Court Justice), held widely-reported hearings on the CAB. These hearings were later seen as the beginning of the process which ended in airline deregulation by the end of 1978. These publicized, among much else, the success that carriers like Southwest Airlines and Pacific Southwest Airlines had as intrastate airlines in Texas and California, despite the much lower fares they charged, and the degree to which the CAB acted primarily in the interests of the airlines, rather than consumers (the CAB chair until 1974, Robert D. Timm, prioritized ensuring scheduled airlines made a 12% return on investment and was caught accepting a Bermuda golf vacation from those airlines—Kennedy's subcommittee referred Timm to the Justice Department for possible prosecution.) Links to the transcripts of those hearings, the associated evidence and exhibits, and the report that Kennedy and Breyer wrote, are in External links below.

Also in 1975, President Ford appointed John E. Robson as CAB Chair. Under the chairmanship of John Robson, the Civil Aeronautics Board "in April 1976 did the unthinkable, becoming the first regulatory body to support deregulation," which President Gerald Ford first spurred in February 1975 with a proposal to abolish the CAB altogether. Robson was followed as CAB Chair by Cornell University professor Alfred E. Kahn, appointed by President Jimmy Carter. Kahn was a well-known specialist in regulatory economics, having written one of the standard texts and had previously been chairman of the New York Public Service Commission, the body regulating utilities in New York State. The CAB continued to be a focus of the early deregulation movement, and its dissolution was one of the most conspicuous pioneering events of that movement. Air freight was deregulated in the 1977 Air Cargo Deregulation Act, as this was seen as much less controversial. The Airline Deregulation Act of 1978 specified that the CAB would eventually be disestablished — the first federal regulatory regime, since the 1930s, to be totally dismantled — and this happened on January 1, 1985. The remaining tasks were transferred to the Secretary of Transportation except for a few going to the U.S. Postal Service.

== Airlines not regulated by the CAB ==
The CAB regulated almost all commercial air transportation in the US, but there were some exceptions.

=== Air taxis ===
The CAB chose not to regulate airlines flying "small aircraft". This was formalized in Part 298 of the Board's economic regulations, which in 1952 gave a blanket authorization for any airline operating an aircraft with a maximum gross takeoff weight of 12,500 lbs or less. Such airlines were originally known as "air taxis", later as commuter airlines or Part 298 carriers. Confusingly, "air taxi" was also the term by which the CAB referred to Aspen Airways and Wright Air Lines (after they became certificated carriers) within the CAB's taxonomy of certificated scheduled airlines (see "Airline categories" below). However, in 1972 the CAB expanded this category to include aircraft of 30 passengers or fewer, with a payload of less than 7,500 lbs. Such carriers did have to obtain Federal Aviation Administration operational/safety certification but were otherwise able to fly wherever they pleased.

The CAB would, on occasion, also exempt air-taxi or commuter operators to operate aircraft larger than the limits. For instance, in 1971, it exempted Executive Airlines and Air New England (at that time a commuter carrier) to fly propeller aircraft up to 44 seats to expand service in New England.

On five occasions, the CAB certificated former air taxi/commuter airlines to fly larger aircraft. These airlines were then regulated by the CAB like any other CAB carrier:

- Aspen Airways in 1967
- TAG Airlines in 1969
- Wright Air Lines in 1972
- Air New England in 1974
- Air Midwest in 1976

=== Intrastate airlines ===
An airline that restricted flying to within one state and took other steps to minimize participation in interstate commerce could avoid CAB regulation and fly as an intrastate airline. In the case of air taxis, the CAB chose not to regulate. In the case of intrastate airlines, it was legally unable to. Restriction of flying to a single state was not sufficient to avoid CAB regulation; the additional measures to avoid interstate commerce were critical. Furthermore, flying within a single state was generally interpreted strictly. An aircraft flying outside the boundaries of that one state could trigger CAB authority, including, in the case of Hawaii, flying overwater between the islands, which was upheld in court as being intrinsically interstate commerce because the Federal government had domain over the seas.

Note that the Federal government, while not providing economic regulation over intrastate carriers, did regulate them from an operational/safety standpoint. For those purposes intrastate airlines were regulated by the Federal Aviation Administration just like any other carrier.

=== Uncertificated carriers ===
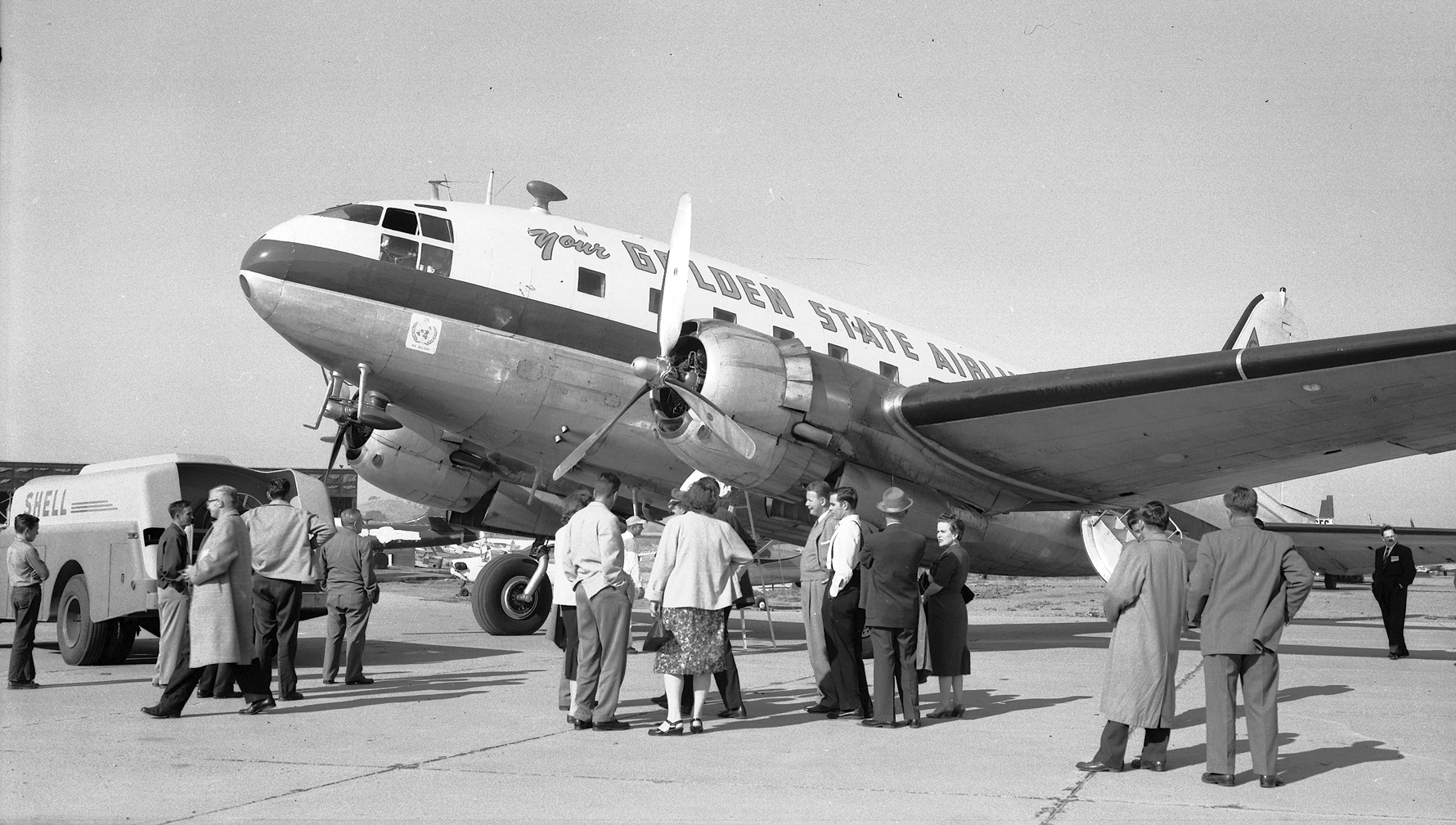
Part 45 carrier Golden State Airlines C-46 in 1958

Uncertificated carriers, known by a variety of names over time, such as contract carriers or Part 45 carriers, were airlines which escaped CAB regulation by not being common carriers - in other words, they did not hold themselves out to the public as a carrier. Zantop Air Transport was an example of such a company, flying aircraft on behalf of the US automakers on a private basis (before it acquired a supplemental certificate in 1962). "Part 45" was a reference to the then Civil Aviation Regulations under which the then Federal Aviation Agency regulated the operations/safety of such non-common carrier operators.

Over time, the Civil Aviation Regulations (subsequently the Federal Aviation Regulations) changed. Instead of Part 45, such uncertificated carriers were moved to being regulated under Part 42. They then became known as Part 42 carriers. Finally, the regulations were completely revamped, with most commercial operations moved to Part 121. Such operators were then known as Part 121 commercial operators or simply just commercial operators. A prominent example of such a carrier was Zantop International Airlines (ZIA), which started in 1972 as a Part 121 commercial operator, uncertificated by the CAB.

The CAB regularly enforced its powers against uncertificated carriers engaged in activities the CAB saw as making them common carriers. For instance, in February 1961, they issued a cease-and-desist order to, among others, Trans Global Airlines, Inc., aka Golden State Airlines, a Part 45 carrier, for carrying passengers to the Dunes Hotel in Las Vegas for "free". The fact that transportation was provided as part of the cost of accommodation did not make the airline any less a common carrier, and therefore guilty of providing interstate air transportation without a CAB certificate. The results of such investigations were not necessarily a foregone conclusion. In 1976, the CAB ended a long investigation by deciding ZIA was, in fact, not a common carrier (and thus did not require certification), going against the decision of its own administrative law judge. Ironically, this happened only a year before ZIA separately applied for and received certification as a supplemental air carrier.

=== Air travel clubs ===
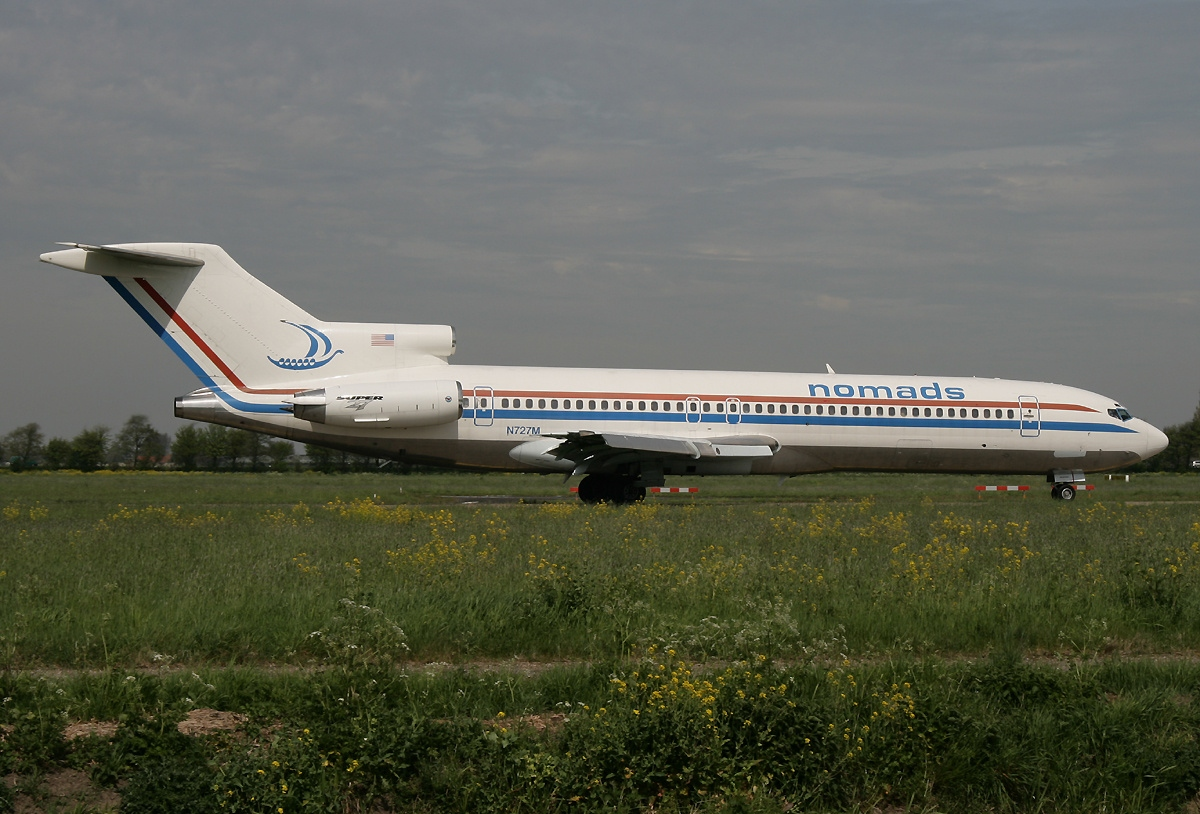
Nomads was one of the longest lasting air travel clubs, incorporated in 1965 and liquidated in 2011.

Air travel clubs were membership organizations, nominally private, that had their own aircraft and ran trips for members. In 1968, the FAA instituted Part 123 of the Federal Aviation Regulations under which air travel clubs had their own operational requirements. Starting in the early 1970s, the CAB went after some of the largest air travel clubs for being de-facto common carriers. In 1973, it shut down Voyager 1000, a large Indiana-based air travel club. Voyager, which had a fleet comprising a Boeing 720, two Lockheed Electras and some piston aircraft and its own terminal at Indianapolis Airport, unsuccessfully appealed to the federal courts. The chief pilot of Voyager was George Mikelsons, who left to found what later became ATA Airlines. The CAB went on to shut two other large clubs in 1974 (AirClub International, which also flew jets) and 1975. Notwithstanding these enforcement actions, in November 1979 (within the first year of deregulation) there were still 11 air travel clubs operationally regulated under Part 123, though by May 1980 it had dropped to seven.

== Airline categories ==
The CAB divided the airlines it regulated into categories according to the roles they were meant to play. The following draws from the CAB's FY 1977 Report to Congress dated May 1978, and so reflects the state of CAB airline certification just prior to deregulation.

=== Supplemental air carrier ===
Until 1978 the CAB referred to charter carriers as supplemental air carriers. Prior to 1955, the CAB called them irregular air carriers, and prior to 1946 they were known as nonscheduled air carriers or nonskeds. These airlines sprang into existence, over 150 of them, at the end of World War II, using a loophole that was meant to be used by small businesses, like fixed base operators, to offer occasional small-aircraft charters without needing to get CAB approval.

From 1964, these airlines were simply charter carriers, but until 1964 they also had limited but flexible ability to fly scheduled service, which explains why they were not simply called charter carriers. Most of them failed to survive the regulated era, as the table below shows, unlike the scheduled carriers, which generally had the support of the CAB. At times the supplementals operated on the edge of legality—the CAB spent much of the 1950s trying to shut down a number that blatantly violated CAB regulations and the law. Supplementals also played a substantial role in the development of the first freight airlines—all of the first scheduled US freight airlines (like Flying Tiger Lines) started as irregular or supplemental air carriers.

1978 CAB Supplemental Air Carriers, Revenues and Fleet(1) Out of business by year end(2) Service suspended(3) Listed by CAB as Airlines, but all other sources say Airways
Airline	Op revenue (USD mm)	Fleet (bold indicates jet type)
Capitol International Airways	87.0	**12 DC-8**
Evergreen International Airlines	40.9	**6 DC-8, 3 DC-9**, 4 Lockheed Electra, 7 CV-580
McCulloch International Airlines	1.2	^{(1)}
Modern Air Transport	^{(2)}	
Overseas National Airways	28.3	^{(1)}
Rich International Airlines^{(3)}	2.9	2 DC-6, 3 C-46
Southern Air Transport	N/A	2 Lockheed L-100-20, 1 Lockheed L-100-30
Trans International Airlines	231.2	**3 DC-10, 14 DC-8**, 11 Lockheed L-100-30, 9 Lockheed Electra
World Airways	126.6	**3 DC-10, 5 DC-8**
Zantop International Airlines	10.3	**5 DC-8**, 16 Lockheed Electra, 11 DC-6, 14 CV-640

=== International air carrier ===
Scheduled carriers were split between domestic and international. Two carriers were exclusively international: Air Micronesia (a subsidiary of Continental Airlines) and cargo carrier Seaboard. One carrier was almost exclusively international: Pan Am and, until deregulation, was not permitted to sell tickets for transport within the continental US. While it could fly aircraft from, say, New York to Los Angeles, it could not sell tickets between New York and Los Angeles despite having significant international operations in both cities. All other international carriers were also domestic carriers. There was a split within international between passenger airlines (which were always free to carry cargo and sometimes flew pure cargo aircraft) and cargo airlines.

=== Trunk carrier ===
Domestic had many subcategories. The original CAB scheduled carriers were known as trunkline carriers, trunklines, trunk airlines or simply just trunks, with most (but not all) such carriers having certificates dating back to 1938, the date of the Civil Aeronautics Authority Act that created the CAB. These were carriers such as United Air Lines, American, TWA, etc., all with origins going back to the 1920s and 1930s. For a summary, see the table below.

=== Local service carrier ===
After World War II, the CAB certificated a second set of scheduled carriers, the local service carriers. In theory, local service airlines served smaller routes than the trunklines, though most trunklines tended to have some legacy points on their networks that were quite small. Over time, the CAB allowed local service carriers to compete on some routes with trunklines and some local service carriers became sizeable airlines. However, as shown in the table below, in 1978, just prior to deregulation, the largest local service carrier Allegheny (soon to rename itself USAir) was still smaller in revenue terms than the smallest trunk, National, and basic operating statistics show the local service carriers as flying distinctly less capacity, smaller aircraft and shorter routes than the trunks.

Local service carriers were also the biggest recipients of CAB subsidies, as shown below. In 1978, the CAB paid a total of $66.3 million in subsidies to airlines (over $275 million in 2024 dollars) of which $58.5 million was paid to local service carriers, equivalent to over 40% of local service carrier operating profits that year.

=== Other domestic certificate categories ===
Other CAB domestic categories included Alaska, Hawaiian, helicopter, regional, air taxi, and cargo. Historically there was a territorial category, superseded by Hawaiian and Intra-Alaskan after Hawaii and Alaska became states. Some carriers had more than one domestic status. For instance, Alaska Airlines was listed as both an Alaska carrier and a trunk; however, for the purposes of 1978 CAB statistics it was counted as an Alaska carrier.

=== 1978 CAB scheduled carriers ===
The wide variety of carriers in the table below hints at problems with just one facet of CAB regulation. Tiny Alaskan back-country carriers like Munz Northern and Kodiak-Western were subject to the same kind of proceedings as huge airlines like United and American. 1975 certification proceedings for Munz Northern were memorialized in 32 pages of CAB reports, encompassing the deliberations of the (usually five but in this case four) member CAB board itself, plus the earlier deliberations of an administrative law judge in front of whom six people appeared, representing Munz and two other interested parties. At the time, Munz had six aircraft, each carrying 10 people or fewer. Further, Munz then had the same reporting requirement as carriers like United, all the usual reams of data that had to be sent to the CAB, for a carrier a tiny fraction of the size.

1978 CAB Scheduled Air Carriers, Certificate Types & Dates, Revenues, Subsidies, Select Statistics & Fleet(1) Airline name per CAB in 1978(2) Earliest awarded certificate. Each attribute had a separate certification date(3) USD mm(4) USD mm, included within operating revenue(5) Available Seat Miles, an ASM is one seat available for sale flown one mile(6) Average seats per flight weighted by miles flown(7) Average flight distance(8) Included in Continental revenue(9) Rounds to 0.00 in billions(10) CAB shows no intl certificate, but Airlift had 1978 intl revenue, and "intl" is in the name
Airline^{(1)}	Certificate type	Certificate year^{(2)}	Op rev^{(3)}	Subsidy^{(4)}	Sched ASMs (bn)^{(5)}	Avg Seats/ Mile^{(6)}	Stage length (mi)^{(7)}	Fleet (bold text indicates jet)
American Airlines	trunk/intl	1938	2,736.4		45.49	154.2	799.8	**8 B747, 31 DC-10, 67 B707, 145 727**; freighters **3 B747, 8 B707**
Braniff Airways	trunk/intl	1938	966.5		17.84	138.5	583.1	**3 B747, 14 DC-8, 93 B727**
Continental Air Lines	trunk/intl	1938	772.0		14.53	155.2	618.5	**15 DC-10, 51 B727**
Delta Air Lines	trunk/intl	1938	2,241.6		37.55	151.5	457.9	**22 L-1011, 23 DC-8, 110 B727, 52 DC-9**
Eastern Air Lines	trunk/intl	1938	2,379.6		39.06	135.5	509.1	**34 L-1011, 5 A300, 127 B727, 75 DC-9**
National Airlines	trunk/intl	1938	636.4		13.83	174.1	694.5	**15 DC-10, 38 B727**
Northwest Airlines	trunk/intl	1938	794.4		14.30	226.2	667.2	**15 B747, 22 DC-10, 62 B727**; freighters **4 B747**
Pan American World Airways	intl/trunk/AK/HI	1938	2,281.8		34.42	299.0	1,509.2	**38 B747, 38 B707, 15 B727**; freighters **5 B747**
Trans World Airlines	trunk/intl	1938	2,474.7		42.65	165.0	897.1	**11 B747, 28 L-1011, 94 B707, 80 B727, 14 DC-9**
United Air Lines	trunk/intl	1938	3,523.4		61.94	161.2	694.8	**18 B747, 42 DC-10, 56 DC-8, 125 B727, 59 B737**; freighters **14 DC-8**
Western Air Lines	trunk/intl	1938	834.5		15.76	147.9	645.6	**9 DC-10, 12 B707, 62 B727**
Air Micronesia	intl	1971	^{(8)}					
Allegheny Airlines	local svc/intl	1949	566.8		6.72	90.4	242.5	**10 B727, 45 DC-9, 30 BAC 1-11**
Frontier Airlines	local svc/intl	1946	287.2	12.2	3.77	81.6	230.2	**2 B727, 35 B737**, 27 CV-580
Hughes Air Corp dba Hughes Airwest	local svc/intl	1968	313.2	7.6	4.18	94.6	282.0	**9 B727, 40 DC-9**, 6 F-27
North Central Airlines	local svc/intl	1947	298.5	12.0	3.09	90.0	147.6	**34 DC-9**, 24 CV-580
Ozark Air Lines	local svc	1950	229.7	10.0	2.70	87.3	195.9	**32 DC-9**, 13 FH-227
Piedmont Airlines	local svc	1947	205.6	9.3	2.62	85.7	180.7	**6 B727, 27 B737**, 19 NAMC YS-11
Southern Airways	local svc/intl	1948	188.5	4.3	2.45	76.0	206.5	**30 DC-9**, 8 Swearingen Metro
Texas International Airlines	local svc/intl	1946	181.7	3.1	2.60	90.8	304.5	**26 DC-9**, 3 CV-600
Alaska Airlines	Alaska/trunk	1942	83.5	0.3	1.19	105.9	566.5	**11 B727**
Kodiak-Western Alaska Airlines	Alaska	1960	1.7	0.4	^{(9)}	3.0	38.3	12 assorted piston-powered aircraft
Munz Northern Airlines	Alaska	1976	2.9		^{(9)}	9.0	76.8	17 small piston-powered aircraft
Reeve Aleutian Airways	Alaska	1948	13.2		0.08	49.1	420.0	3 Lockheed Electra, 2 NAMC YS-11, 2 C-46
Wien Air Alaska	Alaska	1942	63.7	1.8	0.43	51.8	151.5	**7 B737**, 2 FH-227, 1 F-27, 1 Grumman Mallard
Aloha Airlines	Hawaiian	1949	60.7		0.56	119.5	119.2	**10 B737**
Hawaiian Airlines	Hawaiian	1938	89.9		0.72	136.6	119.8	**12 DC-9**, 5 Lockheed Electra; 1 Shorts 330
Air Midwest	regional	1976	5.3	1.5	0.04	16.9	115.8	5 Swearingen Metro, 1 Cessna 206
Air New England	regional	1975	20.8	3.8	0.13	29.9	82.3	8 FH-227, 10 DHC-6 Twin Otter
Aspen	air taxi	1967	7.8		0.05	46.7	116.8	10 CV-580
Wright	air taxi	1972	4.9		^{(9)}	40.5	100.3	6 CV-600
New York Airways	helicopter	1952	8.2		0.01	25.0	12.6	3 Sikorsky S-61L
Airlift International^{(10)}	domestic cargo	1956	84.3				924.0	**8 DC-8, 1 B727**
Flying Tiger	domestic/intl cargo	1949	404.2				1,377.0	**6 B747, 19 DC-8**
Seaboard	intl cargo	1955	118.6				2,658.9	**3 B747, 2 DC-10, 5 DC-8**

== Offices ==
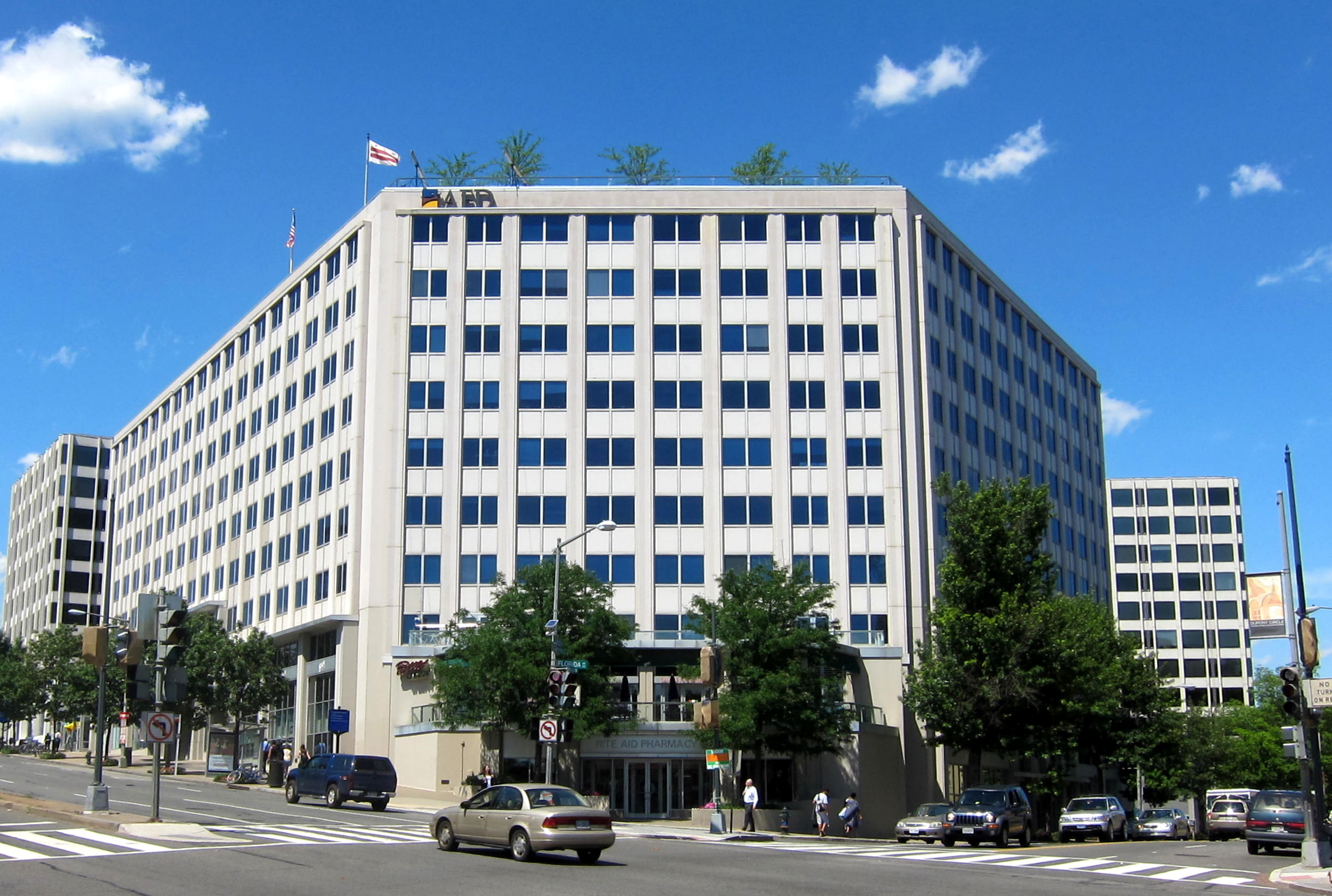
The Universal South Building at 1825 Connecticut Avenue NW. once housed the CAB headquarters.

The agency had its headquarters in the Universal Building in Dupont Circle, Washington, D.C. The agency had moved there by May 1959. Previously it had been headquartered in the Commerce Building (a.k.a. the Herbert C. Hoover Building), and its offices were in several buildings. After moving into the Universal Building, CAB leased space there. By 1968 the agency had acquired an additional approximately 2,000 square feet (190 m^{2}) of space in the same building, resulting in additional rent expenses.

== See also ==
- United States government role in civil aviation
