= Lonesome Pine Airport =

- IATA: LNP; ICAO: KLNP; FAA LID: LNP

Summary
- Airport type: Public
- Operator: The Cumberland Airport Commission
- Location: Wise, Virginia
- Elevation AMSL: 2,684 ft / 818.1 m
- Coordinates: 36°59′15″N 082°31′48″W
- Interactive map of Lonesome Pine Airport

Runways
Direction	Length		Surface
Direction	ft	m	Surface
6/24	5,280	1,609	Asphalt (grooved)

Lonesome Pine Airport (IATA: LNP, ICAO: KLNP, FAA LID: LNP) is a public airport located three miles (5 km) northeast of the central business district (CBD) of Wise, a town in Wise County, Virginia, United States. This general aviation airport covers 417 acres (169 ha) and has one runway. It was once served with commercial airline service on Appalachian Airlines. Lonesome Pine had hosted events such as "Wings over Wise' and most recently "Let Freedom Ring".
