= Mercer County Airport (West Virginia) =

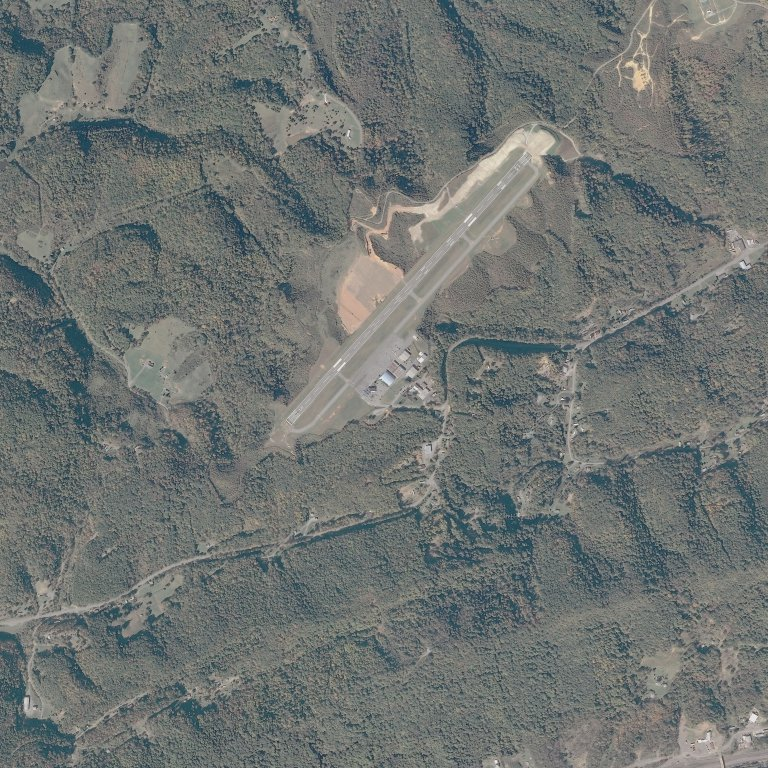
- USGS orthophoto
- IATA: BLF; ICAO: KBLF; FAA LID: BLF

Summary
- Airport type: Public
- Owner: Mercer County Airport Authority
- Serves: Bluefield / Princeton, West Virginia
- Location: 300 Markel Drive, #200, Bluefield, West Virginia, United States
- Elevation AMSL: 2,857 ft (871 m)
- Coordinates: 37°17′45″N 081°12′28″W

Map
- Location within West Virginia

Runways
Direction	Length		Surface
Direction	ft	m	Surface
5/23	4,743	1,446	Asphalt

Statistics (2023)
- Aircraft operations (year ending 7/11/2023): 16,400
- Based aircraft: 21
- Source: Federal Aviation Administration

Mercer County Airport (IATA: BLF, ICAO: KBLF, FAA LID: BLF) is in Mercer County, three miles northeast of Bluefield, West Virginia and about nine miles southwest of Princeton, West Virginia. The National Plan of Integrated Airport Systems for 2011–2015 categorized it as a general aviation facility.

The airport has been served by scheduled airlines. Service was subsidized by the Essential Air Service program until August 1, 2006, when it ended due to federal law not allowing a subsidy over $200 per passenger for communities within 210 miles of a large or medium hub airport (Charlotte/Douglas International Airport in North Carolina being 173 miles away). Federal Aviation Administration records say Mercer County Airport had 2,041 passenger boardings (enplanements) in calendar year 2004, 1,885 enplanments in 2005, 1,833 in 2006 and 1,721 in 2007. Scheduled passenger flights ended in 2007.

== Facilities ==
Mercer County Airport covers 511 acres (207 ha) at an elevation of 2,857 feet (871 m). Its one runway, 5/23, is 4,743 by 100 feet (1,446 x 30 m) asphalt.

In the year ending July 11, 2023, the airport had 16,400 aircraft operations, average 45 per day: 88% general aviation, 11% air taxi, and <1% military. 21 aircraft were then based at this airport: 15 single-engine, 5 helicopter, and 1 ultralight.

== Former airlines ==
- Piedmont Airlines 1953–54 to 1980 (the airport opened about 1953)
- Appalachian Airlines (ended operations in 1980)
- Colgan Air (ended operations November 12, 2007)
- Aeromech Airlines (service during the early 1980s)

== Accidents at BLF ==
- On April 12, 1961, a Douglas DC-3 operated by US Steel Corp. was damaged beyond repair in a runway excursion and went over an embankment. There were no fatalities or injuries.
- On January 21, 1981, a Cessna Citation I operated by Georgia-Pacific Corp. crashed after an attempted go-around on a slushy runway, overran the runway, struck three localizer antennas and a 10-foot embankment before plunging into a steep wooded hillside. All five occupants were killed.

== See also ==
- List of airports in West Virginia

== Other sources ==
- Essential Air Service documents (Docket OST-1997-2761) from the U.S. Department of Transportation:
  - Order 2002-4-25 (May 2, 2002): tentatively reselects Colgan Air, Inc. d/b/a US Airways Express, to provide essential air services at Beckley and Bluefield/Princeton, West Virginia, for the two-year period beginning August 1, 2002, at an annual subsidy rate to $2,067,693,
  - Order 2002-10-34 (October 31, 2002): finalizes the tentative findings and conclusions set forth in Order 2002–4–25.
  - Order 2004-6-14 (June 23, 2004): selects Colgan Air, Inc., d/b/a US Airways Express, to continue providing essential air service at Beckley and Bluefield/Princeton, West Virginia, for the two-year period beginning August 1, 2004, at an annual subsidy of $20,017,064.
  - Order 2006-6-22 (June 26, 2006): terminating the essential air service subsidy eligibility of Bluefield/Princeton, West Virginia, as of August 1, 2006, and allowing Colgan Air, Inc., d/b/a US Airways Express, to suspend service there as of the same date, if it chooses (subsidy per passenger already exceeded the statutory ceiling of $200 per passenger and the community is located 173 miles from Charlotte, the nearest large or medium hub).
