= Appalachian Airlines =

IATA	ICAO	Call sign
—	APL	—
- Founded: 1977; 48 years ago
- Ceased operations: 1980; 45 years ago
- Key people: F. King Roberts, President

Appalachian Airlines was a US commuter airline that operated out of northeast Tennessee. It was founded in 1977 as Appalachian Flying Service, and ceased its operations in 1980. At one time, the airline operated a fleet of seven Piper Navajo aircraft on its routes and also offered same-day parcel delivery service.

== Destinations ==
Appalachian Airlines offered scheduled flights to the following destinations:

- Beckley, West Virginia - Beckley Raleigh County Memorial Airport
- Bluefield, West Virginia - Mercer County Airport (West Virginia)
- Charleston, West Virginia - Yeager Airport
- Elkins, West Virginia - Elkins-Randolph County Airport
- Tri-Cities, Tennessee - Tri-Cities Regional Airport
- Roanoke, Virginia - Roanoke Regional Airport
- Wise, Virginia - Lonesome Pine Airport

== See also ==
- List of defunct airlines of the United States
