= TAG Airlines =

Flew between Detroit & Cleveland (1957–1970)

- Founded: 15 April 1955; 71 years ago (as Taxi Air Group)
- Ceased operations: 7 August 1970; 55 years ago
- Fleet size: see Fleet
- Destinations: see Destinations
- Parent company: Miller Oil (1957–1968)
- Headquarters: Detroit City Airport
- Key people: Ross Miller

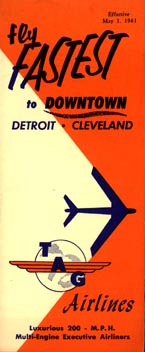

TAG Airlines was a small airline primarily serving the route from Burke Lakefront Airport in Cleveland, Ohio to Detroit City Airport, Detroit, Michigan with small aircraft. TAG achieved Civil Aeronautics Board (CAB) airline certification in October 1969 in order to fly larger aircraft on the route, only to suffer a fatal crash in January 1970 and cease operations later that year. TAG's CAB certification for the Burke Lakefront Airport to Detroit City Airport route was picked up by competitor Wright Air Lines in 1972.

== History ==
TAG was founded by William Knight in Cleveland, Ohio as Taxi Air Group, Inc. on 15 April 1955, originally flying floatplanes from Cleveland to Toledo. TAG was then sold to Ross Miller in 1957 who shifted the flying to land-based aircraft. On 17 June 1958, TAG merged into Miller Oil, the oil company owned by Ross Miller and his wife. TAG thereafter operated as a division of Miller Oil until 1968 when it was spun off into a separate company, still controlled by Ross Miller, incorporated in Michigan.

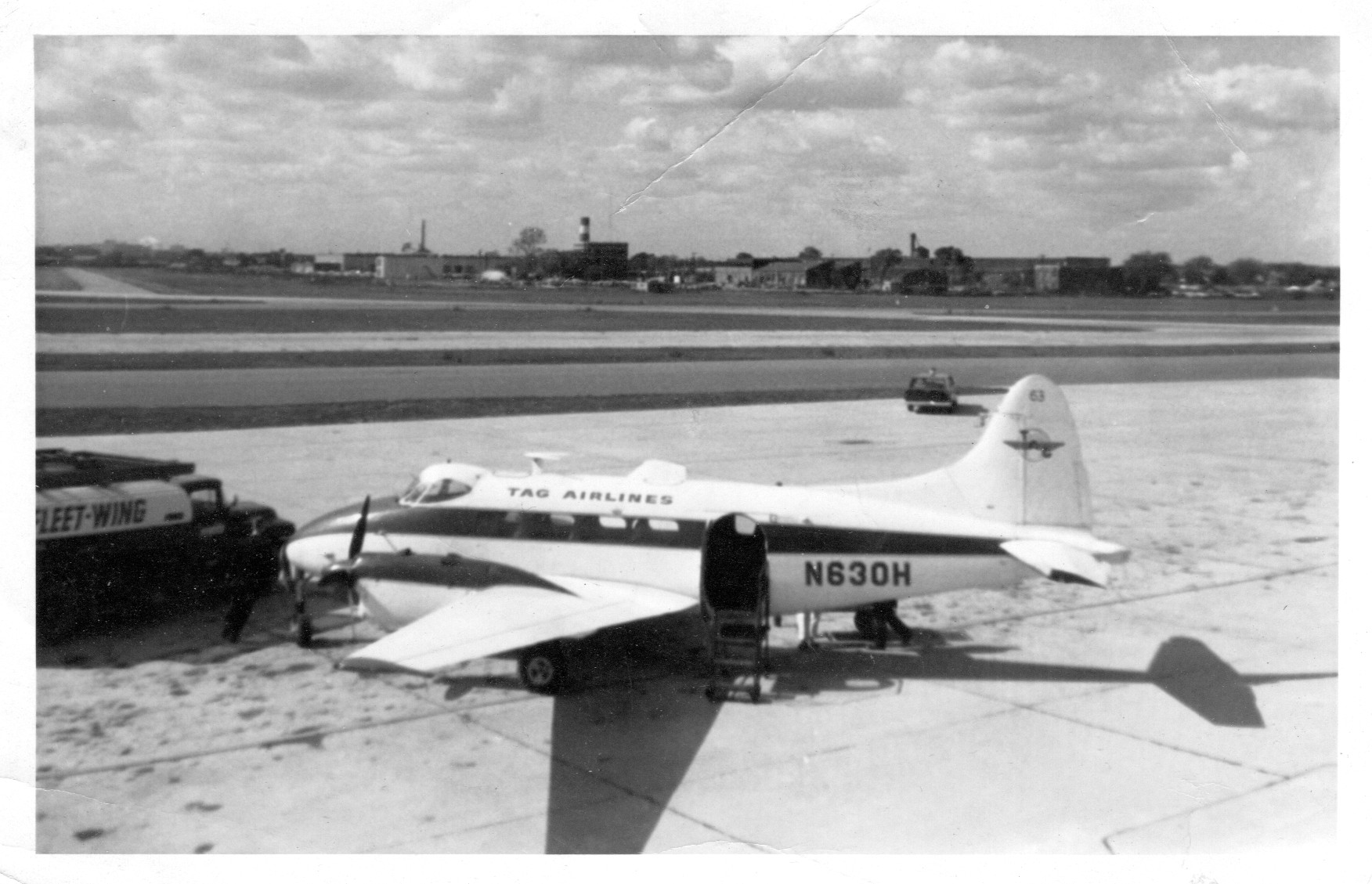
Dove at Detroit City Airport 1969

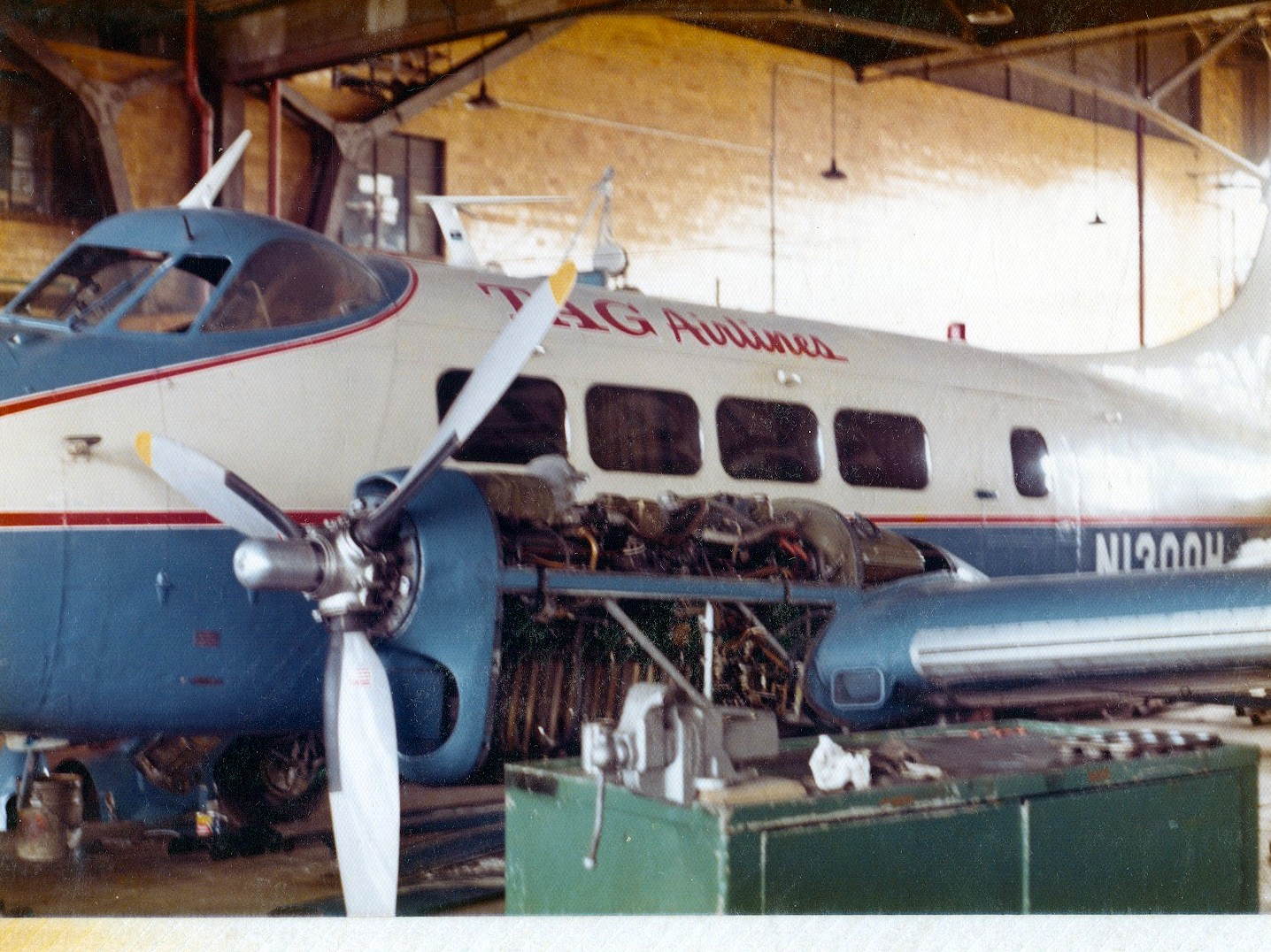
Dove in Detroit City Airport hangar

TAG's slogan was "The World's Busiest Airline". TAG was best known for its high frequency service from Burke Lakefront airport in Cleveland and Detroit City Airport. An October 1969 schedule showed 22 weekday flights per day each way, six on Saturday and ten on Sunday. The volume of passengers flown between these airports challenged the total passengers flown by trunk carriers and local service carrier between Cleveland Hopkins Airport and Detroit Metro Airport, despite the use by TAG of small de Havilland Dove aircraft (augmented by Piper Aztecs).

On October 28, 1969, the U.S. Civil Aeronautics Board (which at the time regulated all US airline service, other than "air taxi" operations with aircraft of less than 12,500lbs) awarded a certificate of public convenience and necessity to TAG to fly "large" aircraft between Burke and Detroit City Airport. In this case, TAG proposed acquiring two Fokker F27 turboprops, with a plan to later upgrade to Fokker F28 jets. In this, TAG was challenged by Wright Air Lines, which had been offering competing service on that route since 1966. Wright proposed using Convair 240 aircraft if it was awarded certification instead. The CAB preferred the idea of F27s. At the time, TAG's fleet comprised six Doves and four Aztecs.

On 28 January 1970, TAG Flight 730 from Cleveland to Detroit crashed into frozen Lake Erie killing all nine people aboard the Dove. The cause of the crash was found to be a fatigue crack in a fitting in the wing root resulting in failure of the right wing. Wright agreed to buy TAG for $3mm (about $20mm in 2024 dollars) in March. In July, not withstanding TAG's dire financial shape in the wake of the crash, the CAB rejected the merger, upon which TAG stopped operating on August 7. The response of the CAB was to direct TAG to resume operations within 90 days. When TAG was unable to do so, due to lack of funds, the CAB revoked its certificate. TAG did not fly again and in February 1972, Wright was awarded a certificate from the CAB to fly the route that TAG had been awarded in 1969.

== Fleet ==
As of the time of its certification:

- 6 de Havilland Dove
- 4 Piper Aztec

== Destinations ==
TAG timetables, and other sources as indicated, show the following destinations for TAG:

- Chicago, Illinois (Meigs Field)
- Cincinnati, Ohio (Lunken Airport)
- Cleveland, Ohio (Burke Lakefront Airport)
- Columbus, Ohio (Port Columbus Airport)
- Detroit, Michigan (Detroit City Airport) - headquarters
- Huntington, West Virginia (Tri Cities Airport)
- Pittsburgh, Pennsylvania (Allegheny County Airport)
- Akron, Ohio

== See also ==
- List of defunct airlines of the United States
