= Crown Airways =

Regional airline of the United States

IATA	ICAO	Call sign
—	—	ALLEGHENY
- Commenced operations: 1967; 59 years ago (Allegheny Commuter); 1969; 57 years ago (Crown Airways)
- Ceased operations: 1989; 37 years ago (Allegheny Commuter); 1994; 32 years ago (Crown Airways)
- Operating bases: DuBois Regional Airport (Crown Airways); Newark Liberty International Airport; Philadelphia International Airport
- Alliance: USAir Express
- Fleet size: 15 (Crown Airways)
- Headquarters: Washington Township, Jefferson County, Pennsylvania, United States (Crown Airways)

Crown Airways was a regional airline operating for USAir Express (Then US Airways Express) with its headquarters on the grounds of DuBois Regional Airport in Washington Township, Jefferson County, Pennsylvania, near Falls Creek. Allegheny Commuter was the brand name for the regional affiliate of Allegheny Airlines, under which a number of individually owned commuter air carriers operate short and medium haul routes. The airline is often credited as the first code-share agreement between a major airline and smaller commuters.

== History ==
Crown Airways started as feeder airline for Allegheny Commuter in March 1969. Allegheny Commuter was started in March 1967, when Henson Airlines began operating as a feeder carrier for Allegheny Airlines, predecessor to US Airways. The initial route was from Baltimore to Hagerstown. This is generally credited as the airline industry's first code-share agreement and the first major airline to use another airline as its commuter partner, At the time the idea was considered nothing short of revolutionary in the industry. Within the code-share agreement the smaller commuter airlines would take on routes that proved unprofitable for the larger airlines and paint their aircraft in the Allegheny Airlines livery, In turn Allegheny Airlines included the commuter airlines routes in their timetable and flight reservations systems as if they were mainline Allegheny flights, giving passengers the impression of completely integrated operations.

With this agreement Allegheny had a larger passenger base to fill their aircraft with while the feeder airlines saw huge growth in passenger numbers and revenue. Through the 1970's many other commuter airlines would join the Allegheny Commuter system providing feeder service from small communities for Allegheny Airlines. By the 1980s Allegheny Commuter was operating twelve French Nord 262 turboprops and three de Havilland Canada DHC-7 Dash 7 turboprops as well as a myriad of other aircraft. Allegheny Airlines changed its name to USAir in 1979 however the feeder network still carried the name of Allegheny Commuter until 1989 when it was changed to USAir Express.

After Allegheny Commuter became USAir Express, Crown Airways was taken over in a leveraged buyout in 1990 by two of its executives, Albert Beiga and Philip Burnaman. The carrier remained operating as USAir Express. Crown Airways ceased to exist in 1994 when it was purchased by Mesa Air Group.

== Destinations ==
Main Article: Allegheny Airlines § Allegheny Commuter

== Affiliate airlines ==
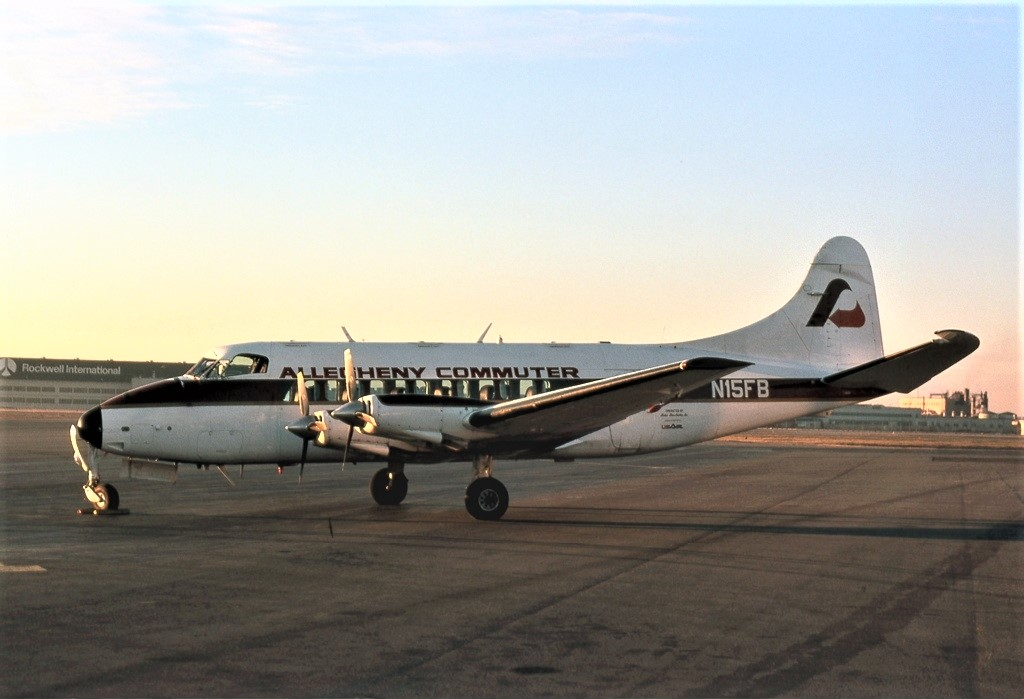
A De Havilland DH-114 Heron operated by Fischer Brothers Aviation

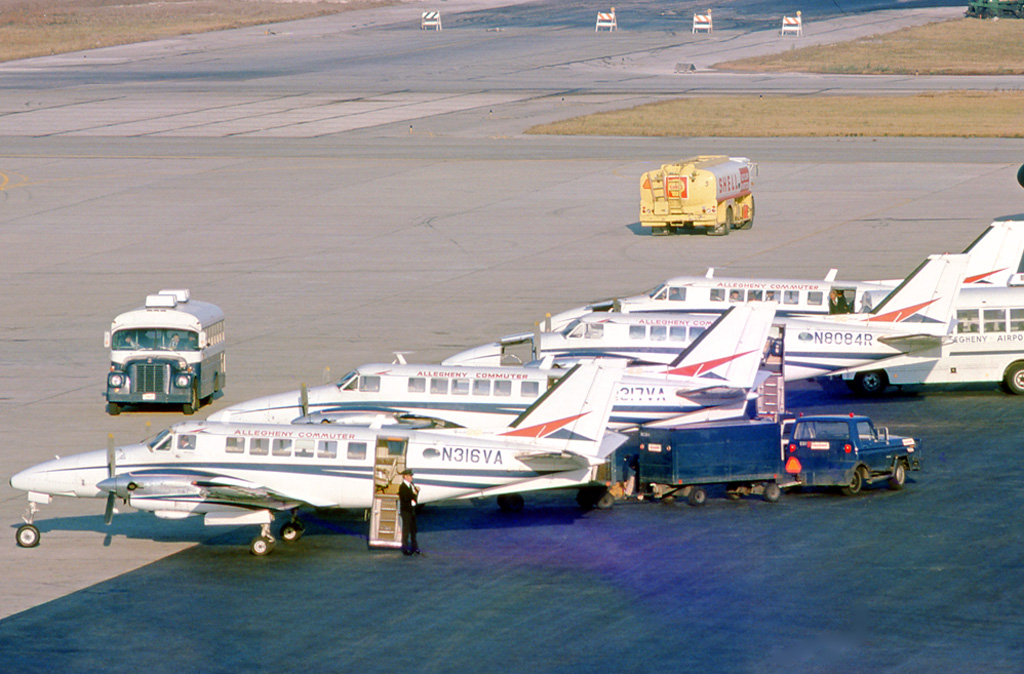
A line of Britt Air Beech 99 aircraft

Allegheny Commuter was operated by a myriad of smaller commuter airlines, these included:

- Aeromech Airlines
- Air Kentucky
- Air East
- Air North
- Britt Airways
- Crown Airways
- Chautauqua Airlines
- Fischer Brothers Aviation
- GCS Airlines
- Henson Airlines
- Pennsylvania Commuter Airlines
- Pocono Airlines
- Ransome Airlines
- Southern Jersey Airways
- Suburban Airlines
- The Hagerstown Commuter,
- Travel Air Aviation.

== Fleet ==
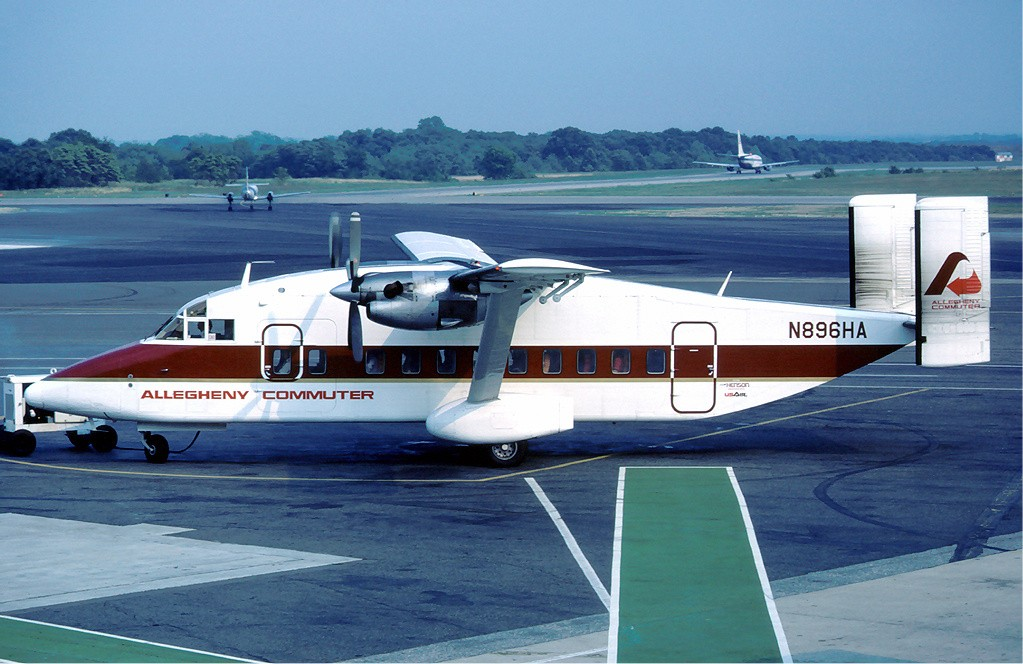
Short 330 of Henson Airlines in Allegheny Commuter livery.

- Nord 262
- Mohawk 298
- de Havilland Canada DHC-7 Dash 7
- de Havilland Canada DHC-6 Twin Otter
- Short 330
- Short 360
- Fokker F27 Friendship
- Fairchild Metroliner III
- Riley Turbo Skyliner
- Beechcraft B99
- Beech 1900C
- Volpar Turboliner
- CASA C-212
- Embraer EMB 110P2 Bandeirante
- Saab 340

== See also ==
- List of defunct airlines of the United States
