= Aeromech Airlines =

US airline

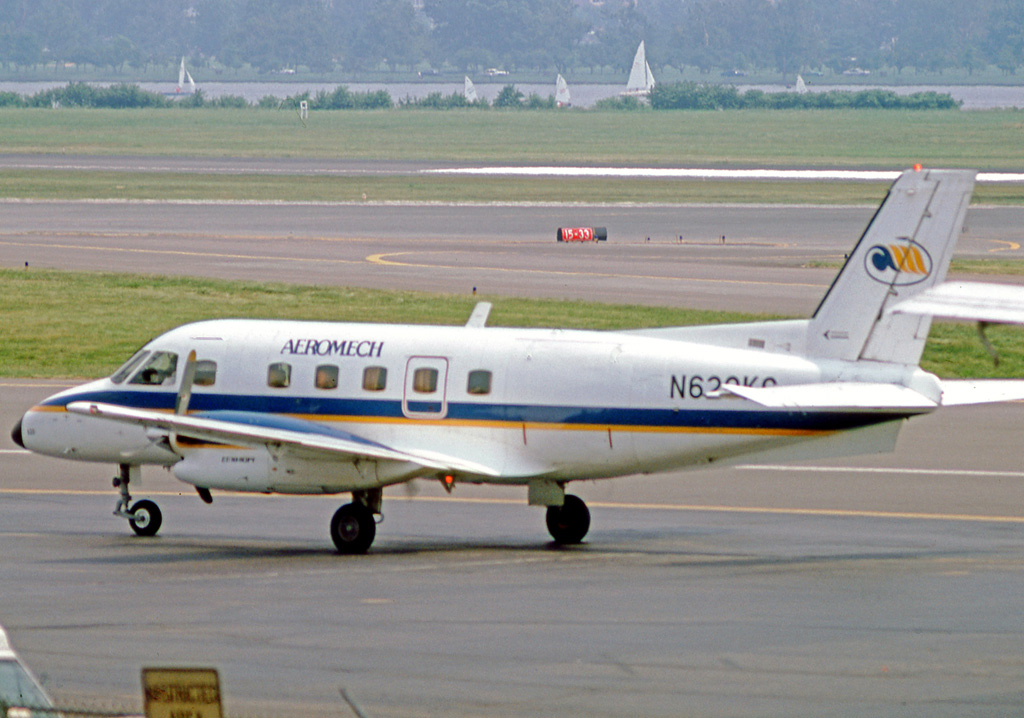
- Embraer Bandeirante of Aeromech operating a commuter service from Washington National Airport in June 1982.
IATA	ICAO	Call sign
KC	RZZ	AEROMECH
- Founded: 1951; 75 years ago
- Ceased operations: 1983; 43 years ago
- Operating bases: North Central West Virginia Airport
- Fleet size: 17

Aeromech Airlines was a small U.S. commuter air carrier founded in Clarksburg, West Virginia in 1951.

== History ==
Initially the company was an air taxi operation. By the late 1960's, the carrier began flying Beech 99 aircraft and began operating as Allegheny Commuter in association with Allegheny Airlines (later USAir). It changed its name to Aeromech in 1971 and later acquired de Havilland Canada DHC-6 Twin Otter aircraft. Embraer EMB 110 Bandeirante small twin-turboprop airliners were acquired by 1980 and these were operated on local commuter services, including those to Washington National Airport. The designation as Alleghany Commuter ended in 1981 at which time Aeromech returned to operating under their own branding.

Aeromech was merged into Wright Airlines in October 1983 and the Bandeirantes were then operated by Wright.

== Fleet ==
- Beech 99
- de Havilland Canada DHC-6 Twin Otter
- Embraer EMB 110 Bandeirante

== See also ==
- List of defunct airlines of the United States
