= North Central West Virginia Airport =

Airport in West Virginia, United States

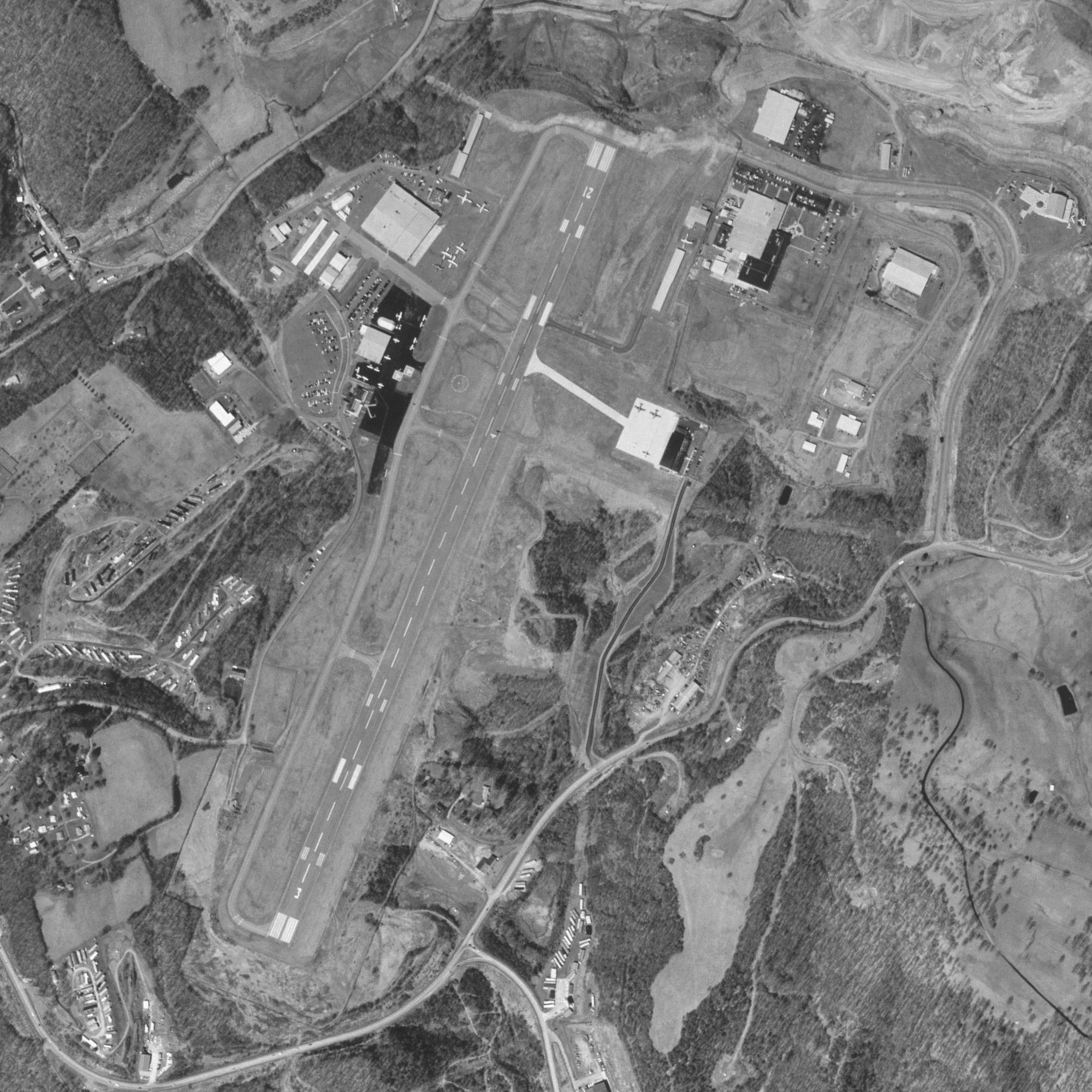
- USGS 1997 orthophoto
- IATA: CKB; ICAO: KCKB; FAA LID: CKB

Summary
- Airport type: Public
- Owner: Benedum Airport Authority
- Serves: Clarksburg / Fairmont, West Virginia
- Location: Bridgeport, West Virginia
- Elevation AMSL: 1,224 ft (373 m)
- Coordinates: 39°17′48″N 080°13′41″W
- Website: FlyCKB.com

Maps
- FAA airport diagram
- Interactive map of North Central West Virginia Airport

Runways
Direction	Length		Surface
Direction	ft	m	Surface
3/21	7,800	2,377	Asphalt

Helipads
Number	Length		Surface
Number	ft	m	Surface
H1	50	15	Concrete

Statistics (2021)
- Aircraft operations (year ending 9/30/2021): 33,792
- Based aircraft: 46
- Source: FAA and airport website

North Central West Virginia Airport (IATA: CKB, ICAO: KCKB, FAA LID: CKB) is a public/military airport a mile northeast of Bridgeport and six miles east of Clarksburg, in Harrison County, West Virginia, United States. It is owned and operated by the Benedum Airport Authority, serving Harrison and Marion County, and was formerly Benedum Airport and Harrison-Marion Regional Airport. The airport sees two airlines, with some passenger service subsidized by the Essential Air Service program.

Federal Aviation Administration records show the airport had over 41,067 passenger boardings (enplanements) in calendar year 2025, up from 10,694 in 2010. The National Plan of Integrated Airport Systems categorizes it as a primary commercial service airport (more than 10,000 enplanements per year).

== Facilities ==
The airport covers 434 acres (176 ha) at an elevation of 1,224 feet (373 m). Its single runway, 3/21, is 7,800 by 150 feet (2,377 x 46 m) long. It has one helipad, 50 by 50 feet (15 x 15 m).

Also located at the airport is the Army National Guard's Fixed Wing Army Aviation Training Site (FWAATS). The FWAATS trains Army aviators from all three components in the C-12 and C-26 aircraft.

=== Expansion project ===
The original terminal has been in operation since the early 1960s. Construction of a new passenger terminal began in April 2023. The terminal building reached substantial completion in 2024, but its opening was delayed while work continued on parking facilities, access roads, a traffic signal and other supporting infrastructure. In March 2026, Governor Patrick Morrisey announced nearly $2 million in state funding to help complete a new taxiway connecting the runway to the terminal. The taxiway had a total cost of approximately $5 million and was reported to be 98 percent complete at the time.

The new terminal is scheduled to open in August 2026. The new terminal is about four times the size of the old one and will have four gates. The project was reported to cost approximately $70 million.

The expansion also created additional developable land at the airport. By June 2026, airport officials reported a tentative lease with a company planning to construct a general aviation hangar.

In 2026, Pierpont Community and Technical College entered the design phase for a new Aviation Maintenance Training Center at the airport, intended to expand its capacity to train aviation maintenance technicians.

== Economic development ==
The airport is home to the Mid-Atlantic Aerospace Complex which hosts many leading aerospace companies such as Aurora Flight Sciences, Pratt & Whitney, Mitsubishi Heavy Industries (formerly Bombardier), and Lockheed Martin.

=== Fairmont State University ===
Fairmont State University operates its flight school from a facility on the east side of the runway. The school operates Cessna 172's and one Piper PA-23.

== Airlines and destinations ==
Airlines	Destinations	Refs.
Allegiant Air	Orlando/Sanford, St. Petersburg/Clearwater	
United Express	Chicago–O’Hare, Washington–Dulles	

== History ==
The airport opened in 1935 as the Tri-County Airport, a joint effort of Harrison, Marion and Taylor County. It was a grass airstrip on leased land. In 1937, Marion and Taylor County withdrew from the project. In 1938, Harrison County purchased land to expand the airport. In 1944, the airport was renamed Benedum Airport after Michael L. Benedum.

In the 1950s, the airport had 3719-foot runway 5 and 2978-foot runway 16; around 1964, both were replaced by 5200-ft runway 3 and 2500-ft runway 13. The first airline flights were Capital DC-3s in 1949; Lake Central replaced Capital at the end of 1960, and successor Allegheny's last Convair left about the end of 1977. The runway was extended to 7,000 feet (2,100 m) in 1999.

The current airport authority was established in 1960. Enplanements for 2018 were 36,917, up from 25,105 the year before, a 47% increase.

In 2019, West Virginia Governor Jim Justice came to the airport to announce a $20 million investment to be made at the airport: a new terminal, taxiways, and more space for economic development. On June 25, 2021, officials broke ground on the site of the new terminal and 100-acre AeroTech business park with a planned completion of 2023.

In 2022, SkyWest announced the end of service at the North Central West Virginia Airport, along with 28 other cities, due to a pilot shortage. The company stated the service would end within the next 90 days of the announcement. Days after the announcement, the Department of Transportation announced a hold on the termination of service until a replacement could be found, per Essential Air Service rules.

Later that year, the airport authority announced Contour Airlines as the successor to SkyWest. Non-stop flights to Charlotte began in December 2022.

In 2026, the airport announced that SkyWest Airlines, operating as United Express, would return as the airport's Essential Air Service carrier. Service began in April 2026, with 14 round-trip flights per week to Chicago–O'Hare and Washington–Dulles using 50-seat aircraft. The agreement was for a four-year term.

Destinations map
Destinations from North Central West Virginia Airport
Red = Year-round destination
Green = Seasonal destination
Blue = Future destination
Pink = Destination being terminated

== Statistics ==
=== Top destinations ===
Busiest domestic routes from North Central West Virginia (November 2024 – October 2025)
Rank	City	Passengers	Airlines
1	Orlando/Sanford, Florida	16,330	Allegiant
2	Charlotte, North Carolina	10,260	Contour
3	St. Petersburg/Clearwater, Florida	7,670	Allegiant
4	Myrtle Beach, South Carolina	3,300	Allegiant
5	Destin/Fort Walton, Florida	1,590	Allegiant

== Accidents at CKB ==
- On February 12, 1979, Allegheny Airlines Flight 561, a Nord 262 departing for Washington-National Airport, crashed shortly after liftoff and came to rest inverted because of the captain's decision to take off with snow on the aircraft's wing and empennage surfaces. One crewmember and one passenger died out of the 25 occupants on board.

== See also ==
- List of airports in West Virginia

== Other sources ==
- Essential Air Service documents (Docket DOT-OST-2005-20736) from the U.S. Department of Transportation:
  - Notice (March 22, 2005): of Air Midwest, Inc. of its intent to discontinue scheduled non-subsidized Essential Air Service between Clarksburg/Fairmont, West Virginia and Pittsburgh, Pennsylvania, effective June 20, 2005.
  - Order 2005-4-19 (April 19, 2005): prohibiting Air Midwest, Inc., from terminating its unsubsidized, scheduled air service at Parkersburg, Morgantown and Clarksburg/Fairmont, West Virginia, beyond the end of its 90-day notice periods, and requesting proposals from carriers interested in providing replacement essential air service (EAS) at the communities, with or without subsidy.
  - Order 2005-9-8 (September 9, 2005): selecting RegionsAir, Inc. to provide subsidized essential air Service (EAS) at Parkersburg, Morgantown and Clarksburg/Fairmont, West Virginia for a two-year period and establishing a combined subsidy rate of $1,051,333 per year for service consisting of 18 nonstop round trips each week between Parkersburg and Cincinnati, and 18 round trips to Cincinnati each week over a MGW-CKB-CVG-CKB-MGW routing, with 34-seat Saab 340A aircraft.
  - Order 2007-1-16 (January 25, 2007): selecting Colgan Air, Inc. d/b/a US Airways Express to provide subsidized essential air service (EAS) at Parkersburg, Morgantown, and Clarksburg/Fairmont, West Virginia, for two years, beginning when the carrier inaugurates service. Each community will receive 19 weekly round trips to Pittsburgh with 34-passenger Saab 340 aircraft. Service from Parkersburg will be nonstop in each direction. Service from Morgantown and Clarksburg/Fairmont will be served with a Pittsburgh - Morgantown - Clarksburg - Pittsburgh or a Pittsburgh - Clarksburg - Morgantown - Pittsburgh routing. The total combined annual subsidy is $2,421,914.
  - Ninety-Day Notice (March 28, 2008): of intent of Colgan Air Inc. D/B/A United Express to terminate scheduled essential air service at Parkersburg, Morgantown and Clarksburg/Fairmont, WV, effective June 28, 2008.
  - Order 2008-5-37 (May 27, 2008): re-selecting Colgan Air, Inc. d/b/a United Express, to provide subsidized essential air service (EAS) at Morgantown and Clarksburg/Fairmont, West Virginia, at a total annual subsidy rate of $2,116,650, for the two-year period of June 1, 2008, through May 31, 2010,
  - Order 2010-6-25 (June 29, 2010): re-selecting Colgan Air, Inc. to provide essential air service (EAS) at Clarksburg/Fairmont and Morgantown, WV, for a combined annual subsidy of $2,976,438, and at Beckley, WV, for an annual subsidy of $2,313, 457, for the two-year period from August 1, 2010, through July 31, 2012. Also selecting Gulfstream International Airlines, Inc., to provide EAS at Parkersburg, WV/Marietta, OH, at an annual subsidy rate of $2,642,237, for a two-year period beginning when the carrier inaugurates full EAS through the end of the 24th month thereafter. The total annual subsidy for all four communities is $7,923,132.
  - Order 2012-4-32 (April 30, 2012): selecting Silver Airways to provide Essential Air Service (EAS) at Beckley, Clarksburg/Fairmont ("Clarksburg") and Morgantown, West Virginia, for a combined annual subsidy of $5,968,744 ($2,512,494 for Beckley; $3,456,250 for Clarksburg and Morgantown), for the two-year period beginning when the carrier begins full EAS at all three communities.
