= Continental Airlines =

Airline of the United States (1934–2012)

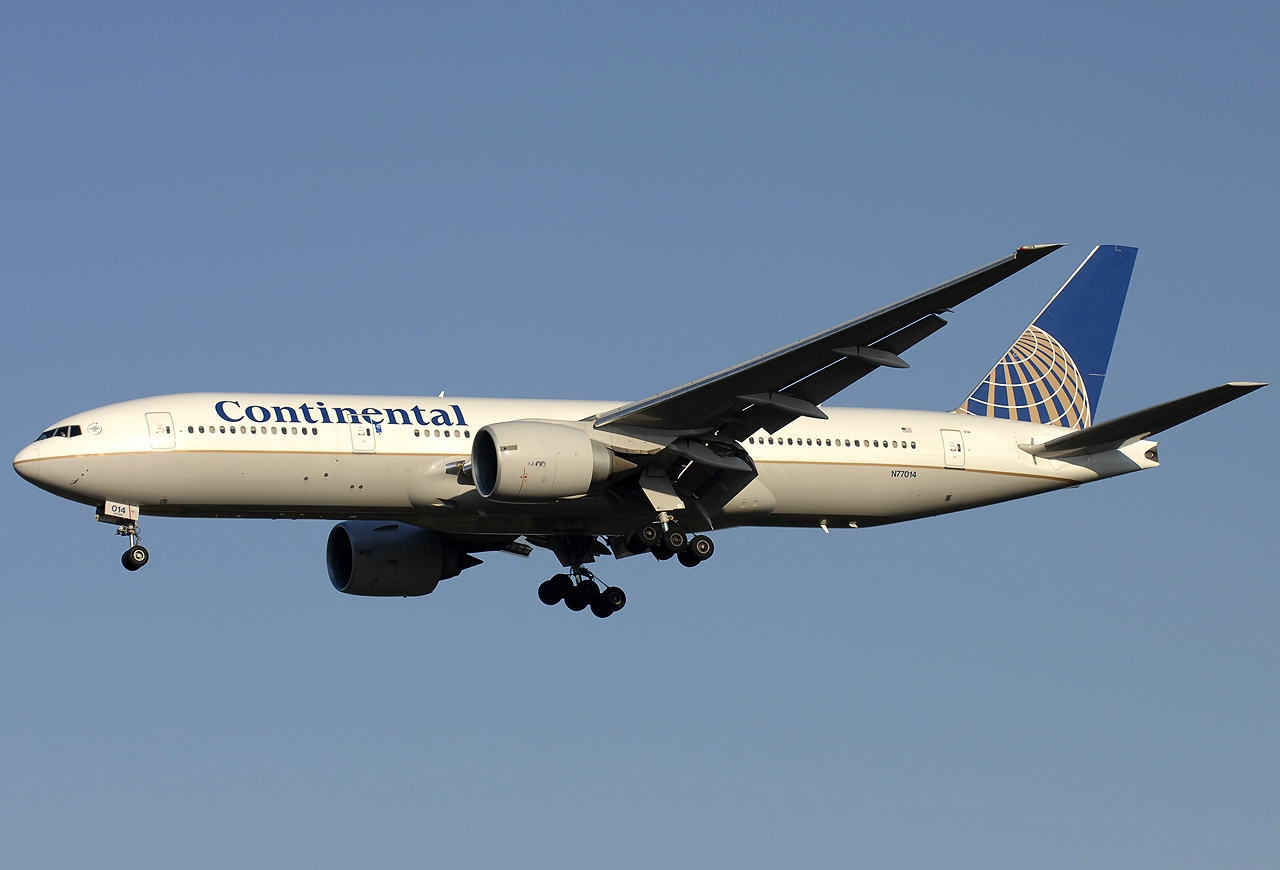
- A Boeing 777-200ER of Continental Airlines in June 2008
IATA	ICAO	Call sign
CO	COA	CONTINENTAL
- Founded: May 1934 (as Varney Speed Lines)
- Commenced operations: May 26, 1937 (as Varney Speed Lines)
- Ceased operations: March 3, 2012 (merged into United Airlines)
- AOC #: CALA014A
- Hubs: Cleveland (1992–2012); Denver–Stapleton (1957–1995); El Paso (1934–1982); Guam (1968–2010); Houston–Intercontinental (1982–2012); Los Angeles (1962–1983); Newark (1987–2012); Washington–Dulles (1987–1989)
- Frequent-flyer program: OnePass
- Alliance: SkyTeam (2004–2009); Star Alliance (2009–2012)
- Subsidiaries: Chelsea Food Services; Continental Air Services, Inc (1965–1975); Continental Connection (1986–2012); Continental Express (1986–2012); Continental Lite (1993–1995); Continental Micronesia (1968–2010)
- Fleet size: 350
- Destinations: 262
- Parent company: Texas Air Corporation (1981–1991); United Continental Holdings (2010–2012)
- Traded as: NYSE: CAL
- Headquarters: El Paso, Texas (1934–1937); Denver, Colorado (1937–1963); Los Angeles, California (1963–1982); Houston, Texas (1982–2012)
- Key people: Robert Six (CEO; 1936–1981); Frank Lorenzo (Texas Air owner); Jeff Smisek; Gordon Bethune; Larry Kellner
- Founders: Walter Varney; Louis Mueller

Continental Airlines (simply known as Continental) was a trunk carrier, a major international airline in the United States that operated from 1934 until it merged with United Airlines in 2012. It had ownership interests and brand partnerships with several carriers.

Continental started out as one of the smaller carriers in the United States, known for its limited operations under the regulated era that provided very fine, almost fancy, service against the larger majors in important point-to-point markets, the largest of which was Chicago/Los Angeles. However, deregulation in 1978 changed the competitive landscape and realities, as noted by Smithsonian Airline Historian R. E. G. Davies: "Unfortunately, the policies that had been successful for more than forty years under [Robert] Six's cavalier style of management were suddenly laid bare as the cold winds of airline deregulation changed all the rules—specifically, the balance between revenues and expenditures."

In 1981, Texas International Airlines acquired a controlling interest in Continental. The companies were merged in 1982, moved to Houston, and grew into one of the country's largest carriers despite facing financial and labor issues, eventually becoming one of the more successful airlines in the United States.

On May 2, 2010, Continental and United Airlines announced an $8.5 billion merger of equals with the United name and Continental operating certificate and globe livery retained, which would be complete on October 1, 2010. Continental's shareholders received 1.05 per share in United stock for each Continental share they owned. Upon completion of the acquisition, UAL Corporation changed its name to United Continental Holdings.

During the integration period, each airline ran a separate operation under the direction of a combined leadership team, based in Chicago. The integration was completed on March 3, 2012.

On June 27, 2019, United changed its parent company name from United Continental Holdings to United Airlines Holdings.

== History ==
=== Early history ===
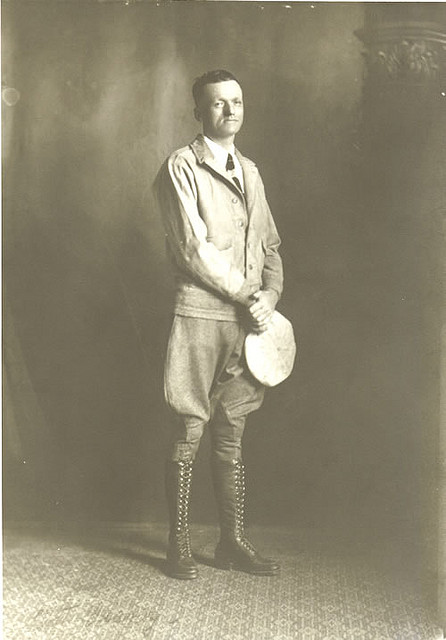
Walter T. Varney, founder of predecessors of United Airlines and Continental Airlines, 1921

1955 Continental and Pioneer networks per the Civil Aeronautics Board case approving the merger

Varney Speed Lines (named after one of its initial owners, Walter T. Varney, who was also a founder of United Airlines) was formed in 1934, operating airmail and passenger services in the American Southwest over a route originating from El Paso and extending through Albuquerque, Santa Fe, and Las Vegas, New Mexico, to Pueblo, Colorado. The airline commenced operations with the Lockheed Vega, a single-engine plane that carried four passengers. Varney was awarded a 17-cent-rate airmail contract between Pueblo and El Paso; it carried passengers as a sideline. Following cancellation of all domestic airmail contracts by the Roosevelt administration in 1934, Robert F. Six learned of an opportunity to buy into the Southwest Division of Varney Speed Lines which needed money to handle its newly won Pueblo-El Paso route. Six was introduced to Louis Mueller (who would serve as chairman of the board of Continental until February 28, 1966). Mueller had helped found the Southwest Division of Varney in 1934 with Walter T. Varney. As an upshot of all this, Six bought into the airline with US$90,000 and became general manager on July 5, 1936. The carrier was renamed Continental Air Lines (later changed to "Airlines") on July 8, 1937. Six relocated the airline's headquarters to Denver Union (later Stapleton) Airport in Denver in October 1937. Six changed the name to "Continental" because he wanted the airline name to reflect his desire to have the airline fly all directions throughout the United States.

During World War II, Continental's Denver maintenance base converted Boeing B-17 Flying Fortresses, Boeing B-29 Superfortresses and North American P-51 Mustangs for the United States Army Air Forces. Profits from military transportation and aircraft conversion enabled Continental to contemplate expansion and acquisition of new airliners after the war. Among those were the Douglas DC-3, the Convair 240 and the Convair 340. The Convairs were Continental's first pressurized airliners. The airline's early route was El Paso to Albuquerque and Denver, with routes being added during the war from Denver, Albuquerque, and El Paso eastward across Kansas, Oklahoma, New Mexico, and Texas. In 1946 Continental flew Denver to Kansas City, Wichita, Tulsa, and to Oklahoma City, and from El Paso and Albuquerque to San Antonio. Each route included stops in several of 22 smaller cities.

In the early 1950s, Continental began several interchange routes with American, Braniff, and United Airlines. Routes were operated on American from Los Angeles and San Francisco to El Paso continuing onto Continental's route to San Antonio and Houston. Continental's Denver to Kansas City route would interchange onto St. Louis with Braniff Airways and United's routes from Seattle and Portland to Denver would interchange with Continental's routes onto Wichita and Tulsa. These interchange routes continued for many years until Continental was able to secure routes of its own between each city.

In 1955, Continental merged with Pioneer Air Lines, gaining access to 16 more cities in Texas and New Mexico. In August 1953, Continental flew to 35 airports and Pioneer flew to 19, but Continental's network didn't reach beyond Denver, El Paso, Houston and Kansas City until April 1957 when it started Chicago-Denver-Los Angeles, two Douglas DC-7Bs a day each way. Pioneer's Executive Vice President Harding Luther Lawrence arrived at Continental as a result of the merger. Bob Six commented on more than one occasion that, "the reason we bought Pioneer was to get Harding." Harding Lawrence implemented several innovative changes at Continental as well as a flamboyant advertising campaign during his ten years as Six's protege. During Lawrence's tenure Continental grew by 500 percent. Lawrence left Continental in April 1965 to head Braniff Airways.

Six petitioned the Civil Aeronautics Board (CAB) for longer routes to larger cities, hoping to transform the regional into a trunkline like United Airlines, TWA, and American Airlines. He was discussing with Boeing for Continental to become one of the first to operate the soon-to-be-launched 707. The timing was crucial, since new routes would justify the 707s, and vice versa.

=== 1960s ===
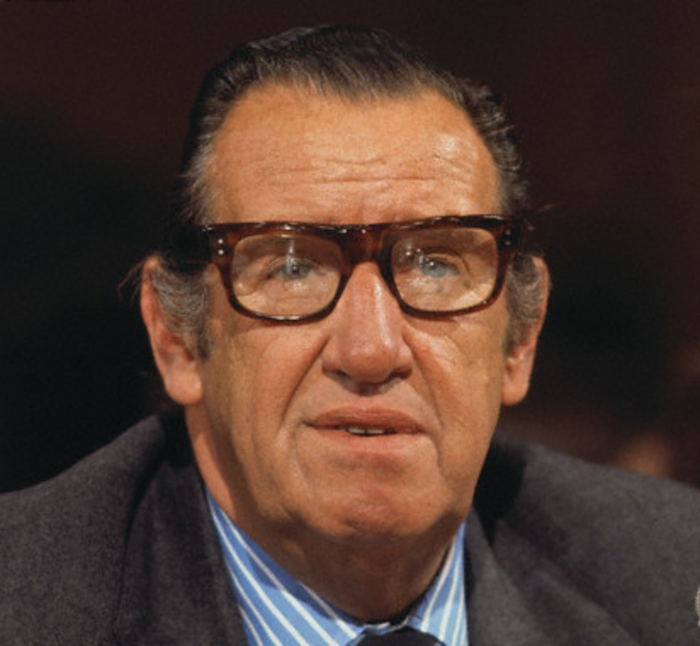
Robert F. Six, chairman-CEO, Continental Airlines, 1936–1981

Continental Airlines had seen a broad expansion of its routes, thanks to a responsive CAB and persistent efforts by Six and Executive Vice President Harding Lawrence (who came to Continental in the Pioneer merger), who both frequently referred to his company as "the Airline that needs to grow." In 1958 Continental began turboprop flights with the Vickers Viscount on the new medium-haul routes. The British-manufactured Viscount four engine turboprop, which Continental referred to as the "Jet Power Viscount II", was the first turbine powered aircraft operated by the airline with Continental claiming it was "First in the west with jet-power flights". The CAB permitted Continental to drop service at many smaller cities, enabling the carrier's new aircraft to operate more economically on longer flights. In 1960 Continental flew more than three times the passenger-miles it had in 1956. (Aviation Week June 22, 1959: "Continental's current re-equipment program—involving a total cost of $64 million for the Boeings, Viscounts and DC-7Bs—was launched in 1955 when the carrier's net worth amounted to $5.5 million.")

During the late 1950s and early 1960s, Six was the airline industry's leading lower-fare advocate. He predicted that increased traffic, not higher fares, was the answer to the airline industry's problems. To amazement from the industry, he introduced the economy fare on the Chicago-Los Angeles route in 1962. He later pioneered a number of other low or discount fares which made air travel available to many who could not previously afford it. One of Continental's early innovations was a system-wide economy excursion fare which cut the standard coach fares by more than 25%. Continental took delivery of the first of five 707-124s in spring 1959, and started Chicago-Los Angeles nonstop on June 8. Having so few jets, Continental needed radical innovations to the 707 maintenance program. It developed the "progressive maintenance" program, which enabled Continental to fly its 707 fleet seven days a week, achieving greater aircraft utilization than any other jet operator in the industry. Six, not being satisfied with 707 service, introduced innovations and luxe cuisine on Continental's 707 flights which were described as, "... nothing short of luxurious" by the Los Angeles Times, and, "... clearly, the finest in the airline industry" by the Chicago Tribune.

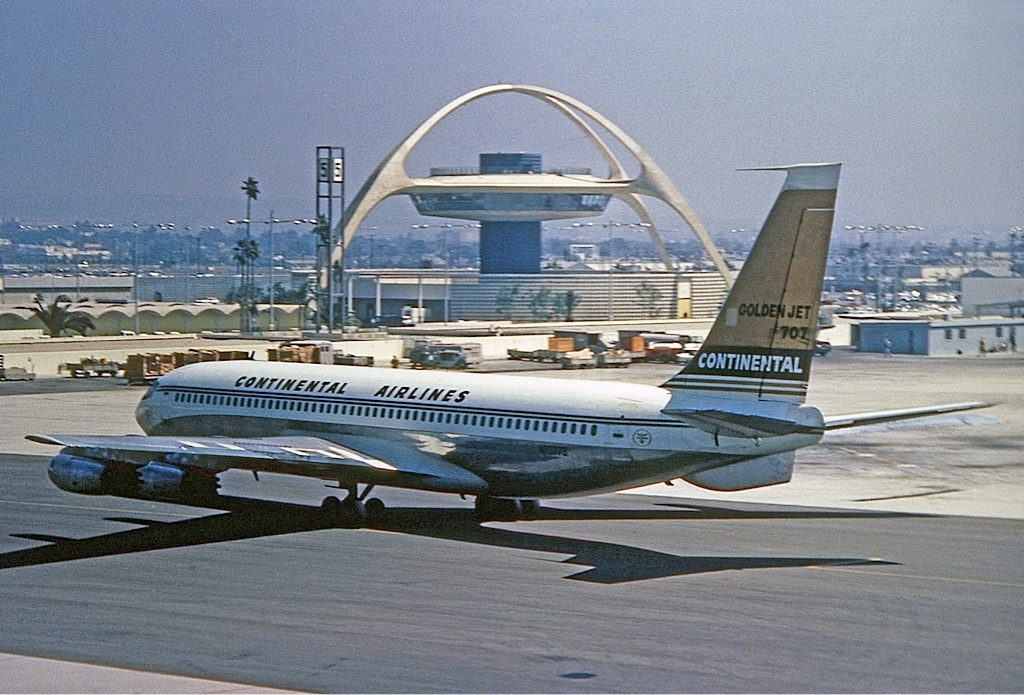
Boeing 707 at Los Angeles, December 1962

In the early 1960s, Continental added flights from Los Angeles to Houston, nonstop as well as via Phoenix, Tucson, El Paso, Midland-Odessa, Austin, and/or San Antonio. In 1963, the company headquarters moved from Denver to Los Angeles. By late 1963, Continental had discontinued service to most of its smaller cities in Kansas, Oklahoma, New Mexico, and Texas with the exception of Lawton, OK and Wichita Falls, TX which continued operating with DC-9 and 727 jets until 1977. Total passenger-miles in 1967 were more than five times greater than in 1960, but 61% of the 1967 total was on unscheduled flights (mostly transpacific charters). During the late 1960s the company disposed of the last of its turboprop and piston-powered aircraft—one of the first U.S. airlines to do so. Continental replaced the Viscount fleet with Douglas DC-9-10s and then added Boeing 727-100s and 727-200s. The DC-9 and 727 were to become the workhorses of the fleet from the late 1960s. The DC-9s were phased out by the late 1970s (although the type reappeared after mergers in the 1980s with an example being Texas International Airlines DC-9s which were added to the CO fleet); the 727-200 was the mainstay of its narrow-body fleet until the late 1980s. In 1968 a new livery was launched: orange and gold cheatlines on a white fuselage; and a black "jetstream" logo (by Six's friend, the noted graphic designer Saul Bass) on the iconic "Golden Tails" of the airline's aircraft. The slogans adopted in 1968 and used for more than a decade were, "The Airline That Pride Built" and, "The Proud Bird with the Golden Tail". 1960s saw international routes awarded to Continental (to New Zealand and Australia) in the Transpacific Case, but they were cancelled by the Nixon Administration.

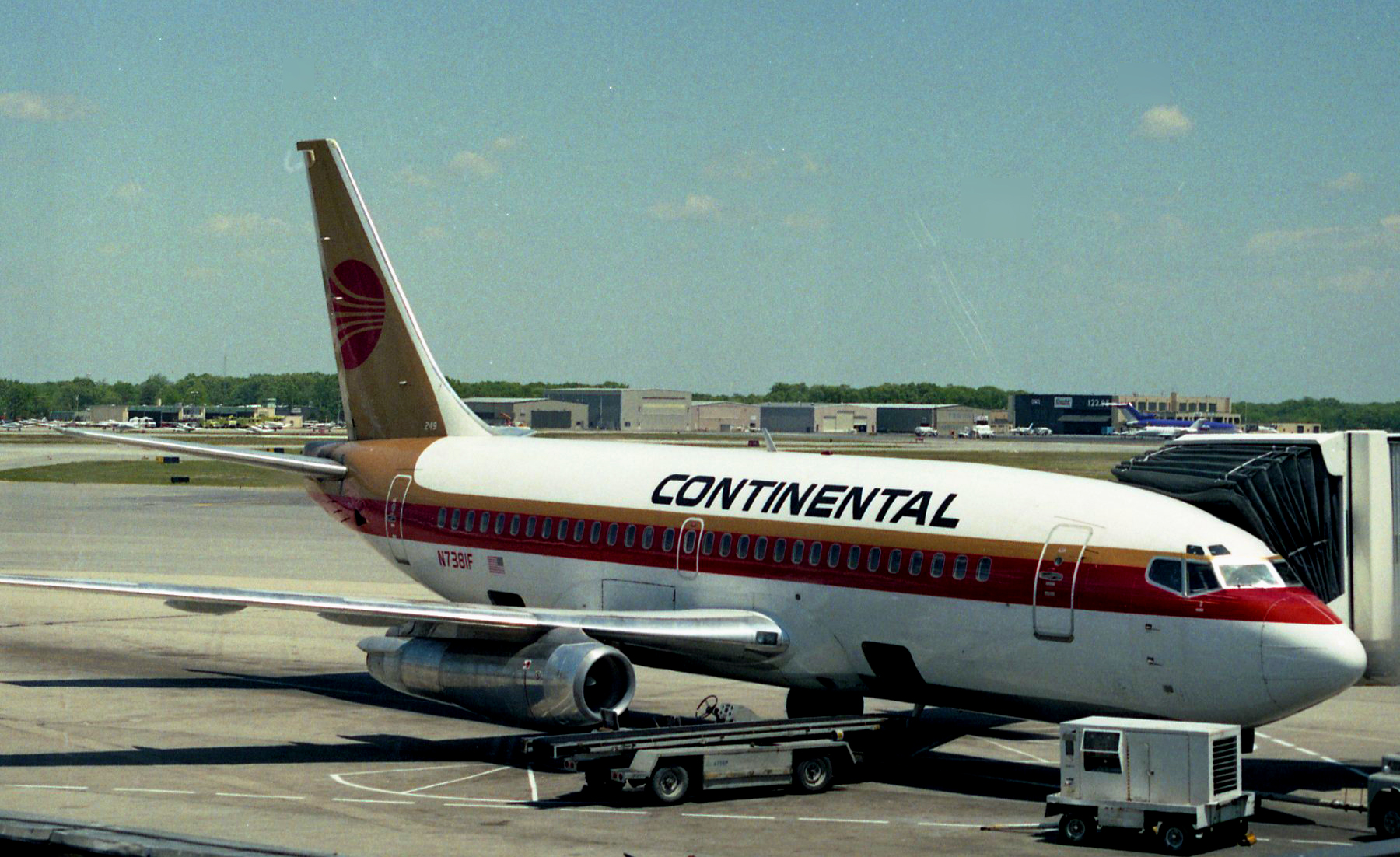
Boeing 737-200 with 1968–1991 "meatball" logo and livery designed by Saul Bass

During the Vietnam War, Continental provided extensive cargo and troop transportation for United States Army and Marine Corps forces to Asian and the Pacific bases. Continental's long range Boeing 707-324Cs were the most common non-military aircraft transiting Saigon Tan Son Nhat airport; in 1967, 39% of CO's passenger-miles were on scheduled flights. With Continental's experience in Pacific operations, the carrier formed subsidiary Air Micronesia in May 1968, inaugurating island hopping routes between Yap/Saipan/Guam, Majuro, Rota, Truk, Ponape (Pohnpei) and Honolulu. "Air Mike", as it was known, initially operated with Boeing 727-100 aircraft with open-ocean survival gear, doppler radar, and a large complement of spare parts (including tires). A senior mechanic flew on every Air Mike flight until the late 1970s. Air Micronesia operated as subsidiary Continental Micronesia until 2010. In September 1969, Continental began flights from Los Angeles to Honolulu/Hilo and one month later from Albuquerque to Chicago, San Antonio, and San Francisco. In 1970, Continental was awarded routes from Seattle and Portland to San Jose, Hollywood-Burbank Airport, and Ontario, California—all of them growing markets.

Revenue passenger-miles (millions) (sched flights only)
	Continental	Pioneer
1951	106	42
1955	221	11
1960	885	(Merged April 1, 1955)
1965	1,386	
1970	4,434	
1975	6,356	

In 1963, Continental denied employment to African-American pilot and Air Force veteran, Marlon D. Green. A United States Supreme Court decision allowed a Colorado anti-discrimination law to be applied to his case against Continental. Green flew with Continental for 13 years from 1965 until his retirement in 1978. His employment paved the way for the hiring of ethnic-minority pilots by all U.S. carriers, an industry milestone which was finally realized in 1977 after Southern Airways hired their first minority pilot.

=== 1970s ===
At Six's insistence, Continental (with Pan Am and Trans World Airlines) was one of the three launch airlines for the Boeing 747. On June 26, 1970, Continental became the second carrier (after TWA) to put the 747 into U.S. domestic service. Its upper-deck first class lounge and main deck "Polynesian Pub" won awards worldwide for the most refined cabin interior among all airlines, as did meal services developed by Continental's Cordon Bleu-trained executive chef, Lucien DeKeyser. Continental's 747 services from Chicago and Denver to Los Angeles and Honolulu set the standard for service in the western U.S. On June 1, 1972, Continental's widebody DC-10 service began. Six had insisted that Continental place a large order for DC-10s with manufacturer McDonnell Douglas. This decision again proved prescient, since the publicity associated with Continental's splashy 747 service Chicago-Denver-Los Angeles-Honolulu had stimulated increased market share and increased traffic for all carriers. Denver, Houston and Seattle were growing rapidly in the 1970s; the DC-10s took over most flights between Denver and Chicago, Los Angeles, Houston and Seattle, and between Houston and Los Angeles.

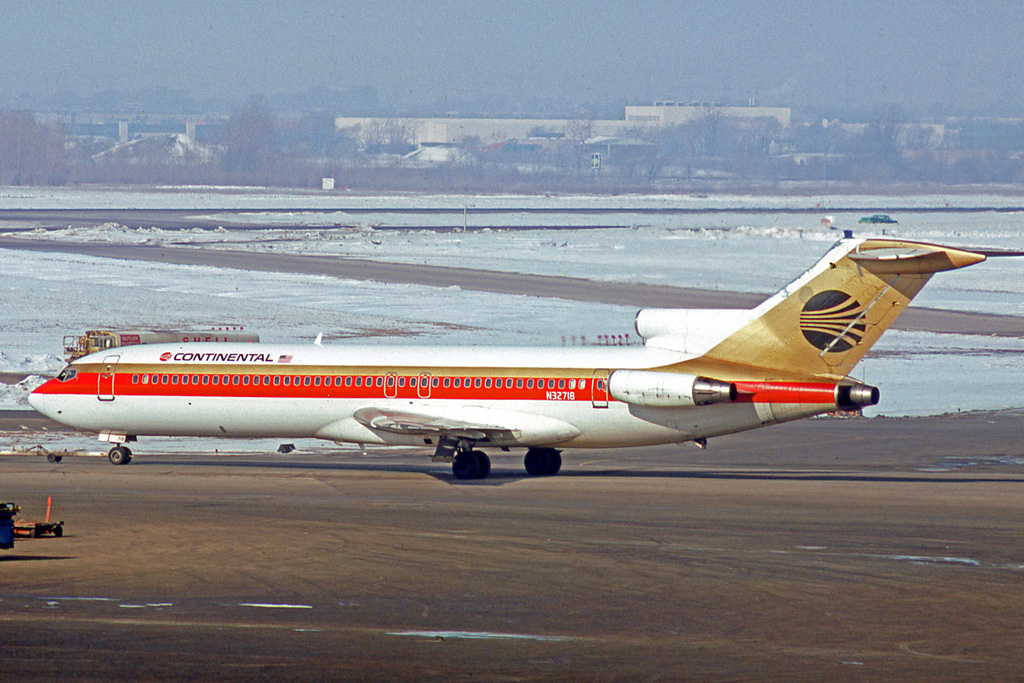
Boeing 727-224 at Chicago O'Hare Airport in 1978

During the 1970s, Denver served as the airline's main hub. The 747s were focused on the Chicago-Los Angeles-Honolulu routes, with one daily round trip through Denver. The DC-10s served large markets (Los Angeles to Chicago, Denver, Houston and Honolulu; and from Denver to Chicago, Los Angeles, Seattle and Houston). DC-9s and 727s predominated elsewhere and added frequencies on DC-10 routes. Next to Braniff, Continental operated fewer aircraft types (four: the 747, DC-10, 727-200, and DC-9-10) during this period than any U.S. trunkline, affording savings in parts, maintenance, and crew training. The DC-10 enabled the airline to capitalize on traffic growth in the west. Continental saw market share grow annually in each DC-10 market through the 1970s, until relative market parity was achieved with United, the principal competitor on most of the DC-10 routes. The same innovations introduced on the 747s appeared on Continental's DC-10s, including the "Polynesian Pub", but after the 1973 oil crisis more seats were needed and the DC-10 pubs were removed. Continental phased out its 747s in 1978 in favor of the DC-10s (747s would return to Continental during the Lorenzo era, flying Newark to London and Paris). From the mid-1970s until it merged with Texas International, Continental operated only DC-10s, 727-100s, and 727-200s.

From 1961 to 1982, Continental was headquartered at the west end of the Los Angeles International Airport on World Way West. The facility included the general offices, system operations control, the central maintenance facility, flight kitchen, and Los Angeles crew bases.

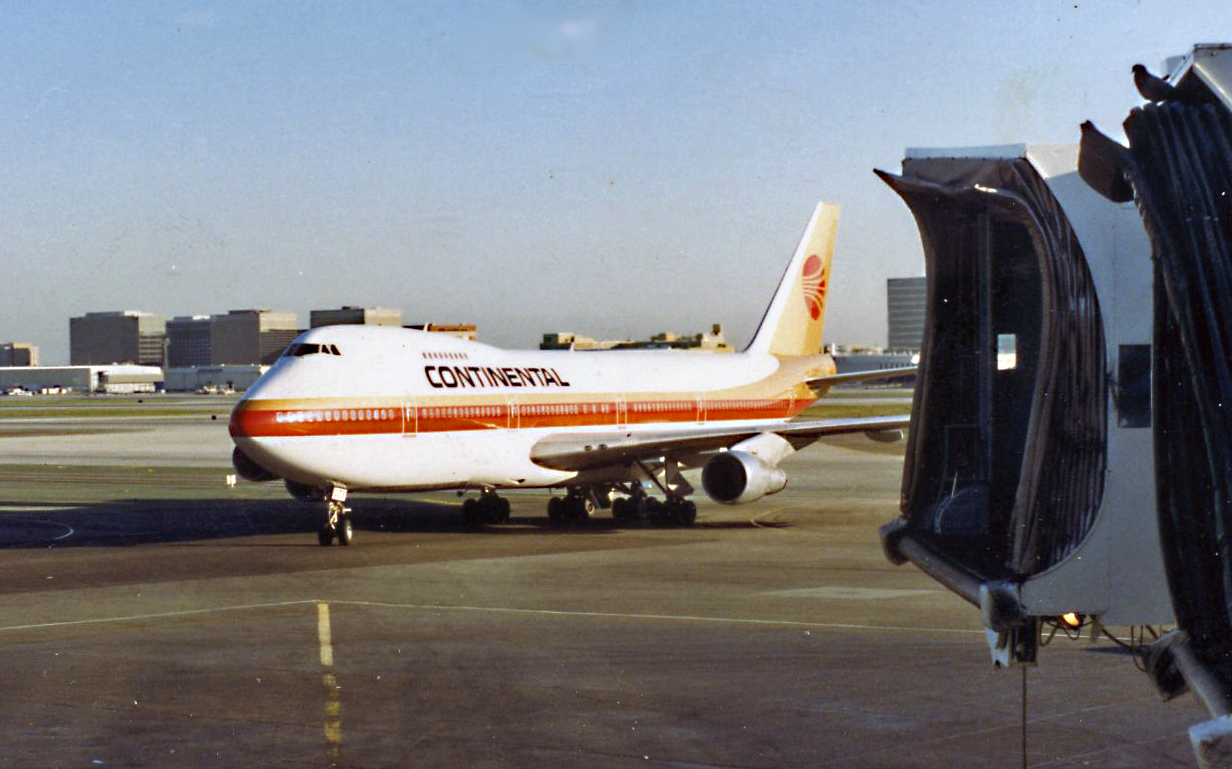
Continental Boeing 747 at Los Angeles in 1987

In 1974, after years of delays and legal proceedings, Continental started flights between Houston and Miami, and on May 21, 1976, Continental was authorized to operate long-sought routes between San Diego and Denver. President Jimmy Carter and Civil Aeronautics Board chairman Alfred Kahn had been promoting deregulation of the airline industry, which would dissolve the CAB and for the first time in industry history allow U.S. carriers to determine without government supervision where they would fly, and how much they could charge. Continental began flights from Denver to Miami/Ft. Lauderdale and Tampa/St. Petersburg in Florida. That year, President Carter authorized Continental to begin daily round trips between Air Micronesia destination Saipan and Japan, and approved a route for Continental from Los Angeles to Australia via Honolulu, American Samoa, Fiji, New Zealand and Australia. The South Pacific service began May 1, 1979. After the 1978 passage of the Airline Deregulation Act Continental embarked on a route expansion. October 1978 saw Continental begin flights from the New York area airports to Houston and Denver, and from Denver to Phoenix. That month Continental started DC-10 flights between Los Angeles and Taipei, via Honolulu and Guam. Service between Houston and Washington, D.C., began in January 1979. In June 1979 Continental linked Denver with Washington, D.C., Las Vegas, San Francisco and San Jose and also began Houston-Tampa service. The airline suffered in 1979 when the DC-10 was grounded nationwide following the crash of American Airlines Flight 191. Continental Airlines only operated the DC-10 and the 727 at the time, so flights to Hawaii were cancelled during the grounding. By the time of the Texas Air Corp. acquisition in 1981, Continental's post-deregulation growth had allowed it to penetrate every major U.S. airline market (and all of the regional markets) from the hubs in Denver and Houston, with the corresponding expansion of facilities at both of these airports. But that growth came at the cost of continuing losses. In Denver, Continental's rapid growth provided the final impetus for the construction of the new Denver International Airport, which would be completed almost fifteen years later.

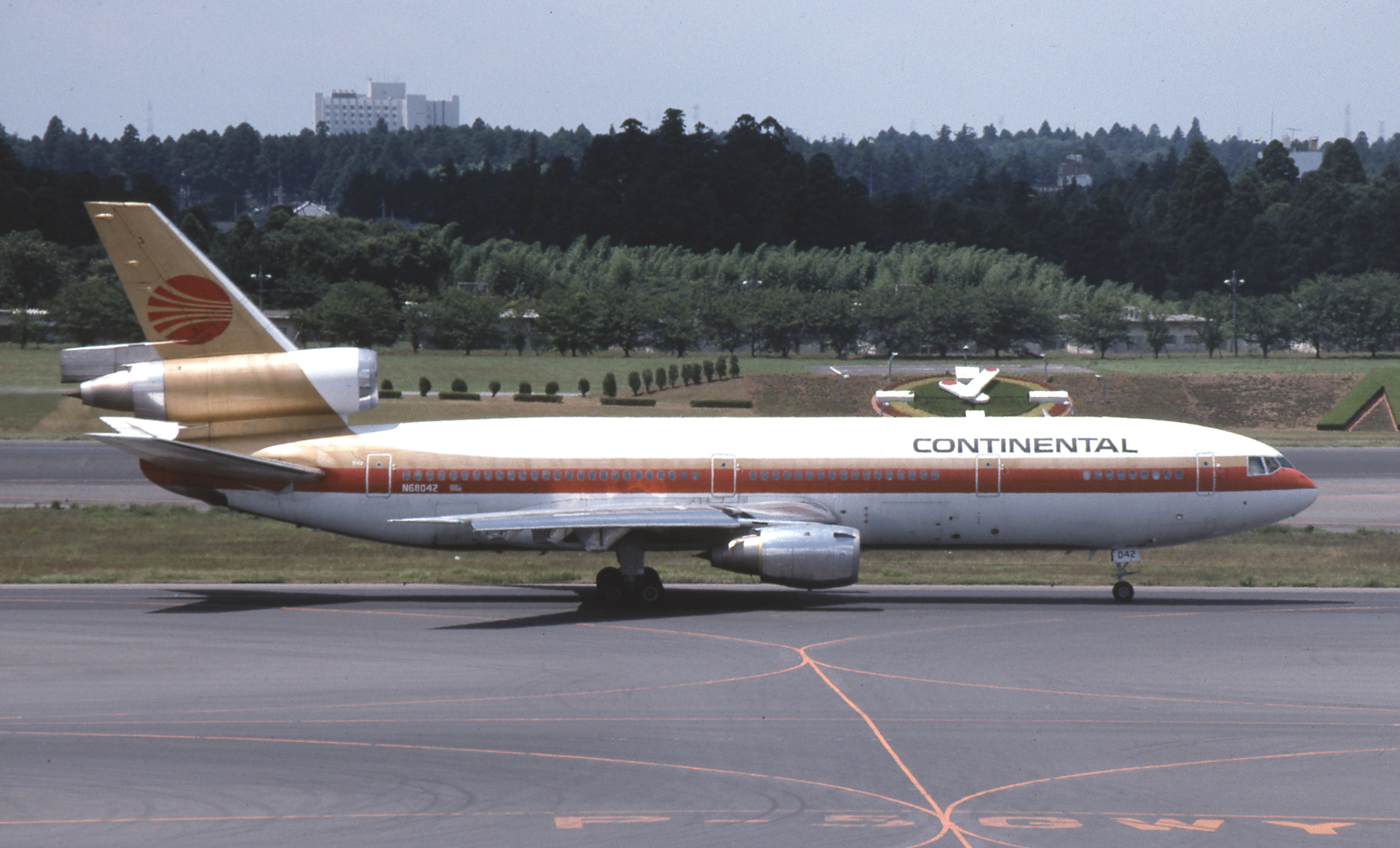
Continental DC-10 at Narita Airport, Japan

While deregulation allowed Continental to expand into new areas, it hurt the company's existing business as consumers were for the first time able to choose lower fares over Continental's better service. In 1978 Continental and Western Airlines, which held a nearby headquarters and similar fleet, began a nearly three-year attempt to merge.

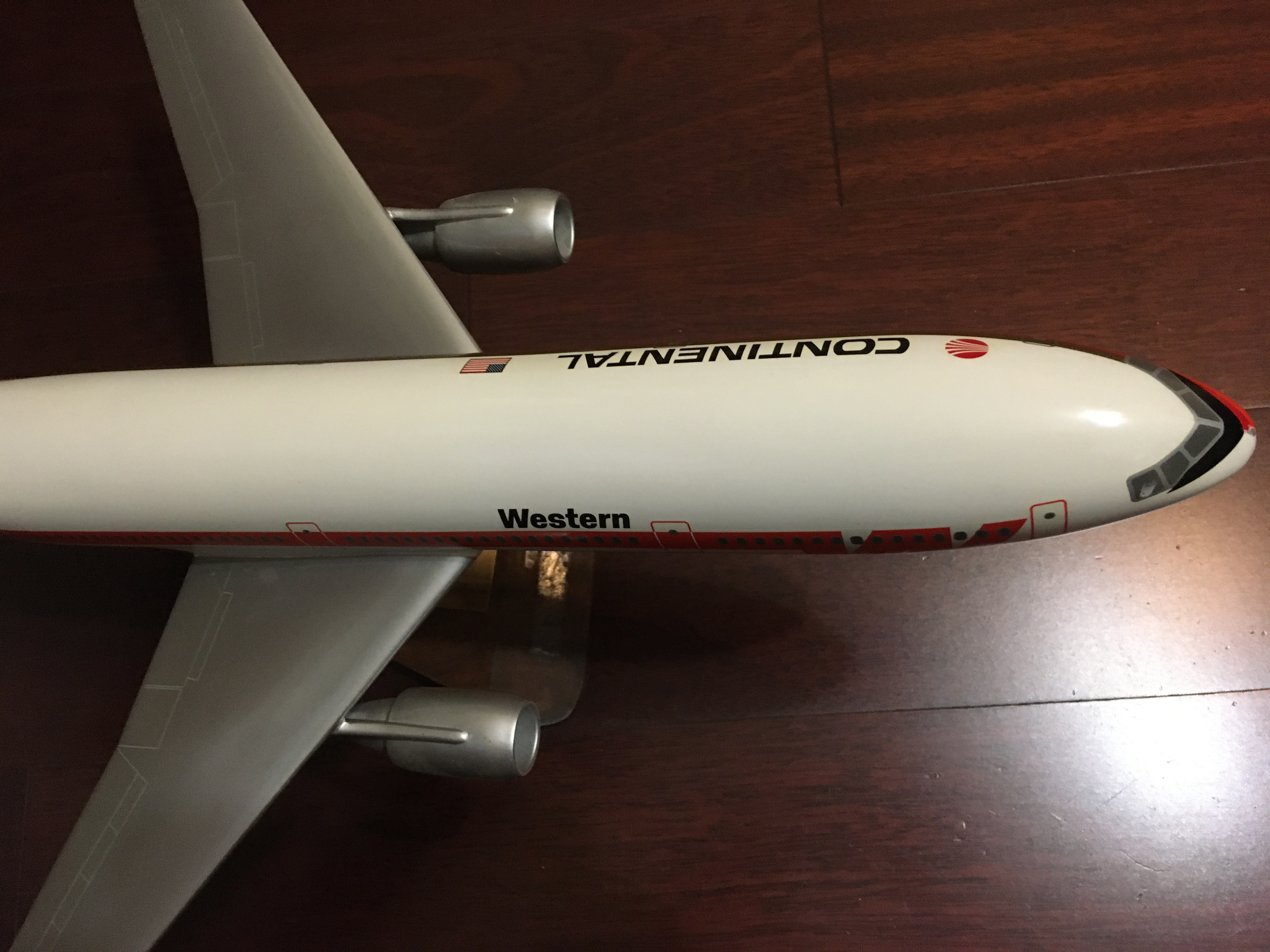
DC-10 model used in announcement of planned Continental–Western merger

The route systems would have been complementary, with little overlap; although they both served the Western states, Continental had strength in Hawaii, southern-tier and the Great Plains states; Western's strengths were in the California intrastate market, Alaska, Mexico, and the Intermountain West. Both airlines served the Pacific Northwest and Rocky Mountain states, but along different routes from Los Angeles, Denver, San Francisco, Seattle and Phoenix. The merger attempt failed when Texas Air Corporation interceded with its acquisition of Continental. With the Airline Deregulation Act the world changed for Continental as noted by Smithsonian historian R.E.G. Davies: "Unfortunately, the policies that had been successful for more than forty years under (Robert) Six's cavalier style of management were suddenly laid bare as the cold winds of airline deregulation changed all the rules -- specifically, the balance between revenues and expenditures."

=== 1980s ===
In 1981, Texas Air Corporation, an airline holding company controlled by U.S. aviation entrepreneur Frank Lorenzo, acquired Continental after a contentious battle with Continental's management who were determined to resist Lorenzo. Management teamed with unions to create a planned Employee Stock Ownership Plan (ESOP) that would have doubled the number of outstanding shares without shareholder approval, thus diluting Texas Air's ownership stake and maintaining control of the airline. But management lost the legal battle to enact the ESOP without shareholder approval and with its 48.5 percent ownership stake, Texas Air could win any shareholder vote. During this struggle, in August 1981, Continental Airlines CEO Alvin Feldman died from suicide in his office and was succeeded by George Warde. In three letters left to his children, Feldman said he had been depressed since the death of his wife the previous year. Lorenzo became Continental Chairman and CEO in March 1982. He and his team viewed the company as stuck in the pre-deregulation era and in need of serious changes to be competitive. Continental was experiencing significant financial challenges both before and after Texas Air's takeover, and management showed how Continental could not compete and survive with its cost structure. The pilots union agreed to some cost reductions in mid-1982, primarily through modest productivity improvements, but there was no progress with the other unions. On October 31, 1982, following approval by shareholders of both companies, Continental merged operations with Texas International, retaining the Continental identity and offering service to four continents (North and South America, Asia and Australia) with a fleet of 112 aircraft. Continental launched its frequent flyer program, initially called Travel Bank, in September 1982, following that of Texas International Airlines in 1979, which was the industry's first frequent flyer program, and American Airlines AAdvantage program in 1981. In mid-1983, Continental relocated its headquarters to Texas International's base in Houston, Texas, which resulted in a large expansion of its hub at Houston Intercontinental Airport and extensive new routes to Mexico and the south central U.S.

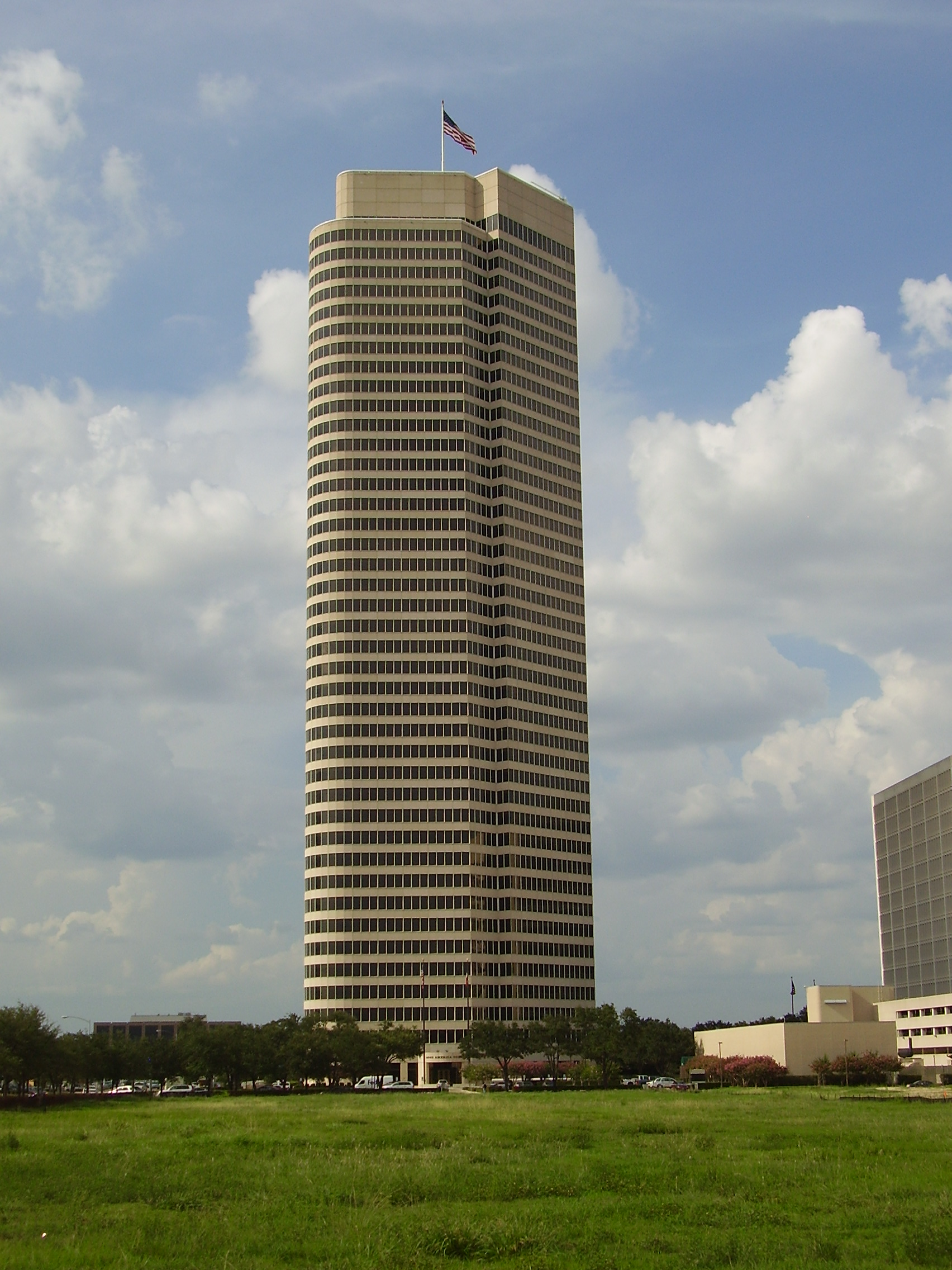
The America Tower in Neartown Houston, Continental's headquarters from 1983 to 1998

Even with the cost reductions from the pilots in 1982, Continental faced a major competitive threat in 1983 when American Airlines was able to implement two-tier wage structures with its unions. American planned massive, rapid growth through new hires at starting pay 50 percent lower than existing contracts and equitable with low-cost, startup carriers and well below Continental's pay rates. American was already one of Continental's main competitors, operating a larger hub 250 miles north of Continental's southern hub in Houston and the growth that was funded by the lower pay rates was larger than all of Continental at the time.

In 1983, Continental went to its unions to restructure labor costs to compete with the startup carriers and American's Plan B labor costs. After 19 months of negotiations, the International Association of Mechanics and Aerospace Workers went on strike in August 1983, even though the company was offering 20 percent pay raises in return for substantial productivity improvements. Continental was able to operate through the strike because many mechanics crossed picket lines and Continental hired new mechanics. The company continued to negotiate with the pilots and flight attendants and management gave a final proposal to its pilots in mid-September, which would have provided ownership by the pilots and other employees of 35 percent of the company's stock in return for meaningful wage and productivity changes. With no agreement, Continental filed Chapter 11 bankruptcy on September 24, 1983, and shut down for three days. Continental was the first airline to file for bankruptcy with a plan to continue operating as it did continuously starting September 27, 1983.

Airline unions fought Continental at every step. On October 1, 1983, the pilots and flight attendants joined the IAM, which was still on strike. When Continental resumed service three days after filing Chapter 11, it initially served 25 cities versus the more than 70 cities previously. In the initial stages of bankruptcy, with no legal agreement that would allow travel agents to book flights, passengers could only book directly with the airline. And, with no credit card agreements, Continental could only accept cash for travel. Continental began offering flights for only $49 for each nonstop segment, raising it later to $75 on any segment. In the federal courts, the unions unsuccessfully sued to stop the company's reorganization. They were later successful in working to persuade Congress to pass a new bankruptcy law preventing bankrupt companies from terminating contracts as Continental had successfully done, but the law was too late to affect Continental. Chapter 11 saved the company from liquidation, but required substantial reorganization, which began immediately. Following bankruptcy, Continental was freed of its contractual obligations and imposed a series of new labor agreements on its union workers, sharply reducing the airline's labor costs. Continental's senior management also reduced their salaries to those of the pilots. The pilot strike was ultimately unsuccessful due to Continental pilots and new hires who crossed the picket line, and customers who voted with their pocketbook. Continental became vastly more competitive with the new airline startups then emerging and thriving in the southwestern U.S. By the end of 1984, Continental had grown back to be a larger airline than pre-bankruptcy and that year recorded a $50 million profit. Continental was the first airline to largely gradually replace a pilot workforce and the working pilots ultimately voted the union out.

On April 28, 1985, Continental inaugurated its first scheduled service to Europe with flights from Houston to London/Gatwick. Additional service from Newark to London and Paris started after the airline's merger with PeopleExpress Airlines in 1987. With that merger came significant customer service issues, especially in the Northeast, for a period of time. In October 1985, Texas Air Corp. made an offer for a Denver-based regional carrier, Frontier Airlines, opening a bidding war with PeopleExpress, which was headed by Lorenzo's former Texas International associate Don Burr. PeopleExpress paid a substantial premium for Frontier's high-cost operation. The acquisition, funded by debt, did not seem rational to industry observers from either the route integration or the operating philosophy points of view. On August 24, 1986, Frontier filed for bankruptcy and ceased operations. With PeopleExpress losing money, Texas Air announced the acquisition of PeopleExpress on September 15, 1986, at the same time gaining Frontier, whose strong network in the Great Plains and intermountain West reinforced Continental's already formidable Denver hub. The PeopleExpress acquisition also provided the option to acquire Terminal C at Newark Liberty International Airport and allow Continental to build a formidable hub in the New York market.

With a reorganization plan that repaid creditors 100 percent, Continental emerged from bankruptcy on June 30, 1986, with improved asset and cash flow positions and a more competitive route structure with routes radiating to every large U.S. city from major hubs at Denver and Houston. Continental also began developing its Midwest hub at Cleveland Hopkins International Airport in 1986, just as United Airlines began to transfer its Cleveland hub operations to Washington Dulles International Airport in Fairfax County, Virginia. In October 1986, American Airlines senior vice president Thomas G. Plaskett became the president and CEO of Continental Airlines. On February 1, 1987, People Express, Frontier, New York Air, and several commuter carriers were merged into Continental Airlines to create the sixth largest airline in the world and became the largest low-fare airline by introducing the industry's first non-refundable airfares, initially called MaxSavers. The mergers and the aggressive marketing led to Continental becoming an even larger player in the northeastern markets. In July 1987, Plaskett resigned and Lorenzo returned to the position of CEO. 1987 saw the creation of Continental's OnePass frequent flier program (jointly with Eastern Airlines); and, in 1988, Continental formed its first strategic partnership (and the first international airline alliance of its kind) with Scandinavian Airlines System (SAS). Continental also made a major image change with a blue and gray livery and the "globe" logo that was adopted by the post-merger United Airlines. The airline also eliminated first class service—and only the second global carrier to take that action—giving business class passengers the same first class seats, a service change later to be marketed as Business First.

=== 1990s ===
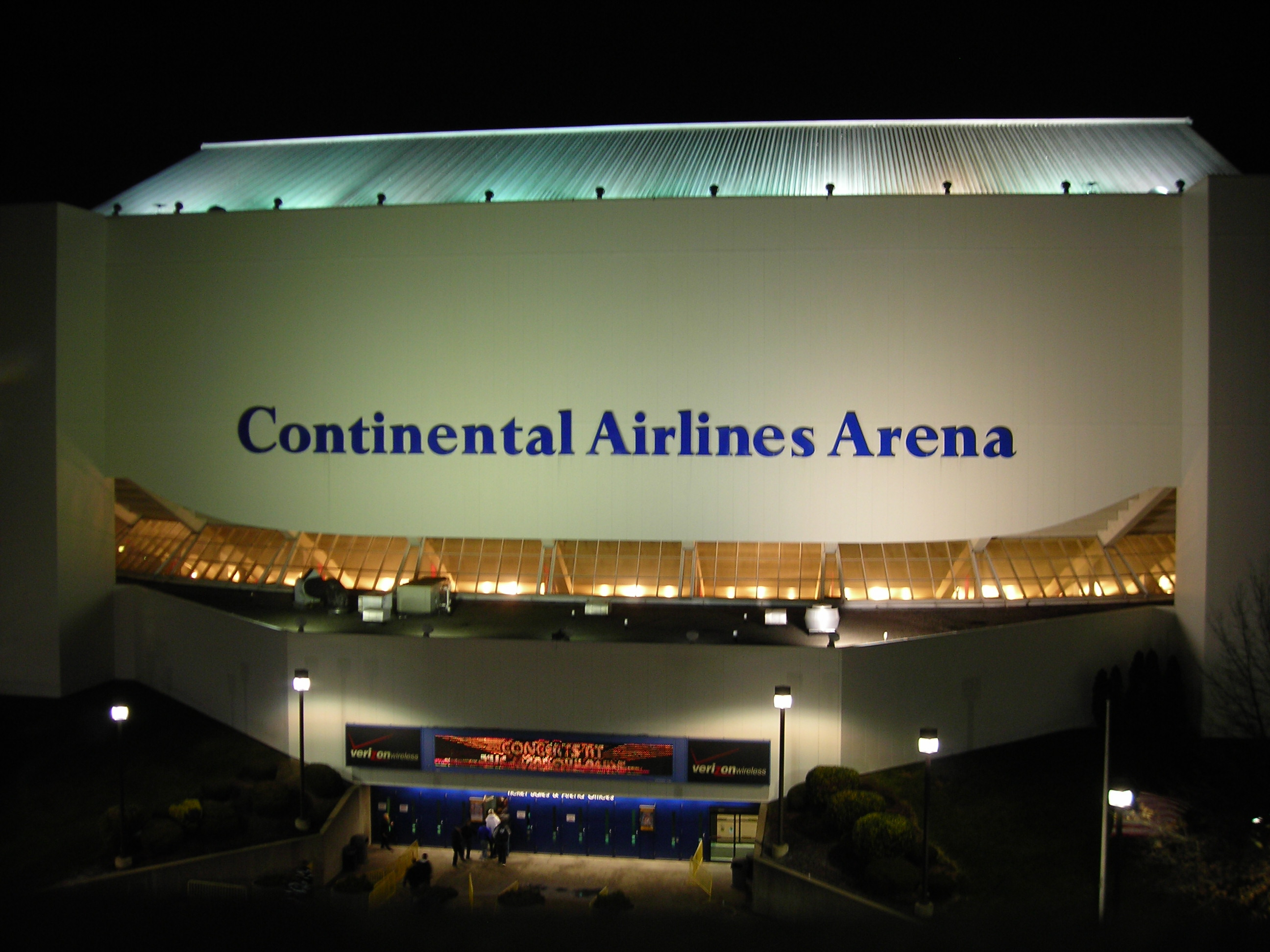
Continental's reemergence from its second bankruptcy was signaled by its taking on the naming rights to the arena in the Meadowlands Sports Complex, which is located near its New Jersey hub, in 1996. It held these rights until 2007.

On August 3, 1990, Scandinavian Airlines System (SAS) and Texas Air announced that Jet Capital Corporation, which owned controlling interest in Texas Air, was selling its interest to SAS. Under the agreements, Lorenzo would be leaving the active management of the airline as CEO for the first time in 18 years and would remain on the board of directors for two further years. At the same time, Hollis Harris, formerly President of Delta Air Lines, was named chairman and chief executive officer.

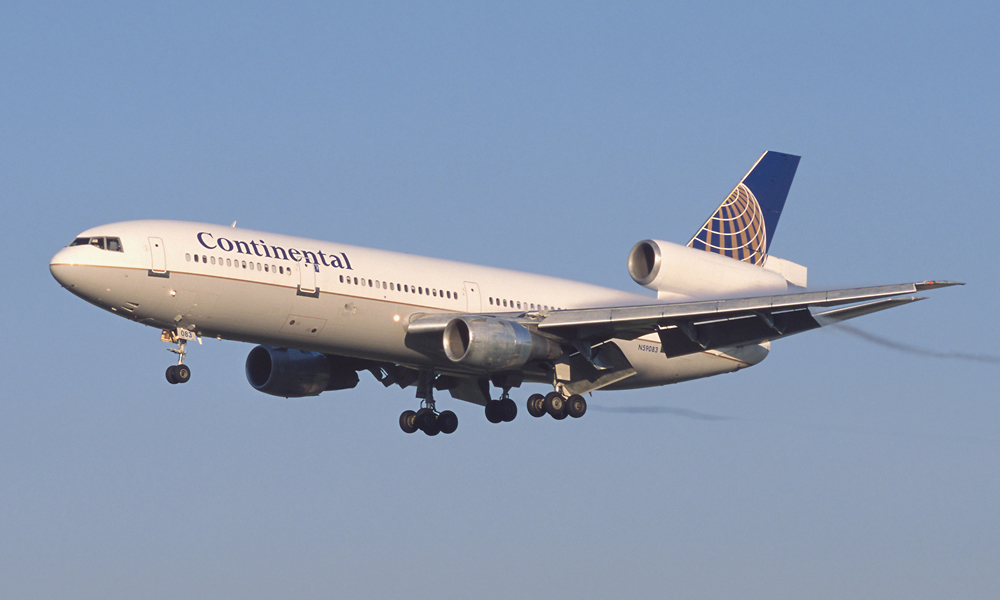
A Continental Douglas DC-10. The type was retired in 2001.

On December 3, 1990, due to the 1990 Iraqi invasion of Kuwait and the resultant Gulf War, which had prompted a dramatic increase in the price of jet fuel, Continental filed for bankruptcy. In mid-1991 Harris was replaced as CEO by Robert Ferguson, who had been a Texas Air executive. In November 1992, Continental accepted a $450 million buyout offer from an investor group composed of Air Partners, an investor from Texas led by Texas Pacific Group, and Air Canada. Under the arrangements, Air Canada would have 24 percent of the voting stock, while Air Partners would hold 41 percent of voting interest in the reorganized Continental. Continental emerged from bankruptcy in April 1993.

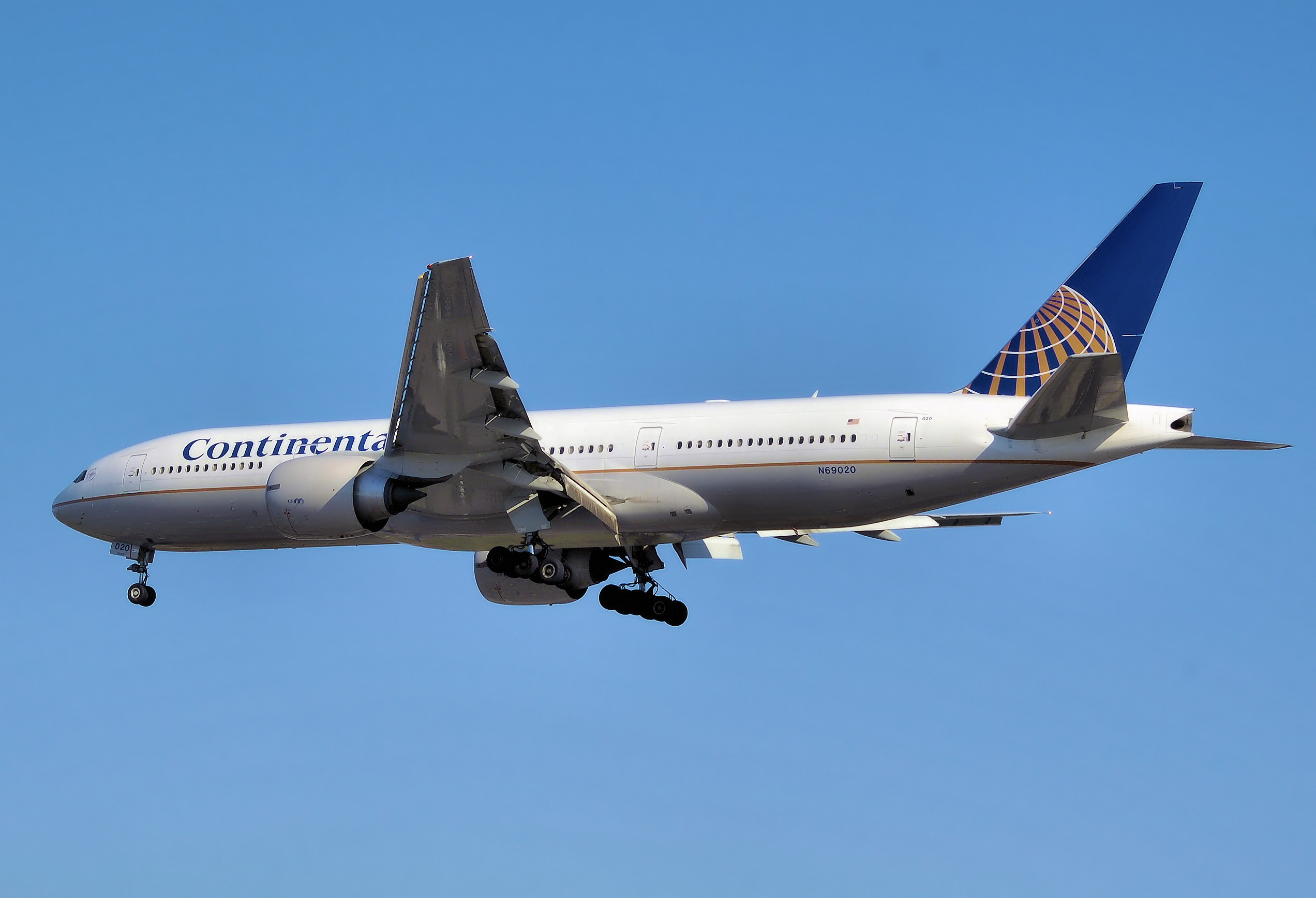
Boeing 777-200ER in April 2008

In March 1993, the airline cancelled its services to nine U.S. destinations and six non-U.S. destinations, including all 24 weekly services between the United States and Australia and New Zealand in addition to its flights between Guam and Australia, effective October 31 of that year. In 1994, Continental substantially reduced its jet services in Denver and terminated all turboprop operations, which had been unprofitable, reducing Denver from being a hub to a spoke city.

Between 1993 and 1995, Continental experimented with an "airline within an airline" by launching CALite, later renamed Continental Lite, which provided all-economy, low-fare, no-frills service between primarily leisure destinations. Continental Lite operated with a dedicated fleet of 100 McDonnell Douglas DC-9-30, Boeing 737-300, and Boeing 737-500 aircraft, each repainted with the 'Lite' livery and stripped of its first class cabin. The service was based primarily at Continental's existing hub in Cleveland as well as a new hub established in Greensboro, North Carolina. The experiment proved unsuccessful and was dissolved in 1995. Continental's short-lived Greensboro hub was dismantled in the process. During this time period Continental was the subject of hostile takeover bids submitted by Delta Air Lines and Northwest Airlines.

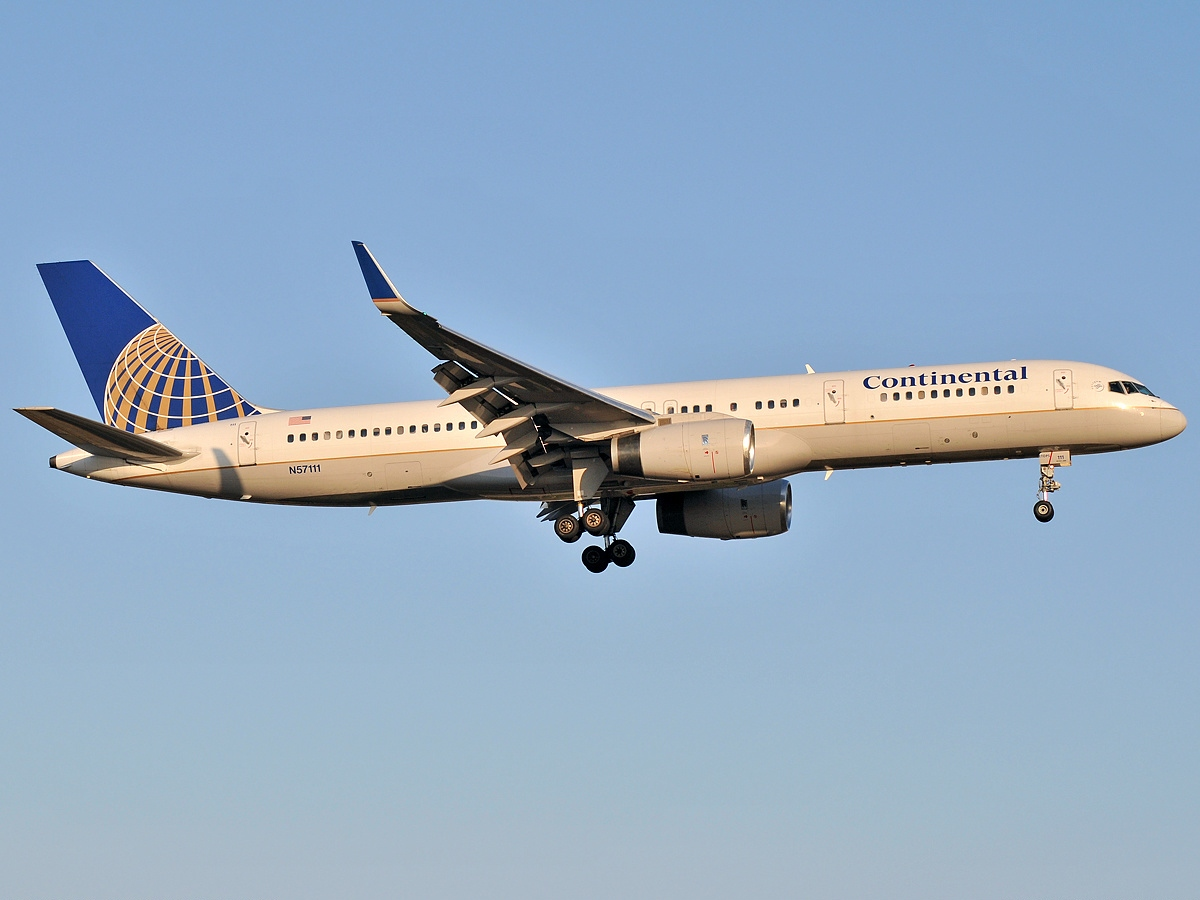
Boeing 757-200 in 1991–2010 livery in August 2009

Former Boeing executive Gordon Bethune became president and CEO in October 1994 and was elected chairman of the board of directors in 1996. Continental went from being ranked last in most performance categories to winning more J.D. Power and Associates awards for Customer Satisfaction than any other airline. BusinessWeek magazine named Bethune one of the top 25 Global Managers in 1996 and 1997. Under his leadership Continental's stock price rose from $2 to over $50 per share. Fortune named Continental among the 100 Best Companies to Work for in America for six consecutive years. In his final year piloting the airline Fortune magazine ranked Continental 2004's No. 1 Most Admired Global Airline, a title it earned again in 2005, 2006, 2007 and 2008. While at Continental, Bethune created the Go-Forward plan, to fix problems with the airline, which included employee morale, the quality of the product, and the route structure, among others. Bethune began by ordering new aircraft in an effort to convert to an all-Boeing fleet.

Beginning in 1998, Continental again embarked on a program to expand its international operations. It inaugurated services to Ireland and Scotland, and in October 1998 the airline received its first Boeing 777-200ER aircraft, allowing nonstop flights from Newark and Houston to Tokyo–Narita, and from Newark to Tel Aviv, Israel. Continental in the same year launched partnerships with Northwest Airlines, Copa Airlines, Avant Airlines, Transbrasil, and Cape Air, and Continental and America West Airlines became the first two US airlines to launch interline electronic ticketing. In 1999, Continental Airlines started service between Newark and Zurich, Switzerland, and from Cleveland to London.

=== 2000s ===
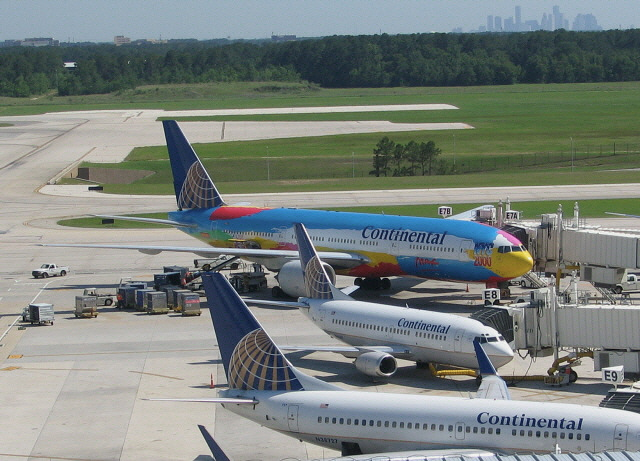
Boeing 777-200ER "Peter Max" (the colorful aircraft) at George Bush Intercontinental Airport in Houston, Texas (December 2006). Downtown Houston is visible in the background. The livery was removed in the winter of 2007–2008

On March 1, 2001, Continental launched a nonstop service from Newark to Hong Kong, operating over the North circumpolar route. It was the first nonstop long-haul route for any airline with flying duration exceeding 16 hours. The service initiated a brief dispute between Continental, United Airlines and Cathay Pacific over rights to nonstop flights between Hong Kong and New York. On September 13, 2004, Continental entered the SkyTeam alliance along with Northwest/KLM and CSA. In 2005, Continental expanded service from Newark to Beijing after being awarded the China route. Among U.S. airlines, only Delta (with its extensive network of legacy routes dating from Delta's acquisition of Pan American's European network) served more European destinations than Continental.

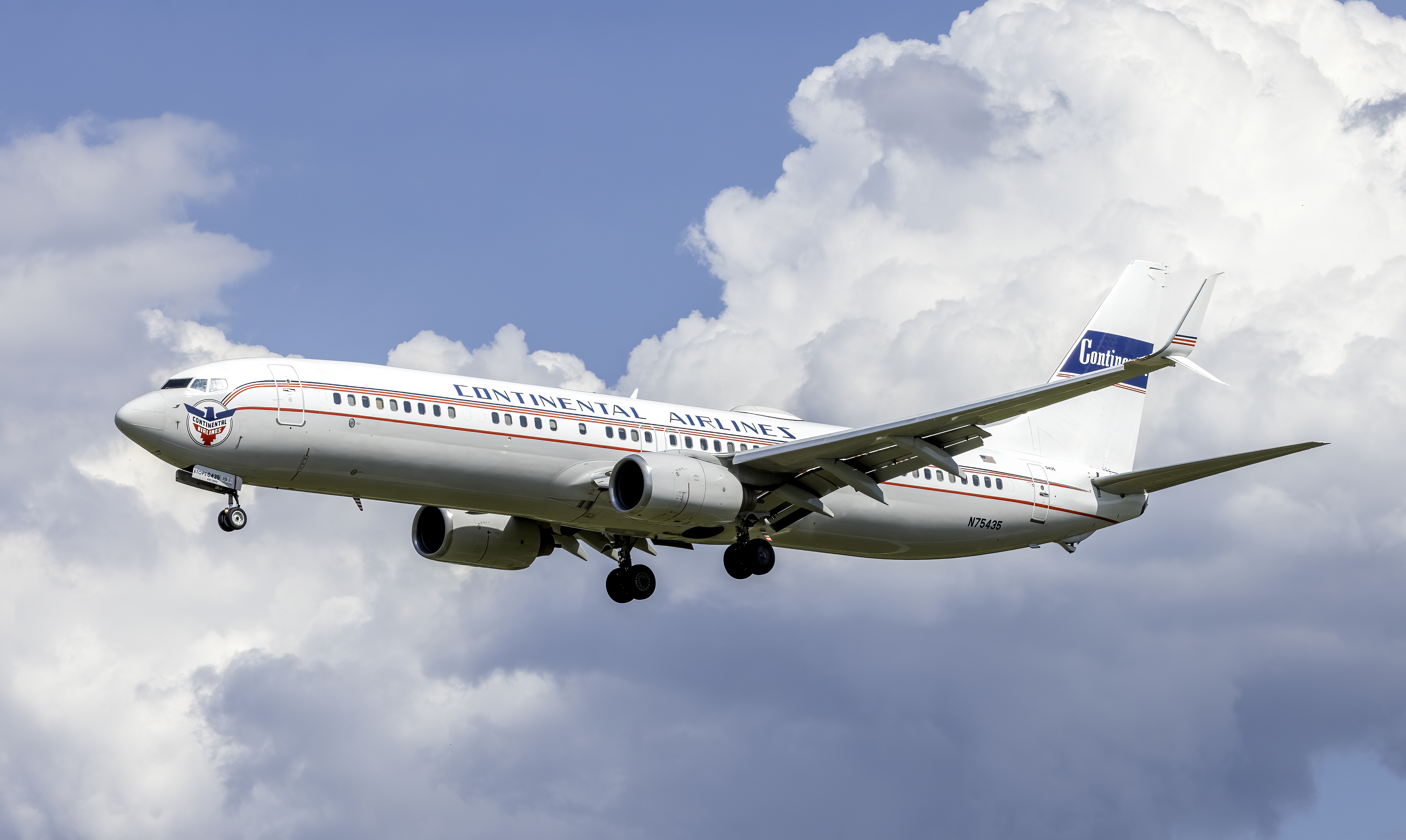
To commemorate Continental's 75th Anniversary, a Boeing 737-900ER aircraft registered N75436 was painted with Continental's 1947 "Blue Skyways" livery when it was delivered in June 2009. United Airlines continues to fly this retro livery on a different Boeing 737-900ER, registered N75435 (shown).

In October 2005, service to Asia was expanded as Continental introduced daily nonstop service between Newark and New Delhi, India. The success of this Newark-New Delhi route presaged establishment of a second gateway in India with the announcement of daily nonstop service to Mumbai. With the establishment of Mumbai service, Continental offered the most nonstop flights by any carrier from the United States to India. By May 2006, the carrier's passenger traffic surpassed that of Northwest Airlines, and Continental became the fourth-largest U.S. carrier. The Wall Street Journal reported on December 12, 2007, that Continental was in merger discussions with United Airlines. Of issue would be Continental's golden share held by Northwest Airlines and the divestiture of Continental's Guamanian hub. A deal was not "certain or imminent", with the talks being of a preliminary nature. In April 2008, at the height of oil prices, Northwest announced a merger with Delta Air Lines. This allowed Continental to buy back the golden share from Northwest Airlines, which it did. Continental then renewed merger talks with United Airlines, but broke them off again that same month.

In May 2008, Continental Airlines sold its remaining 4.38 million share investment in Panamanian flag carrier Copa for $35.75 a share, netting proceeds of $149.8 million. Continental had been a principal shareholder in Copa. In June 2008, due to national and international economic conditions, Continental cut 3,000 jobs and the CEO and president had reduced salaries for the remainder of the year. The airline also reduced capacity and eliminated 67 mainline aircraft from its fleet by the end of 2009, retiring all of Continental's 737-300s and all but 35 of its 737-500s. Continental also announced that it planned to withdraw from SkyTeam and would join Star Alliance in order to cooperate more extensively with United Airlines and other Star Alliance airlines. The new Continental-United relationship was characterized as a "virtual merger" in some circles.

In September 2008, Continental announced that it would commence providing seasonal non-stop service between Houston and Rio de Janeiro. The new nonstop flight was timed to provide roundtrip flight connections at Continental's Houston hub to more than 160 cities throughout the U.S., Canada, Central America, Europe, and Asia. Continental renewed its lease for around 450,000 square feet (42,000 m^{2}) in Continental Center I. Continental announced that its fourth quarter 2008 net loss widened to $266 million on costs for pilot retirement and reducing the value of its fuel hedges. In January 2009, Continental became the first commercial carrier to successfully demonstrate the use of sustainable biofuel to power an aircraft in North America. During the demonstration flight, Continental's test pilots successfully conducted a number of flight maneuvers, and the biofuel met all performance requirements as compared with traditional jet fuel. The biofuel blend included components derived from algae and jatropha plants, both sustainable, second-generation sources that do not impact food crops or water resources or contribute to deforestation. In March 2009, Continental became the first U.S. carrier to inaugurate scheduled service between New York and Shanghai, China, with daily nonstop flights from Newark.

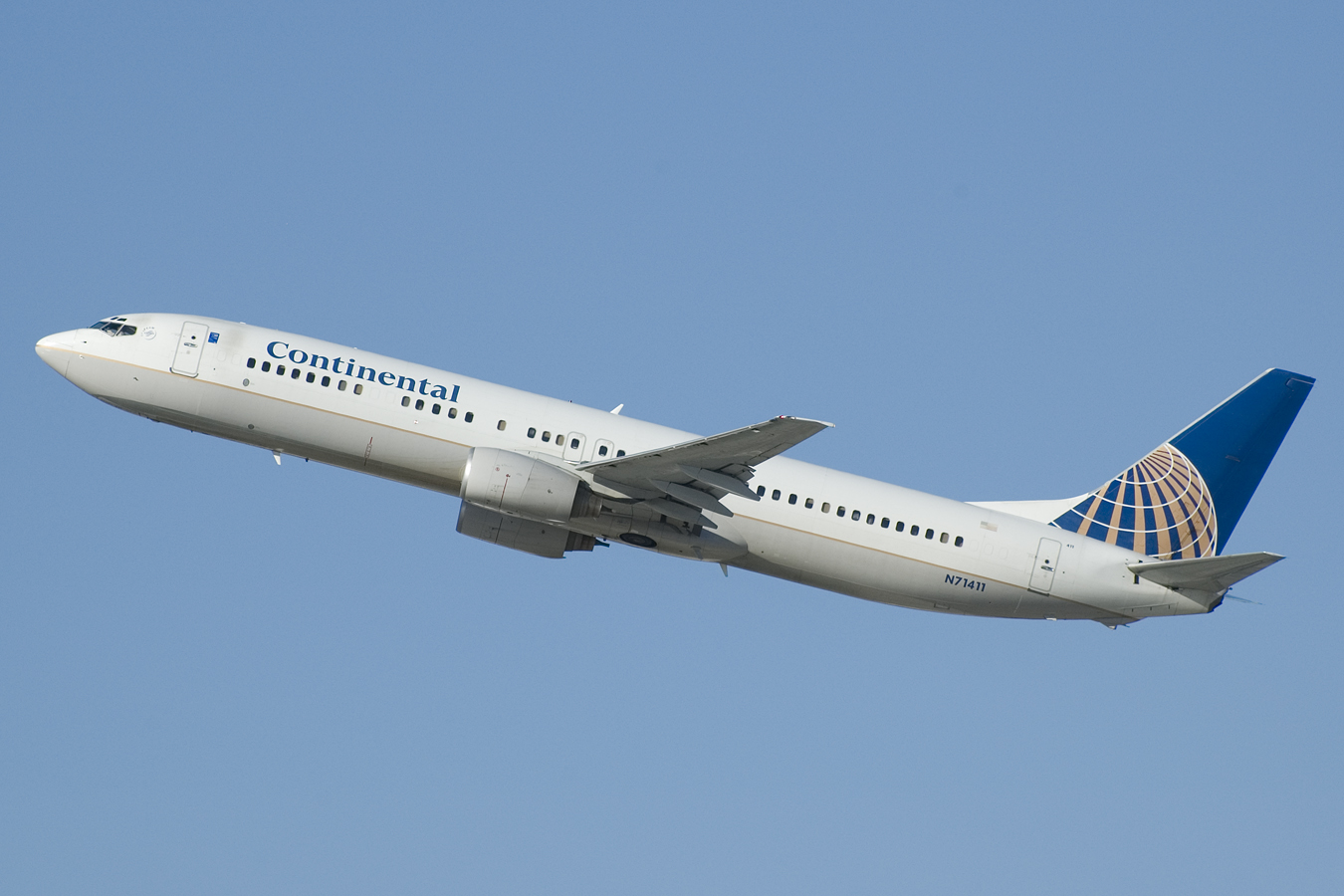
Continental Boeing 737-900 (N71411) after takeoff at Los Angeles International Airport in January 2007

In June 2009, Continental Airlines took delivery of another new Boeing 737-900ER, which was painted with a retro livery to commemorate the airline's 75th anniversary. The livery, which was originally used on aircraft beginning in 1947 and is called The Blue Skyway, was selected by Continental employees. Continental flew the aircraft to its three hubs for anniversary celebration events for employees and retirees. Post-merger, United maintained the livery, but on a different 737-900ER than the aircraft originally carrying it. In July 2009 Continental began to offer DirecTV, giving customers the choice of 95 channels of live television programming, more channels than any other carrier. Continental also launched Virtual Expert technology on their website at continental.com, offering customers 24-hour support on the Web for all their travel needs. Continental was the first airline to use this technology.

On January 1, 2010, Jeff Smisek, former president and COO, became the CEO of Continental Airlines. Continental also planned to start seasonal nonstop service between Portland International Airport (PDX) and Ted Stevens International Airport (ANC), putting Continental in direct competition with former partner Alaska Airlines. The route was scheduled to start on June 10, 2010. On February 16, Continental, along with its wholly owned subsidiary Continental Micronesia, announced that it applied for nonstop flights to Tokyo-Haneda as part of an open-skies agreement between the US and Japan. Continental planned to begin services to Tokyo-Haneda from its New York/Newark hub in late October 2010, and Continental Micronesia planned to start service to Haneda Airport from its Guam hub. However, Haneda slots were awarded to American, Delta, and Hawaiian Airlines instead. Continental Airlines became the first airline to launch a mobile boarding pass service to London's Heathrow. The service allowed customers to receive boarding passes electronically on their mobile phones or PDAs. Continental Airlines left the SkyTeam alliance on October 24, 2009, and joined Star Alliance on October 27, 2009.

==== Merger with United Airlines (2010) ====
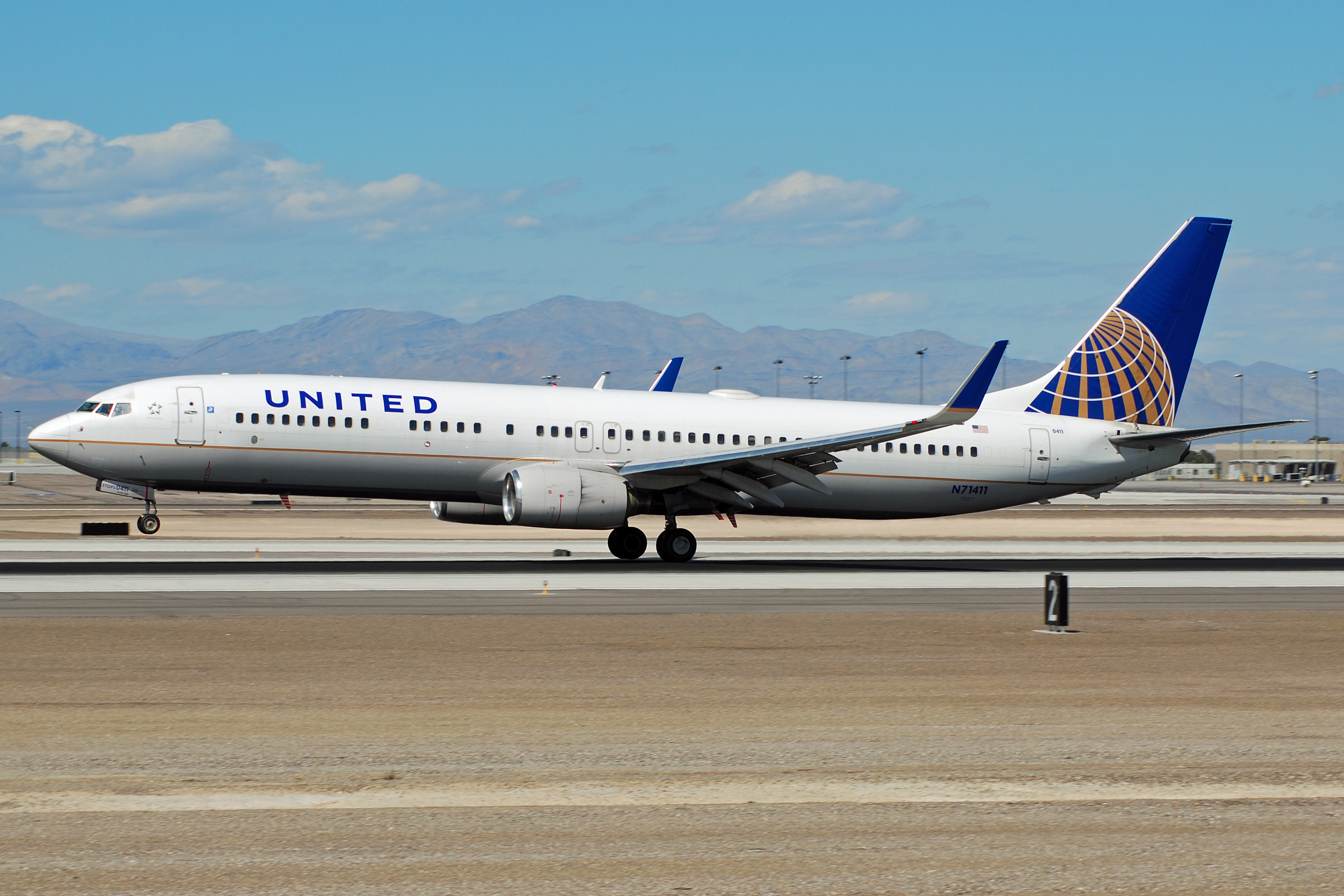
The same Boeing 737-900 (N71411) at McCarran International Airport in March 2011. The new livery after the merger between United and Continental in 2010 retains the Continental brand theme, but with the Continental replaced by United. 2011 was the first full year (second year altogether) with the post-merger combination of the two carriers.

In February 2008, United Airlines and Continental Airlines began the advanced stages of merger talks and were expected to announce their decision in the immediate aftermath of a definitive merger agreement between rival Delta Air Lines and Northwest Airlines. The timing of the events was notable because Northwest's golden shares in Continental (that gave Northwest veto authority against any merger involving Continental) could be redeemed, freeing Continental to pursue a marriage with United. On April 27, 2008, Continental broke off merger negotiations with United and stated it was going to stand alone. Despite ending merger talks, Continental announced that it would join United in the Star Alliance.

United and US Airways were in advanced merger talks in late April 2008, following the announcement that Continental had broken off talks with United. In June 2008, the CEOs of both United and Continental signed an alliance pact that led to their eventual merger. The alliance was an agreement to link international networks and share technology and passenger perks. This agreement was termed a "virtual merger" as it included many of the benefits of a merger without the actual costs and restructuring involved. The alliance took effect about a year after Delta Air Lines and Northwest Airlines completed their merger, as that released Continental from the SkyTeam contract and allowed for the required nine-month notice. Additionally, Continental joined the Star Alliance, as Delta and Northwest merged.

United was reported to be in serious merger discussion with US Airways in early April 2010. A New York Times report indicated that a deal was close. Union consent was cited as a major hurdle for negotiators to clear. On April 22, 2010, United announced that it would not pursue a merger with US Airways.

On May 2, 2010, the boards of directors at Continental and United approved a stock-swap deal that would combine them into the world's largest airline in revenue passenger miles. The new airline would take on United's name, Continental's globe logo and be based in United's hometown of Chicago. The new United would be run by Continental's CEO, Jeff Smisek, along with United's CEO, Glenn Tilton, serving as non-executive chairman of the board. The deal received approval from US and European regulators in the summer of 2010. On August 11, 2010, Continental and United revealed a new logo that would be used. The shareholders of both airlines approved the deal on September 17, 2010. Both airlines had been reporting losses in the recession and expected the merger to generate savings of more than $1 billion a year. On October 1, 2010, UAL Corporation and Continental Airlines completed the planned merger and changed the name to United Continental Holdings.

Although the two airlines remained separate until the operational integration was completed by early-2012, as of that day both airlines were corporately controlled by the same leadership.

On December 22, 2010, Continental Airlines merged operating certificates with Continental Micronesia. All Continental Micronesia flights were then branded and operated by Continental Airlines. Both carriers began merging their operations in 2011. On March 22, 2011, UCH announced that they had plans to offer Wi-Fi Service on more than 200 domestic Boeing 737 and 757 aircraft. The airlines attained a single operating certificate from the FAA on November 30, 2011 as the carriers no longer operates as a separate airline. That day, all Continental flights began to use the "United" callsign in air traffic control communications which marked the end of Continental Airlines. Both carriers planned to begin merging operations in 2011 and were expected to receive a single operating certificate by 2012. Continental's air operator's certificate (AOC) was retained, while those of United and Continental Micronesia were surrendered. On the other hand, United's maintenance certificate remained while Continental's did not.

On June 27, 2019, United changed its parent company name from United Continental Holdings to United Airlines Holdings.

The new United is the world's largest airline in terms of fleet size. The combined airline houses a fleet of over 1,000 mainline aircraft that features a mixture of Airbus and Boeing aircraft: Airbus A319s, Airbus A320s, Airbus A321neos, Boeing 737s, Boeing 757s, Boeing 767s, Boeing 777s, and Boeing 787 Dreamliners with orders of Airbus A321XLRs and Airbus A350s.

At the time of the merger with United, Continental was the fourth-largest airline in the US based on passenger-miles flown and the fifth largest in total passengers carried. Continental operated flights to destinations throughout the U.S., Canada, Latin America, Europe, and the Asia-Pacific regions. Principal operations were from its four hubs at Newark Liberty International Airport, George Bush Intercontinental Airport (Houston), Cleveland Hopkins International Airport and Antonio B. Won Pat International Airport in Guam. Initially, the only Continental hubs to be rebranded were Cleveland Hopkins International Airport and Houston's George Bush Intercontinental Airport. The Newark hub began the rebranding process on October 19, 2011, with all United-operated ticket counters and gates rebranded in Phase One; Phase Two of rebranding at Newark began in early-2012 with Continental ticket counters and gates being rebranded.

On March 3, 2012, Continental's passenger reservation system and frequent flyer program was merged into United. The last Continental Airlines flight taking off was "Continental Flight 1267", flying from Phoenix to Cleveland, and arriving into the latter as "United Flight 1267".

United Airlines, Inc. merged into Continental Airlines, Inc., with Continental Airlines, Inc. being the surviving corporate entity and a wholly owned subsidiary of the UAL Corporation, on March 31, 2013. The name of Continental Airlines, Inc., was changed to United Airlines, Inc.

== Corporate identity ==
=== Branding ===
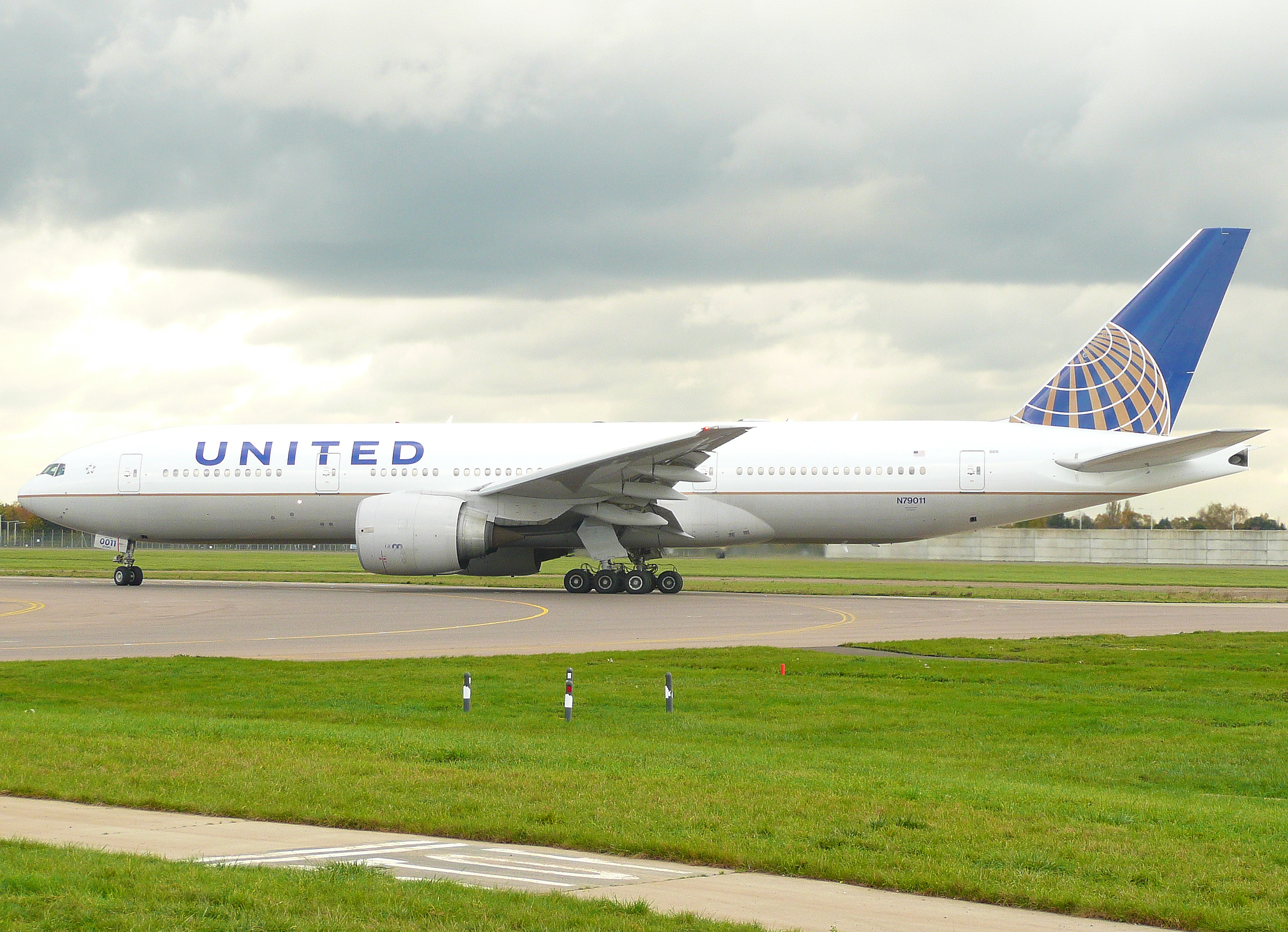
United 777-200ER in the (2010–2019) livery at London–Heathrow in November 2010

The designer Saul Bass designed the Continental "Jet Stream" logo in the late 1960s. In the 1990s, the design agency Lippincott introduced the globe logo. Before it merged, Continental's livery consisted of a white fuselage, with the globe in blue and gold, and a gray underside. The combined United Airlines adopted the pre-merger Continental Airlines livery and logo following the 2010 merger.

=== Slogans ===
- Work Hard. Fly Right. (1998–2012)
- More Airline for Your Money (mid-1990s)
- One Airline Can Make a Difference (early 1990s – introduced with the "Globe" livery)
- Working to Be Your Choice (1989)
- Up Where You Belong (1987)
- The Only Airline Worth Flying (1985)
- We Really Move Our Tail for You (1975–1979)
- If You Can't Fly Continental, Try to Have a Nice Trip Anyway (1970s)
- The Airline That Pride Built (1968)
- The Proud Bird with the Golden Tail (1967–1981)

== Company affairs ==
=== Headquarters ===
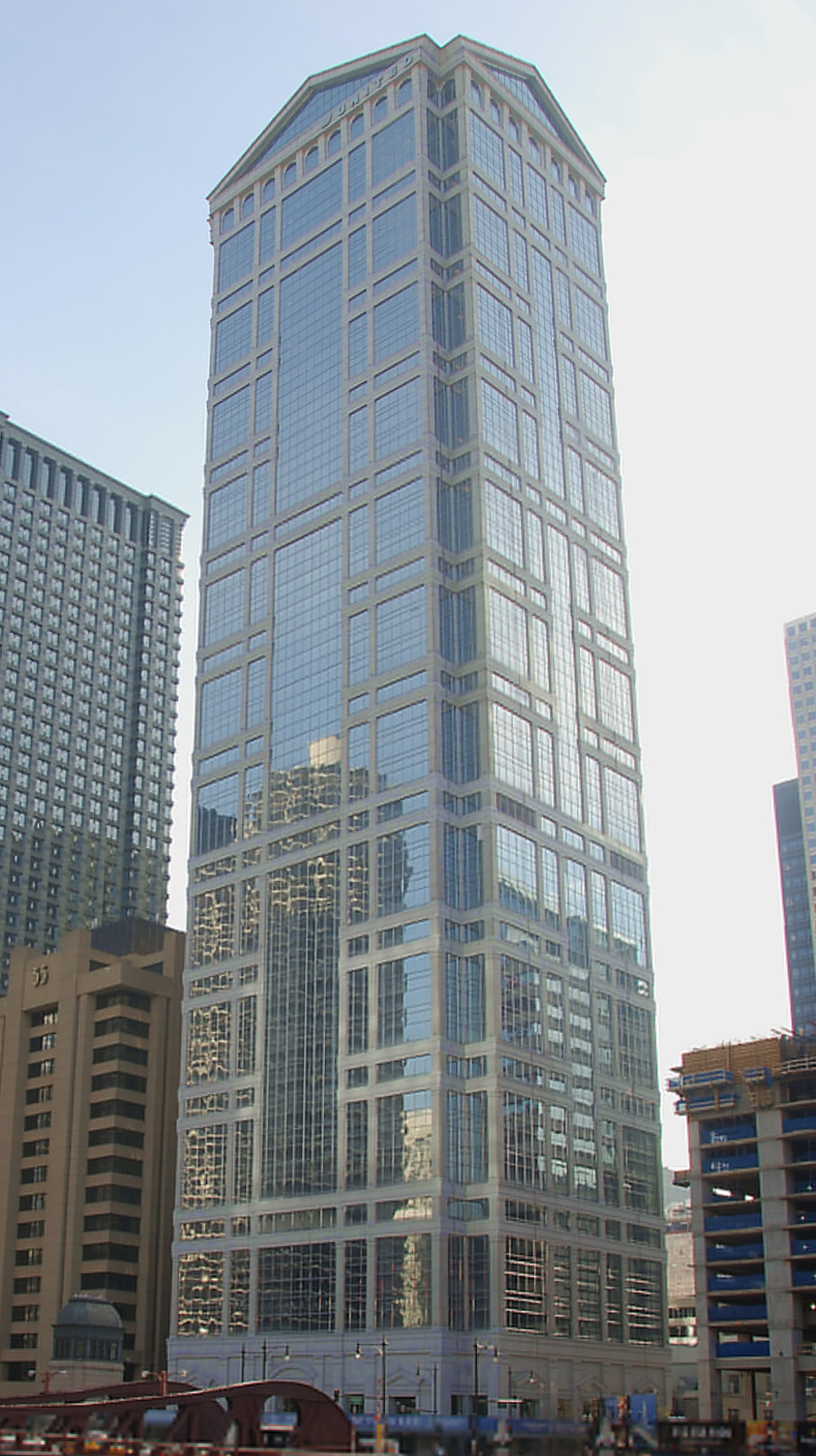
77 West Wacker Drive, the airline's final headquarters

On October 31, 1937, Continental moved its headquarters to Stapleton Airport in Denver, Colorado. Robert F. Six arranged to have the headquarters moved to Denver from El Paso, Texas, because Six believed that the airline should have its headquarters in a large city with a potential base of customers.

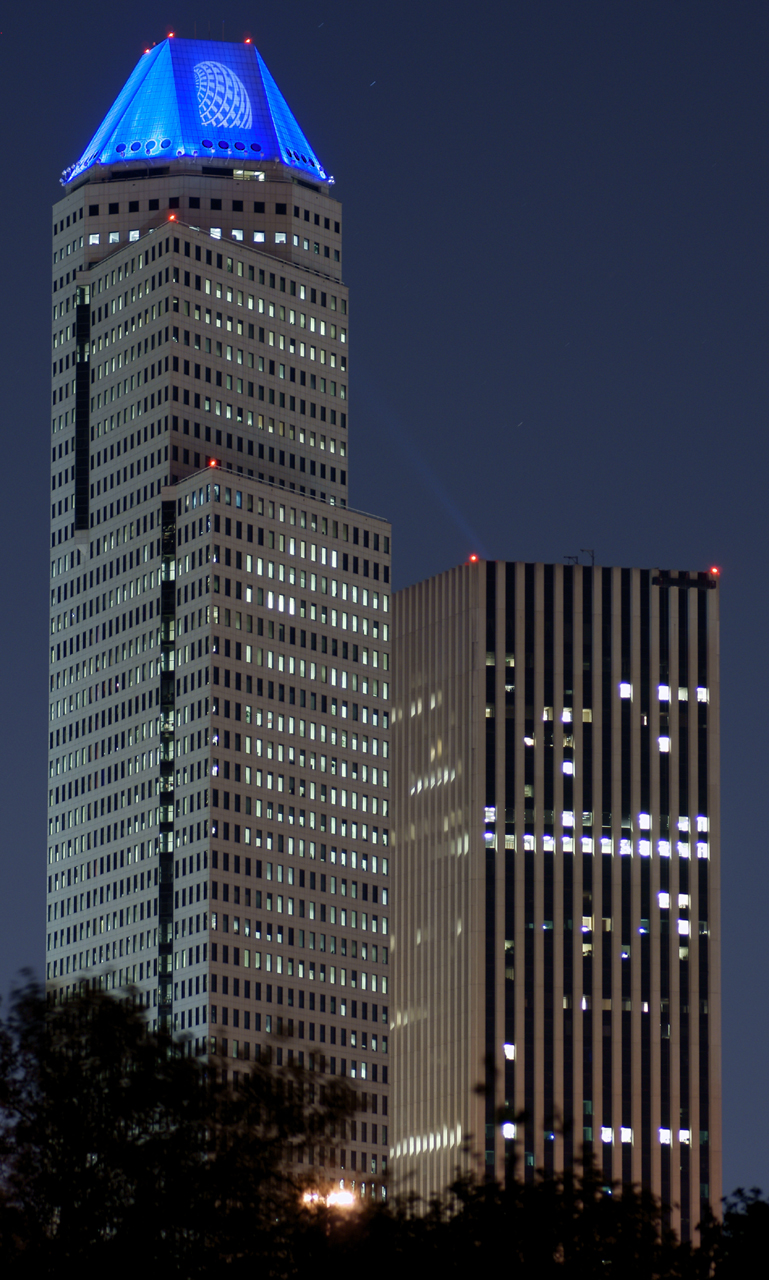
The Continental Center I in Houston, with the airline logo displayed, and the KBR Tower

At a 1962 press conference in the office of Mayor of Los Angeles Sam Yorty, Continental Airlines announced that it planned to move its headquarters to Los Angeles in July 1963. In 1963 Continental's headquarters moved to a two-story, $2.3 million building on the grounds of Los Angeles International Airport in Westchester, Los Angeles. The July 2009 Continental Magazine issue stated that the move "underlined Continental's western and Pacific orientation."

On July 1, 1983, the airline's headquarters were relocated to the America Tower in the Neartown area of Houston, and remained there until 1998. Stephen M. Wolf, the president of Continental said that the company moved its headquarters because Houston became the largest hub for Continental.

In January 1997, Continental occupied 250,000 square feet (23,000 m^{2}) of space at the America Tower. In addition it had 200,000 square feet (19,000 m^{2}) of office space in a building in proximity to George Bush Intercontinental Airport and 75,000 square feet (7,000 m^{2}) in a building located on Fuqua Road in Houston. The airline planned to move into a new headquarters site; originally it wanted a single site for its operations. In September 1997, the airline officially announced that it would consolidate its Houston headquarters in Continental Center I. The airline scheduled to move around 3,200 employees in stages beginning in July 1998 and ending in January 1999. The airline consolidated the headquarters operation at the America Tower and three other local operations into Continental Center I and Continental Center II in the Cullen Center. Bob Lanier, Mayor of Houston, said that he was "tickled to death" by the airline's move to relocate to Downtown Houston.

After the September 11 attacks and by September 2004 Continental laid off 24% of its clerical and management workers. Despite the reduction of the workforce, Continental did not announce any plans to sublease any of its space in Continental Center I and Continental Center II.

In 2008, Continental renewed its lease for around 450,000 square feet (42,000 m^{2}) in Continental Center I. Before the lease renewal, rumors spread stating that the airline would relocate its headquarters to office space around George Bush Intercontinental Airport due to high fuel costs affecting the airline industry; the rumors stated that the airline was studying possibilities of less expensive alternatives to Continental Center I. The parties did not reveal the terms of the lease agreement. In 2017, United Airlines consolidated its 1,600 Houston-area employees into a 225,000 square feet lease in the 609 Main at Texas building.

In 2010, Continental Airlines and United Airlines announced that they would merge and that the headquarters of the combined company would be in the Chicago Loop in Chicago. As of 2025, United Airlines headquarters are located at the Willis Tower in Chicago.

=== Environmental record ===
Continental Airlines made efforts to minimize the negative environmental effects of commercial aviation. For example, the carrier invested over $12 billion for the purchase of 270 fuel-efficient aircraft and related equipment that made up part of the airline's fleet. These efforts contributed to significant reductions of greenhouse gas and noise emissions. Continental Airlines was also one of the first carriers in the world to fit winglets to as much of its fleet as it could, reducing fuel burn by 3–5%.

The U.S. Environmental Protection Agency's "Design for the Environment" program recognized Continental in 2008 for use of a non-chromium aircraft surface pre-treatment that is environmentally compatible. Continental Airlines was the first carrier in the world to utilize this technology on their aircraft. The product, "PreKote", eliminates hazardous chemicals that are usually used in the pre-treatment phase before painting an aircraft. This technology provides improved environmental conditions for maintenance employees, while also reducing wastewater.

In 2009, Continental also became one of the first major U.S. carriers to participate in the U.S. Department of Energy's Commercial Aviation Alternative Fuels Initiative (CAAFI), contributing research data from its biofuel test flights to support the development of sustainable aviation fuel standards.

Continental Airlines conducted flight tests using aircraft powered by biofuel rather than traditional Jet-A1. On January 7, 2009, Continental partnered with GE Aviation to conduct a biofuel demonstration flight, making the airline the first U.S. carrier to conduct tests using biofuels. The test bed, a Boeing 737-800 (registered as N76516), ran one of its engines on a mix of 50% kerosene, 6% algae oil, and 44% oil from jatropha, a weed that bears oil producing seeds. The engine running partly on biofuel burned 46 kg (101 lb) less fuel than the conventional engine in 1 1/2 hours while producing more thrust using the same volume of fuel. Continental's CEO, Larry Kellner, commented "This is a good step forward, an opportunity to really make a difference to the environment" citing jatropha's 50–60% lower CO_{2} emissions as opposed to Jet-A1 in its lifecycle.

Continental Airlines was recognized by NASA and Fortune magazine for positive environmental contributions.

=== Awards ===
- No. 1 Most Admired Global Airline; Fortune Magazine (2004–2009)
- No. 1 Most Admired U.S. Airline; Fortune Magazine (2006–2007, 2010)
- No. 1 Greenest U.S. Airline; Greenopia (2009)
- No. 1 Pet-Friendly Airline; Petfinder (2009)
- Best Executive/Business Class; OAG Airline of the Year Awards (2003–2007, 2009)
- Best Airline Based in North America; OAG Airline of the Year Awards (2003–2009)
- Best U.S. Carrier Trans-Atlantic and Trans-Pacific Business Class; Condé Nast Traveler (1999–2006)
- Best Airline for North American Travel; Business Traveler Magazine (2006–2009)
- Best Large Domestic Airline (Premium Seating); Zagat Airline Survey(2008)
- Best Value for the Money (International); Zagat Airline Survey (2009)
- Highest-Ranked Network Airline; J.D. Power and Associates (2007)
- Airline of the Year; OAG (2004–2005)
- Business Leadership Recycling Award; American Forest & Paper Association (2010)

== Destinations ==
Continental, together with Continental Express and Continental Connection, offered more than 2,400 daily departures throughout the Americas, Europe and the Asia-Pacific region. The summer 2008 schedule saw Continental serving 130 domestic and 132 international destinations.

Continental Airlines operated primarily a hub-and-spoke route network with North American hubs in Cleveland, Houston, and Newark, and a west Pacific hub in Guam. The majority of Continental flights were operated from its hubs. Some affiliated airlines used the Continental Connection name also operate flights not involving hubs, such as Gulfstream International Airlines, which operated intra-Florida and Florida-Bahamas services.

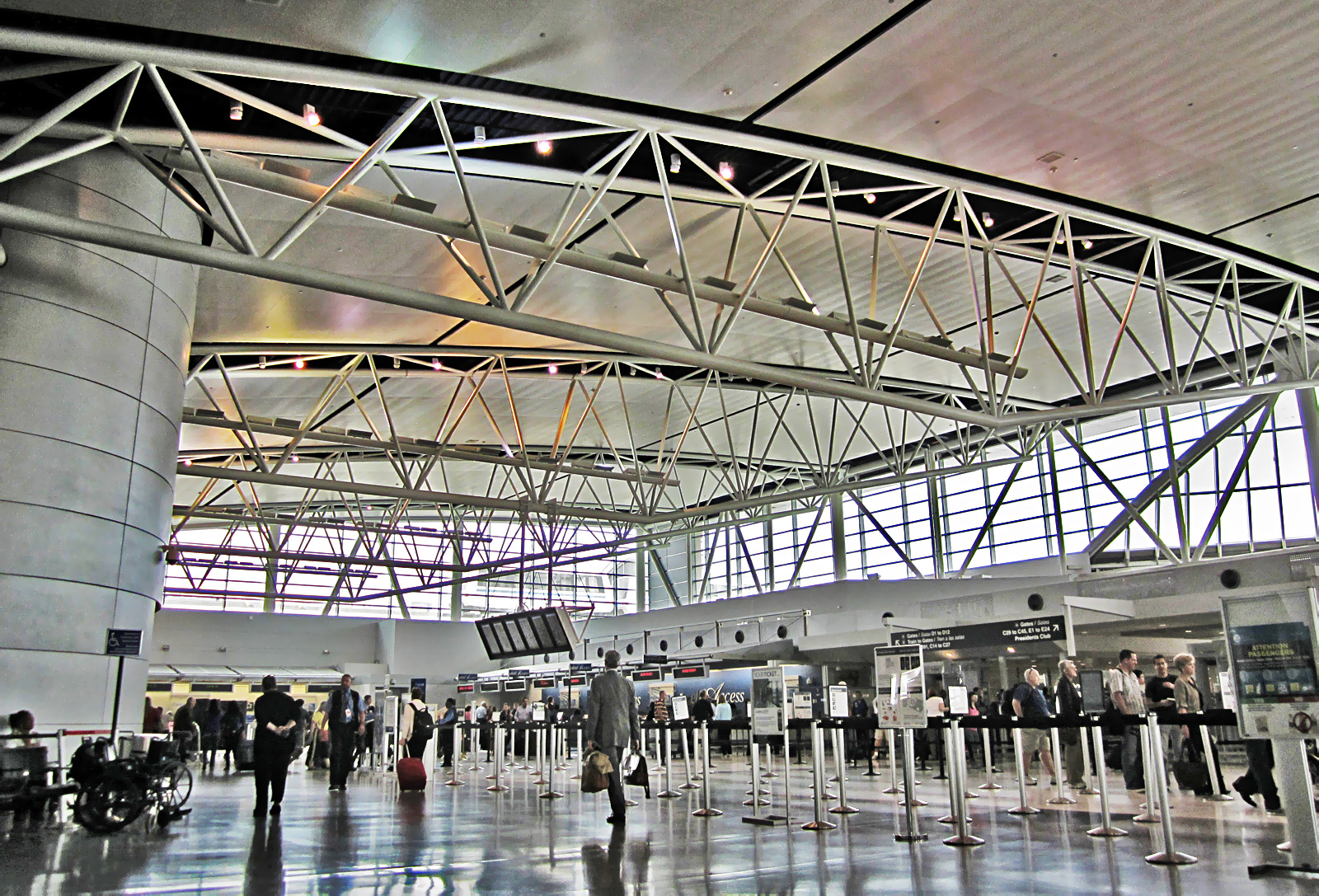
Continental was the dominant operator at Houston Intercontinental Airport

For almost 40 years, Continental operated a very large hub in Denver, Colorado, but took the decision to close that hub in 1995 immediately after the opening of Denver International Airport (DIA), which represented a significantly higher-cost operation than the former Stapleton Airport, which DIA had replaced. The abrupt nature of this change came as a shock to Denver, which was experiencing dramatic growth. The void left by Continental's departure allowed the establishment of the "new" Frontier Airlines (a startup, rather than the original carrier of that name). Both Frontier and Southwest Airlines (which entered the Denver market after Continental's dehubbing) expanded quickly to fill the vacuum created by Continental's closing of its Denver hub.

For the first forty years of its existence, Continental was a domestic airline; however, especially after the incorporation of Texas International routes, it served more Mexican destinations than any other U.S. carrier since the mid-1980s.

Continental first entered the transatlantic market in April 1985, with the introduction of a Houston-London-Gatwick service. Long prevented from serving London Heathrow Airport because of the provisions of the Bermuda II agreement, which only allowed British Airways, Virgin Atlantic, United Airlines and American Airlines to operate flights from Heathrow to the United States, Continental maintained its London services at Gatwick, where in 2007 as many as six flights a day were offered to Newark, Houston, and Cleveland.

In March 2008, an Open Skies Agreement between the U.S. and the European Union became effective, invalidating Bermuda II restrictions that had limited the number of carriers and cities in the U.S. that could serve London-Heathrow. In November 2007 Continental announced that new, nonstop, twice-daily service from its hubs at George Bush Intercontinental Airport and Newark Liberty International Airport to London-Heathrow would be offered; and this service was inaugurated on March 29, 2008. The service replaced existing frequencies to London-Gatwick and were offered with a combination of Boeing 777-200ER and 757-200 equipment, with flat beds guaranteed in the BusinessFirst cabin. By the time of its merger with United, Continental had grown its presence at London-Heathrow to seven daily flights; two to Houston-Intercontinental and five to Newark.

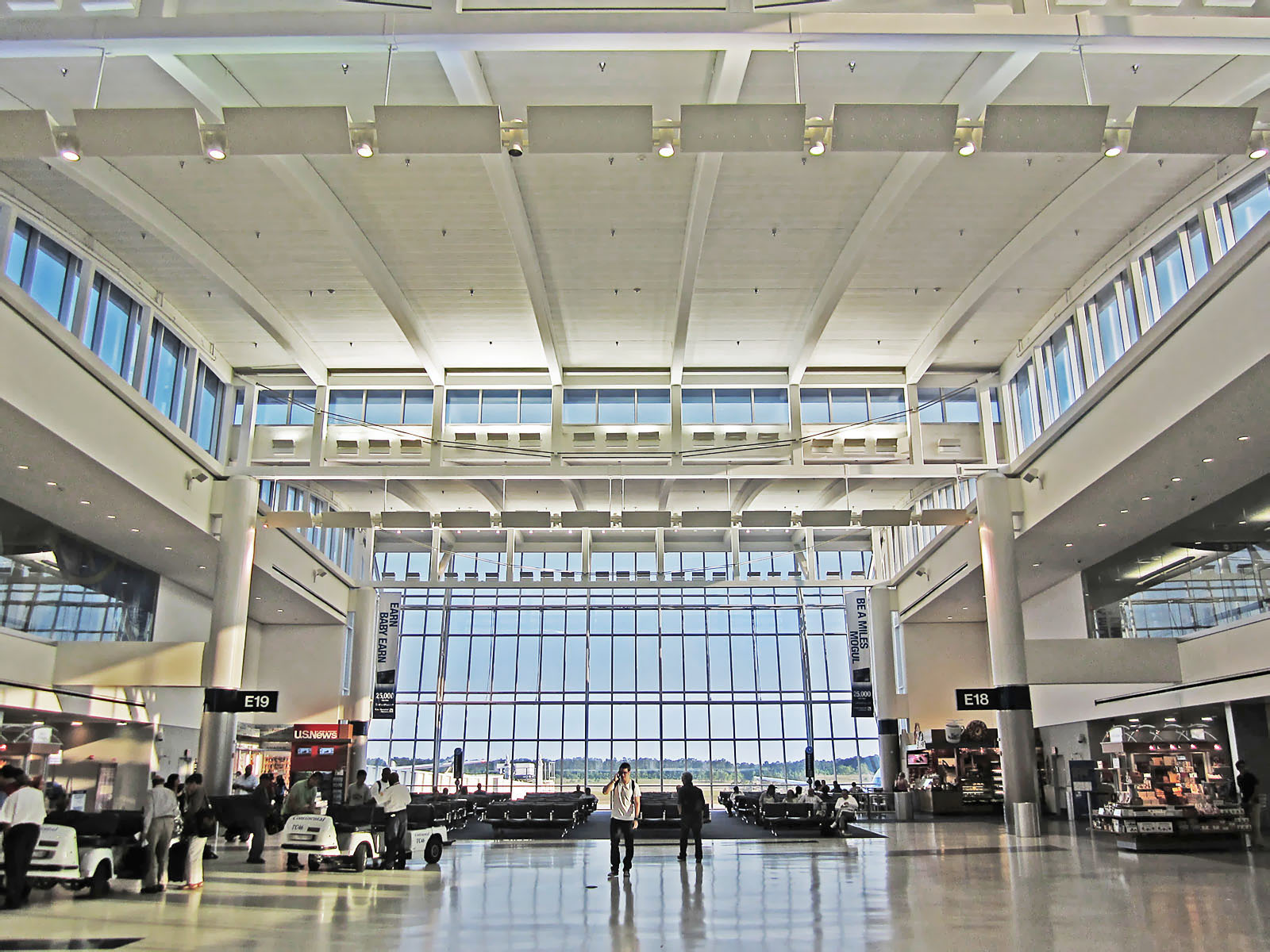
Continental operated international flights from Terminal E at George Bush Intercontinental Airport in Houston.

During the Vietnam War, Continental's extensive military charter operations established a presence in the Pacific region that formed the basis for the Air Micronesia operation. Service to Japan was initiated in the 1970s from Guam and Saipan, and by the late 1980s, nonstop service between Seattle and Tokyo was briefly offered with 747 equipment, soon to be replaced with a direct Honolulu-Tokyo (Narita) flight. Through the 1990s, Continental maintained a minimal presence in the long-haul trans-Pacific market, until the delivery of 777-200ERs in 1998 which saw the addition of nonstop Tokyo service from Houston and Newark. By 2007, Hong Kong and Beijing were added to the network, and in 2009 Shanghai was added, all from the Newark hub. Continental served Australia in the past with DC-10 and Boeing 747 service from Hawaii, with some flights via Auckland. Continental withdrew from much of the Australasian market, but continued Air Micronesia Boeing 737-800 services between Cairns and Guam on a 4x weekly basis. Beginning in June 2011, it initiated service to Hilo, Hawaii, providing that city the only nonstop air service to and from any destination outside the state of Hawaii.

Continental offered the most destinations of any of the U.S. carriers to Germany, India, Ireland, Japan, Mexico and the United Kingdom, and was the only U.S. airline that flew to the Federated States of Micronesia, Marshall Islands, and Norway. Continental began service from Newark to Mumbai, India on October 1, 2007, making that city Continental's second Indian destination.

=== Codeshare agreements ===
Throughout its existence, Continental Airlines had codeshare agreements with the following airlines:

- Aeromar
- Air France (ended with Continental's withdrawal from SkyTeam)
- Alaska Airlines
- Alitalia (ended with Continental's withdrawal from SkyTeam)
- America West Airlines (ended on May 1, 2002, citing low code-shared flight sales)
- Amtrak (Northeast Regional rail service to select destinations from the Newark Airport Rail Station, despite the fact Amtrak is not an airline)
- Avianca
- Cape Air
- China Southern Airlines (ended with Continental's withdrawal from SkyTeam)
- Copa Airlines
- Copa Airlines Colombia
- Czech Airlines (ended with Continental's withdrawal from SkyTeam)
- Delta Air Lines (ended with Continental's withdrawal from SkyTeam)
- EVA Air
- Hawaiian Airlines
- Horizon Air
- Island Air
- KLM (ended with Continental's withdrawal from SkyTeam)
- Korean Air (ended with Continental's withdrawal from SkyTeam)
- Northwest Airlines (ended with Continental's withdrawal from SkyTeam)
- Spanair (ended with Spanair's collapse in January 2012)
- TACA Airlines
- United Airlines (Merger partner)
- US Airways
- Virgin Atlantic

=== Regional operators ===
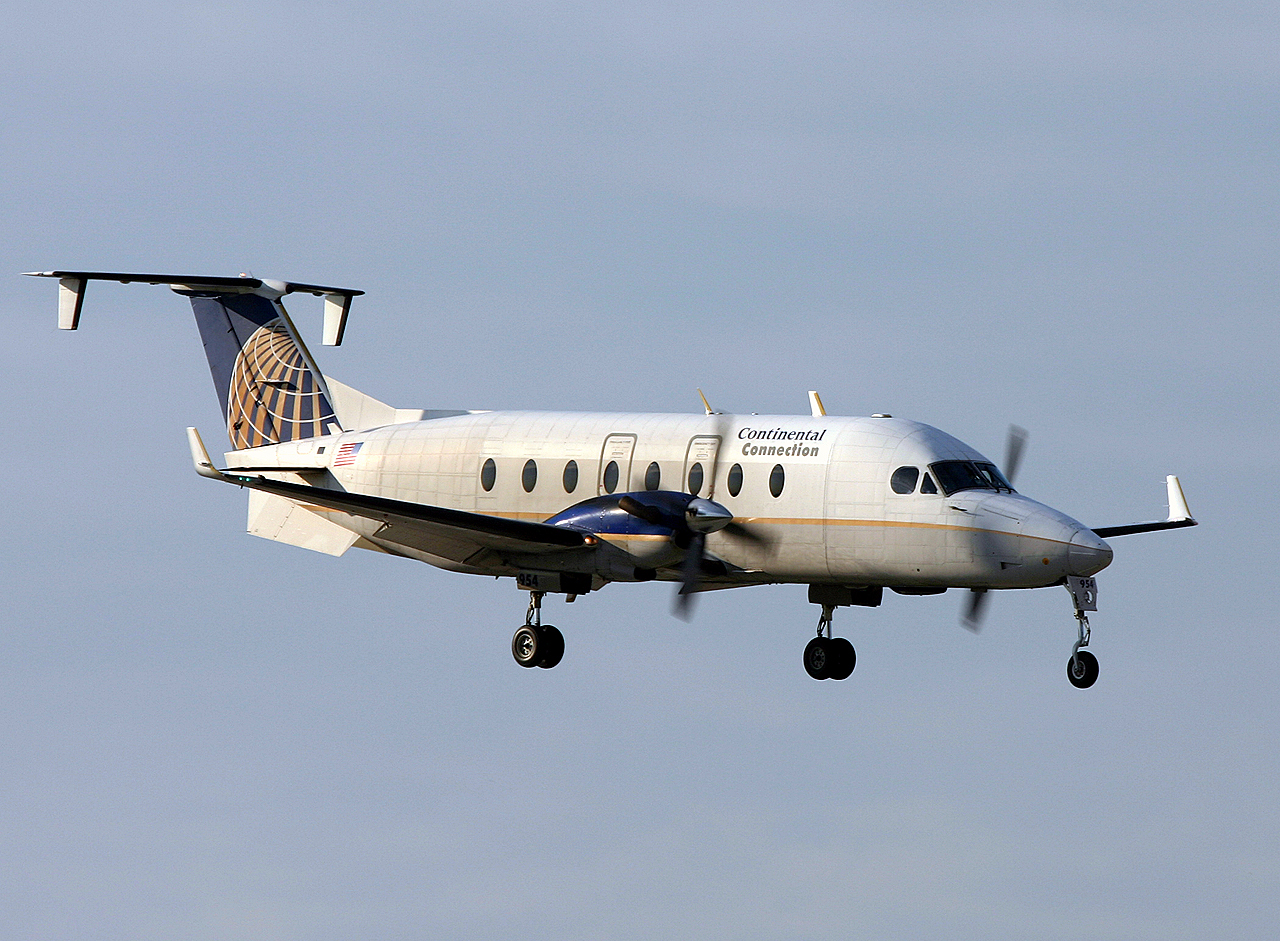
Continental Connection Beechcraft 1900

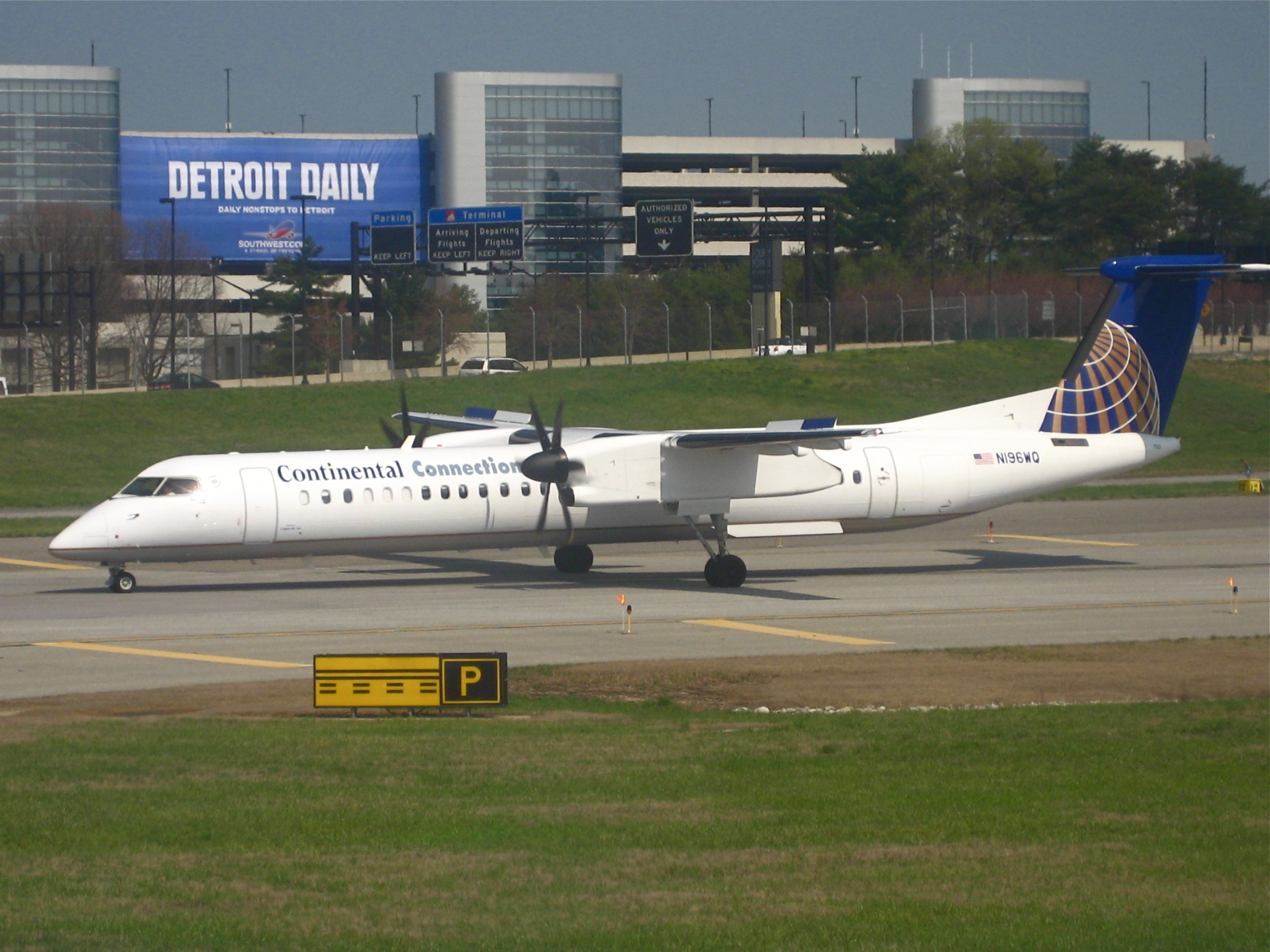
A Continental Connection Bombardier Q400

Continental was a minority owner of ExpressJet, which operated under the "Continental Express" trade name but was a separately managed and public company. Chautauqua Airlines also flew under the Continental Express identity, while Cape Air, Colgan Air, CommutAir, and Silver Airways fed Continental's flights under the Continental Connection identity. Continental did not have any ownership interests in these companies.

The operators of Continental Connection were:

- Cape Air operated out of San Juan (SJU), Puerto Rico, to other Puerto Rican destinations, the U.S. and British Virgin Islands, Anguilla and Nevis. It also serviced routes from Guam to Saipan, Saipan to Rota and Rota to Guam.
- Colgan Air operated out of Cleveland, Houston and Newark as a subsidiary of Pinnacle Airlines Corp.
- CommutAir operated mostly from Continental's Cleveland and Newark hubs.
- Gulfstream International Airlines operated in the Bahamas, Miami, Ft. Lauderdale, Orlando, Tampa, West Palm Beach, Tallahassee, Pensacola, and Key West. Also operated some flights under the Essential Air Service program from Continental's Cleveland hub.
- Silver Airways

== Fleet ==
Continental's all-Boeing fleet consisted of four types (737, 757, 767, and 777) in ten variants, with two variants of the Boeing 787 Dreamliner scheduled to enter service in 2011. The company's daily aircraft utilization was usually at the top of the industry.

As of 1 October 2010, at the time of the merger, the Continental Airlines fleet consisted of the following aircraft with an average age of 9.5 years:

Continental Airlines fleet in 2012
Aircraft	In service	Orders	Passengers				Notes
Aircraft	In service	Orders	J	F	Y	Total	Notes
Boeing 737-500	36	—	—	8	106	114	All were transferred to United Airlines and later retired in 2013.
Boeing 737-700	36	—	—	12	112	124	All were transferred to United Airlines.
Boeing 737-800	126	4	—	14	141	155	All fleet and remaining orders transferred to United Airlines.
Boeing 737-800	126	4	—	16	144	160	All fleet and remaining orders transferred to United Airlines.
Boeing 737-900	12	—	—	20	153	173	All were transferred to United Airlines.
Boeing 737-900ER	30	22	—	20	153	173	All fleet and remaining orders transferred to United Airlines.
Boeing 757-200	41	—	16	—	159	175	All were transferred to United Airlines.
Boeing 757-300	21	—	—	24	192	216	Largest operator. All were transferred to United Airlines.
Boeing 767-200ER	10	—	25	—	149	174	All were transferred to United Airlines and later retired in 2013.
Boeing 767-400ER	12	—	35	—	200	235	All were transferred to United Airlines.
Boeing 767-400ER	4	—	20	—	236	256	All were transferred to United Airlines.
Boeing 777-200ER	22	—	50	—	226	276	All were transferred to United Airlines.
Boeing 787-8	—	11	N/A				All orders were transferred to United Airlines.
Boeing 787-9	—	14	N/A				All orders were transferred to United Airlines.
Total	350	51					

By 2013, all of the former Continental fleet, excluding the Boeing 737-500 and Boeing 767-200ER (which were sold, primarily to Russian operators) were repainted in the new United livery making them officially part of the United Airlines Fleet, except for the one Boeing 737-900ER in the Continental Blue Skyway retro livery (N75436). United repainted this aircraft to the standard Globe livery in May 2016, and then painted a different airframe in the Blue Skyway, sister ship N75435. The reason for the change is currently unknown to the public.

First Class was offered on Domestic Flights, and BusinessFirst was offered on Transatlantic/Transpacific Flights.

Continental Airlines was one of three carriers (with American Airlines and Delta Air Lines) to sign an exclusivity agreement with Boeing in the late 1990s. When Boeing acquired McDonnell Douglas, the European Union forced Boeing to void the contracts. Both parties had been adhering to the terms under a gentlemen's agreement.

Continental was one of the first major airlines to fly Boeing 757s on transatlantic routes. There have been some instances of range limitations on west-bound transatlantic flights due to strong headwinds resulting in a fuel stop which does not appear on the timetable, but these stops are not common. The use of the 757 with its smaller seating capacity allowed for "thin" routes (routes with less passenger traffic) to be economically viable. It allowed nonstop service from smaller cities, such as Belfast, Northern Ireland and Hamburg, Germany to the New York gateway. Previously, customers originating at these and similar cities needed to connect at European gateways like London Heathrow, Paris Charles de Gaulle, or Frankfurt, in order to travel to New York. United retains a number of these flight routes, mostly based out of Newark, including Newark-Dublin and Newark-Berlin.

=== Fleet in 1960, 1970, and 1980 ===
CAL, March 1960
Aircraft	Total	Orders	Notes
Boeing 707-120	4	1	
Douglas DC-3	10	0	
Douglas DC-6	1	0	Leased
Douglas DC-6B	2	0	1 leased
Douglas DC-7B	5	0	
Vickers Viscount 812	15		
Total	37	1	

CAL, March 1970
Aircraft	Total	Orders	Notes
Concorde (SST)	0	3	Not delivered
Boeing 2707 (SST)	0	3	Not manufactured
Boeing 707-320C	13	0	
Boeing 720B	8	0	
Boeing 727-100C	1	0	
Boeing 727-200	12	0	
Boeing 747-100	0	4	
Douglas DC-9-10F	19	0	
Total	62	10	

CAL, July 1980
Aircraft	Total	Orders	Notes
Boeing 727-100	16	0	
Boeing 727-200	36	9	
Douglas DC-10-10	7	0	
Douglas DC-10-10CF	6	0	
Douglas DC-10-30	0	2	
Total	65	11	

=== Cabin ===
Continental Airlines had two classes of service, First/Business and Economy, for aircraft in the mainline fleet.

==== BusinessFirst ====
BusinessFirst was Continental's international business class product. It was offered on all Boeing 757-200s, Boeing 767s, and Boeing 777-200ERs. Continental had begun deploying BusinessFirst seats that allowed customers to lie completely flat, reclining 180-degrees and providing 6 1/2 feet (2.0 m) of sleeping space in the fully extended position on its 777-200ER and 757-200 aircraft. The Flat Bed Seat offered a seat measuring up to 25 inches (640 mm) wide when the adjustable armrest was positioned flush with the seat cushion. Electronic controls enabled customers to easily move the seats to an infinite combination of seat adjustments, including lumbar support, leg and foot rests. iPod connectivity was available in the Flat Bed Seat. The new BusinessFirst seats had a six-way adjustable head rest, an individual overhead reading light and an adjustable seat light allowing customers to read in bed without disturbing their neighbor and a privacy shell that allowed for seclusion from other travelers. BusinessFirst customers also received one of the highest crew to passenger ratios (1:8) among all international business class products.

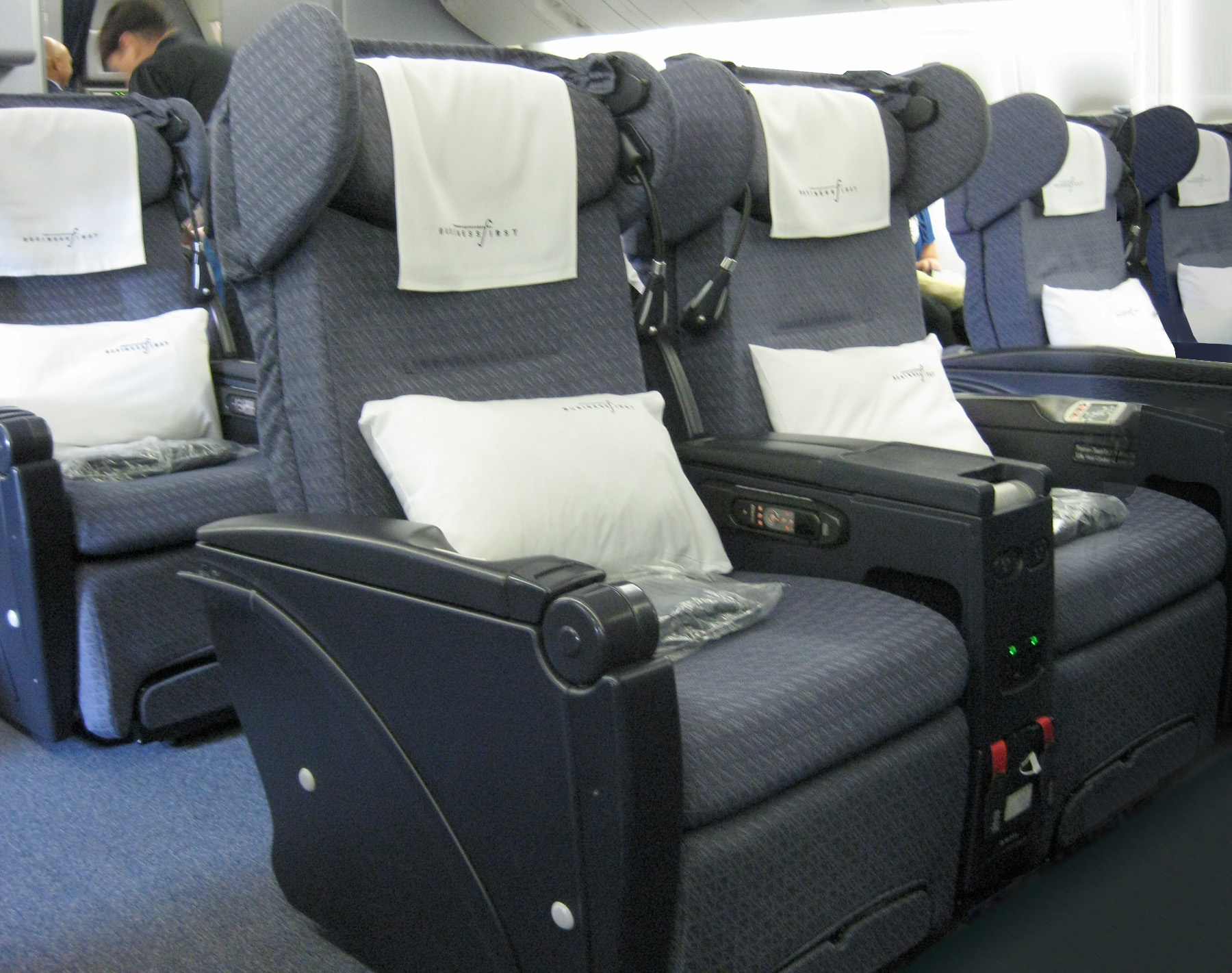
Previous generation 777 BusinessFirst seats, Replaced in 2010

The new BusinessFirst seats were featured on all of Continental's 777-200ERs and 757-200s. Installation on the Boeing 767 fleet was to follow in 2011. The anticipated completion of the roll-out across Continental's entire international fleet was planned for August 2012. In addition, all 787 deliveries were to have the seats installed.

Continental considered BusinessFirst to be its signature onboard product, and the service is a frequent subject of advertising campaigns. Customers seated in the BusinessFirst cabin on longhaul flights from the United States to Europe, Asia, select cities in South America, and the Middle East received special ground services, including EliteAccess priority bag service at check-in, expedited security screening (where available), access to Continental's Presidents Club or affiliated Star Alliance lounges, personalized Continental Concierge service, and dedicated boarding procedures.

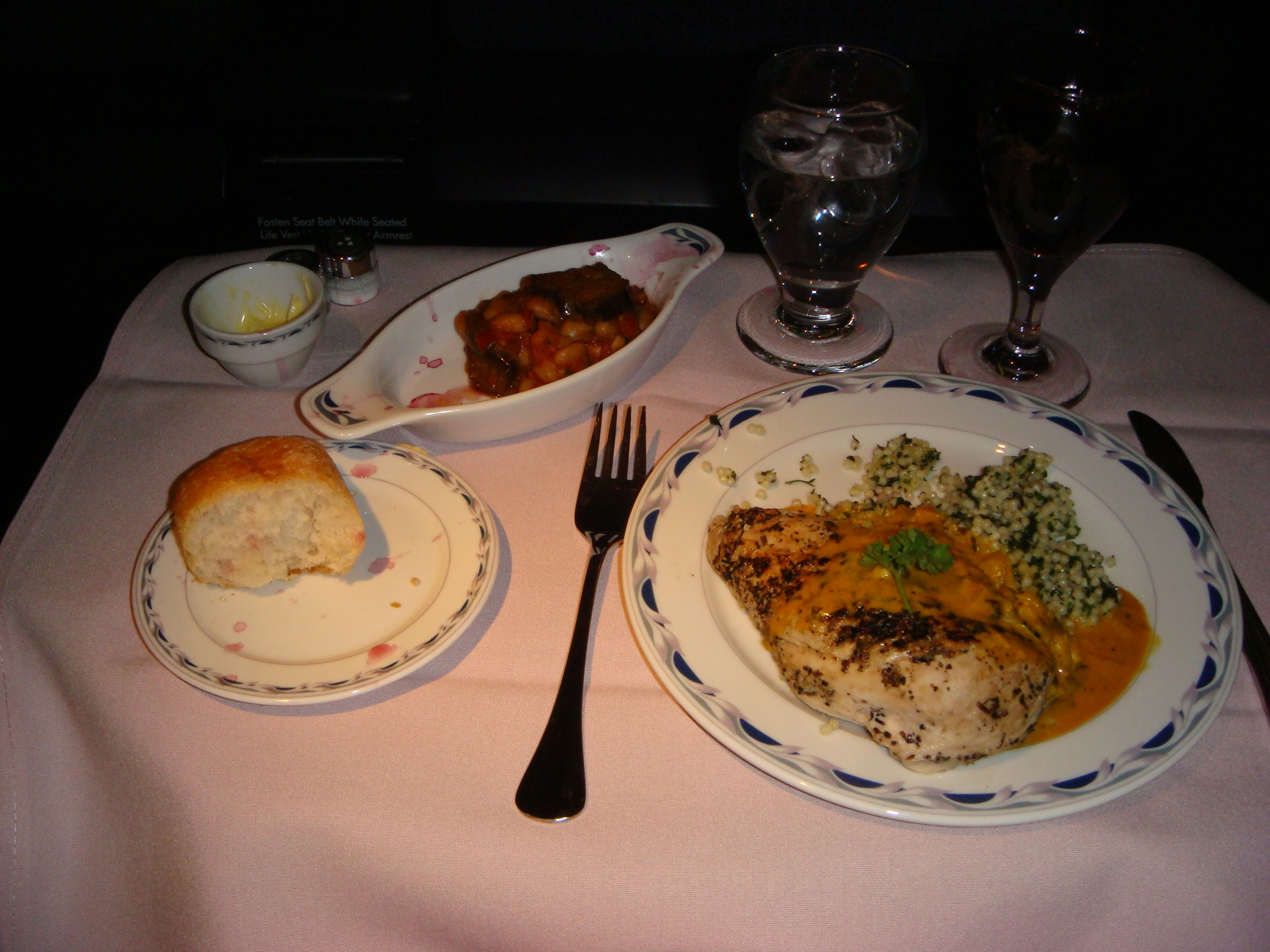
In-flight meal in BusinessFirst

On board, multi-course meals were designed by Continental's Congress of Chefs, beverages were selected by Continental's Wine Masters, and service was provided by flight attendants from separate International crew bases at Newark and Houston. Most flights had at least two meal services. Entertainment was offered at each individual seat, and passengers on Boeing 777 and 757 aircraft had access to a new Audio-Video On Demand system with touch-screen controls. 767 aircraft featured older, looped-video multi-channel entertainment systems, generally with a wider programming selection than Economy Class. 767 aircraft were expected to receive AVOD in the near future. Customers also were provided headphones, a large pillow, wool blanket, and amenity kit prior to departure. Upon arrival, BusinessFirst customers have access to shower facilities and arrival lounges at most airports.

Continental offered a modified BusinessFirst service on flights from the United States mainland to Hawaii. All flights offered the same suite of EliteAccess ground services, along with a similar main meal service on board. Amenities such as pillows and headsets also were the same, but no amenity kits were offered. On flights from Newark and Houston to Honolulu, Continental operated Boeing 767-400ER aircraft with typical recliner-style BusinessFirst seats. On flights from Los Angeles and Orange County to Honolulu/Kahului with Boeing 737 equipment, domestic First Class seats were substituted. Nonstop flights from Guam to Honolulu were exempt from most of these modifications and more closely resembled the standard BusinessFirst service.

No complimentary upgrades were offered to Continental OnePass Elite members on any intercontinental flights offering BusinessFirst service. However, on 767-operated BusinessFirst services to Hawaii, Continental offered a day-of-departure buy up fee for any revenue coach class fare, provided seats were available. Mainland-Hawaii was the only BusinessFirst market where such upgrades are available. In addition, OnePass Elites were eligible for complimentary automatic upgrades on Continental-operated flights from California to Hawaii.

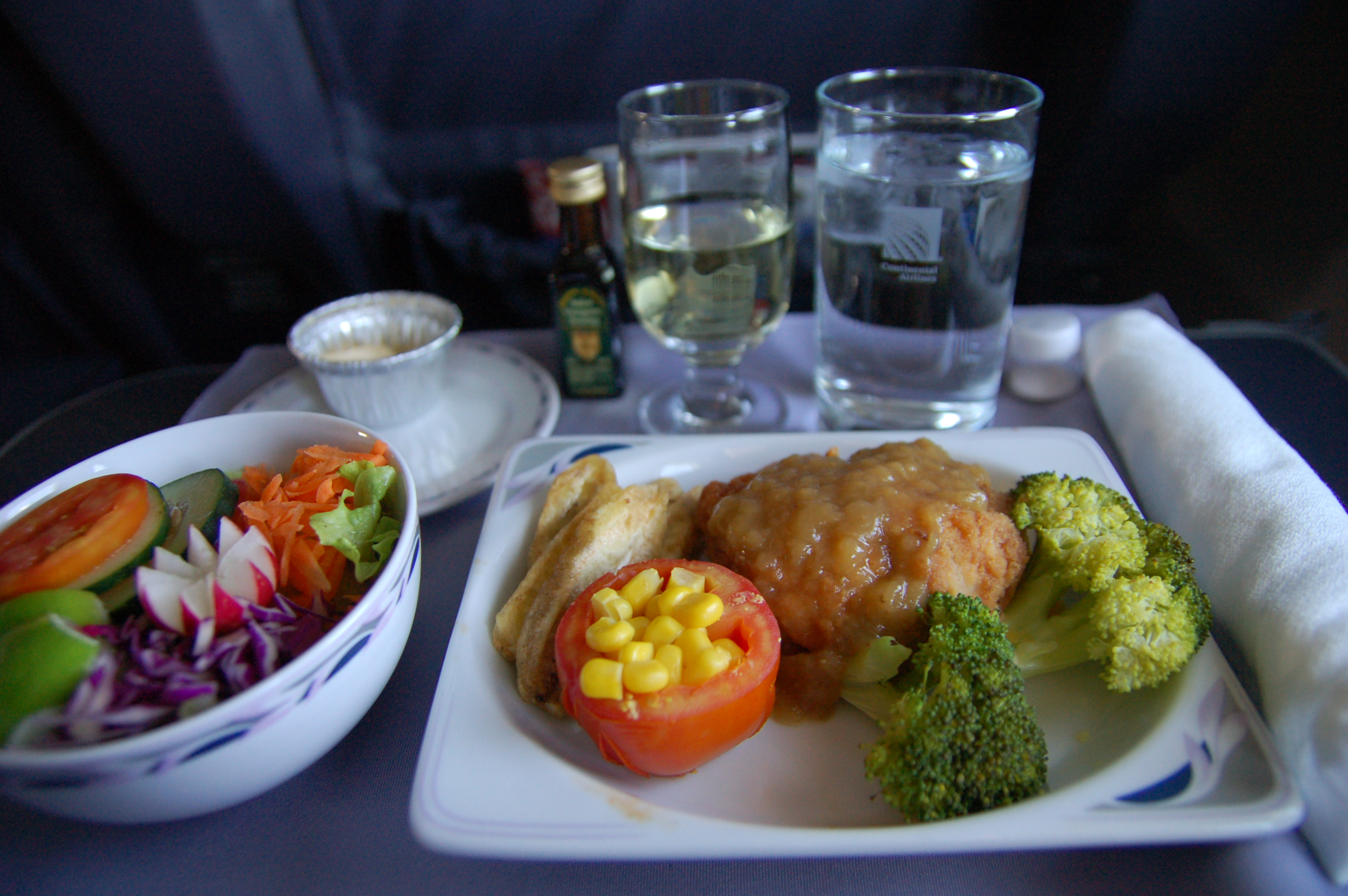
Domestic First Class dinner

==== Domestic First Class ====
First Class was offered on all domestically configured aircraft. It was offered on all Boeing 737s and Boeing 757-300s. Seats range from 20.75 to 21 inches (530 mm) wide, and had between 37 and 38 inches (970 mm) of pitch. Passengers aboard this class received free meals, refreshments, and alcoholic beverages. Passengers could watch movies on overhead television screens located throughout the cabin. In 2009, Continental began to add LiveTV television and Wi-Fi services to all next-generation Boeing 737s and Boeing 757-300s which was free of charge to First Class customers.

On international flights to Latin America, the Caribbean, and select cities in South America, Continental's Domestic First Class service was re-branded as Regional Business Class. These customers received access to Continental's Presidents Club and affiliated Star Alliance lounges on day-of-departure. Also, meal choices were frequently substituted to reflect the local cuisine of destinations served, especially on flights to Latin America.

==== International Economy Class ====
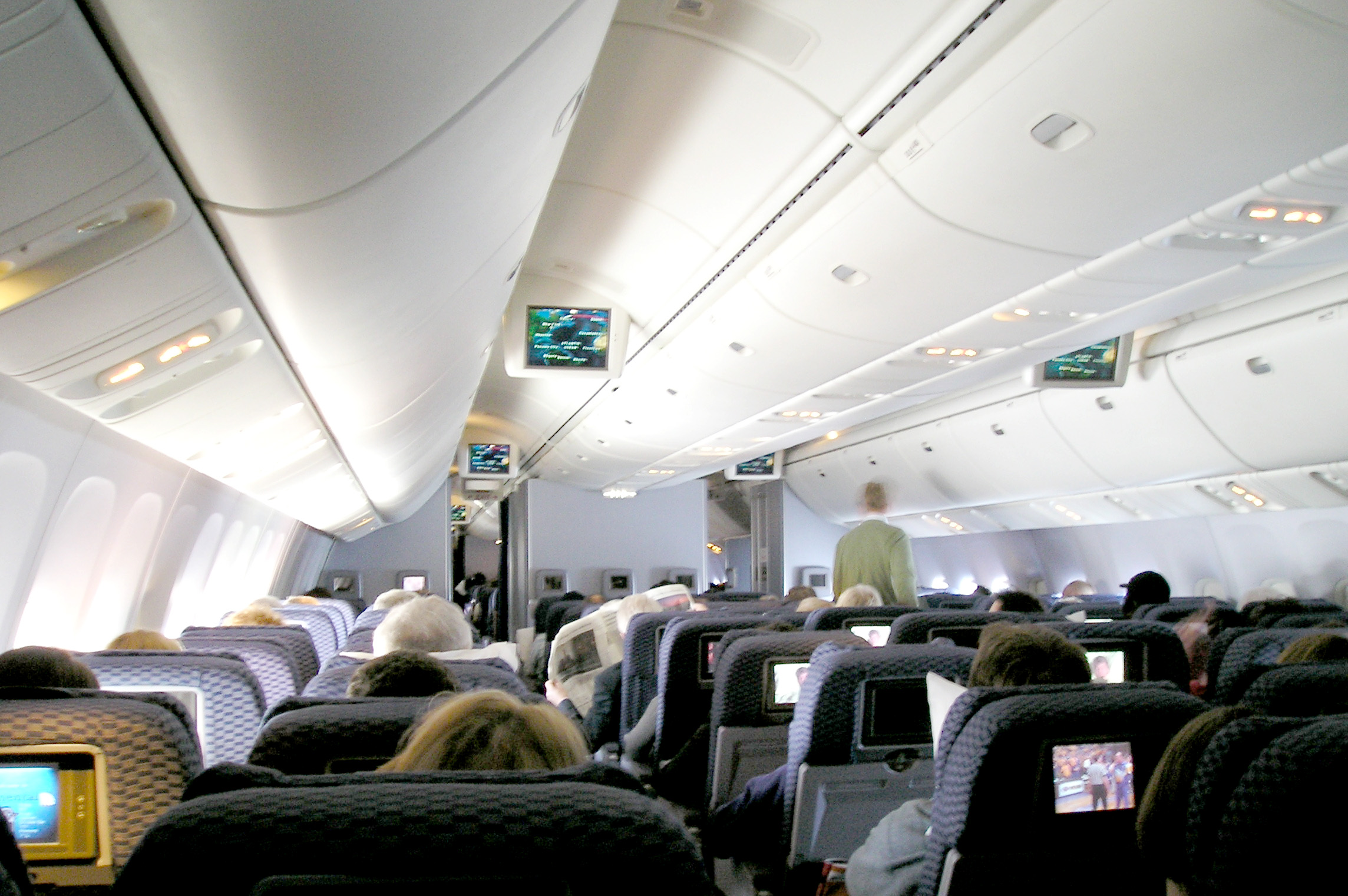
767-400ER economy cabin

Economy Class was offered on all internationally configured aircraft. Seats range from 17.2 to 17.9 inches (450 mm) wide, and have between 31 and 32 inches (810 mm) of pitch. Passengers aboard this class received free meals, snacks, and non-alcoholic beverages; alcoholic beverages could be purchased for US$6 per drink or one Continental Currency coupon per drink. All seats on 757 and 777 equipment were fitted with AVOD touch screen with a wide-ranging selection of films, games, television shows and music.

==== Domestic Economy Class ====
Economy Class was offered on all domestically configured aircraft. Seats were 17.2 inches (440 mm) wide, and had between 31 and 32 inches (810 mm) of pitch. Passengers aboard this class received free non-alcoholic refreshments. Alcoholic beverages could be purchased on board. Passengers on all Boeing 737-700, −800, −900, −900ER, and 757-300 aircraft could watch movies on overhead television screens located throughout the cabin, with headsets available at a charge. In January 2009, Continental began to add LiveTV television services to all next-generation Boeing 737s and Boeing 757-300s. LiveTV would be chargeable for Economy Class customers. Continental Airlines offered free meals on domestic economy class flights. In March 2010, for economy class passengers on domestic and Canadian flights under six hours and on certain flights to and from Latin America, the airline discontinued free meals and began buy on board service in the northern hemisphere in the fall of 2010.

=== Meal and drink services ===
Meals were free on BusinessFirst on all flights. Flights of a duration of over one hour within North America and flights to and from resort destinations in the Caribbean and Latin America had meals in First Class depending on the mealtimes that the flights are within. All flights to and from non-resort destinations in the Caribbean and Latin America had free meals in First Class, with the exception of certain flights that depart after midnight. Meals in Economy Class were served on most flights to and from Asia and Europe. Meals were offered in economy class on all flights to and from non-resort destinations in the Caribbean Latin America, with the exception of some flights departing after midnight. Flights within Asia and the Pacific that were previously operated by Continental Micronesia had free meals and/or snacks offered during mealtimes. Meals were available for purchase on all economy class flights within North America, to/from Canada, and to/from resort destinations within the Caribbean and Latin America if the flight's duration was over 6 1/2 hours.

Towards the end of the airline's life, on most economy class flights within North America, to/from Canada, and to/from resort destinations within the Caribbean and Latin America, Continental had a buy on board service. On those flights between 2 1/2 hours and 6 1/2 hours, snacks were available for purchase, and food for purchase was available on most of those flights that are 3 1/2 to 6 1/2 hours. Originally the airline provided meals free of charge on flights more than 1 1/2 hours. The airline continued doing so after competitors charged for meals. In March 2010 the airline announced that it would switch to buy on board for food in fall 2010. The airline said that the absence of free meals would save the airline $35 million per year ($51,674,805 when adjusted for inflation), and if half of economy class passengers on the affected flights purchased food, the airline would make an additional $17 million per year ($25,099,191 when adjusted for inflation). The airline did not say how the transition to buy on board would affect the employment of workers at the subsidiary Chelsea Food Services. Buy on board began on October 12, 2010. On March 1, 2011, Continental stopped serving free snacks on domestic flights to coach passengers in order to align itself with the policy of United Airlines. In addition, on that day all fights between Hawaii, Alaska, and the Mainland U.S. became buy on board flights.

Continental Airlines offered free special meal options on certain flights; special meals include the Child, Gluten intolerant, Hindu vegetarian, Jain, Kosher, Muslim, and Vegan options. The airline offered special meals for all classes of service on flights to and between Houston and Argentina, Asia, Brazil, Europe, and Hawaii, and the airline offered special meals for all classes of service on flights between Newark and Asia, Brazil, Europe, and Hawaii; flights between Newark and India use Hindu vegetarian as a standard meal choice. In addition, special meals were available in first class on flights between Newark and Alaska, California, Oregon, Washington, and British Columbia. Other routes with special meal service available in first class include Los Angeles to/from Honolulu, Los Angeles to/from Maui, Orange County to/from Honolulu, and Orange County to/from Maui.

The airline offered soft drinks that are free on all flights. Beer, liqueurs, spirits, and wine were free of charge in BusinessFirst and Business Class on all flights, and for a charge in economy class on all flights. On flights within North America and to or from the Caribbean and Latin America, the airline offered "Specialty Beverages" for purchase in economy class.

=== In-flight entertainment ===
Boeing 757-200 and 777-200ER aircraft included Audio-Video On-Demand (AVOD) in every seat back. Boeing 767 family aircraft were equipped with a personal television located in every seat back, using a tape system. On all Boeing 757-200 and Boeing 777-200ER aircraft, all rows were equipped with power-ports (two power ports per group of 3 seats) that do not require special power adapters or cables.

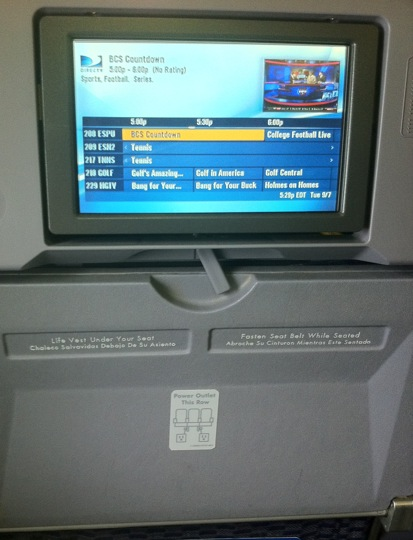
DirecTV on board a Continental 737-800

Continental Airlines began offering 95 channels of live DirecTV television to all passengers on its domestic fleet beginning in January 2009. Boeing 737-700s, 800s, 900s, and 900ERs and Boeing 757-300s were going to receive the service. The service became available immediately after a credit card is swiped and confirmed, and could be activated at any point during the flight. Movies started at a set time and cannot be paused, rewound or fast-forwarded. The service was free to first-class passengers and was available for a charge of US$6 in the coach cabin. Service could become limited and/or interrupted during descent.

On December 16, 2009, Continental Airlines, announced that, beginning in the second quarter 2010(see note) it will offer Gogo Inflight Internet service on its fleet of 21 Boeing 757-300 aircraft that primarily serve domestic routes. The new Gogo Inflight Internet service will provide customers full Internet access on their own standard, Wi-Fi equipped laptop or Personal Electronic Device (PED) at speeds similar to wireless mobile broadband services on the ground. Customers will be able to sign up and log in once the aircraft reaches 10,000 feet (3,000 m). The Gogo system, powered by the Aircell Network and available in the continental U.S., will be available to customers at a cost from $4.95 and up, based on length of flight.

At airport kiosks Continental Airlines allowed customers to buy "Continental Currency", a prepaid credit for audio headsets and alcoholic beverages on flights.

== OnePass ==
Continental's OnePass logo

Established in 1987 in cooperation with now defunct Eastern Air Lines, OnePass was the frequent flyer program for Continental Airlines, the Trump Shuttle, Copa Airlines and Copa Airlines Colombia. OnePass offered regular travelers the privilege to obtain free tickets, First Class upgrades on flights, discounted membership for its airport lounge (President's Club), and other types of rewards. Customers accumulated miles from flight segments they fly or through Continental Airlines partners. OnePass elite tiers were Silver, Gold, and Platinum Elite which have benefits such as free upgrades, mileage bonus, priority check-in, priority boarding, and much more. Continental previously had a frequent flyer program prior to OnePass called TravelBank, which was started not long after American Airlines started its frequent flyer program in 1981 and when most large United States airlines followed, but this was merged with Eastern Airlines' frequent flyer program in 1987 to form OnePass. The name "OnePass" refers to the ability to accumulate miles on two major airlines, namely Continental and Eastern, in one frequent flyer program.

In addition to its Continental Express, Continental Connection and Star Alliance partnerships, Continental had frequent flyer partnerships with the following airlines (as of February 2012):

- Aeromar
- Cape Air
- Copa Airlines
- EVA Air
- Hawaiian Airlines
- Island Air

As a result of United Airlines and Continental Airlines merger, on March 3, 2012, OnePass program was phased out and merged into United MileagePlus program. OnePass stopped accepting new membership applications effective February 29, 2012.

== Accidents and incidents ==
The following were major accidents and incidents that have occurred on Continental Airlines mainline aircraft.

Continental Airlines reported accidents and incidents
Flight	Date	Aircraft	Location	Passengers/crew	Injuries				Other
Flight	Date	Aircraft	Location	Passengers/crew	Fatal	Serious	Minor	Ground or other injuries/fatalities	Other
N/A	August 27, 1945	Lockheed Lodestar	Albuquerque, New Mexico						
46	March 16, 1954	Convair CV-340	Midland, Texas	8/3	0	0	11	0	
11	May 22, 1962	Boeing 707-100	Unionville, Missouri	37/8	45	0	0	0	
210	July 8, 1962	Vickers Viscount	Lubbock International Airport	13/3	0	0	0	0	
290	January 29, 1963	Vickers Viscount	Kansas City, Missouri	5/3	8	0	0	0	
12	July 1, 1965	Boeing 707-124	Kansas City, Missouri	60/6	0	0	0	0	
712	August 4, 1971	Boeing 707-320C	Compton, California	87/9	0	0	0	2 injuries (on Cessna 150)	Mid-air collision, both occupants of Cessna 150 survived with injuries
N/A	April 13, 1973	Sabreliner 60	Montrose, Colorado	0/2	2	0	0	0	
426	August 7, 1975	Boeing 727-200	Denver, Colorado	124/7	0	0	15	0	
603	March 1, 1978	McDonnell Douglas DC-10	Los Angeles	189/11	4	29	167	10 (firefighters injured)	2 died during evacuation, 2 died three months later of their injuries
25	July 8, 1987	Boeing 747	North Atlantic Ocean	399/19	0	0	0	0	Near mid-air collision with off-course Delta flight
1713	November 15, 1987	McDonnell Douglas DC-9	Denver	77/5	28	28	26	0	
795	March 2, 1994	McDonnell Douglas MD-82	New York	110/6	0	0	30	0	
1943	February 19, 1996	McDonnell Douglas DC-9	Houston	82/5	0	0	12	0	
475	September 16, 1998	Boeing 737-500	Guadalajara	102/6	0	0	0	0	Aircraft damaged beyond repair
55	July 25, 2000	McDonnell Douglas DC-10	Paris, France		0	0	0	0	Mechanical failure (source of foreign object that caused Air France Flight 4590 to crash)
1515	January 16, 2006	Boeing 737-524	El Paso, Texas	114/5	0	0	0	1 fatality (ground crew mechanic)	Mechanic checking for oil leak stepped into hazard zone, got ingested into the engine.
1404	December 20, 2008	Boeing 737-500	Denver	110/5	0	2	45	0	
128	August 3, 2009	Boeing 767-224	Dominican Republic	168/11	0	4	22	0	Strong clear-air turbulence approximately 50 nm North of Dominican Republic, 600 nm south of Miami, 26 injured.

- August 27, 1945 – A Lockheed Lodestar burned out while parked at Albuquerque, New Mexico; there was no one on board.
- March 16, 1954 – Flight 46, on a flight from Midland, Texas, to Kansas City, Missouri, suffered vibration just after takeoff and went into a dive; the flight crew managed to make a wheels-up landing in an open field.
- May 22, 1962 – Thomas Doty, a passenger intent on having his wife claim money from life insurance, boarded Flight 11 with a bomb, which departed Chicago-O’Hare, destined for Kansas City Municipal Airport. The bomb exploded, breaking off the aircraft's tail, and the plane crashed on a farm near Unionville, Missouri. All 45 on board died, including the suicide bomber. This aircraft had previously been subject to an attempted hijacking to Cuba, although the hijackers were captured in El Paso, Texas.
- July 8, 1962 – A Vickers Viscount was damaged beyond economic repair when the propellers struck the runway shortly after take-off. A wheels-up landing was made in a wheat field.
- January 29, 1963 – Flight 290, en route from Midland, Texas, to Kansas City, crashed on approach near the south end of the runway and burst into flames.
- August 4, 1971 – Continental Airlines Flight 712, on a flight coming from Hilo International Airport into Los Angeles International Airport collided in midair over Compton with a Cessna 150 at about 3,950 feet during an evening approach to LAX. The Boeing 707-320C suffered substantial damage to the outer right-wing panel but landed safely. The Cessna 150 crashed and was destroyed but both occupants survived with injuries.
- April 13, 1973 – After bringing Bob and Audrey Six to their Colorado ranch, the Sabreliner crew departed Montrose Regional Airport, for the return flight to Los Angeles (LAX). The thrust reverser of the aircraft was deployed in flight shortly after takeoff. The aircraft descended from 1,000 feet (300 m), struck the ground, and was destroyed.
- August 7, 1975 – Flight 426, bound for Wichita, Kansas, crashed near the departure end of runway shortly after takeoff from Denver-Stapleton International Airport. The aircraft encountered severe windshear at an altitude and airspeed which precluded recovery to level flight. The aircraft descended at a rate which could not be overcome even though the aircraft was flown at or near its maximum lift capability throughout the encounter. The windshear was generated by the outflow from a thunderstorm which was over the aircraft's departure path. All passengers and crew were safely evacuated. The aircraft, a Boeing 727, was a total loss.
- March 1, 1978 – Flight 603 was scheduled to Honolulu, HI from Los Angeles. At takeoff, the McDonnell-Douglas DC-10 overran the runway at Los Angeles (LAX) when the takeoff was aborted as a result of a tire explosion. The resulting overrun caused a fire that engulfed the aircraft. The aircraft was a total loss; two passengers died when they evacuated the aircraft directly into the fire. Two other passengers died three months later of their injuries.
- July 8, 1987 – A Continental Boeing 747 had a near collision with an off-course Delta Air Lines Lockheed L-1011. Both the Delta (London-Cincinnati) and Continental (London-Newark) were heading to the U.S., with a total of nearly 600 people on board. The Delta flight strayed 60 miles (97 km) off course during its flight, and came within 30 feet (9.1 m) of colliding with the 747 as the L-1011 flew under it in Canadian airspace. It was potentially the deadliest aviation accident in history. Delta pilots attempted to convince the Continental crew to cover up the incident and not report it.
- November 15, 1987 – Flight 1713, bound for Boise, Idaho, crashed on take-off during a snowstorm at Stapleton International Airport, Denver, Colorado. 25 passengers and 3 crew were killed.
- March 2, 1994 – Flight 795, a McDonnell Douglas MD-82, suffered damage due to a rejected takeoff from runway 13 at LaGuardia Airport during wintry conditions. The aircraft failed to takeoff and came to a stop at the edge of a ditch near the runway. 30 Passengers and crew suffered minor injuries.
- February 19, 1996 – Flight 1943 landed wheels up on runway 27 at the Houston Intercontinental Airport, Houston, Texas.
- September 16, 1998 – Flight 475 from Houston to Guadalajara, a Boeing 737-500, was damaged beyond repair upon exiting the left side of the runway while landing. There were no injuries, and wind shear is suspected to have been a factor.
- January 16, 2006 – A mechanic standing near a Boeing 737 at El Paso International Airport in Texas was sucked into one of the engines and killed. The mechanic's failure to maintain proper clearance with the engine intake during a jet engine run, and the failure of contract maintenance personnel to follow written procedures and directives contained in the airline's general maintenance manual were determined to be the cause. Factors contributing to the accident were the insufficient training provided to the contract mechanics by the airline, and the failure of the airport to disseminate a policy prohibiting ground engine runs above idle power in the terminal area.
- December 20, 2008 – Flight 1404 bound for Houston, pulled left and ran off of the runway during its takeoff roll at Denver International Airport. The cause of the incident is unknown, however the right side of aircraft caught fire once coming to a stop. Of the 115 people on board, 47 sustained injuries, with 2 seriously injured, including the pilot.

=== Incidents ===
- July 1, 1965 – Continental Airlines Flight 12, a Boeing 707-100, ran off the runway at Kansas City Downtown Airport landing in heavy rain. All 66 on board survived however the aircraft broke apart in several places and was a total loss.
- March 1, 1978 – Continental Airlines Flight 603 was a scheduled McDonnell Douglas DC-10 flight between Los Angeles International Airport and Honolulu International Airport. On March 1, 1978, it crashed during an aborted takeoff, resulting in the deaths of four passengers.
- October 28, 2006 – Continental Flight 1883, a Boeing 757-200 aircraft carrying 160 passengers, landed on a narrow unoccupied taxiway parallel to runway 29 at Newark Liberty International Airport. No one was injured and both pilots were removed from flying status duties pending an investigation. They have since been reinstated. Potentially confusing runway lighting and pilot error were cited in the investigation.
- In January 2007 – A Continental Boeing 757 pilot died en route from Houston to Puerto Vallarta, Mexico. The flight was diverted to McAllen, Texas.
- In November 2008 – The airline temporarily cancelled its flights to Mumbai Airport due to passenger and crew safety during the terrorist attacks in Mumbai led by 10 Pakistan based Lashkar-e-Taiba terrorists. Continental resumed its flights once the attacks ended after the last attacker was killed by security forces.
- June 18, 2009 – The captain of Continental Airlines Flight 61, a Boeing 777-200ER, en route from Brussels, Belgium, to Newark, New Jersey, died of natural causes during the trip. The airline alerted federal authorities around 10:30 that morning that Flight 61 was being flown by the first officer and relief pilot. The plane with 247 passengers aboard landed safely at Newark Liberty International Airport at about noon EDT.
- August 3, 2009 – Continental Airlines Flight 128, a Boeing 767, made an emergency landing in Miami (Miami International Airport) due to extreme turbulence. This flight was scheduled from Rio de Janeiro (Rio de Janeiro-Galeão International Airport) to Houston (George Bush Intercontinental Airport). The plane carried 11 crew members and 168 passengers. At least 26 passengers were injured, including four seriously.
- December 6, 2010 – Continental Airlines was found criminally responsible for the disaster to Concorde (Air France Flight 4590) at Gonesse on July 25, 2000 (an accident that killed one hundred passengers and nine crew members on board the plane, and four persons on the ground) by a Parisian court and was fined €200,000 ($271,628) and ordered to pay Air France €1 million. Continental mechanic John Taylor was given a 15-month suspended sentence, while another airline operative and three French officials were cleared of all charges. The court ruled that the crash resulted from a piece of metal from a Continental jet that was left on the runway; the object punctured a tire on the Concorde and then ruptured a fuel tank. Another Continental employee, Stanley Ford, was found not guilty. On November 29, 2012, a French appeals court overturned that decision, thereby clearing Continental of criminal responsibility, although the civil compensation claims were left intact.

== See also ==
- Air transportation in the United States
- Independent Association of Continental Pilots
- List of airlines of the United States
- List of defunct airlines of the United States
- List of airports in the United States
- Transportation in the United States

== Bibliography ==
- Six, R.F. (1959). Continental Airlines-A story of growth. Newcomen Publ. & Princeton University.
- Serling, R.J. (1974). Maverick-The story of Robert Six and Continental Airlines. Garden City (N.Y.): Doubleday & Co.
- Davies, R.E.G. (1984). Continental Airlines-The first fifty years 1934-1984. The Woodlands (TX): Pioneer Publications Inc.
