= Thomas G. Plaskett =

American business executive (1943–2021)

- Born: Thomas George Plaskett; December 24, 1943; Kansas City, Missouri, U.S.
- Died: June 24, 2021 (aged 77); Dallas, Texas, U.S.
- Education: General Motors Institute (BS); Harvard University (MBA)

Thomas George Plaskett (December 24, 1943 – June 24, 2021) was an American business executive. He was CEO of Continental Airlines, Pan American World Airways, and Greyhound Lines. He was instrumental in establishing AAdvantage.

== Early life and education ==
Plaskett was born in Kansas City, Missouri, on Christmas Eve 1943. He attended Raytown Senior High School in his hometown. He studied industrial engineering at the General Motors Institute of Technology (known as Kettering University since 1998), obtaining a bachelor's degree in 1966. He went on to earn a Master of Business Administration at Harvard Business School.

== Career ==
=== American Airlines ===
Plaskett began his career at American Airlines in 1974, starting out as assistant controller. He spent twelve years there, rising to the position of senior vice president, marketing. He played a major role in creating AAdvantage, the country's first frequent flyer club and advance-purchase discount fares. He also initiated the airline's 30-day advance purchase 'ultimate super-saver' fares and the 50 percent cancellation penalties. These were subsequently adopted by most of the other US airlines. Plaskett had been tipped to become president of American Airlines before joining Continental Airlines.

=== Continental Airlines ===
Plaskett became the president and CEO of Continental Airlines in October 1986. That autumn he was named one of the nation's 10 most-desired managers by Fortune. Under his leadership, Continental Airlines doubled in size on February 1, 1987, as the operations of People Express, Frontier Airlines, and New York Air merged into Continental's. The overnight combination of the airlines led to poor service that caused a loss of passengers. Additionally, Plaskett had to deal with low morale among the company's expanded and relatively low paid workforce.

In July 1987 Plaskett was fired by Frank Lorenzo, the chairman of Continental Airlines' parent company Texas Air Corporation. Lorenzo blamed Texas Air Corporation's deficit to Continental's "disappointing" performance under Plaskett. The Wall Street Journal, citing company sources, described his tenure as CEO as "marked by clashes and discomfort with the freewheeling management style that permeates Texas Air. His emphasis on deliberation and his more traditional corporate style...didn't sit well with more established managers". He was succeeded by Lorenzo.

After his dismissal from Continental, Plaskett ran a consulting business in Dallas, Texas.

=== Pan American World Airways ===
Plaskett was named president, CEO, and chairman of Pan American Corp in January 1988. Three years later, the company entered bankruptcy court protection. He was replaced as CEO by Russell L. Ray Jr. on October 1, 1991.

=== Fox Run Capital Associates and Greyhound Lines ===
After leaving Pan American, Plaskett became managing director of Fox Run Capital Associates, a private merchant banking and consulting firm. He was elected to the board of directors of Greyhound Lines in May 1994. Later that year, he became interim president, CEO, and CFO. From 1995 to 1999, he was chairman. He was a director of other companies, including NeoStar Retail Group, RadioShack Corporation, Smart & Final, Inc., and Novell. He retired from RadioShack's board of directors in November 2013.

== Personal life ==
Plaskett was married to Linda Maxey for 53 years until his death. They had two children, Kimberly and Keith. He resided in North Texas during his later years.

Plaskett died on June 24, 2021, in Dallas. He was 77.
