= Don Burr =

American businessman (born 1941)

- Born: May 8, 1941 (age 84); South Windsor, Connecticut
- Education: Harvard Business School, MBA, Stanford University, BA, Economics
- Occupation(s): Commercial airline entrepreneur, aviation executive, financial analyst
- Known for: Founding of People Express
- Spouse(s): Brigit Rupner Burr (married 1960, divorced 1992, deceased 2024), Melrose Dawsey Burr (married 1996--present)
- Children: Cameron Burr (1962) Whitney Burr (1965), Kelsey Burr Roberts (1973-2006), Andrew Burr (1974)

Donald C. Burr (born 1941) is an American businessman and aviation executive known for creating in 1981, the first nationally successful Ultra Low-Cost Carrier (ULCC) airline, People Express (April 30, 1981 – February 1, 1987), serving as its CEO (TIME magazine, January 13, 1986). With a vision for offering extremely low fares and pioneering the no-frills approach, Burr opened air travel to people who had not even considered it before. In just four years, he took the company to $1 billion in revenue (New Jersey; History of Ingenuity and Industry, James P. Johnson). Burr was one of seven candidates for TIME’s Man of the Year in 1985 and on the cover in 1986 for revolutionizing the air travel business.

== Early life ==
The son of Myron Burr, an MIT-trained engineer and Lorna Chittenden Burr, a social worker, Don Burr was born in South Windsor, CT. The Burrs are distantly related to Aaron Burr, Thomas Jefferson’s Vice President. Encouraged by his dad who served as choir director at their church and his mom who directed the Sunday school, Burr told his high school friends he wanted to be a preacher. He sang in the barbershop quartet, played saxophone in the band, played soccer, basketball, and baseball, and took up flying.

While in college at Stanford University, Burr supported his family by selling encyclopedias, hashing tables, and managing an apartment building and the Stanford Flying Club. Though he had his sights on law school, a couple of Alpha Delta Phi fraternity brothers encouraged him to switch to finance to pursue a career on Wall Street (GQ magazine, February 1985). He went on to earn a degree in Economics from Stanford University and an MBA from Harvard University.

== Early career ==
Because of his interest in flying, at 24 Burr took a job at National Aviation Corporation (now defunct), a mutual fund on Wall Street dealing in airline securities. There, he earned a reputation for success in selecting stocks and became its president six years later.

Joining Texas International Airlines (TI) in 1973, Burr became Chief Operating Officer. In 1979 Burr became president of TI. During his time there he envisioned a new approach to employee motivation where everyone was an owner. He left after three years to start People Express.

== The Founding of People Express ==
A Carter Administration effort led by Civil Aeronautics Board Chairman and former Cornell University Professor Alfred E. Kahn, resulted in the Airline Deregulation Act by Congress in 1978. Subsequently, Burr saw an opportunity and filed for a certificate from the Civil Aeronautics Board in 1980; it was the first new airline sanctioned after deregulation. Operations began in the abandoned North Terminal of the Newark Liberty International Airport (EWR).

After a “quick takeoff” with just three used Boeing 737s, plus the commitment for another 14 planes from Lufthansa, and a team of 250 people, Burr was able to raise $24 million from Hambrecht & Quist through a public offering of stock and acquired 17 top-quality used Boeing 737s. They were the first U.S. airline to fund their operation by going public prior to their start.

In the midst of the air traffic controllers strike in 1981, Burr sequestered People’s general managers into a room and collectively they developed the six precepts (Harvard Business School, 1983) the start-up airline was known to follow:

1. Service; commitment to the growth and development of our people,

2. To be the best provider of air transportation,

3. To provide the highest quality of leadership,

4. To serve as a role model for others,

5. Simplicity, and

6. Maximization of profits.

The airline grew within four years to 4,000 employees, carrying nearly 1 million passengers a month making it the fifth largest airline behind United, American, Delta, and Eastern. Profits in 1984 totaled $23.5 million and People Express was named the fastest growing corporation in U.S. history at that time by the British magazine, The Economist (Harvard Business School, 1990).

In 1985 the airline acquired the struggling Denver-based Frontier Airlines, as well as Britt Airways and Provincetown-Boston Airline. By mid-1986 People Express was serving 133 airports and had passed the billion-dollar mark in total revenue.

Burr’s team at People Express “forced overwhelming and lasting changes” on other airlines (Thriving on Chaos: Handbook for a Management Revolution, Tom Peters).

Burr was known for his management style, unique at the time, of naming every employee a manager, including them in decision-making, and encouraging cross-training and rotation on a limited basis, so that every employee interacted with customers. In addition to participating in profit sharing, employees were required to purchase 100 shares of company stock at a discounted price, with company financing, if necessary, through nominal paycheck deductions.

An offer by United Airlines for the purchase of the struggling Frontier failed in 1986 and, among other factors, led to the sale of People Express and its affiliates to Texas Air Corporation of Houston, owner of Continental Airlines, Eastern Airlines, and New York Air; People Express was merged into Continental (now United Airlines).

== Business School Case Study ==
The advent of People Express had the effect of forcing established carriers to dramatically reduce fares and “…they woke up when they realized People was a billion-dollar company and that its growth was coming out of their hides,” said Julius Maldutis of Salomon Brothers in that same January issue of TIME.

On January 18, 1985, American Airlines announced its Ultimate Super Saver rates undercutting People Express, and traffic fell off for the first time in People’s history. American also took out ads in every market in which People operated saying “You don’t have to fly on People Express anymore to get these prices” (Chief Executive, March 2005). In November 1985, Continental Airlines, after losing the purchase of Frontier Airlines to People Express, also began an ad campaign targeting the low-cost flyer in the headline.

In Denver, United Airlines and Continental were destroying Frontier. With numbers dropping, Burr pursued its sale to United for $200 million, a move that would have ended the drain Burr faced with Frontier, but it fell apart amid labor struggles in the summer of 1986.

The sale of People Express to Texas Air for $125 million plus assumed debt, and Frontier Airline for $176 million, was official on February 1, 1987.

Subsequent aviation start-ups have sought Burr’s advice, like JetBlue CEO David Neeleman in a 1996 conversation about reservation systems (Forbes, October 14, 2002) and Cape Air Executive Chairman/Founder Dan Wolf. To this day, Burr’s Six Key Concepts of Leadership and the People Express story are included in business school curriculum.
