= Alvin Feldman =

American airline executive and mechanical engineer

Alvin Lindbergh Feldman
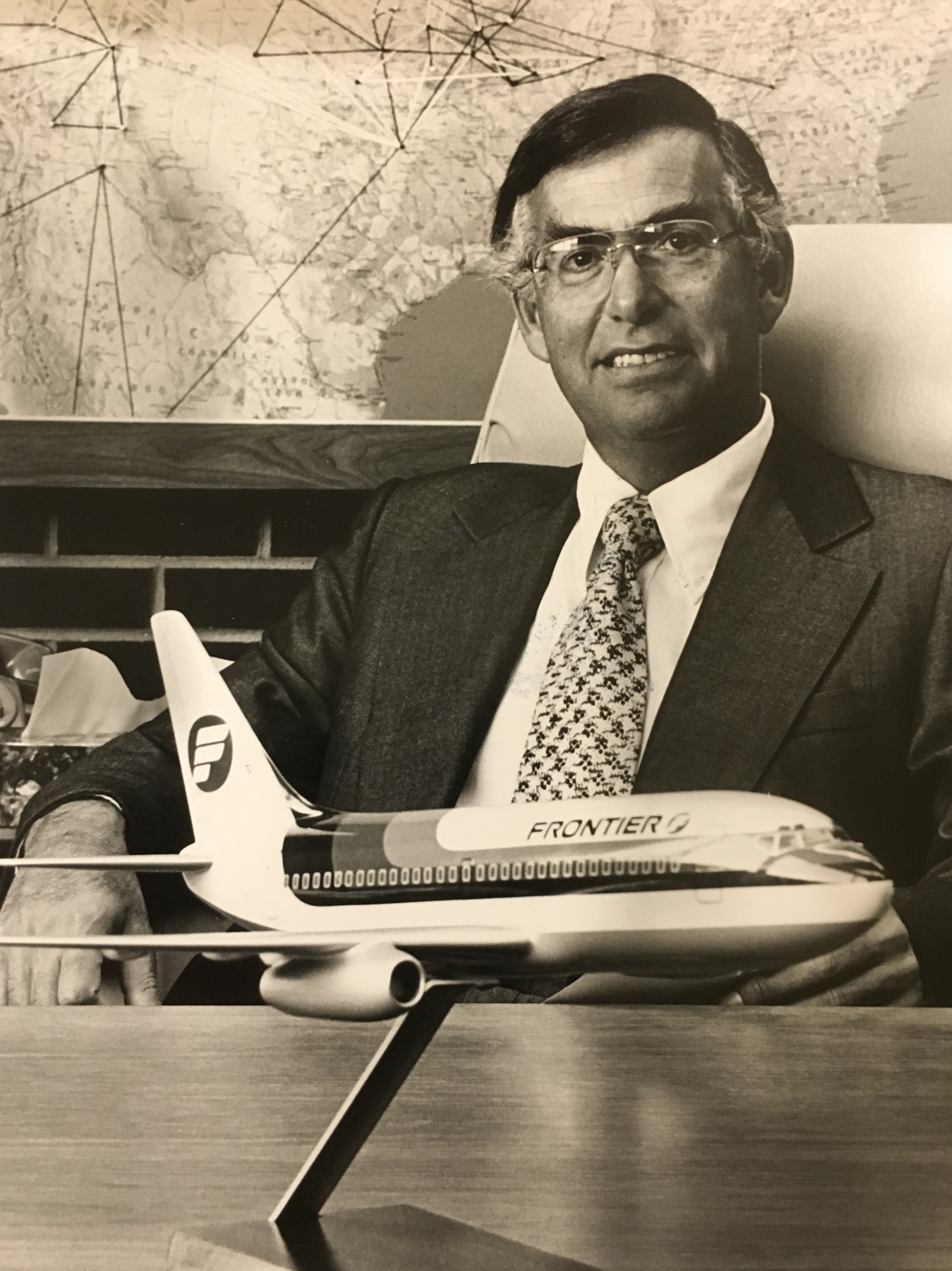
- Born: December 14, 1927; New York City, New York, U.S.
- Died: August 9, 1981 (aged 53); Los Angeles, California, U.S.
- Education: Cornell University
- Occupation: Airline Executive
- Spouse: Rosemily Petrison (m. 1952–1980)

Alvin "Al" Lindbergh Feldman (December 14, 1927 - August 9, 1981) was an airline executive and mechanical engineer. He was the president and chief executive of Frontier Airlines for nine years before taking over as president at Continental Airlines. He was a strong supporter of airline unions and airline deregulation. Under his leadership, Frontier Airlines grew into a well-managed and profitable company.

== Biography ==
Feldman was born in New York City in 1927. He was given his middle name, Lindbergh, after Charles Lindbergh’s famous Paris flight in the same year. He attended Cornell University and graduated with a Bachelor of Science in Mechanical Engineering.

In 1952, he married Rosemily Petrison. They later had three children, David, John, and Susan.

In 1980, Rosemily died from cancer. It was a huge blow to Feldman, and cast him into a depression that would eventually take his life.

== Career ==
Feldman worked at Aerojet-General for 17 years as an aerospace contractor. During that time, he managed the development of the engines of the Gemini-Titan II launch vehicle. He eventually became the president and Chief Operating Officer of Aerojet Nuclear Systems Company, a division of Aerojet-General.

=== Frontier ===
In 1971, Feldman moved to Denver in order to lead Frontier Airlines, which had been struggling. As president, he transformed the airline into a highly profitable business through a combination of improving passenger amenities, restructuring, and employee motivation.

=== Continental ===
In 1980, Feldman left Frontier to head Continental Airlines. Continental was struggling, and hoped Feldman would be able to transform the company as he had with Frontier. He replaced Robert Six as President and Chief Executive Officer. Six, then 73, had a very high opinion of Feldman and was confident that he would be able to reduce Continental's losses.

Hardly a year after Feldman moved to Continental, Texas International made a move to acquire the airline. The president of Texas International, Frank Lorenzo, eventually bought out 48.5 percent of Continental’s stock. Worried that Lorenzo’s acquisition of the company would mean losing their jobs and that Lorenzo was anti-union, the employees of Continental came to Feldman to retain hold of the company. Feldman had received offers to become chief executive at Pan Am and Twentieth Century Fox, but chose to stay at Continental.

Feldman attempted to give Continental’s employees control of the company via an employee stock ownership plan. The idea was to issue 15.4 million new shares of stock and dilute Lorenzo’s shares enough to block the takeover. Among vocal employee protests and demonstrations, Feldman told Lorenzo that the determination of the employees would prevent the takeover from happening. However, their plan fell through when the banks offering financial support withdrew their offer, and the Civil Aeronautics Board gave Texas International approval to acquire the company.

== Death ==
When it became clear that Continental would be taken over despite his efforts, Feldman grew despondent. On the night of August 9, 1981, Feldman committed suicide with a revolver in his office in Los Angeles. It is believed that the loss of Continental, following the loss of his wife the previous year, drove him into a severe depression. He is buried with his wife in El Camino Memorial Park, near San Diego.

Preceded by Bob Six	CEO of Continental Airlines; 1980 – 1981	Succeeded by George A. Warde
