= Walter Varney =

American aviator (1888–1967)

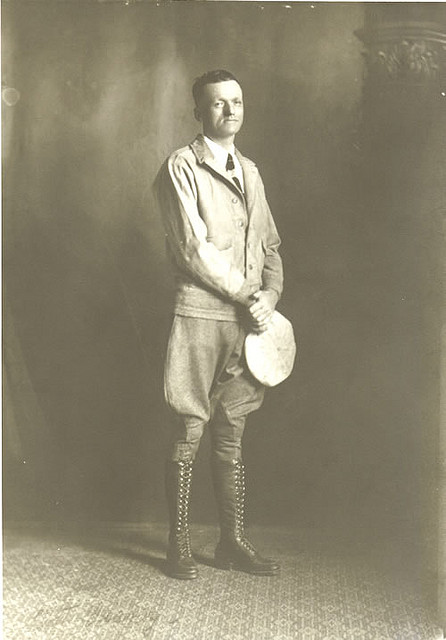
- Walter T. Varney, founder of predecessors of United and Continental Airlines, in 1921
- Born: Walter Thomas Varney; December 26, 1888; San Francisco, California, U.S.
- Died: January 25, 1967 (aged 78); Santa Barbara, California, U.S.
- Occupations: Pilot, Airline executive
- Spouse: Aileen Varney
- Children: 1
- Parent(s): Thomas and Ella Varney

Walter Thomas Varney (December 26, 1888 – January 25, 1967) was an American aviation pioneer who founded forerunners of two major U.S. airlines, United Airlines and Continental Airlines, which combined under United Continental Holdings in 2010, long after his death in 1967. Varney was also one of the most prominent airmail contractors of the early 20th century.

Varney served as a pilot in the Aviation Section, U.S. Signal Corps during World War I. After the war Varney established an aviation school and air taxi service in northern California.

== Aviation career ==
After finishing flight school in 1918, he purchased Lynch Field in Redwood City with the goal of starting a flying school and an air taxi service from San Francisco.

Continental Airlines was founded in 1934 by Varney and his partner Louis Mueller as Varney Speed Lines. On July 15, 1934, Varney Speed Lines flew its first trip on a 530-mile route from Pueblo, Colorado to El Paso, Texas with stops in Las Vegas, New Mexico, and Santa Fe and Albuquerque New Mexico. Varney ceded control to Mueller in 1934, and in 1936 a controlling interest in the company was sold to Robert Six who renamed it Continental Airlines in 1937, moving its headquarters to Denver.

In 1932, Varney contributed half of the $40,000 needed to purchase the Lockheed division of Detroit Aircraft Corporation out of bankruptcy. The company was reorganized in Burbank, California as the Lockheed Aircraft Corporation. Varney retired from that company in 1951.

== Later years and death ==
In his later years, Varney suffered from chronic pulmonary emphysema, chronic bronchitis, and valvular heart disease. He lived for a time with the family of his son-in-law, Richard Lambert. He died of bronchial pneumonia on Jan. 25, 1967 at Dani's Nursing Home in Santa Barbara, California. He was buried in Cypress Lawn Memorial Park in Colma, California in the Varney family plot.
