= Charlie Bryan =

Charlie Bryan (11 December 1933 – 2 November 2013) was the head of the International Association of Machinists union in the southeast United States, during the mid to late 1980s. He led machinists to strike against Eastern Air Lines and Frank Lorenzo in 1989.
