= Britt Airways =

Regional airline of the United States (1964–1996)

| IATA | ICAO | Call sign |
|---|---|---|
| RU | BTA | JETLINK |
- Founded: 1964; 62 years ago (as Vercoa Air Service)
- Commenced operations: 1975; 51 years ago (as Britt Airways)
- Ceased operations: 1996; 30 years ago (merged into ExpressJet)
- Frequent-flyer program: OnePass
- Parent company: People Express Airlines (1986–1987); Continental Airlines (1987–1996)
- Headquarters: Terre Haute, Indiana, U.S.
- Key people: William Britt; Marilyn Britt

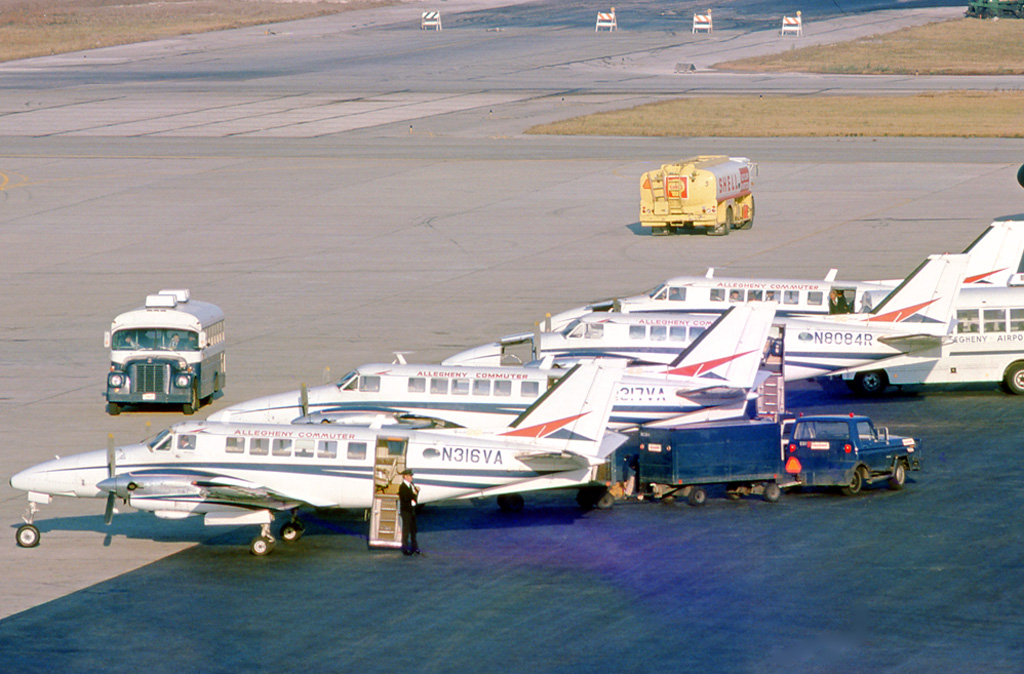
Beechcraft 99 operating for Allegheny Commuter at Chicago O'Hare in 1975

BAC 1-11 Chicago 1984

Britt Airways was a regional airline in the United States that operated from 1964 until it merged with ExpressJet in 1996. It was established as Vercoa Air Service in 1964 and renamed to Britt Airlines when it was purchased by William and Marilyn Britt in 1975 later on Britt Airways. It was based in Terre Haute, Indiana until 1996. It began as a commuter airline. It primarily operated turboprop aircraft but also flew British Aircraft Corporation BAC One-Eleven twinjets as an independent air carrier at one point as well. The airline evolved into a regional air carrier operating code share flights primarily for Continental Airlines.

== History ==
By 1969 Britt Airways purchased a small fleet of Beechcraft 99 light turboprop airliners that were operated under contract as Allegheny Commuter flights on behalf of Allegheny Airlines. Allegheny had recently begun flights from Chicago O'Hare that were acquired through a merger with Lake Central Airlines. Initially, Britt replaced Allegheny on a route between Chicago and Danville, IL. According to the October 29, 1978 Britt Airways system timetable, commuter flights for Allegheny were operated by Britt from the airline's small hub located at Chicago O'Hare Airport (ORD) with service to Bloomington, IN, Danville, IL, Indianapolis, IN, Muncie, IN and Terre Haute, IN, all former Lake Central routes that were acquired by Allegheny. In 1979, Britt was continuing to serve these aforementioned destinations as an Allegheny Commuter air carrier from Chicago and was also flying independently operated service to Bloomington, IL/Normal, IL, Champaign, IL/Urbana, IL, Evansville, IN, Galesburg, IL, Indianapolis, IN, Moline, IL, Peoria, IL, St. Louis, MO, Springfield, IL and Sterling, IL/Rock Falls, IL with flights primarily operated from Chicago O'Hare as well as an Indianapolis-Evansville-St. Louis route and an Indianapolis-Champaign/Urbana route. All Allegheny Commuter as well as independently operated services were being flown with Beechcraft 99 and Swearingen Metroliner (Metro II model) turboprops at this time. By 1980, the airline had expanded its hub operation at Chicago O'Hare with new service to Decatur, IL, Mattoon, IL/Charleston, IL, and South Bend, IN, and had also expanded its fleet with the addition of larger Fairchild Hiller FH-227 turboprops.

In 1981, Britt began operating as an independent air carrier from a major hub located at Chicago O'Hare Airport (ORD) and also from smaller hubs located at St. Louis Lambert International Airport (STL) and Indianapolis International Airport (IND). By early 1985, the airline was operating jet service as an independent air carrier with British Aircraft Corporation BAC One-Eleven twin jets and was also continuing to fly Beechcraft 99, Fairchild Hiller FH-227 and Swearingen Metroliner (Metro II model) turboprops.

In 1985, the founder and owner of Britt Airways, Bill Britt, sold the airline to People Express. A new hub at St. Louis was established and select flights from St. Louis began operating under code sharing with People Express (PE) while other flights, including all flights at Chicago, remained operating under the RU code for Britt Airways.

From late 1985 through late 1986, Britt operated code sharing flight services for Piedmont Airlines (1948-1989) as a Piedmont Commuter System air carrier from the Dayton International Airport (DAY) in Ohio where Piedmont was operating a hub at the time.

Frank Lorenzo's holding company, Texas Air Corporation, acquired People Express later in 1985. Texas Air Corporation had previously acquired Continental Airlines (CO) and merged Texas International Airlines (predecessor to Texas Air) and CO under the Continental name in 1982. In 2010 Continental merged into United Airlines.

On February 1, 1987, People Express and Continental were merged retaining the Continental Airlines name. All Britt Airways operations began code sharing flights under the Continental Express banner for Continental from its major hubs located at Houston Intercontinental Airport (IAH, now George Bush Intercontinental Airport) in Houston, Texas, and at the former People Express hub at Newark International Airport (EWR, now Newark Liberty International Airport) in Newark, New Jersey. All flights at Britt's original and long-standing operation at the Chicago O'hare hub were also transitioned to flying as Continental Express however the entire Chicago operation was discontinued in early 1989. Britt also had a single route from the former Chicago Meigs Field airport to Springfield, IL which continued until 1991. According to the Official Airline Guide (OAG), in 1989 Britt was the primary Continental Express carrier at Houston Intercontinental operating ATR-42 and Embraer EMB-120 Brasilia propjet aircraft on feeder services on behalf of Continental. By 1991, the airline was the primary Continental Express carrier at Newark as well operating ATR-42 and Embraer EMB-120 Brasilia aircraft according to the OAG.

Beginning in November, 1987, Continental Airlines established a hub at Cleveland Hopkins Airport (CLE) and Britt began operating as the Continental Express feeder carrier there flying Swearingen Metroliner (Metro II model) propjets. By 1989, Britt was operating all Continental Express flights from Cleveland with Embraer EMB-120 Brasilia propjets.

In 1991, Britt Airways began operating Continental Express service formerly flown by Rocky Mountain Airways from Denver (DEN). According to the October 1, 1991 Official Airline Guide (OAG), the airline was operating Continental Express flights from Denver with de Havilland Canada DHC-7 Dash 7 and Beechcraft 1900C turboprops formerly flown by Rocky Mountain Airways as well as with ATR-42 propjets.

== Destinations in 1984 ==
According to its May 29, 1984 route map, Britt Airways was serving the following destinations as an independent air carrier. Destinations noted in bold were receiving British Aircraft Corporation BAC One-Eleven jet service operated by Britt in early 1985.

- Bloomington, IL/Normal, IL
- Bloomington, IN
- Burlington, IA
- Cape Girardeau, MO
- **Cedar Rapids, IA** - (Iowa City, IA was served via Cedar Rapids)
- **Chicago, IL - O'Hare Airport** - Primary Hub
- **Champaign, IL** - (Urbana, IL was served via Champaign)
- Cincinnati, OH
- Danville, IL
- Decatur, IL
- Detroit, MI
- **Evansville, IN**
- Galesburg, IL
- **Indianapolis, IN** - Secondary Hub
- Lafayette, IN
- Mattoon, IL/Charleston, IL
- Memphis, TN
- Marion, IL/Herrin, IL
- Moline, IL - (Davenport, IA was served via Moline)
- Muncie, IN
- Paducah, KY
- Peoria, IL
- Quincy, IL
- St. Louis, MO - Secondary Hub
- South Bend, IN
- Springfield, IL
- Sterling, IL/Rock Falls, IL
- Terre Haute, IN - Headquarters for the airline

== Fleet ==
World Airline Fleets 1979 (copyright 1979) lists the following aircraft types being operated at this time by Britt Airway:

- 10 Beech 99
- 1 Cessna 150L
- 1 Cessna 172M
- 1 Cessna 182K
- 1 Cessna 402

1987-88 World Airline Fleets (copyright 1987) lists the following aircraft types being operated at this time by Britt Airways:

- 12 Beech 99
- 2 British Aircraft Corporation BAC One-Eleven (only jet aircraft type operated by the airline)
- 7 Fairchild F-27
- 6 Fairchild-Hiller FH-227
- 18 Swearingen Metroliner II

Britt operated the following aircraft types at different times over the years. Fleet information is taken from the Britt historical website, www.brittairlines.com

- ATR-42
- Beechcraft 99
- British Aircraft Corporation BAC One-Eleven series 400 (only jet aircraft type operated by the airline)
- Embraer EMB 120 Brasilia
- Fairchild F-27
- Fairchild Hiller FH-227
- Swearingen Metroliner - (Metro II models)

Britt also operated Beechcraft 1900C and de Havilland Canada DHC-7 Dash 7 aircraft formerly flown by Rocky Mountain Airways following its commencement of Continental Express service in Denver.

== Accidents and incidents ==
- The airline's first fatal accident was on Jan. 30, 1984, when a repositioning flight from Terre Haute, Indiana to Evansville, Indiana crashed shortly after takeoff from Hulman Regional Airport in Terre Haute. Three Britt employees were killed. The National Transportation Safety Board could not determine the cause of the crash but found unauthorized wiring in the plane debris. The plane, N63Z, was destroyed.
- On September 11, 1991, Continental Express Flight 2574, operated by a Britt Airways Embraer 120 Brasilia, crashed while descending into Houston Intercontinental Airport after a domestic flight from Laredo, Texas, killing all 14 occupants. An investigation by the National Transportation Safety Board found that an improperly-maintained horizontal stabilizer failed during approach, causing a severe nose-down pitchover and breakup of the plane.

== See also ==
- List of defunct airlines of the United States

== Bibliography ==
- Eastwood, Tony. Turboprop Airliner Production List. 1998. The Aviation Hobby Shop. ISBN 0-907178-69-3.
