= Michael E. Levine =

US legal scholar & airline executive (1941–2017)

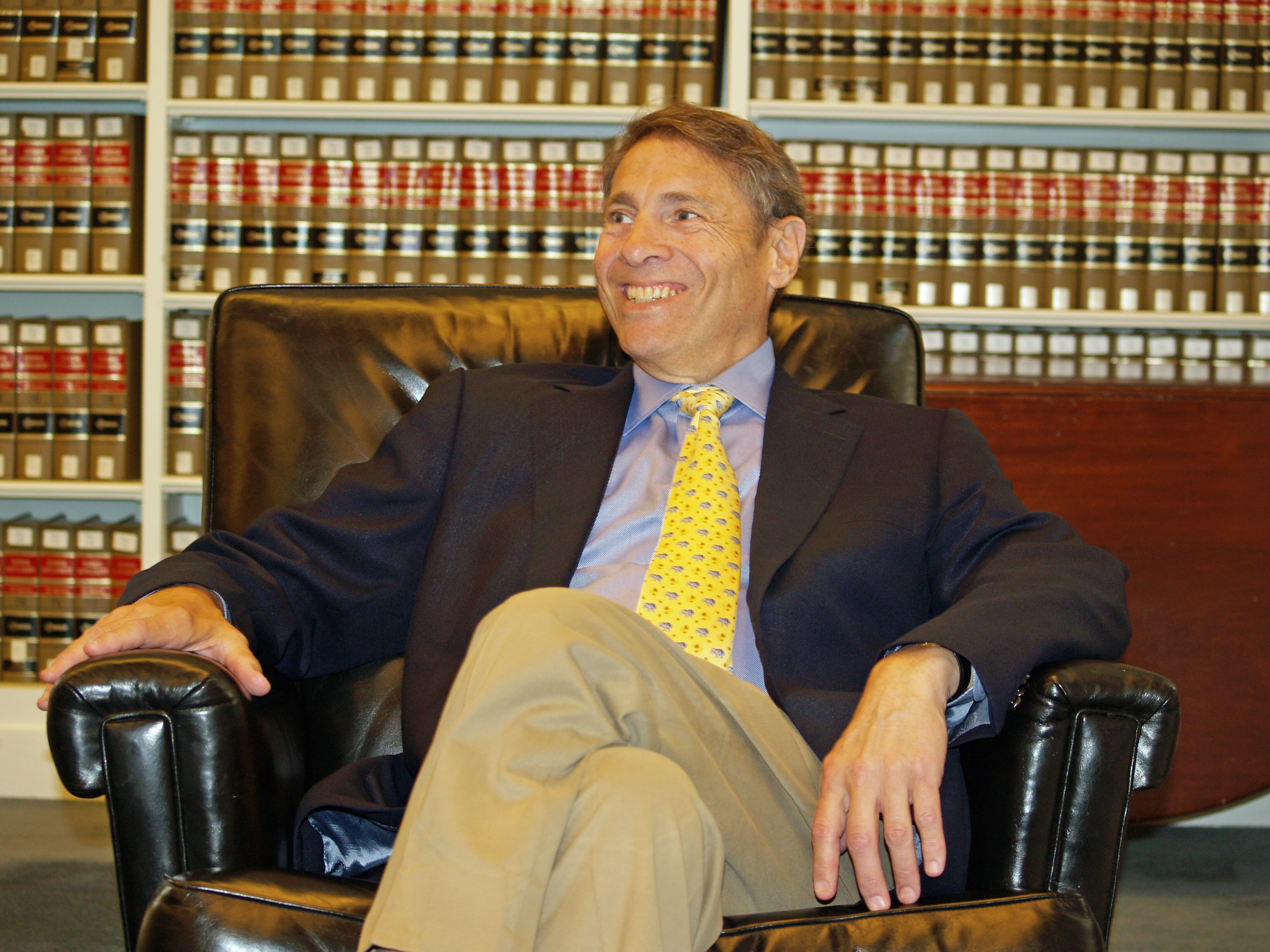
Michael E. Levine

Michael E. Levine (died February 3, 2017) was a "Distinguished Research Scholar" at the New York University School of Law. He made substantial contributions to the world of air transportation and its regulation as a senior airline executive, an academic and a government official. He retired from Northwest Airlines in 1999 to return to academic life.

== Background ==
Levine held a BA degree from Reed College (1962) and an LLB degree from Yale Law School (1965). He did graduate work in economics at Yale and the University of Chicago.

== Airline executive ==
As an airline executive, Levine served at Continental Airlines (1981–82) and Northwest (1992–99) as an Executive Vice President and was President and CEO of New York Air (1982–84), guiding that post-deregulation startup airline to its first profit. At Northwest, he was principally responsible for the commercial strategy and activities of the company, and for developing and executing Northwest's pioneering alliance strategy, including its joint venture with KLM and its alliance with Continental. At Continental, he had similarly broad responsibilities and was principally responsible for the realignment of its Air Micronesia subsidiary to serve Japan.

== Academic ==
As an academic, he was an early advocate of interdisciplinary studies in law and economics and political science. A student of Nobel laureate Ronald H. Coase at the University of Chicago and of Robert H. Bork, Ward S. Bowman and Friedrich Kessler at Yale, Levine established an innovative program in law and social sciences at Caltech and U.S.C., while holding professorships at both institutions. He served as Dean of the Yale School of Management (SOM) (1988–92) and held professorial chairs at Caltech (1973-1984), Yale (1987-1992) and USC. He has also been a member of the law faculties at Harvard (1999–2002) and Yale (2002–2005) and has been an academic visitor at MIT, the London School of Economics, the Interdisciplinary Center of Hertzliya Israel, the University of Virginia and Duke University. Levine has done pioneering research on airline deregulation, on the application of market mechanisms to airport congestion, on committees and agendas and on the origins of regulation, regulatory capture, and the behavior of regulatory agencies. His 1965 Yale Law Journal article noting the superior performance of the California intrastate airline system to advocate deregulation of the Federal system was the first modern publication to advocate airline deregulation. Levine and this article were among the important sources relied on by then-professor Stephen Breyer when organizing the 1975 hearings on airline deregulation for Senator Ted Kennedy. It was extensively cited by Alfred E. Kahn in his monumental treatise on regulation, The Economics of Regulation and prompted Kahn to name Levine the senior staffer at the Civil Aeronautics Board (CAB) when Kahn became Chairman in 1977 with a mandate to deregulate to the maximum extent possible.

== Government ==
As a government official, Levine was instrumental in bringing about airline deregulation. In 1978 and 1979, he served as General Director, International and Domestic Aviation, (the senior staff position at the U.S. Civil Aeronautics Board) and devised many of the mechanisms and practices used to deregulate the industry. He also served as a member of the Aviation Safety Commission, established by Congress in 1986 to evaluate airline safety since deregulation.

== Recognition ==
Levine was named among the ten most influential pioneers in the history of commercial aviation by Airfinance Journal, received the Transportation Research Foundation’s Distinguished Transportation Researcher award for lifetime achievement, and was the recipient of the CAB’s Distinguished Service Award.

== Controversy ==
Levine's Yale SOM deanship generated some controversy that was covered fairly extensively by the media. When Levine became dean, Yale's SOM was unable to attract a dean with a national reputation. President Benno Schmidt was under pressure from the Yale Corporation to change it or close it. He recruited Levine, a regularly appointed holder of a professorial chair who was already a member of the SOM faculty, as dean. Together they made changes that infuriated some faculty, although they were supported by others. The aggrieved faculty and some student and alumni supporters publicly resisted the changes.

== Death ==
Levine died February 3, 2017.
