= Frank Lorenzo =

American airline executive and corporate raider (born 1940)

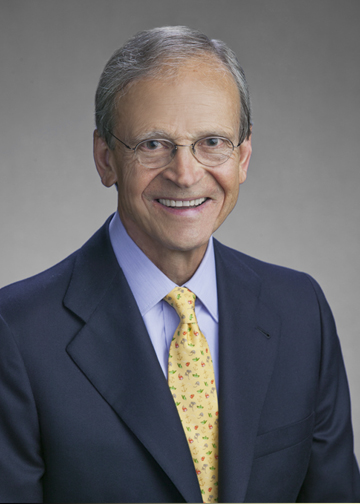
- Frank Lorenzo in 2012
- Born: Francisco Anthony Lorenzo; May 19, 1940 (age 86); New York City, United States
- Education: Columbia University; Harvard Business School
- Occupations: Businessman, former airline executive
- Spouse: Sharon Neill Murray
- Children: 4

Francisco Anthony "Frank" Lorenzo (born May 19, 1940) is an American businessman and former airline executive who played a prominent role in the U.S. airline industry during the era of deregulation in the 1970s and 1980s. Through his holding company, Texas Air Corporation, Lorenzo gained control of Texas International Airlines, Continental Airlines, New York Air, People Express, Frontier Airlines, and Eastern Air Lines.

Lorenzo became known for cost reductions and restructuring strategies. In 1983, Continental Airlines filed for Chapter 11 bankruptcy during a prolonged dispute with its unions. The bankruptcy allowed Continental to reject existing labor agreements and institute lower wages and new work rules. Labor unions argued that the filing was intended to void their contracts, while Continental maintained that its labor costs made reorganization necessary. Continental returned to operating profitability in 1984 and remained under bankruptcy protection until 1986, after reaching an agreement with creditors to repay 100% of its debt.

Texas Air acquired Eastern Air Lines in 1986 following a period of financial difficulties and disputes between Eastern and its unions. Lorenzo's subsequent management of Eastern, including transfers of assets among Texas Air subsidiaries, became controversial. Organized labor and some government officials argued that the restructuring weakened Eastern, while Lorenzo and Texas Air maintained that restructuring was necessary to address the airline's financial condition. Eastern filed for bankruptcy in 1989 and ceased operations in 1991. In a subsequent proceeding concerning ATX, a new airline startup in which Lorenzo was involved, the U.S. Department of Transportation, after extensive pleading by the national airline unions, found Lorenzo unfit to exercise control over an airline and rejected ATX's application.

Since 1990, Lorenzo has been chairman of Savoy Capital, Inc., an asset management and venture capital firm. He has served as a trustee for The Hispanic Society of America since 2005.

== Early life ==
Born to Spanish immigrants Olegario Lorenzo (died 1980) and Ana (née Mateos, died 2008), Lorenzo grew up in Queens, New York. His father was a long-time beauty salon proprietor in Manhattan; his mother worked as a hairdresser at their beauty salon.

=== Public high school, Columbia and Harvard Business School ===
Lorenzo attended Forest Hills High School and then worked his way through Columbia University, holding several jobs, including at Macy's as a salesperson and Coca-Cola as a truck driver and member of the Teamsters Union. He graduated in 1961 with a B. A. degree in economics, followed by an MBA from Harvard Business School in 1963, as he was turning 23.

=== Jobs at TWA, Eastern, and the Army ===
Lorenzo's first professional jobs, from 1963–1966, were at Trans World Airlines, as a Senior Analyst, and then at Eastern Airlines, as Manager of Financial Analysis. He also spent six months in the Army reserve in 1964, and then returned to his job in New York.

=== Lorenzo, Carney & Co. ===
Despite having only three years of professional experience, in 1966, he setup Lorenzo & Carney, Inc., a financial advisory firm specializing in airlines, with Robert J. Carney, who had also attended Harvard Business School. Their first offices were atop the Pan Am Building in New York. The firm's first significant transaction was arranging the 1966 sale of Zantop Air Transport, a supplemental air carrier, to new owners, creating Universal Airlines. This provided the nascent company with its first significant income and credibility. Later, the firm participated in the refinancing of British West Indian Airlines (BWIA).

=== Jet Capital ===
Lorenzo and Carney later formed Jet Capital Corporation in 1969, initially as an aircraft leasing company. Jet Capital raised $1.5 million in a public stock offering, and was later asked by Chase Manhattan Bank to attempt a refinancing plan for Texas International Airlines (TIA) as an alternative to bankruptcy, as the airline was in default on its aircraft bank loans. Jet Capital put together a refinancing and equity infusion for Texas International Airlines in 1971.

== Early airline career ==
=== Texas International Airlines ===
As part of the refinancing plan for Texas International Airlines (TIA), Jet Capital acquired control of TIA in 1972, and received 26% of TIA's equity interest and 59% of its voting power for $1.15 million. Lorenzo became its president and Carney its executive vice president in August 1972. The deal was approved by the Civil Aeronautics Board (CAB), which regulated the airline industry in the United States at the time, after a contentious CAB approval process fought with Howard Hughes, who at the time controlled Hughes Airwest.

When Lorenzo took control of TIA in 1972, it was on the verge of financial collapse, having lost money since 1966. Two years later, Lorenzo's management was able to steer the company to break even due to significant streamlining of operations. Some years later an analyst from Oppenheimer & Company, citing Lorenzo and business-partner Carney's strategies of substituting obsolete planes with jets, eliminating unprofitable routes in exchange for destinations with higher demand, and instituting half-price fares which they called "peanuts-fares" as a promotional name for the first time in the airline business. This brought out TIA's ability to compete and win against much larger and financially stronger companies. TIA also had to compete with a new-at-the-time Texas intrastate airline, Southwest Airlines, which flew on many of TIA's routes and which was union-free then and had much lower costs.

Lorenzo's management changed the character of the airline, having revamped its fleet, increased utilization, cut costs and dropped many losing routes, while adding flights on strong segments. The average trip distance per passenger boarded jumped 25% from 1972 to 1976. In 1977, the company earned $8 million, and in 1978, TIA's reported net income was up to $13.2 million and it was described as an "aggressive, innovative carrier".

TIA implemented in 1977, just before the advent of airline deregulation, the first unrestricted airline low fares, which were called "Peanut Fares." The success of this promotion drove major improvement in TIA's financial position. In his book on aviation history, author R.E.G. Davies refers to these fares as "...a watershed in airline passenger tariffs." Also in 1977, TIA was the first to develop and implement a forerunner to the frequent flyer programs of today, which were called Payola Passes - coupons based on flight segments.

=== Airline takeover attempts ===
==== National Airlines ====
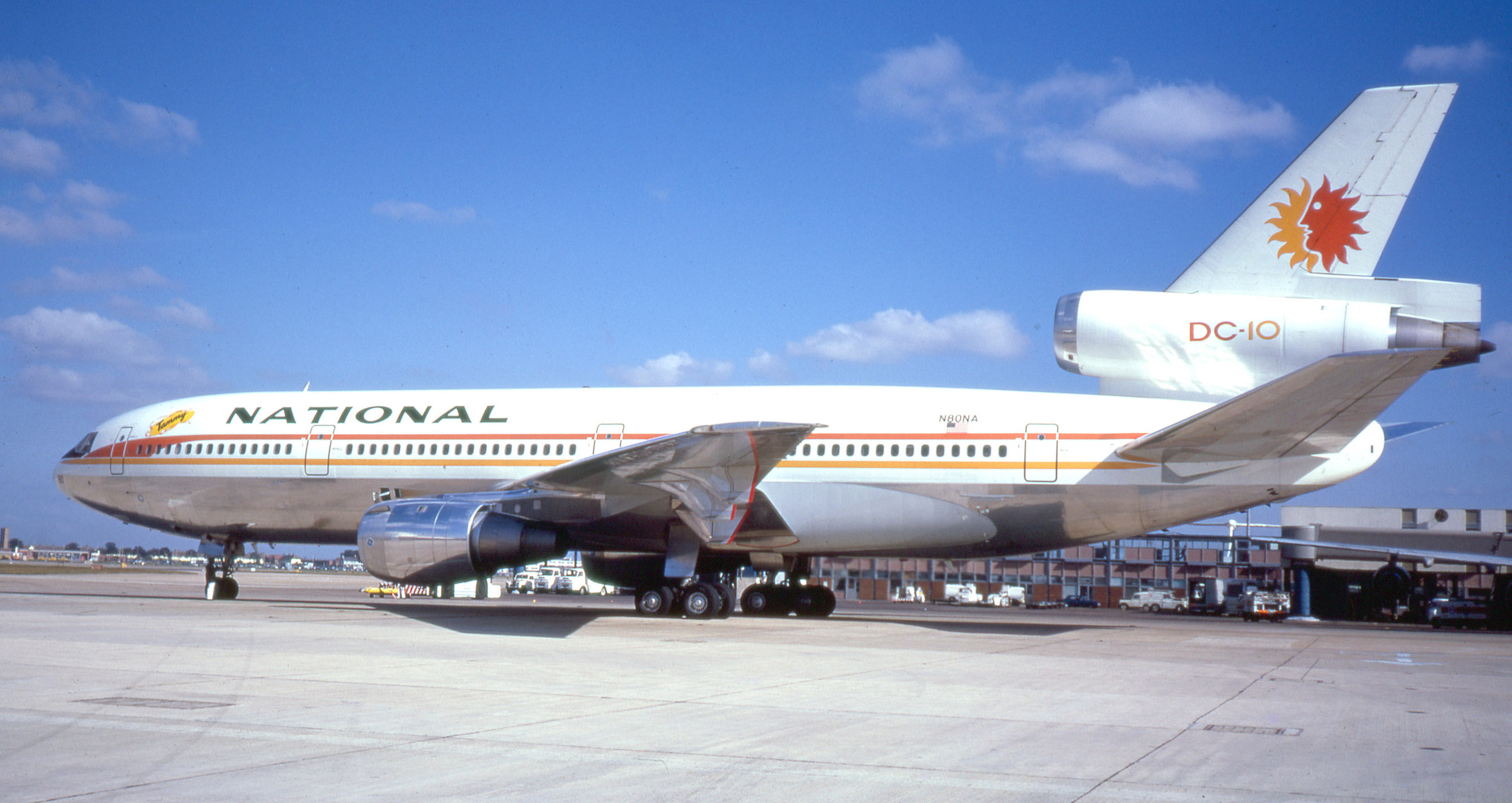
A McDonnell Douglas DC-10 of National Airlines at London Heathrow Airport in 1974.

In 1978, the airline world was astonished to learn that Lorenzo (TIA) had moved to take over National Airlines, a domestic trunk airline three times its size, having purchased 9.2% of the stock of National Airlines, becoming the first airline to buy up shares of another airline as a prelude to a possible takeover.

For several weeks starting in June 1978, Texas International Air had acquired shares of National Airlines, filing documents with the U.S. Securities and Exchange Commission when its stake reached just short of the 10% that would require prior approval of the Civil Aeronautics Board (CAB). TIA was reported at the time to be studying the "possibility of seeking control" of National. Several weeks later, TIA announced intentions to buy up to 25% of National's stock, and requested approval from the CAB to acquire the stock and direct control of National. TIA's attempted takeover of the much larger National "surprised a lot of people", because National was so much larger than TIA at the time and no airline had ever attempted an "unfriendly" takeover of another airline before. Lorenzo's management team viewed National's stock as significantly undervaluing the assets of the company, and the move was financial in addition to being strategic and aimed at combining the routes of the two airlines.

A competing offer for control of National was submitted to the CAB by Pan Am, and National ultimately agreed to be acquired by Pan Am; these actions drove up the price of National's stock. The CAB gave TIA and Pan Am each permission to acquire up to 25% of National's shares, and the two companies acquired 45% of the shares in total. The management and directors of National, as a group, owned less than 5% of the outstanding shares. In December, Eastern Airlines also joined the bidding for National. TIA and Pan Am considered the bid a "ploy to block their own chances" of completing the deal, but Eastern chairman Frank Borman called the offer serious.

In April 1979, the United States Department of Justice and the United States Department of Transportation both announced opposition to a merger of Eastern and National on the grounds that the merger would be anti-competitive. In July, the CAB said it "would not stand in the way of airline mergers that appear to benefit the public". National accepted the Pan Am offer and did not submit TIA's offer to its shareholders, which rendered the TIA offer "effectively dead". TIA agreed to sell its shares in National to Pan Am, earning TIA a net profit on the merger attempt of approximately $46 million.

==== TWA in 1980 and 1985 ====
With a large amount of cash on hand, observers said that TIA was likely to begin another acquisition attempt quickly, to preclude becoming a takeover target itself. TIA did exactly that, accumulating shares of Trans World Airlines (TWA), an even bigger target than National. TWA had airline revenues about 14 times those of TIA, and the total revenue of TWA's parent corporation, Trans World Corp., was 20 times TIA's. TIA's plan was to merge TIA with the TWA subsidiary of Trans World Corp., providing it with smaller feed aircraft and a feed network.

TWA was opposed to the merger; its board "unanimously affirmed" publicly that TWA was not for sale. After accumulating more than 4% of Trans World's stock, TIA eventually backed out of the proposed deal, selling all of its holdings by January 1980.

In 1985, Lorenzo's team again sought TWA as a merger partner. This time they were approached by the management of TWA as a "white knight" against the threatened acquisition of TWA by Carl Icahn, who was feared by TWA management and employees. Lorenzo signed a formal contract for the acquisition of TWA in June 1985. However, Icahn pressed on with his acquisition attempt after he received the backing of TWA's pilot union who promised major cost cuts.

In August 1985, the TWA board voted to cede the company to Icahn who didn't require any government approval, while Lorenzo's airline would, since airline acquisitions of another airline still required DOT approval.

=== Formation of Texas Air as holding company of group ===
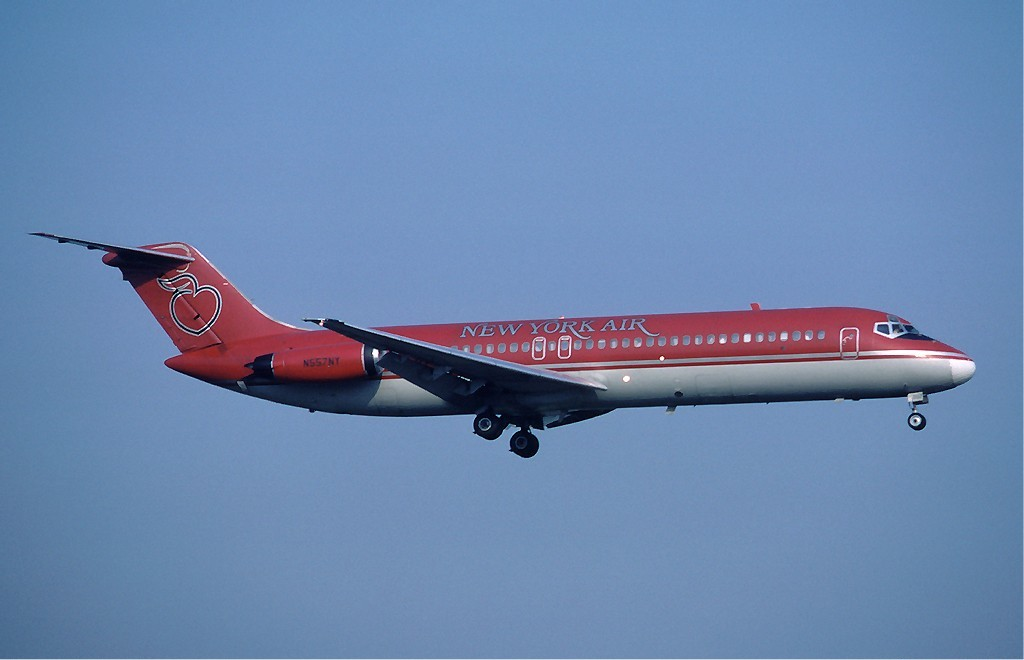
DC-9-32 of New York Air

Lorenzo restructured TIA in 1980, forming a holding company called Texas Air Corp, which was controlled by Jet Capital, as TIA had been. Texas Air owned TIA and had cash holdings of about $100 million, which Lorenzo said would be used primarily for investments in the airline industry. It was the first airline to restructure into a holding company. Almost all airlines followed.

=== Startup of New York Air as separate sub in New York ===
Later in 1980, Texas Air formed a new airline, New York Air, with $25 million in capital. Lorenzo was the chairman of the new company, which was to fly shuttle flights between New York La Guardia, the airline's hub, and Boston-Logan, and Washington-National Airports. Plans included expansion to several cities in the Northeast.

New York Air planned to win customers by charging lower fares and providing better service and roomier seats than the dominant carrier between New York and Washington, Eastern Airlines, which responded by offering lower fares. Pan Am, which had announced competing service after New York Air's formation, also lowered its fares.

The formation of New York Air was opposed by the unions of Texas International Airlines, who were upset that employees were being hired with pay rates substantially lower than union rates at TIA; in the case of pilots, the rate was about half of the union rate. The unions felt the company was set up specifically to "sidestep longstanding labor contracts with organized employees" and that the jobs should have been offered to TIA employees. The pilots' union planned a $1 million protest campaign and a boycott of companies that did business with Texas Air, the parent company, but the campaign was unsuccessful and was called off because of the 1981 air traffic controllers' strike.

New York Air, independently managed away from the other airline subs, expanded in the 1980s to new cities and was successful in building a strong presence in the profitable Northeast shuttle markets.

== Continental Airlines ==
=== Purchase ===
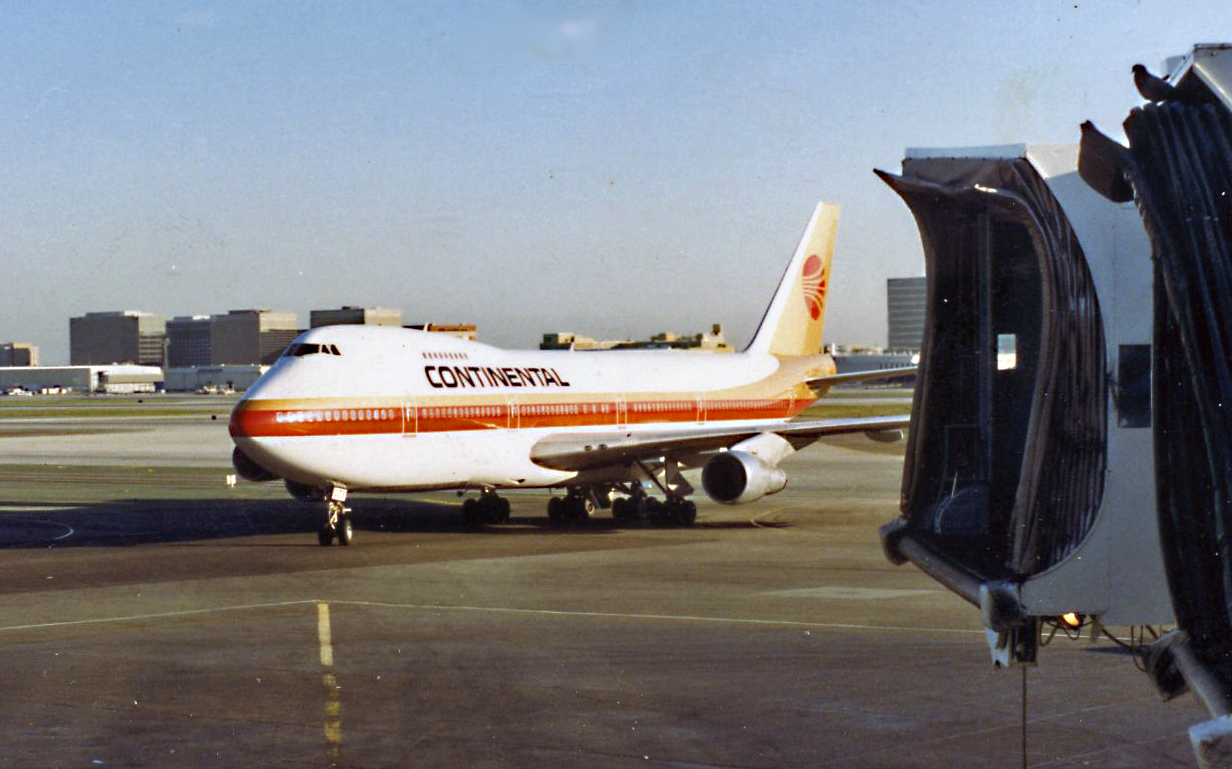
Continental Boeing 747 at Los Angeles in 1987.

Continental Airlines (CAL) had been on TIA's potential merger screen for quite a while. CAL had been losing money regularly and seemed not to have developed an effective strategy to deal with airline deregulation and the new competition that it brought. Its western oriented route structure fit well with TIA's network. Lorenzo made two attempts to merge the companies on a friendly basis, but was rejected by its long-time Chairman Bob Six.

In January 1981, Texas International Airlines announced an offer to buy Continental. It had already purchased just over 9% of Continental's shares, and offered to buy enough to bring its stake to between 35% and 49%, the first airline to seek another through a stock tender offer. Continental already had an agreement to merge with Western Airlines, and Texas Air announced that it would seek to vote its shares to block the merger which it felt was not in the interests of CAL shareholders. As with previous attempts, TIA's takeover target was a much larger company than itself.

There was opposition to TIA's planned takeover. In particular, unions feared that Lorenzo would lay off workers and that he was anti-union, demonstrated by formation of New York Air as a non-unionized company, charges which Lorenzo denied by making clear the employees had the right to select union representation should they have so desired. While TIA acquired 49% of Continental's shares, an employee group attempted to stop the plan through legal maneuvers designed to give them control of the company rather than sell to TIA. Continental's chairman, Alvin Feldman, objected to the purchase, telling Lorenzo that he thought the combined company would be "very weak"; as the takeover battle continued, Feldman was described as being "bitterly opposed" to the plan.

The financing for the employee group's planned purchase fell through, and as Continental was preparing a public announcement, Feldman committed suicide in his Los Angeles office. TIA received approval for its purchase from the CAB, and President Ronald Reagan did not block the deal. The legal battles between the two companies ended in November, with Lorenzo and two associates elected to the board of directors of Continental.

1981 was a financially difficult year for Texas International, New York Air, and Continental. Lorenzo claimed, and some analysts agreed, that Continental's problems were worse than they had appeared before his purchase of the airline. Continental's losses for 1981 were over $100 million, and an economic recession further hurt Continental's finances. It attempted to renegotiate contracts with several unions.

A series of steps to combine TIA and Continental followed. Lorenzo consolidated the historic TIA Houston as part of a plan to combine the routes of TIA and Continental in a hub and spoke system centered in Houston and Denver. Continental moved its annual meeting from May to March 1982; at that meeting, Lorenzo was named chairman of Continental. In July, Continental and Texas Air approved a "financial merger" of the companies, although operations were still to remain separate. In September, the employees of both Texas International and Continental were informed that there would be "operational and management integration of the two companies effective Oct. 31 [1982]". Although Texas Air remained the parent company, the combined companies operated under the Continental name, brand, and aircraft livery.

=== Strike and bankruptcy ===
After 19 months of negotiations, Continental and its mechanics' union failed to reach a labor agreement, and the mechanics went on strike in August 1983. Continental continued to operate, primarily because a majority of mechanics crossed the picket lines and partially by hiring replacement mechanics. Continental continued to lose money significantly due to its cost structure, and management gave a final proposal to its pilots which provided for ownership by the pilots and other employees of 35% of the company's stock, but with the plan rejected, the company filed for Chapter 11 bankruptcy protection from creditors on Saturday evening, September 24, 1983, laying off 65% of its employees. Following the bankruptcy filing, the pilots' union went on strike to protest lower wages being offered by the company. The bankruptcy filing allowed Continental to void union contracts. It returned to operating profitability in 1984, but remained under bankruptcy protection until 1986, after working out plans with creditors to repay 100% of its debt over a period of 10 years.

During the bankruptcy, Continental claimed that its labor costs were too high and would force the company out of business completely if left unchanged. The unions claimed the bankruptcy was simply a legal maneuver intended to void contracts. The company trimmed operations and expenses during the reorganization, cutting one-third of its employees, introducing new wage rates and work rules for its employees, thus voiding the old Union contracts. The average salary of Continental's pilots after the bankruptcy filing was 30% to 50% lower than before the filing. Senior Management also reduced their salaries to those of the pilots. Continental was the first airline to largely gradually replace a pilot workforce. The pilots eventually voted their union out.

=== Expansion after the New Continental is "born" ===
The "New Continental" began emerging while in bankruptcy. With its cost structure in line with any post deregulation upstart carrier, the airline began competing effectively with legacy carriers. By May 1984, Continental was operating 83 of its 105 aircraft, which had been mostly grounded upon filing for bankruptcy. Though operating near capacity, it was doing so with nearly half the 12,000 employees, on half the average wage cost, than prior to bankruptcy. By the summer of 1984, the Lorenzo team had filled many of the positions downsized during the strike, and employment had reached 9,000 with a route system that served 67 destinations. Planes were averaging a 67% load factor, amongst the highest in the industry. New Continental's low-cost carrier strategy was beginning to bear fruit.

In February 1984, Continental received a favorable ruling from Bankruptcy Judge R.F. Wheless Jr. who ruled that "Continental was justified in rejecting its [pilots’ union] contract it described as burdensome" and that it "had no choice but to file for reorganization." Continental's Lorenzo and his team had successfully argued that labor "costs would force the airline to liquidate."

In the second quarter of 1984, led by Lorenzo's team, Continental's restructuring showed more promise. The company reported a net profit of $10.4 million, which was a $36.9 million improvement from the $26.5 million loss during the same time period in 1983.

Further signs that the Lorenzo management team's new low-fare, high-frequency business model was working began to show. With all fares initially set at $49, the airline was able to compete with legacy carriers. It also put in place a stock ownership plan with a grant of 1 million shares, profit sharing and other new forms of compensation, including options to buy new stock to reward employees’ loyalty during and after the union strikes. Pioneering innovations in the industry, such as the self-service ticketing Flying Machines and Continental's partnership with Federal Express to provide overnight ticket delivery nationwide to customers, proved effective.

=== Emergence from Bankruptcy ===
By September 1984, Lorenzo's team had led the airline to surpass the number of seat miles flown prior to bankruptcy with 25% fewer employees. Though the airline was price competitive with new entry carriers, it still offered full services such as hot meals, checked baggage, a frequent flier program and code-sharing with partner airlines. Record profits of $30.3 million were reported for the third quarter in 1984. Continental had successfully transitioned from "a high-cost airline losing its proverbial shirt to being a low-cost carrier making good profits." In September 1986, the "New Continental" successfully emerged from bankruptcy as a lean, sustainable and profitable airline. Notably, Lorenzo's management team had reached agreement with its creditors to repay them at 100 cents-on-the-dollar with no equity dilution, a rarity in previous bankruptcies. Employees and management were issued equity and equity incentives.

=== Growth of Continental in the 1980s ===
Continental's rapid growth continued through the 1980s. It began service to Europe and added services to Asia, during this period, in addition to growing its operations domestically. In February 1987, Continental merged with the operations of People Express, which had been acquired, and New York Air expanding its route system. Severe service disruptions were experienced during this merger.

In 1987, Continental also inaugurated a major new hub operation at Newark Airport's Terminal C, with rights acquired in the People Express acquisition. SAS moved its operations to Newark, from JFK airport, in a joint service arrangement in 1988. Continental also made a major image change, currently in use, and eliminated first class service, giving business class passengers the same first class seats—this service was later to be marketed as Business First.

By 1989, Continental served 133 airports around the world, carried approximately 9% of US commercial air traffic and offered more than 1,250 daily departures.

== Eastern Air Lines ==
=== Background ===
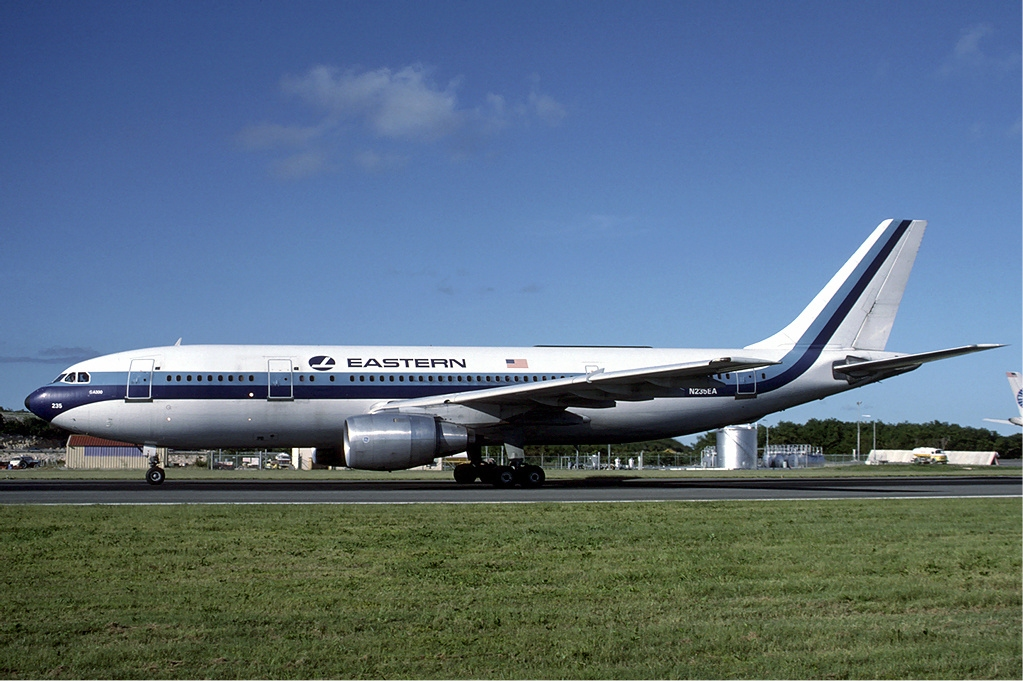
Eastern Airbus A300 at Sint Maarten in 1986.

In 1975, Frank Borman became president and CEO of Eastern Air Lines. It was ailing financially, and Borman negotiated concessions from its employees, but he also ordered expensive new airplanes. He also clashed frequently with the head of the machinists' union, Charlie Bryan. The atmosphere at Eastern was such that "[l]abor brawls struck Eastern with the regularity of tropical storms in Florida". (The company was later described as having been "anemic for most of the past 20 years" and as having "lurched from one financial crisis to another".)

=== Takeover ===
In December 1985, Borman met with Lorenzo to elicit possible Eastern interest. CAL had been looking to gain more critical mass and strategic assets. Then, in January 1986, Eastern faced another financial crisis and sought more concessions from its unions. Borman said that Eastern needed to "either get long term economic relief from its labor unions or enter bankruptcy and impose that relief, just as now-thriving Continental did under Frank Lorenzo in September 1983", but Eastern's machinists' union refused to renegotiate its contract. After Texas Air made an offer to buy Eastern, despite the unions' generally negative opinion of Lorenzo's tactics, union leader Bryan said, "it might be surprising the relationship that could develop between Lorenzo and our organization". Eastern established a deadline with its three major unions to grant concessions or have the company sold to Texas Air; when the deadline passed without the concessions, the Eastern sale was signed early Monday morning on March 24, 1986. Although there was more litigation to stop the deal, it was approved by shareholders in November 1986.

Phil Bakes, who had been president of Continental, was named president and chief executive officer of Eastern, in November 1986, and moved his family to Miami to assume direction of the airline. Lorenzo, appointed chairman, remained in Houston as Continental's CEO.

In December 1986, Texas Air also finalized a deal to acquire People Express Airlines, a low-cost airline that had been formed by eight executives who had left Texas Air in 1980. The deal included the assets of the bankrupt Frontier Airlines, which People Express had purchased in 1985. At that point, the combination of the airline companies controlled by Lorenzo through Texas Air accounted for 20% of the airline industry in the United States, and some estimates described it as the largest airline in the Western world, and second only to Aeroflot worldwide.

=== Asset transfers; Sale of shuttle to Donald Trump ===
In March 1987, Texas Air, realizing that Eastern's labor difficulties were hurting its computer system service sales to other airlines and also wanting to combine its other computer system assets, transferred Eastern's reservation system to a new subsidiary, System One. The transfer value was set at $100 million based on investment banking opinions, although it was substantially below some value estimates of $200 million to $400 million. Eastern then paid fees to lease back the system. The system was combined with Texas Air's other computer system assets and grew to have 5,100 travel agent customers. Texas Air later sold half of its interest in the system to Electronic Data Systems, based on an overall system value of $250 million.

In early 1988, with Eastern's cash being consumed by its losses, discussions began with Donald Trump and others to buy the Eastern Shuttle. Lorenzo had contacted Trump as a logical buyer, who importantly wouldn't have provided the competitive threat of one of the major airlines—who were not contacted. The negotiations with Trump stretched on for several months, and most all of the negotiations were between Trump and Lorenzo in the Edwardian Room of the Plaza Hotel, in New York, which Trump had just bought in early 1988. An agreement was finally reached in October 1988, for Trump to buy Eastern's shuttle service for $365 million, wanting to rebrand it as Trump Shuttle. The deal was closed in June 1989 and Trump went into the airline business.

Donald Trump had much to say about buying the shuttle and negotiations with Lorenzo in his 1990 book: Trump, Surviving at the Top. In it he discussed the union fights at Eastern and the making of Lorenzo as a symbol. He said, "through it all, Frank just kept quiet and took the heat. In life, most people are big talk and no action. Frank is that rare person who is all action and no talk." Trump also wrote that "the funny thing is, I found Frank, man-to-man to be a very different guy from the reclusive, evil maniac you read about in the business press. I met with him numerous times... and invariably found him relaxed, charming, and compassionate, despite his feelings about the union leaders [at Eastern]. Frank is also a devoted family man who cares very deeply about his wife, Sharon, and their children." Trump went on to lose the Trump Shuttle in September 1990, when the difficult economic times and large debt positions caused a default on Trump's debt to a Citibank led group. The banking group leased the airline to US Air in late 1990, which promptly took off the Trump name.

=== Labor strike and resulting decline in service ===
Due to management and the unions' ongoing battle over labor contracts, service at the airline declined resulting in a series of increasingly contentious and politically charged events. In April 1988, the United States Department of Transportation began an inquiry into the financial fitness and safety of Texas Air and Eastern; the inquiry, which was spurred by Eastern's pilots union, was announced at the same time as a fine of $823,000 levied by the FAA for safety violations, all of which occurred prior to Texas Air's role. Texas Air and Eastern's operations were vindicated when the inquiry deemed Texas Air to have passed its tests and added that labor disputes "could endanger safety at Eastern".

After negotiations with the three unions failed to produce any labor agreements, a mandated 30-day cooling off period began on 1 February 1989. If an agreement could not be reached, strikes would begin on 4 March 1989. During this period, Lorenzo and Phil Bakes, Eastern's CEO, met with several potential buyers of Eastern, including Carl Icahn, Jay Pritzker and Peter Ueberroth, but no deal materialized.

On 3 March 1989, President George H. W. Bush issued a statement outlining his decision not to act on a National Mediation Board recommendation to appoint a presidential emergency board to attempt to reach a labor agreement with machinists, which had been impossible for many years before Texas Air's acquisition. After the IAM struck, flight attendants, and the pilot union honored the IAM picket lines, and thousands of Eastern flights were canceled, and also thousands of employees were laid off.

=== Bankruptcy and shutdown ===
Eastern filed for bankruptcy protection on 9 March 1989. However, the law had been changed since Continental's bankruptcy in 1983 and it was much more difficult to void union contracts in a bankruptcy. Eastern continued to operate a reduced schedule, using pilots who crossed picket lines. By November, it claimed it was back on the road toward profitability and asked for more time to submit a reorganization plan to the bankruptcy court.

After Bush declined to appoint an emergency board to mediate the labor dispute, Congress passed a compromise bill designed to establish a bi-partisan commission specifically to "investigate the labor dispute" at Eastern, but it was vetoed by Bush on 21 November 1989. The following day, the pilots' union voted to end its strike, after about 800 of its members had crossed picket lines, and many others had taken early retirement or gone to work for other airlines. The flight attendants ended their strike the following day, but the machinists continued to strike.

Although Eastern was still operating, it was still losing money and proposed plans to its unsecured creditors that called for payment of 50% of the debt, and as conditions worsened, only 25% of the debt. Unable to reach agreement with Eastern, creditors requested that a trustee be appointed. The bankruptcy court agreed to the request and named a trustee, Martin Shugrue, to run Eastern in April 1990, with the goal of continuing to operate the company and find a buyer. With the trustee unable to bring the airline to profitability, Eastern ceased operations on 18 January 1991 and its assets were liquidated.

== Airline legacy ==
Lorenzo's record in the airline industry remains controversial. During his tenure, his companies introduced lower fares, reduced operating costs and restructured airlines facing increased competition following deregulation. Critics, particularly organized labor, strongly opposed many of his labor and restructuring strategies.

Lorenzo took control of Texas International Airlines in 1972 when the airline was experiencing significant financial difficulties and had lost money since 1966. After streamlining operations, changing routes and modernizing its fleet, the airline reached break-even within two years and subsequently became profitable. Texas International also introduced its unrestricted "Peanut Fares" in 1977, which aviation historian R.E.G. Davies described as "a watershed in airline passenger tariffs."

At Continental Airlines, Lorenzo's use of Chapter 11 to restructure labor agreements became one of the most controversial aspects of his career. Labor unions argued that the bankruptcy was used to avoid existing contracts, while Continental maintained that its labor costs threatened the airline's viability. Continental returned to operating profitability in 1984 and emerged from bankruptcy in 1986 after reaching an agreement with creditors to repay its debt in full.

Lorenzo's management of Eastern Air Lines was similarly controversial. Eastern had experienced financial difficulties and longstanding labor disputes before its acquisition by Texas Air in 1986. Eastern chairman Frank Borman had sought additional labor concessions and warned that the airline needed long-term economic relief or could face bankruptcy. Following the acquisition, asset transfers among Texas Air subsidiaries and continuing labor disputes became sources of significant criticism. Eastern filed for bankruptcy in 1989 and ceased operations in 1991.

Assessments of Lorenzo's airline career have therefore focused both on the financial and competitive changes implemented at airlines under his control and on the substantial controversy surrounding his labor relations and restructuring methods.

== Investment career ==
=== Departure from Continental and establishment of Savoy Capital ===
Lorenzo had been CEO for Continental and Texas International for 18 years, when he sold through Jet Capital his controlling interest in Continental Airlines in 1990 to Scandinavian Airlines System (SAS), and stepped down from his CEO role to pursue other entrepreneurial and investment ventures. Lorenzo's departure from Continental was a basic part of the deal, required by both Lorenzo and SAS, although he remained a director of Continental for two years afterwards as part of the arrangements with SAS. During his eighteen-year tenure, his airline empire grew from 15 jet aircraft (at Texas International) with revenues of $73 million, to Continental's combined fleet of 350 jet aircraft and revenues of over $5 billion.

After the sale of his interest in Continental, Lorenzo founded Savoy Capital, Inc. in 1990 in Houston, TX. Savoy is a private investment firm largely investing for its own account, both on a liquid basis and privately, but which also has invested on behalf of accredited outside investors.

=== ATX, Inc. ===
In 1992, a company in which Lorenzo was a significant shareholder, but not part of management, ATX Inc., attempted to start a low-cost airline serving the east coast of the United States. A regulatory application by ATX, strongly fought by organized labor, was rejected by the U.S. Department of Transportation in 1993; the agency said that under Lorenzo's supervision, Eastern Airlines and Texas Air had "experienced operational, maintenance and labor-related problems that were among the most serious in the history of U.S. aviation." Lorenzo had previously reduced his stake in the company to 24 percent and said that he would only serve on its board.

== Philanthropy ==
Lorenzo is a long-time trustee of The Hispanic Society of America, an institution with a free-entrance museum of art located in New York City. It houses the largest collection of Spanish art outside Spain, with major paintings by Velázquez, Goya, Zurbarán, El Greco, and Sorolla. He is additionally a trustee emeritus of the Woodrow Wilson National Fellowship Foundation located in Princeton, New Jersey. Lorenzo and his wife are involved as a director, donor, or advisor to a number of other arts and charitable organizations.

In 1986, Lorenzo established the Olegario Lorenzo Memorial and Lorenzo Family Scholarship Funds at Columbia College.

== Personal ==
Lorenzo married Sharon Neill (née Murray) in 1972, and has four children. His wife is an adjunct professor at University of Pennsylvania law school, where she teaches a course in art law.

== Published works ==
- Lorenzo, Frank (2024). Flying for Peanuts. Skyhorse Publishing. ISBN 9781510781665.
