= Robert Six =

American businessman (1907–1986)

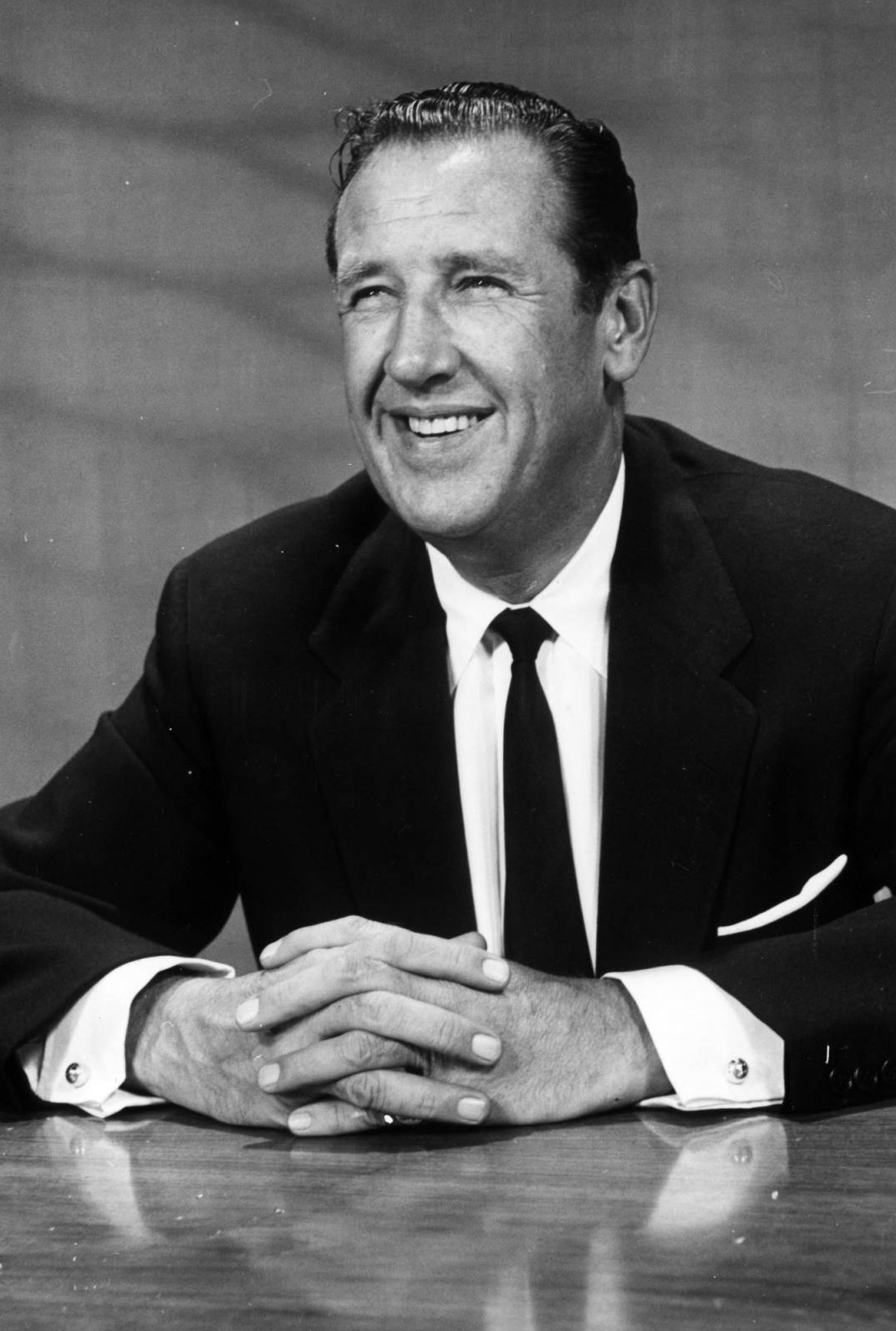
- Six, c.. 1950–1960
- Born: Robert Forman Six; June 25, 1907; Stockton, California, U.S.
- Died: October 6, 1986 (aged 79); Beverly Hills, California, U.S.
- Occupations: CEO, Continental Airlines, 1936–1981
- Spouses: Ethel Merman (m. 1953; div. 1960) Audrey Meadows (m. 1961)

Robert Forman Six (June 25, 1907 – October 6, 1986) was an American businessman who was the CEO of Continental Airlines from 1936 to 1980. Beginning his career in the early days of commercial aviation in the United States, he became the CEO of Continental Airlines, a major contemporary airline.

According to Maverick: The Story of Robert F. Six and Continental Airlines, "Six was one of the last members of the group of innovators, pioneers, and visionaries (including Juan Trippe, William A. Patterson, Jack Frye, C.R. Smith, and Eddie Rickenbacker) who built the U.S. airline industry into what it is today." During Six's time with the airline, Continental grew from a small, three-stop operation into a major global airline with services spanning the U.S., Canada, Europe, Asia-Pacific, and Latin America.

== Early years ==
Six was born in Stockton, California, and graduated from Weber Grammar School before dropping out of high school at age 17.

He started his business career in sales for a public utility company but was fired for taking flying lessons on company time. Six learned to fly in an Alexander Eaglerock biplane with an OX-5 engine. After about 10 hours of flight time, he received a pilot's license (number 5772) in 1929 at the age of 22. That same year, he bought an OX-5-powered Travel Air biplane from Walter Beech and established the Valley Flying Service. This service sold scenic rides to passengers and was used to race on weekends.

Although many credit Six with founding Continental Airlines, Walter Varney and Louis Mueller established it in 1934 as Varney Speed Lines. Mueller gained control of the carrier in 1936 and sold 40% of the company to Six. In July 1937, Six changed the name of Varney Speed Lines to Continental Airlines. The carrier moved its headquarters to Denver, Colorado, which served as the airline's central hub for the next 45 years.

== World War II and the postwar years ==
Under Robert Six's leadership in the 1940s and 1950s, Continental Airlines expanded its aircraft fleet using profits from World War II. During this war, Six contracted for the airline to provide air transportation to the military, train aircrews, and perform military aircraft modification work at its Denver maintenance facilities. Six served as a lieutenant colonel during the war in the United States Army Air Corps and later as a reserve officer in charge of his airline's bomber modification center. He also helped improve routes to ferry American aircraft to the European theater, significantly reducing aircraft losses due to weather. Before the war ended, he returned to Continental and resumed his leadership role.

In 1951, Six met actress and singer Ethel Merman; they married in 1953, and settled in Cherry Hills Village, Colorado. Merman's son, Bob Levitt Jr., recounted that life with Six became oppressive. According to Levitt, he and his mother, sister, and elderly grandparents suffered emotional and physical violence from a regularly explosive Six, who was called "Big Meanie" by his stepchildren. Merman found Denver's society rural and limited compared to New York. Six and Merman divorced in 1960. From Six's perspective, Merman had failed him by not becoming a public relations prop for Continental.

== Dramatic expansion and move to Los Angeles ==
By the end of the 1950s, Continental Airlines had seen a broad expansion of its routes. In 1957, it flew for the first time from Chicago to Los Angeles (both non-stop and via Denver), and from Denver and Los Angeles to Kansas City. Continental was one of the first operators of the Boeing 707, taking its first delivery of 707s in the spring of 1959. Six, unsatisfied with jet service alone, significantly improved the airline's services, described as "nothing short of luxurious" by the Los Angeles Times, and "clearly, the finest in the airline industry" by the Chicago Tribune.

In 1961, Six married Hollywood star Audrey Meadows of The Honeymooners television fame after meeting her in Honolulu, who became an advisory board member and exerted some influence on Continental's in-flight and ground services. The Six family was socially prominent in Beverly Hills, California, where they lived, and their social circle included various Hollywood stars.

== Triumph and loss ==
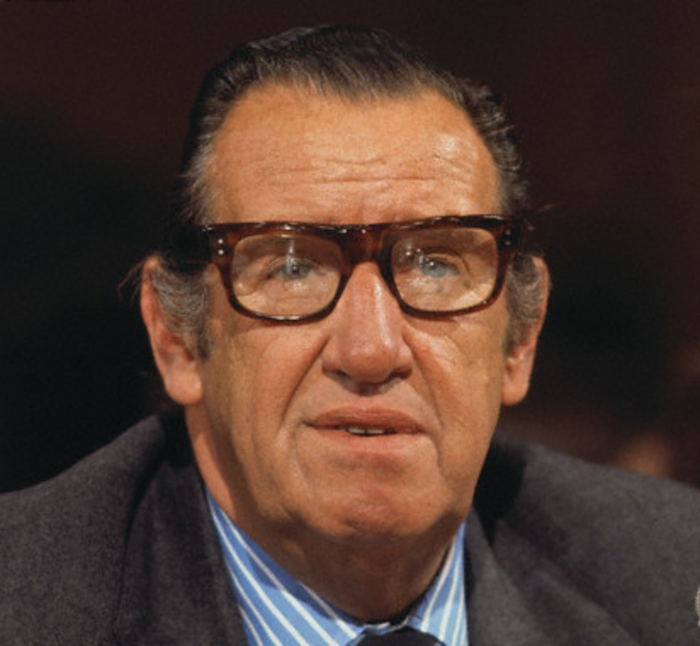
Six in 1978, Los Angeles

After the Airline Deregulation Act of 1978, Continental expanded rapidly, along with other U.S. carriers. By the time of Six's death in 1986, the airline he pioneered had become one of the largest airlines in the United States.

Six died in his sleep at his home in Beverly Hills, California, on October 6, 1986.

== Legacy and honors ==
In 1971, Six was nominated and inducted into the Colorado Aviation Hall of Fame.

In June 1974, Six was awarded an honorary doctorate by the University of Colorado at Boulder. He was the 1977 recipient of the Tony Jannus Award for his distinguished contributions to commercial aviation.

In 1980, he was inducted into the U.S. National Aviation Hall of Fame at the National Museum of the United States Air Force, Wright-Patterson Air Force Base in Dayton, Ohio.

Six was a key player in the revealed mystery of the third episode of Starlee Kine's Gimlet Media-produced podcast "Mystery Show".

In 2011, United Airlines, which merged with Continental Airlines, named a plane (N77006) after Robert Six.

== Sources ==
- Buckley, William F. Jr. (September 17, 1980). "Frank Lorenzo & the free market". National Review. Vol. 42, no. 18. Archived from the original on June 23, 2005.
- Delaney, Kevin J. (1999). Strategic Bankruptcy: How Corporations and Creditors Use Chapter 11 to Their Advantage. University of California Press. ISBN 0-520-07359-2.
- Customer Service Manual (1970 ed.). Continental Airlines.

Preceded by (none)	CEO of Continental Airlines; 1936 – 1980	Succeeded by Alvin Feldman
