= People Express Airlines (1980s) =

Low-cost airline in the United States (1981–1987)

PEOPLExpress
IATA	ICAO	Call sign
PE	PEX	PEOPLE
- Founded: April 30, 1981
- Ceased operations: February 1, 1987 (merged into Continental Airlines)
- Hubs: Denver–Stapleton; Newark
- Focus cities: Baltimore
- Subsidiaries: Britt Airways (1986–1987); Frontier Airlines (1985–1986); Provincetown-Boston Airlines (1986–1987)
- Parent company: Texas Air Corporation (1986–1987)
- Headquarters: Newark, New Jersey, U.S.
- Key people: Beverly Lynn Burns (First female Boeing 747 airline captain)
- Founder: Don Burr (First CEO)

People Express Airlines, stylized as PEOPLExpress, was a low-cost airline in the United States that operated from 1981 until it merged with Continental Airlines in 1987. Its headquarters was in the North Terminal (later Terminal C) of Newark Liberty International Airport (EWR) in Newark, New Jersey.

== History ==
=== Founding and rapid expansion ===
The company was founded by Don Burr, and several others, who resigned from Frank Lorenzo's Texas International in order to do so. Burr was influenced by British airline entrepreneur Freddie Laker, whose forays into low-cost air travel attracted much press in the 1970s. Terminal space was leased at Newark Airport's North Terminal.

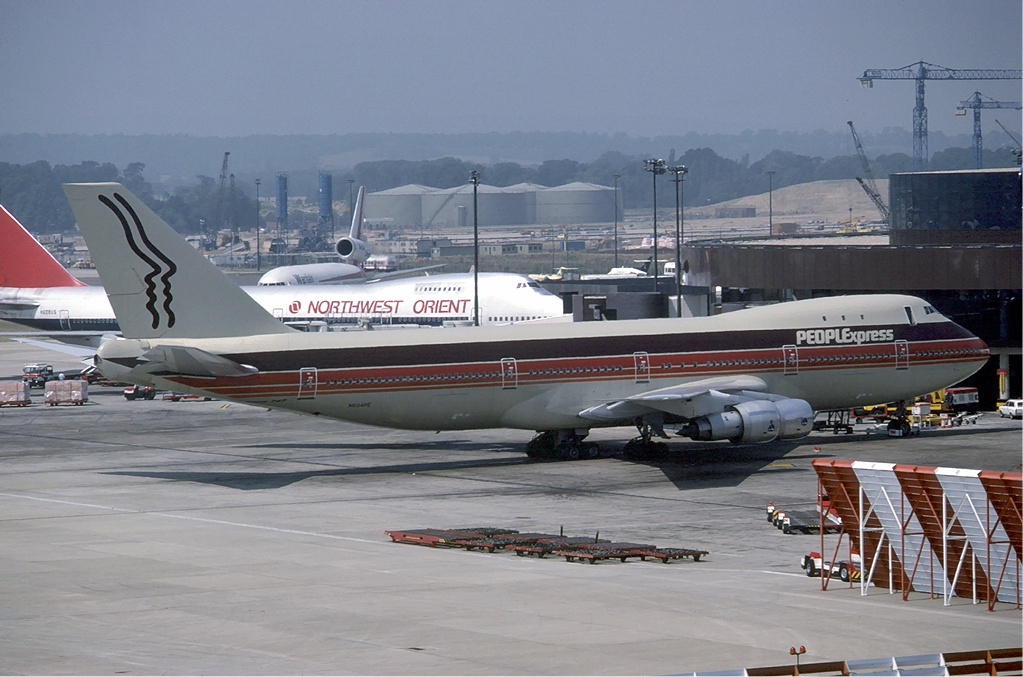
People Express Boeing 747 at London Gatwick Airport

People Express was launched on April 30, 1981, with Boeing 737 flights from Newark to Buffalo, Columbus and Norfolk; Jacksonville and Cleveland Hopkins were added a month later. In December PE had 42 weekday departures from EWR to Baltimore/Washington, Boston Logan, Burlington, Buffalo Niagara, Port Columbus, Jacksonville, Norfolk, Sarasota-Bradenton, Syracuse Hancock and Palm Beach plus some flights around the periphery of the hub-and-spokes.

On May 26, 1983, People Express began non-stop flights from Newark to London's Gatwick Airport with a leased Boeing 747-227B previously operated by Braniff International Airways. Flights started at $149 each way. The route was an instant success with all flights sold out.

Revenue Passenger-Kilometers, in millions
Year	Traffic
1981	650
1982	2502
1983	5902
1984	12391
1985	17638

The airline used a simplified fare structure. All seats on a route were offered at the same price except for slightly lower "off-peak" fares. All seats were in economy class except for "Premium Class" on Boeing 747 flights which featured two class service. Fares were paid in cash aboard the aircraft early in the flight. Passengers were permitted to bring one carry-on bag for free and each checked bag cost $3.00. People Express was the first United States airline to charge a fee for each checked bag. People Express also charged modest amounts for customers wanting food or beverages. Sodas cost 50¢ per can, beer cost $1 per can, honey-roasted peanuts and Rachel's brownies were also 50¢, and the People Express "snak-pak" (an assortment of cheeses, crackers, and salami) cost $2.

By 1986, People Express was offering first class in addition to coach seating on all of its Boeing 747 aircraft. A full color print ad at the time stated: "AHHH....THE THINGS SOME PEOPLE HAVE TO DO TO SAVE MONEY. Introducing People Express First Class. Spacious leather seats, two abreast. Service beyond compare. Fine china, crystal and linen. Fresh flowers....A price lower than most standard coach fares on other airlines." This first class service was available on transatlantic flights between Newark and Europe, on transcontinental flights between Newark and California, and on 747 flights between Newark and Denver.

=== Acquisitions of other airlines ===
In 1985 People Express bought out Denver-based Frontier Airlines. The cover of the May 1, 1986, People Express timetable had the following message: "We're Flying The Widest Plane To The Highest Place: Introducing The Only 747 Service From New York To Denver. PEOPLExpress & Frontier" This 747 service linked the People Express hub at Newark Airport with the Frontier hub in Denver. The combined company operated flights to most major U.S. cities as well as international service to Brussels and London. People Express also bought two commuter air carriers, Britt Airways in the U.S. Midwest and Provincetown-Boston Airlines (PBA) which served New England and Florida.

By June 1985, People Express had lost $5.8 million on operating income of $18.7 million.

On August 2, 1985, the company announced it was launching daily Boeing 747 service between Brussels and Newark at the prices of $149; to promote the new route, fares were discounted to $99 until September 30. By that time, the airline flew to 41 cities worldwide, with 4,000 employees and a fleet of 72 airplanes.

The purchasing spree placed an enormous debt burden on the carrier at the same time that the major legacy carriers' improved their yield management schemes, enabling them to better compete with People Express fares. Integrating Frontier's operations caused labor struggles within the newly absorbed airline, and the change to a low-fare, no-frills mentality alienated Frontier's passengers.

Debt pressure on the carrier forced a change in philosophy, as People Express sought to lure business travelers who would pay higher fares. Aircraft cabins were redesigned to include a first-class section, a frequent flyer plan was initiated, and the simplified fare structure was abandoned in favor of the now-usual "revenue management" pricing.

=== Merger with Continental Airlines ===
The failed integration and enormous debt stretched People Express too far, and in June 1986, the company announced that it was working with an investment bank to seek buyers for part, or all, of the airline. A deal to sell Frontier off to United Airlines fell through due to the inability of United to agree to terms with their unions on how to incorporate Frontier's staff, leading People Express management to cease Frontier's operations and file for bankruptcy protection for the subsidiary.

In the end, People Express was forced to sell entirely to Texas Air Corporation for roughly $125 million in cash, notes, and assumed debt. Due to concerns about regulatory approval for the purchase, Texas Air first purchased the assets of Frontier from People Express in a separate transaction worth $176 million and then merged Frontier into Continental Airlines, another Texas Air subsidiary. People Express ceased to exist as a carrier on February 1, 1987, when its operations were subsequently merged as well into Continental Airlines via a joint marketing agreement. Continental maintained the Newark hub built by People Express, which passed to United Airlines after United and Continental merged in 2010.

People Express's spartan, no-frills service earned the carrier several derisive nicknames, including "People Distress" and "Air Bulgaria" (a sarcastic reference to the poor customer service associated with Eastern Bloc countries during the Cold War).

== Destinations in 1986 ==
According to its September 15, 1986 route map, People Express was serving the following cities. Cities in bold were served with Boeing 747s.

- Albany, NY (ALB)
- Allentown, PA (ABE)
- Atlanta, GA (ATL)
- Baltimore, MD (BWI)
- Birmingham, AL (BHM)
- Boston, MA (BOS)
- **Brussels, Belgium** (BRU)
- Buffalo, NY (BUF)
- Burlington, VT (BTV)
- Charlotte, NC (CLT)
- Chicago, IL (ORD)
- Cincinnati, OH (CVG)
- Cleveland, OH (CLE)
- Columbus, OH (CMH)
- Dallas/Fort Worth, TX (DFW)
- Dayton, OH (DAY)
- **Denver, CO** (DEN)
- Detroit, MI (DTW)
- Fort Lauderdale, FL (FLL)
- Fort Myers, FL (RSW)
- Hartford, CT/Springfield, MA (BDL)
- Houston, TX – Hobby Airport (HOU)
- Jacksonville, FL (JAX)
- **London, UK** – Gatwick Airport (LGW)
- **Los Angeles, CA** (LAX)
- Montreal, QC (YMX)
- Miami, FL (MIA)
- Nashville, TN (BNA)
- **Newark, NJ** – Newark Airport (EWR) – Hub and airline headquarters
- New Orleans, LA (MSY)
- Norfolk, VA (ORF)
- **Oakland, CA** – Oakland International Airport (OAK) – San Francisco, CA was initially served via Oakland with the airline subsequently moving its 747 service from Oakland to San Francisco International Airport (SFO)
- Orlando, FL (MCO)
- Philadelphia, PA (PHL)
- Pittsburgh, PA (PIT)
- Portland, ME (PWM)
- Providence, RI (PVD)
- Raleigh/Durham, NC (RDU)
- Rochester, NY (ROC)
- St. Louis, MO (STL)
- St. Petersburg, FL – St. Petersburg/Clearwater International Airport (PIE) – Tampa, FL was served via St. Petersburg
- Sarasota, FL (SRQ)
- Syracuse, NY (SYR)
- Washington, DC – Dulles International Airport (IAD)
- Washington, DC – National Airport (DCA, now Reagan Airport)
- West Palm Beach, FL (PBI)

The route map includes service operated by commuter air carriers Provincetown-Boston Airlines (PBA) in Florida and the U.S. northeast, and Britt Airways in the U.S. midwest. PBA had a hub at St. Petersburg (PIE) in Florida and also served Hyannis, Martha's Vineyard, Nantucket and New Bedford in the U.S. northeast. Britt had hubs at Chicago (ORD) and St. Louis.

== Fleet ==
People Express operated the following jet aircraft types at the time of its merger with Continental Airlines:

People Express Fleet
Aircraft	Total	Passengers (Economy)	Notes
Boeing 727-200	50	185	Braniff, Delta & Alitalia
Boeing 737-100	17	118	Bought from Lufthansa
Boeing 737-200	5	130
Boeing 747-100	3	435	Bought from Alitalia
Boeing 747-200B	6	435

== In popular culture ==
On the episode of animated sitcom The Simpsons, Homer Simpson describes 1985 as the year "People Express introduced a generation of hicks to air travel" in the 1985-set flashback episode "Homer's Barbershop Quartet"

== Headquarters ==
The PeopleExpress headquarters were on the grounds of Newark International Airport. The headquarters offices, described by the Miami Herald as "a maze-like bevy of small offices," were in an attic, located on the second floor of the North Terminal. The North Terminal first opened in 1953. Before the arrival of PeopleExpress, the terminal was largely unused, although it had some charter flights departing and arriving there. After the end of PeopleExpress, the Department of Veterans Affairs used the former terminal as a transfer point for casualties in the Gulf War. In 1997, a project to demolish the North Terminal and redevelop the land was launched at a cost of $50.1 million.

== Reuse of name ==
On February 13, 2012, Newport News/Williamsburg International Airport announced the resurrection of the People Express brand for a start-up airline. Corporate headquarters for the airline were located in Newport News. Service was initially anticipated to begin from Pittsburgh in late 2013. However this was delayed until 2014 due to the lengthy certification process. On October 5, Jeffrey Erickson, former Atlas Air President and CEO was announced as People Express CEO.

Having eventually started service on June 30, 2014, People Express abruptly suspended service on September 26, 2014, due to its two planes being grounded for maintenance and repairs. Service never resumed.

On November 12, 2014, this new version of People Express was evicted from the Newport News/Williamsburg International Airport due to non-payment of Passenger Facilities Charges of US$100,000.

== See also ==
- List of defunct airlines of the United States
