= New York Air =

Low-cost airline of the United States (1980–1987)

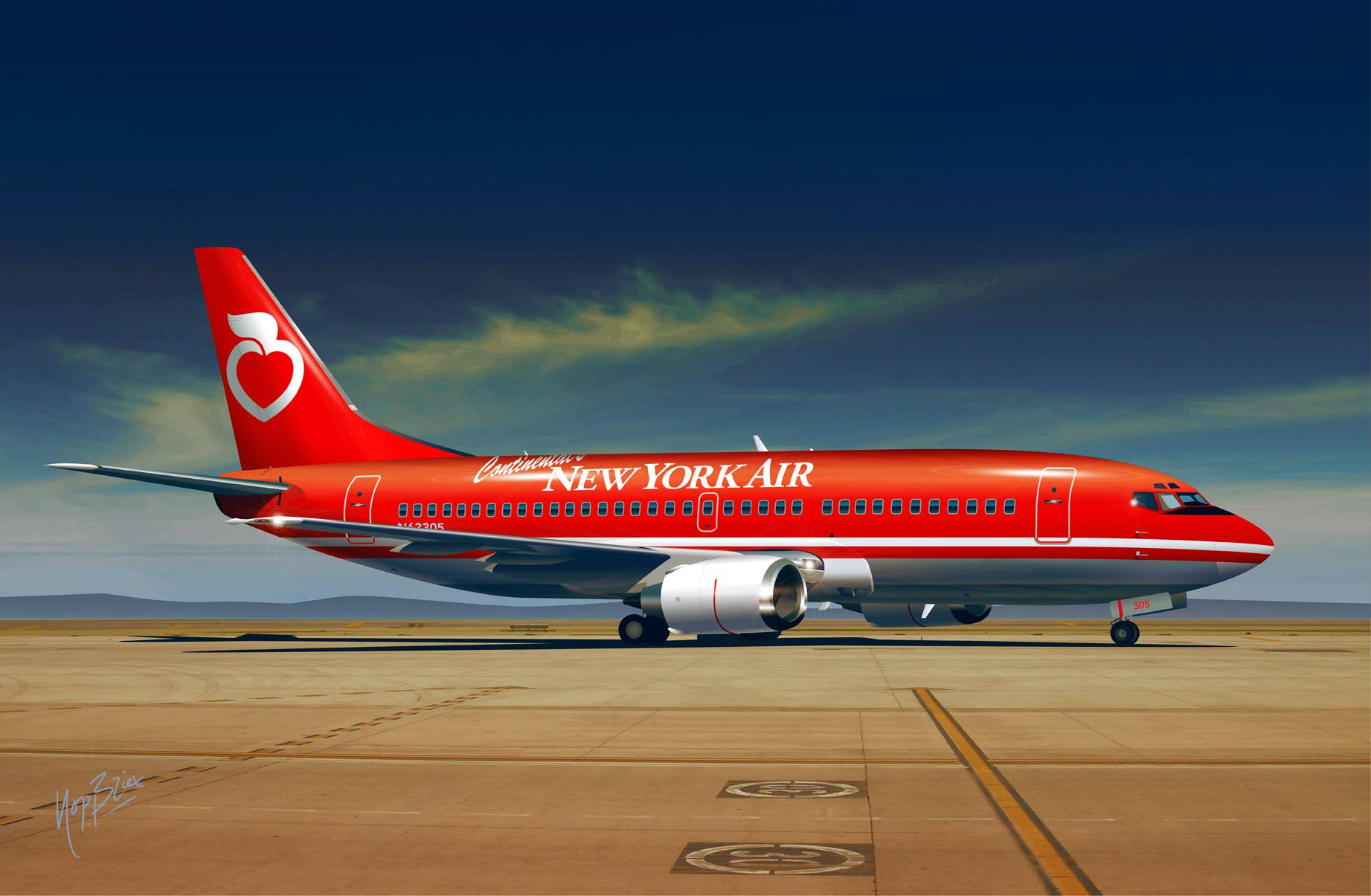
| IATA | ICAO | Call sign |
|---|---|---|
| NY | NYA | APPLE |
- Founded: September 1980
- Ceased operations: February 1, 1987 (merged into Continental Airlines)
- Hubs: New York–LaGuardia; 1980–1987); Raleigh/Durham (1983–1985); Washington–Dulles (1985–1987)
- Parent company: Texas Air Corporation (1980–1987)
- Headquarters: LaGuardia Airport, New York
- Key people: Frank Lorenzo; Neal F. Meehan (1980–1982); Michael E. Levine (1982–1984); Douglas C. Birdsall (1985–1987)

New York Air was a low-cost airline in the United States owned by Texas Air Corporation and based at Hangar 5 at LaGuardia Airport in Flushing, Queens, New York. It ceased operations on February 1, 1987, in a merger with Continental Airlines.

New York Air was well known for its onboard bagged snacks, known as "The Flying Nosh".

== History ==
=== Foundation ===
In September 1980, Frank Lorenzo's Texas Air Corporation announced plans to launch a low-fare airline in the Northeast US, which would then become known as New York Air. The carrier would be the second airline to launch following the deregulation of the US airline industry, which allowed Texas Air to freely expand its operations without government intervention. New York Air would initially compete with Eastern Airlines and its Eastern Air Shuttle service, which offered hourly service between New York's LaGuardia Airport, Boston's Logan Airport, and Washington DC's National Airport, by operating a similar hourly service between the three cities, but offering lower fares than Eastern, and also offering advanced reservations and complimentary drinks and snacks, which Eastern didn't offer. The airline then planned to expand and offer service to other cities along the East Coast. Plans were also announced for a large operation in White Plains, however that never commenced.

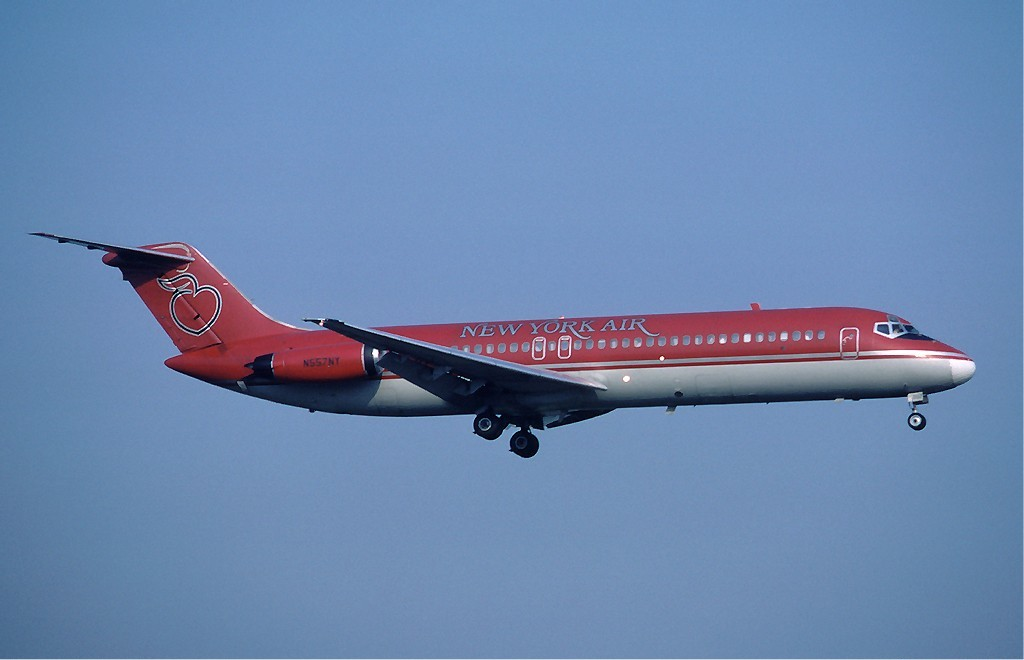
DC-9-32 of New York Air

Founding New York Air president, Neal F. Meehan, had been a senior manager at both Continental Airlines and at Texas International Airlines (TI). In September, 1980, he assembled a team of airline managers; within 90 days it had hired, trained, uniformed, and drilled New York Air's flight crew, flight attendants, dispatchers, terminal, ramp and reservations personnel. Office and maintenance facilities in the hangar which had originally housed American Airlines headquarters at LaGuardia in the 1930s were thrown up rapidly, and the carrier obtained FAA certification as an adjunct to TI's certificate. In one notable vignette, New York Air managers interviewed over a thousand candidates for flight attendant, reservations, and airport jobs in one day of group interviews held at New York's famed Town Hall Theater, in November 1980.

New York Air commenced operations on December 19, 1980, with a flight from New York LaGuardia to Washington National, however only 5 of the 125 seats on the aircraft were filled. By April 1981, New York Air had an average 62% load factor, close to its break-even load factor of 65%, and had generated a $1.5 million loss. Executives described this as a 'moderate success', however subsequently raised fares on its LaGuardia flights.

=== Initial struggles ===
Following its launch, New York Air quickly expanded and established a hub operation in LaGuardia, with new service to Cleveland beginning in April 1981, as well as smaller focus cities in Boston and Washington National. However several planned destinations, such as Dayton, Pittsburgh, and service to several destinations in Upstate New York, were scrapped. A LaGuardia-Detroit service was operated for a short period, before being shifted to Newark, where the airline began a secondary smaller hub operation. By July, services from LaGuardia to Cincinnati and Louisville had also begun. By December, the airline had a fleet of 13 DC-9-30 aircraft.

The 1981 Air Traffic Controllers strike badly affected New York Air's operations and its finances. The strike led to long flight delays, encouraging passengers to avoid flying. In order to ease delays, the Federal Aviation Administration reduced the number of available slots in Northeastern airports, forcing airlines to cut flights. Larger airlines were able to counter this by using larger aircraft, such as Eastern's decision to operate 260-seat Airbus A300s on its shuttle flights. This meant that Eastern could still carry the same number of passengers per day despite the slot reductions, reducing the damage to its income. Due to New York Air's small fleet, it was unable to follow a similar tactic, and its shuttle service was heavily damaged by the slot restrictions. This, as well as Eastern's larger aircraft flooding the market, led to New York Air ending its Boston service after less than a year in operation.

To maintain a presence in Boston, the airline established a hub at Logan Airport, offering service to Baltimore and Orlando. However, these services proved to be unprofitable, and the Boston hub was closed by the end of 1982. Services to Cleveland, Cincinnati and Louisville had also been cut due to competition from larger airlines such as Eastern and United. To keep the airline afloat, Texas Air provided a $10 million cash injection, and banks provided $15 million in revolving credit. Another $15 million was obtained through the sale of 1.8 million shares. To keep the company going through winter 1981, the airline sought another $10–15 million from its banks.

==== Union disputes ====
New York Air was established as a non-union company, angering the Airline Pilots Association (ALPA), as well as staff at Texas International Airlines, also a Texas Air subsidiary, who branded New York Air as a 'runaway shop'. A week after New York Air commenced operations, a number of Texas International employees began picketing outside LaGuardia Airport, claiming that the airline was an attempt by Texas Air to get around Texas International's union contracts, and that the company was seeking to remove unionized staff by shifting operations to the non-union New York Air. Meehan denied this, stating that New York Air was "completely separate from Texas International" and would be prepared to negotiate contracts if its staff chose to unionize.

ALPA soon began a full-scale campaign with the intention of preventing New York Air from growing as a non-union airline. In July 1981, ALPA set up what it called a 'political campaign-style operation', with a call centre and volunteers mailing informational material, against the airline. Leaflets and brochures were created, describing New York Air as 'Texas Air's Bad Apple' (a play on New York's 'Big Apple' nickname, and referencing the apple icon in New York Air's logo), and containing damning statistics about the airline, such as its poor on-time record and reputation for overbooked flights. Badges with printed 'Please Don't Fly New York Air' titles on them were also produced. The materials used an edited version of the New York Air logo with a rotten apple. In August 1981, ALPA began picketing in Boston and Washington DC.

In what ALPA described as a 'desperate attempt' to gain business, the airline began offering limited-time 29 cent fares, which could only be purchased in-person. The 29-cent fares were actually a one-day promotion to attract media attention when New York Air inaugurated service between New York and Boston in February 1981. These promotional fares created large crowds of people seeking to purchase New York Air tickets. Images of these crowds were broadcast by local media, who then repeated ALPA's claims and brought attention to its campaign against the airline. ALPA picketers also handed out anti-New York Air leaflets and material to those waiting to purchase promotional fares.

Months after the campaign commenced, Lorenzo agreed to a new contract for Texas International pilots, however didn't offer a contract to New York Air pilots. ALPA planned to begin picketing at Newark Airport, however then began winding down the campaign in order to focus on supporting the 1981 Air Traffic Controllers strike.

=== Restructuring and expansion ===
In 1982, it became clear that the airline was in trouble. By the end of 1981, New York Air had lost $11 million, with an additional $8.2 million lost in the first quarter of 1982. In July 1982, Meehan resigned as president, and was subsequently replaced by Michael E. Levine, who was appointed as chairman in February. Under Levine's leadership, New York Air repositioned itself as a full-service airline and began targeting business passengers with premium service but still at fares which were typically lower than on competing carriers.

Levine first shrunk New York Air's network, and introduced new services to underserved destinations with more business demand. In August 1982, shuttle service between LaGuardia and Boston resumed, and schedules between LaGuardia and Washington National were changed so flights would leave LaGuardia on the hour, rather than on the half-hour. The airline also began offering complementary bagels on morning flights, as well as wine and newspapers, allowing the shuttle to compete more effectively with Eastern. Similar shuttle services were also added from Newark, initially only to Washington National.

In 1983, the airline began a small hub operation at Raleigh-Durham Airport, with connections to Greenville, Knoxville, Savannah, and later Orlando, as well as feeder service on Air Virginia and Sunbird Airlines. The carrier targeted the hub at passengers who would usually connect through larger Southeastern hubs such as Atlanta or Charlotte. A private boarding lounge known as the 'Apple Club' was offered to passengers connecting through Raleigh, reinforcing New York Air's new premium model. By September 1984, service to Boston, Greenville, Knoxville and Orlando from Raleigh had ceased, with remaining service from Raleigh ceasing by 1985. Raleigh briefly returned to New York Air's network as a connection from Washington Dulles in September 1986.

By the end of 1983, the airline was profitable for the first time, and began ordering larger McDonnell Douglas MD-80 aircraft to supplement its DC-9 fleet.

In October 1984, Texas Air ordered 24 Boeing 737-300 aircraft, 8 of which would be delivered to New York Air beginning in 1985. This marked the first time New York Air operated Boeing aircraft, as well as any aircraft not produced by McDonnell Douglas.

In July 1985, New York Air announced it would open a hub at Washington Dulles Airport. Construction began on a $3.6 million concourse to handle the expanded number of flights, which featured an 'Apple Club' restaurant. By the end of 1985, New York Air had 35 flights a day from Dulles, and eventually made the airport its main operational focus. The airline also continued expanding its Boston and LaGuardia operations with seasonal service to Martha's Vineyard and Nantucket.

=== Merger with Continental ===
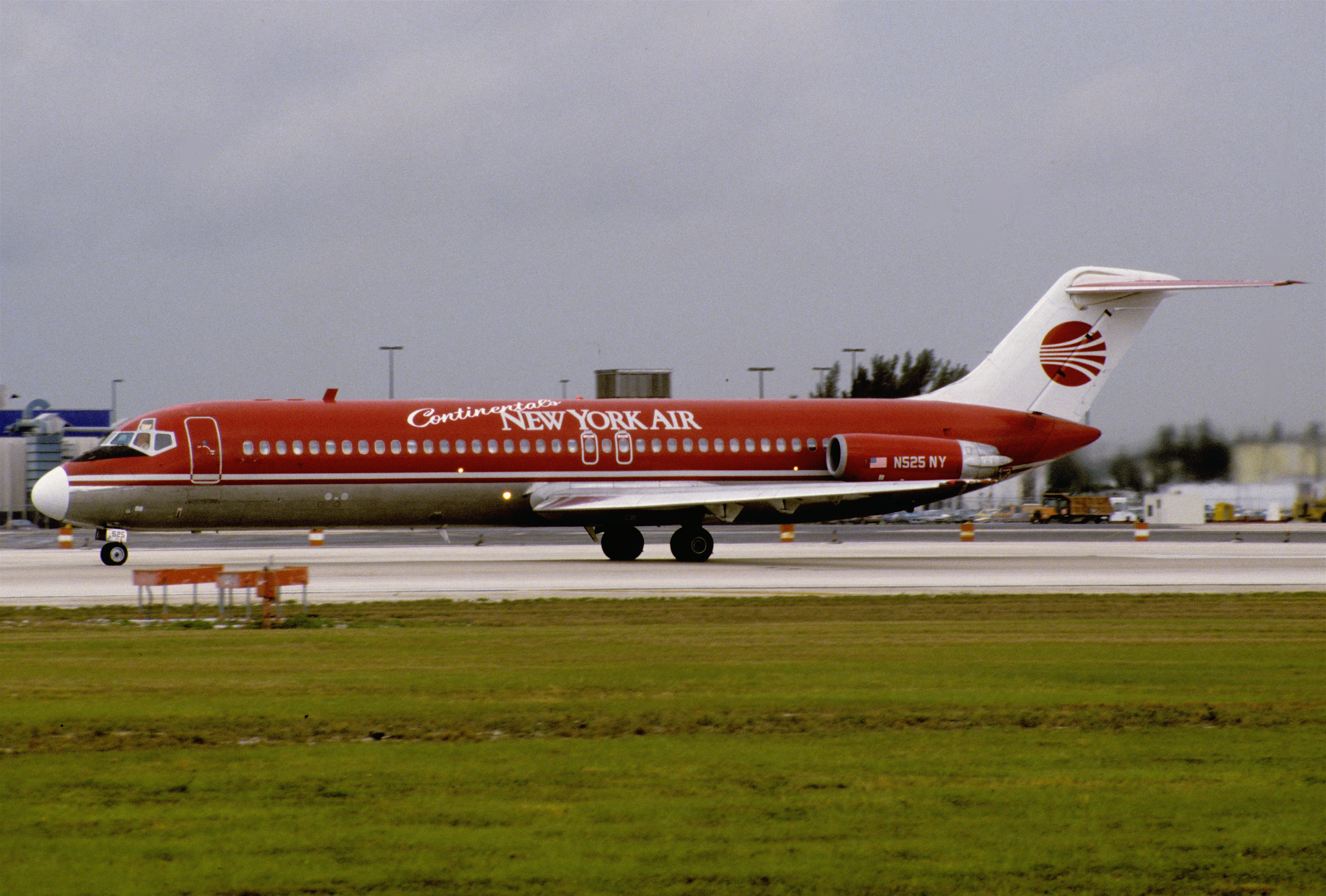
New York Air DC-9 with 'Continental's New York Air' titles

Beginning in 1986, Texas Air started co-ordinating the operations of all of its subsidiaries. New York Air began code-sharing with other Texas Air subsidiaries, such as on Continental Airlines' services into Dulles. This then led to a co-operation between Continental and New York Air, branded as the 'New York Air/Continental Team'.

Also in 1988, Texas Air sold New York Air's shuttle service to Pan Am, in order to gain government approval for its planned takeover of Eastern Airlines. NYA then shifted its LGA to BOS and DCA flights to Newark. This led to the closure of New York Air's LaGuardia hub, which it had operated since the airline's 1980 launch.

In January 1987, Texas Air announced its intention to merge New York Air, along with fellow subsidiaries Frontier Airlines and People Express Airlines, into Continental. According to Lorenzo, the merger was necessary in order to ensure both Continental and Texas Air had 'the strength and size to compete in tomorrow's air travel market', and also made Continental the third largest airline in the US. New York Air's operations ceased on February 1, 1987 and its aircraft were subsequently repainted with 'Continental's New York Air' titles, before gradually being repainted into the full Continental livery.

New York Air's Newark to Boston and Washington National shuttle was retained by Continental and operated with former NYA 737-300s and DC9s as a stand-alone operation for local passengers not connecting with other Continental flights, ironically from the former People Express North Terminal. Continental also operated the former People Express 727-200s between Newark, Boston and Washington from Terminal B as "system flights" which permitted connections to other former PE flights, now branded as CO at Terminal B. The Washington Dulles hub was initially retained and subsequently expanded through the acquisition of gates from Presidential Airways, as well as taking over Dulles routes from Eastern, however by 1989, Continental had closed the Dulles hub. Once Newark's Terminal C opened, the former NYC shuttle flights ceased operation from the North Terminal and were folded into the operations at Terminal C.

== Cities served ==
- Baltimore (Baltimore/Washington International Thurgood Marshall Airport)
- Boston (Logan International Airport)
- Charleston (Charleston International Airport)
- Cincinnati (Cincinnati/Northern Kentucky International Airport)
- Cleveland (Cleveland Hopkins International Airport)
- Detroit (Detroit Metropolitan Wayne County Airport)
- Fort Lauderdale/Hollywood (Fort Lauderdale – Hollywood International Airport)
- Greenville/Spartanburg (Greenville-Spartanburg International Airport)
- Hartford (Bradley International Airport)
- Islip (Long Island MacArthur Airport)
- Jacksonville (Jacksonville International Airport)
- Knoxville (McGhee Tyson Airport)
- Martha's Vineyard (Martha's Vineyard Airport)
- Nantucket (Nantucket Memorial Airport)
- New Orleans (Louis Armstrong New Orleans International Airport)
- New York City (JFK Airport)
- New York City (LaGuardia Airport)
- Newark (Newark Liberty International Airport)
- Orlando (Orlando International Airport)
- Raleigh/Durham (Raleigh-Durham International Airport)
- Rochester (Greater Rochester International Airport)
- Savannah (Savannah/Hilton Head International Airport)
- St Pete-Clearwater (St Pete-Clearwater International Airport)
- Washington, D.C. (Ronald Reagan Washington National Airport)
- Washington, D.C. (Washington Dulles International Airport)
- West Palm Beach (Palm Beach International Airport)
- White Plains (Westchester County Airport)

== Fleet ==
New York Air operated 40 aircraft painted in a red color scheme with a stylized "apple" logo on the aircraft tail, evoking New York's nickname "The Big Apple." The airline operated mostly DC-9 and MD-80 aircraft but it did utilize a small number of Boeing 737-300 aircraft.

- 20 – McDonnell Douglas DC-9-30
- 12 – McDonnell Douglas MD-82
- 8 – Boeing 737-300

== See also ==
- List of defunct airlines of the United States
