= Texas Air Corporation =

Airline holding company of the United States (1980–1990)

- Founded: June 1980
- Defunct: December 1990
- Headquarters: American General Center, Houston, Texas, U.S.
- Key people: Frank Lorenzo

Texas Air Corporation, also known as Texas Air, was an airline holding company in the United States, incorporated in June 1980 by airline investor Frank Lorenzo to hold and invest in airlines. The company had its headquarters in the America Tower in the American General Center in Houston, Texas.

== History ==
The company initially acted as a holding company for Texas International Airlines, which Lorenzo owned through his investment firm Jet Capital. It was the first airline to form a holding company; almost all airlines followed. Shortly after its formation, Texas Air founded New York Air, a low-cost carrier in the US Northeast. In 1981, Texas Air acquired Continental Airlines through a hostile takeover bid, the first time an airline sought to acquire another through a stock tender offer. Subsequently, Texas Air merged Continental with Texas International, retaining the Continental brand. In 1986, Texas Air acquired both Eastern Air Lines and People Express Airlines, including the assets of People Express's bankrupt subsidiary, Frontier Airlines. In 1987, Texas Air consolidated its airline holdings by merging Frontier, New York Air and People Express into Continental, in turn making the latter the third-largest airline in the US, and leaving Texas Air with two mainline carriers: Continental and Eastern, as well a number of commuter airlines.

Texas Air was famous for its tough stance against organised labor groups, and usage of union-busting tactics to lower labor costs within its subsidiaries. In September 1983, Continental filed for Chapter 11 bankruptcy, stating that its high labor costs prevented it from effectively competing with non-union startup carriers and the new two-tier wage scales by its major competitor American Airlines. The bankruptcy filing allowed Continental to fire 8,000 employees, and subsequently rehire a small portion of them at lower wage rates and improved work rules. With lower labor costs, Texas Air successfully restructured Continental as a low-fare carrier, and allowed it to exit bankruptcy in 1986. In the same year, the company began a four-year battle with the International Association of Machinists in an attempt to lower labor costs at Eastern. In March 1989, Texas Air locked out Eastern's mechanics, which resulted in the majority of Eastern employees walking out on strike, forcing the airline into bankruptcy. In April 1990, Eastern's bankruptcy judge ordered the removal of Texas Air's control of the carrier.

At its peak in 1986, Texas Air was the second-largest airline in the world, behind the USSR's state carrier Aeroflot, and the largest airline in the United States, with control of 20% of the US domestic air travel market, a fleet of 600 aircraft, and an $8.5 billion valuation. However, by 1989, the company had $5.4 billion worth of debt, and lost a total of $2 billion in just two years, breaking the record in both 1988 and 1989 for the largest losses ever reported by a US airline. Following the loss of Eastern, in June 1990 Texas Air rebranded itself as "Continental Airlines Holdings", in order to "reflect the fact that the principal business of the company is Continental", according to Lorenzo. In August of the same year, Lorenzo agreed to leave the company after selling his remaining shares to SAS. However, the company was never able to recover from its significant debts and poor reputation, and entered bankruptcy in December. In November 1992, Continental and Britt Airways (a commuter airline owned by Texas Air) were bought by an Air Canada-led consortium, resulting in Continental Airlines Holdings being dissolved.

== Holdings ==
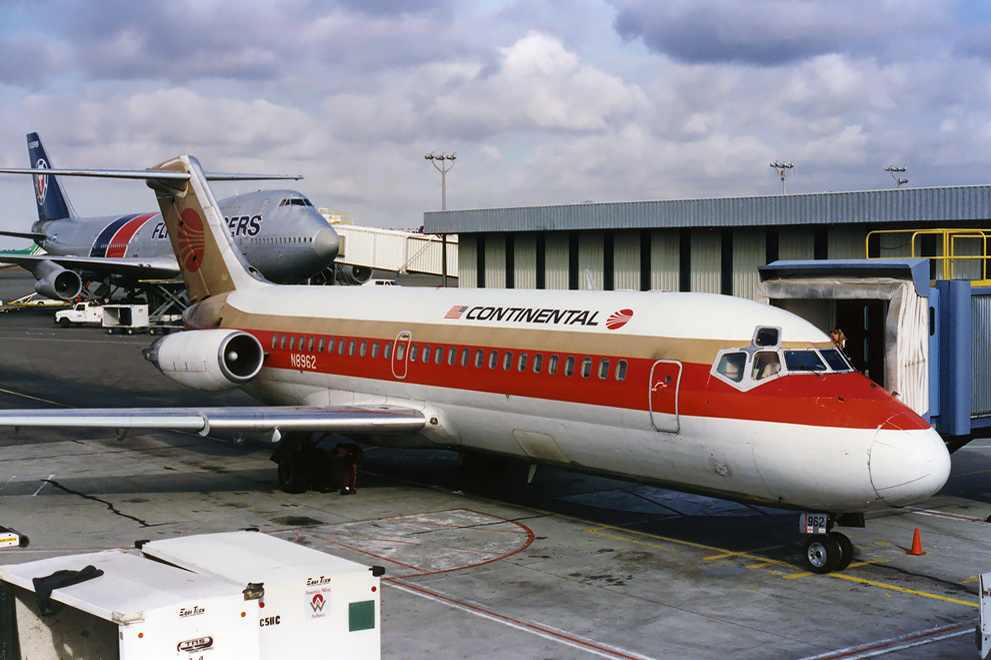
A Continental Airlines DC-9-10. This aircraft was formerly operated by Texas International Airlines before it was merged with Continental in 1982

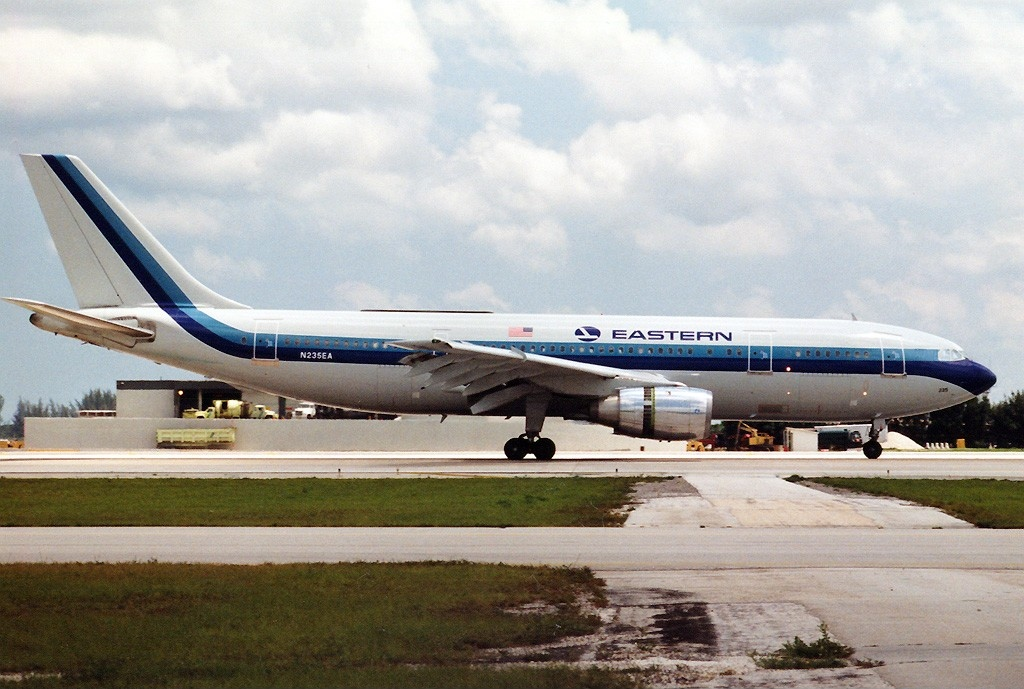
An Eastern Airlines Airbus A300. Texas Air transferred this aircraft to Continental shortly after it acquired Eastern

Airline holdings
Company	Acquired	Defunct	Fate	Notes
Bar Harbor Airlines	1986	1987	Merged with Britt Airways	
Britt Airways	1986		Sold, rebranded as ExpressJet	Former subsidiary of People Express
Continental Airlines	1981		Sold, merged with United Airlines in 2012	
Continental Micronesia	1981		Sold, merged with United Airlines in 2012	Operated as a subsidiary of Continental
Eastern Air Lines	1986	1991	Declared bankruptcy and liquidated	
Frontier Airlines	1985	1986	Merged with Continental Airlines	Former subsidiary of People Express
New York Air	1980	1987	Merged with Continental Airlines	
People Express Airlines	1986	1987	Merged with Continental Airlines	
Provincetown-Boston Airlines	1986	1987	Merged with Britt Airways	Former subsidiary of People Express
Rocky Mountain Airways	1985	1987	Merged with Britt Airways	
Texas International Airlines	1980	1982	Merged with Continental Airlines	Predecessor to Texas Air Corporation
Non-airline holdings
CCS Automation Systems	1983	1989	Merged with System One	Airline reservation system
System One	1987	1990	Sold	Airline reservation system Former subsidiary of Eastern Airlines
Texas Air Leasing Corporation	1984	1990	Liquidated	Aircraft leasing firm

Alongside its official holdings, the company also operated through a number of shell companies in order to protect Texas Air's core assets from bankruptcy proceedings, such as Texas Air Fuel Services, which controlled all fuel transactions for the company's airline subsidiaries.

== See also ==
- CASI
