= Texas International Airlines =

Airline of the United States (1944–1982)

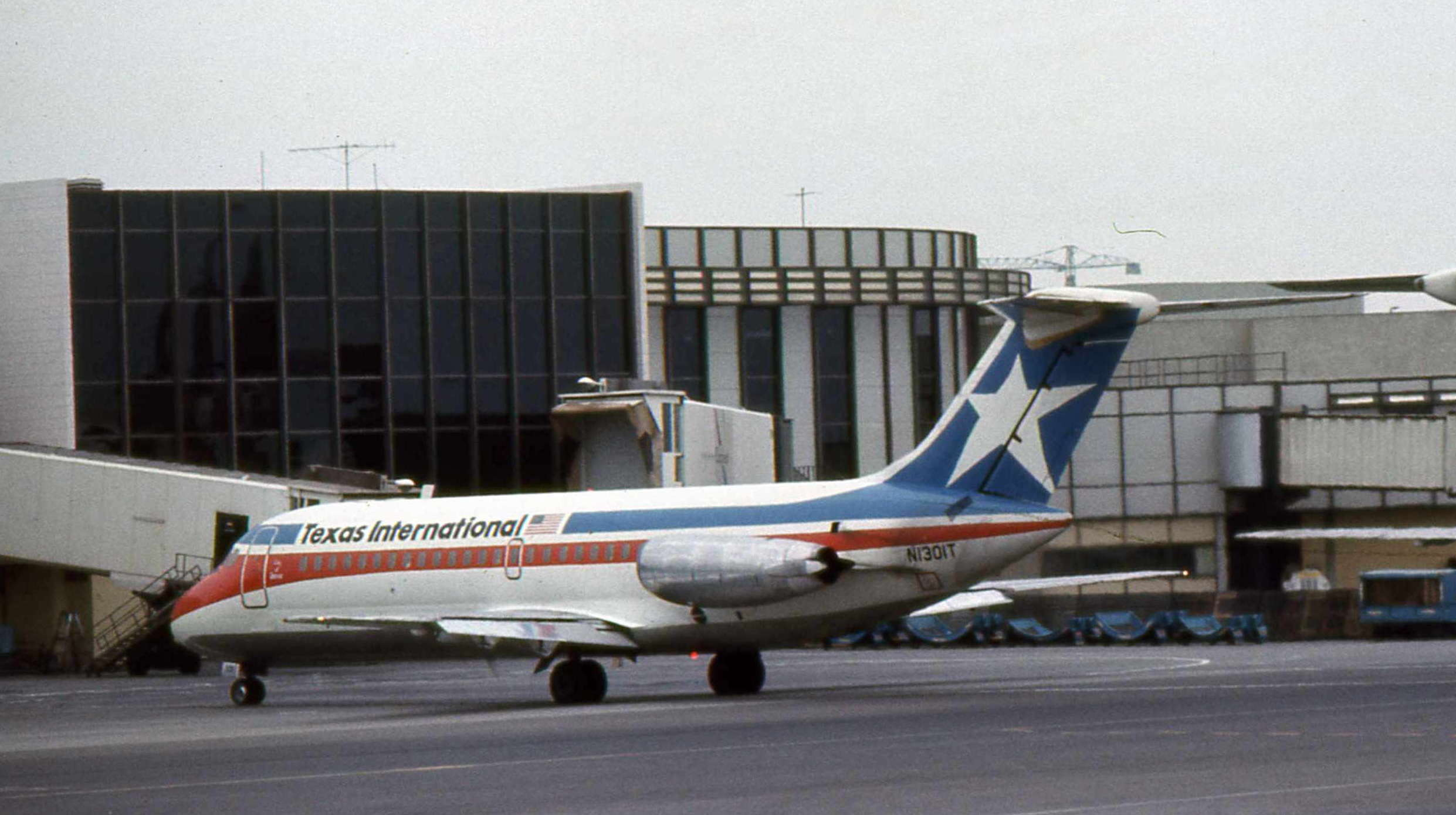
IATA	ICAO	Call sign
TI	TIA	TEXAS INTERNATIONAL
- Founded: 1944 (as Aviation Enterprises)
- Ceased operations: October 31, 1982 (merged into Continental Airlines)
- Hubs: Austin–Mueller; Dallas/Fort Worth (1973–1982); Dallas–Love; Houston–Hobby; Houston–Intercontinental (1969–1982)
- Frequent-flyer program: Payola Pass
- Parent company: Texas Air Corporation (1980–1982)
- Headquarters: Houston, Texas, U.S.
- Key people: Frank Lorenzo

Texas International Airlines Inc. was a local service carrier, a scheduled airline in the United States, known from 1940 until 1947 as Aviation Enterprises, until 1969 as Trans-Texas Airways (TTA), and as Texas International Airlines until 1982, when it merged with Continental Airlines. It was headquartered near William P. Hobby Airport in Houston, Texas.

Trans-Texas Airways originally operated in Texas and surrounding states. In August 1953, it scheduled flights to 36 airports from El Paso to Memphis; in May 1968, TTA flew to 48 U.S. airports plus Monterrey, Tampico and Veracruz in Mexico. The airline changed its name to Texas International and continued to grow.

When Texas International was merged into Continental Airlines in 1982, it had grown to reach Baltimore, Colorado Springs, Denver, Fort Lauderdale, Hartford, Kansas City, Los Angeles, Ontario CA., Mexico City, Milwaukee, Minneapolis/St. Paul, Omaha, Phoenix, St. Louis, Salt Lake City, Tucson, and Washington, DC, and had an all-DC-9 jet fleet. In 2010, Continental merged into United Airlines.

== History ==
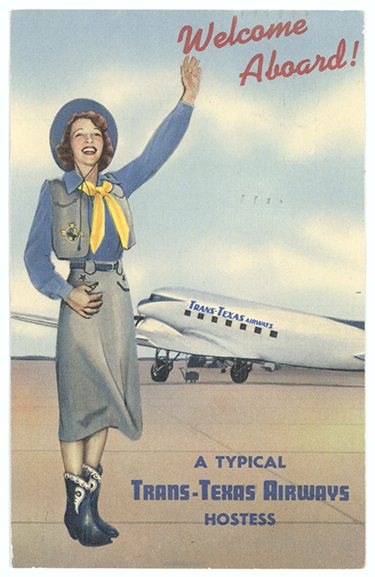
Promotional postcard for Trans-Texas Airways

Revenue passenger traffic, in millions of passenger-miles (scheduled flights only, domestic plus international)

Year	Pax-Miles
1951	17
1955	35
1960	70
1965	209
1970	659
1975	580

In 1949, all Trans-Texas Airways flights were operated within the state of Texas with Douglas DC-3s which the airline called "Starliners". In November 1949, it served Alpine, Beaumont/Port Arthur, Beeville, Brownsville, Brownwood, Carrizo Springs/Crystal City, Coleman, Dallas (Love Field), Del Rio, Eagle Pass, El Paso, Fort Stockton, Fort Worth, Galveston, Harlingen, Houston (Hobby Airport), Laredo, Lufkin, Marfa, McAllen, Palestine, San Angelo, San Antonio, Uvalde, Van Horn, and Victoria.

The network expanded to Memphis and Marshall in 1953, Lafayette in 1956, New Orleans and Jackson in 1959, into Mexico in 1967, and to Denver in 1969. In late 1963 the carrier added 13 new cities by taking over service formerly operated by Continental Airlines. These cities included Albuquerque, Carlsbad, Clovis, Hobbs, Roswell, and Santa Fe in New Mexico as well as Abilene, Amarillo, Big Spring, College Station, Lubbock, Temple, and Waco in Texas.

About April 1961, Convair 240s formerly operated by American Airlines began carrying Trans-Texas passengers; the airline later converted them to Convair 600s, replacing the piston engines with Rolls-Royce Dart turboprop engines. These turboprop powered Convair aircraft were referred to by the airline as the "Jet Powered TTa Silver Cloud 600". First scheduled CV-600 flights were in March 1966. Small Beechcraft C99 commuter turboprops were later added to serve the smaller cities of Longview, Lufkin, Galveston, Tyler and Victoria (the last DC-3 flight was in 1968).

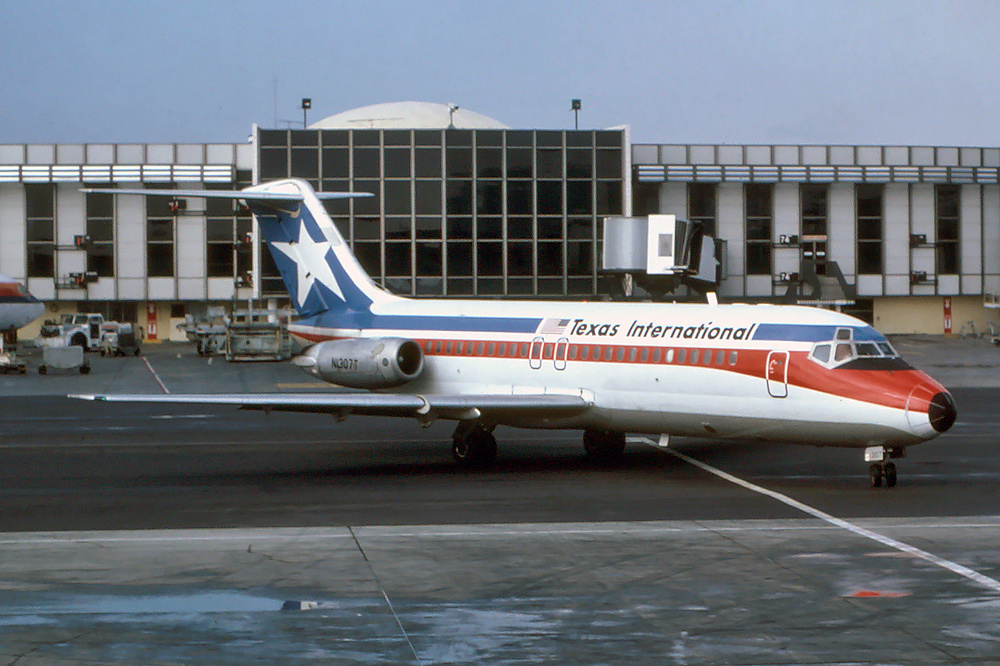
A Texas International Airlines DC-9-15 at Los Angeles International Airport

In October 1966, Trans-Texas Airways introduced the Douglas DC-9-10 (which the airline marketed as the "Pamper-jet") with its jet fleet subsequently being expanded to nineteen DC-9-10s and seven McDonnell Douglas DC-9-30s. By 1968, TTa was flying DC-9s to Beaumont/Port Arthur; Harlingen; Hot Springs, Arkansas, Lake Charles, Louisiana; Roswell, New Mexico, and Santa Fe, New Mexico in addition to larger cities in its route system. DC-9's briefly flew to Clovis, New Mexico, Carlsbad, New Mexico, and Hobbs, New Mexico in 1977. Also, in 1977, Texas International became the first airline to ban cigar and pipe smoking onboard.

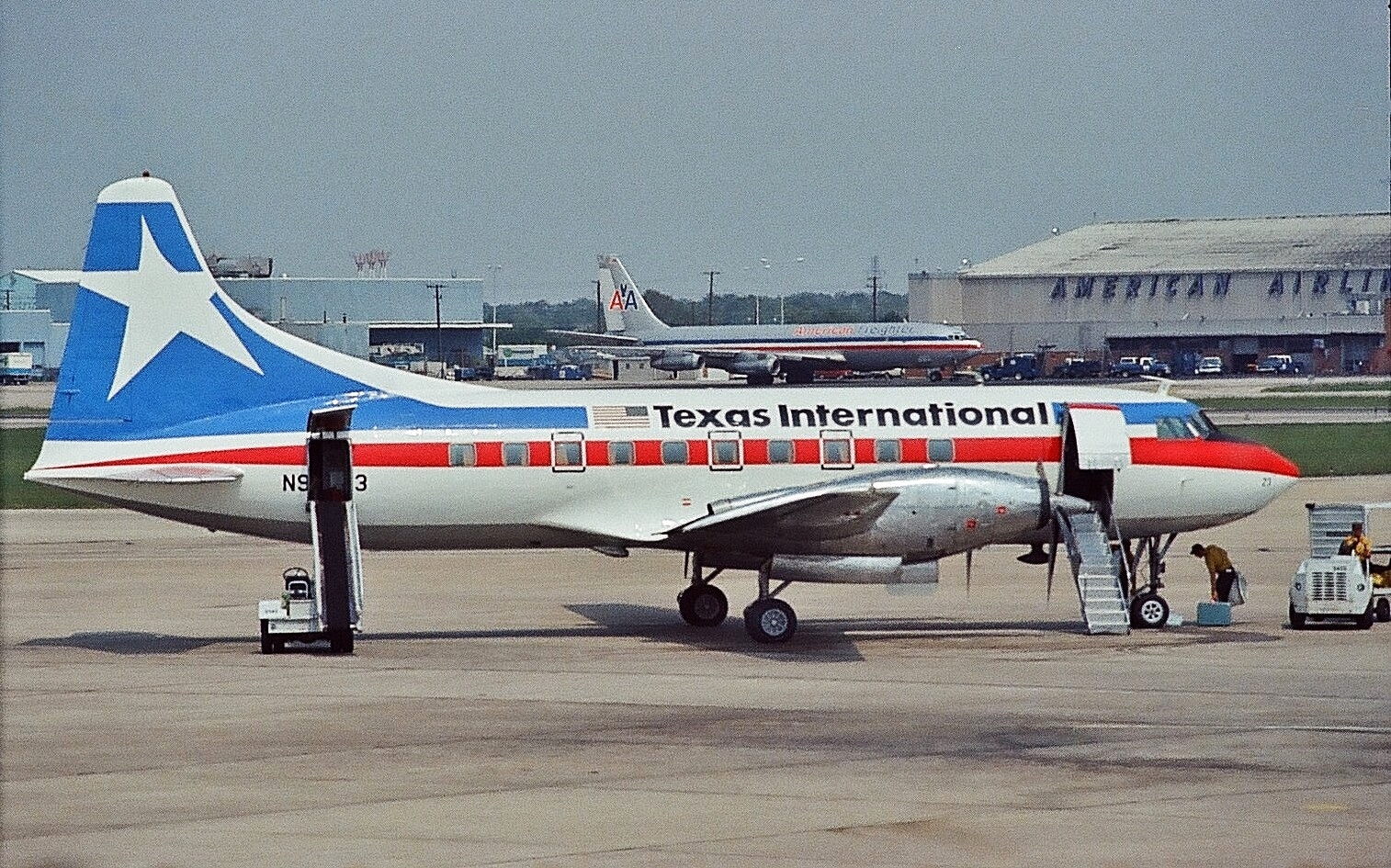
A Texas International Airlines Convair CV-600 at Dallas/Fort Worth, 1973

Trans-Texas was derisively called "Tree Top Airlines," "Tinker Toy Airlines", and "Teeter-Totter Airlines" by competitors and cynical customers. When it changed its name to Texas International Airlines in April 1969, the company ran newspaper ads showing a Tinker Toy airplane flying along treetops. The copy read "No More Tinker Toys. No More Treetops. We are now Texas International Airlines." As Texas International, the airline standardized on the DC-9 and Convair 600. The last Convair 600 flights were in 1979 and Texas International became all-jet with DC-9-10s and DC-9-30s.

In 1970, Texas International served: Abilene, Amarillo, Austin, Beaumont/Port Arthur, Big Spring, Brownwood, Bryan/College Station, Corpus Christi, Dallas/Ft. Worth, El Paso, Galveston, Harlingen, Houston, Laredo, Longview, Lubbock, Lufkin, McAllen, Midland/Odessa, San Angelo, San Antonio, Temple, Tyler, Victoria, Waco, and Wichita Falls, Texas.

Outside of Texas in 1970, Texas International flew to Arkansas (El Dorado, Hot Springs, Jonesboro, Little Rock, Pine Bluff and Texarkana); California (Los Angeles); Colorado, (Denver); Louisiana (Alexandria, Baton Rouge, Fort Polk, Lafayette, Lake Charles, Monroe, New Orleans and Shreveport); Mississippi (Jackson); New Mexico (Albuquerque, Carlsbad, Clovis, Hobbs, Roswell and Santa Fe); Tennessee (Memphis); and Utah (Salt Lake City). In Mexico, flights reached Monterrey, Tampico, Mérida and Veracruz. The airline had several "milk run" flights, such as flight 904, a DC-9-10 that left Los Angeles at 11:00 a.m. and stopped in Albuquerque, Roswell, Midland/Odessa, Dallas/Ft. Worth, Houston, and Beaumont/Port Arthur, before arriving in Lafayette at 8:34 p.m.

After suffering annual losses of up to $3 million, Texas International was acquired in 1972 by Jet Capital Corporation headed by 32-year-old Frank Lorenzo. The airline quickly realized a $6 million profit, largely due to wage cuts spearheaded by Lorenzo and sharp marketing efforts.

In the mid-1970s, in response to competition from Southwest Airlines, Texas International successfully petitioned the Civil Aeronautics Board to allow discounted fares. These fares become a staple of the airline and were advertised as "Peanuts Fares". In spring 1978, the airline was flying nonstop between Dallas/Ft. Worth (DFW) and both Houston Intercontinental Airport (IAH) and Houston Hobby Airport (HOU), up to 18 round trip DC-9 flights a day, all with "Peanut Fares". The Texas International March 15, 1978 timetable advertised "Peanut Fares" in other markets as well.

The first modern frequent-flyer program was created at Texas International Airlines in 1979 called "Payola Passes." Lacking the computer resources of their larger competitors, Texas International was overtaken by American's introduction of AAdvantage in May 1981.

On June 11, 1980, Lorenzo established a holding company, Texas Air Corporation, for Texas International and New York Air, the first holding company in the airline industry. Texas Air then acquired Continental Airlines in 1982 and merged Continental and Texas International on October 31, 1982, under the former's name. The last Texas International aircraft were seen in 1983.

Today's successor to Trans-Texas Airways and Texas International is United Airlines, which merged with Continental in 2010. United currently operates a large hub at Houston George Bush Intercontinental Airport (IAH), a former hub for Texas International. The Dallas/Fort Worth International Airport (DFW) was also a hub for Texas International before its merger with Continental.

== Fleet ==
World Airline Fleets 1979 (copyright 1978) lists the following for Texas International:

- 15 DC-9-14
- 4 DC-9-15
- 6 DC-9-31
- 1 DC-9-32
- 3 CV-600

== Accidents ==
- On February 6, 1969, Douglas DC-9-15MC N1304T collided in midair with a small, single engined Piper PA-28 aircraft over Harlingen, Texas; the Piper crashed, seriously injuring the pilot; the DC-9 landed safely with no casualties to the 59 on board.
- On September 27, 1973, Flight 655, a Convair 600, crashed in Arkansas while on a scheduled passenger/cargo flight from El Dorado, Arkansas, to Texarkana, Arkansas; all 11 on board died. This accident was the only fatal accident involving the airline, as well as the only fatal accident involving the Convair 600.
- On November 16, 1976, Flight 987, a Douglas DC-9-14 (N9104) overran the runway and crashed on takeoff from Denver Stapleton International Airport (DEN) due to an unexplained malfunction of the stall warning system; all 86 on board survived, but the aircraft was written off.
- On March 17, 1980, Douglas DC-9-14 N9103 overran the runway while landing in rain at Baton Rouge Ryan Airport (BTR) due to pilot and ATC errors; all 50 on board survived, but the aircraft was written off.

== See also ==
- List of defunct airlines of the United States
- Texas Air Corporation
