= Corporate headquarters =

Part of a corporate structure that deals with important tasks

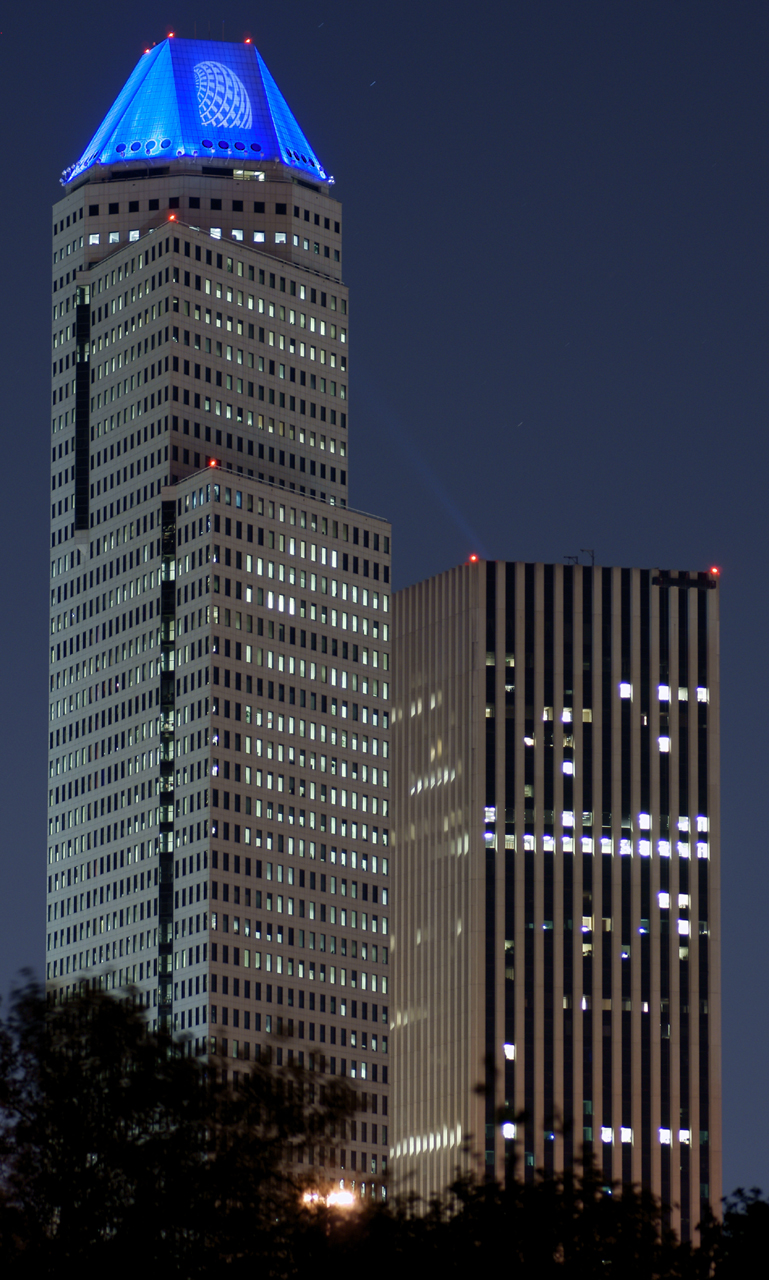
The Continental Center I and the KBR Tower, both part of the Cullen Center complex in Downtown Houston, have the corporate headquarters of Continental Airlines and KBR, respectively.

Corporate headquarters is the part of a corporate structure that deals with tasks such as strategic planning, corporate communications, taxes, law, books of record, marketing, finance, human resources, and information technology. Corporate headquarters takes responsibility for the overall success of the corporation and ensures corporate governance. It is sometimes referred to as the head office, which is the location where the executives of a business work and where many of the key business decisions are made. Generally, corporate headquarters acts as a core when the business is operating.

The corporate headquarters includes: the CEO (chief executive officer) as a key person and their support staff such as the CEO office and other CEO related functions; the "corporate policy making" functions: Include all corporate functions necessary to steer the firm by defining and establishing corporate policies; the corporate services: Activities that combine or consolidate certain enterprise-wide needed support services, provided based on specialized knowledge, best practices, and technology to serve internal (and sometimes external) customers and business partners; the interface: Reporting line and bi-directional link between corporate headquarters and business units. Most other divisions and branches report to the corporate headquarters and staff may visit there periodically for training or other instructions". The corporate services are often relocated into a separate legal entity called shared services center. Research shows that the city in which a company is headquartered has a significant influence on the company's activities, including its business practices and its corporate philanthropic giving.

== Locations of corporate headquarters ==
Corporate headquarters is considered a business's most prestigious location. A corporation's headquarters may also bring prestige to the city it is located in and help attract other businesses to the area. Businesses frequently locate their corporate headquarters in large cities, such as New York, because of the greater business opportunities available there. The corporate headquarters may or may not be in the location in which the business is incorporated or where the majority of its employees work. Offices of a business that are not the corporate headquarters are called "branch offices". The headquarters is often selected by the founders of the company to be conveniently located to where they live. Branch offices may then be opened, either locally, within the country or internationally. Companies, however, generally do not have two corporate headquarters, even if they are international companies, although they may have branches that take on some of the responsibility for making corporate decisions in other countries. For example, if a company is headquartered in New York but has an office in London, the company may assign a specific location in London to act as the London headquarters and to perform the tax function and legal compliance function within the United Kingdom.

== Roles of corporate headquarters ==
=== Public company functions ===
Most of the multi-business firms have their corporate headquarters performs obligatory functions. It represents all businesses legally in respect of the regulator(s) and aggregates the financial, tax, and legal data. Similarly, the corporate headquarters can also function as the company's face to the customer and build reputational value.

=== Shared services ===
Shared services are services provided by the corporate headquarters for various business units. Owing to the aggregation of demand for these services, the headquarters can realize scale effects and provide them at lower total costs. Typical shared services are HR, IT, and marketing services.

=== Value creation ===
In contrast to the first two roles, the "value creation role" of the corporate headquarters is more entrepreneurial in nature. It is considered the major source of corporate advantages and key in justifying the configuration of diversified companies. It comprises various horizontal and vertical coordination activities, such as the leveraging of the synergy potential and the application of management innovation.

=== Control ===
The "control role" of the corporate headquarter guides the operations of the individual businesses toward the corporate goals. It can either focus on the financial outcome, or the operational behaviour, with both options implying very different approaches and requirements in terms of data and operations.

== Consequences brought by scaling corporate headquarters ==
Corporate headquarter change	Potential advantages	Potential disadvantages
Scaling corporate headquarter up	Increased coordination and synergy realization; Build up of corporate headquarters capabilities; Compliance with regulatory requirements	Additional overheads and costs; Bureaucracy and inappropriate interference; Value destruction
No change	Stability at the top: stable processes and networks; Low risk of organisational disruption; No additional costs	Misalignment between internal and external environment; Breeds impression of inactivity in the business units
Scaling corporate headquarter down	Reduction of overhead and cost savings; Reduction of bureaucracy and interference; Clarification of responsibilities	Restructuring costs; Deterioration of headquarters' capabilities; Harmful reduction in corporate capabilities and networks

== See also ==
- Head office
- Lists of corporate headquarters by city
