= 1600 Smith Street =

Skyscraper in Houston, Texas

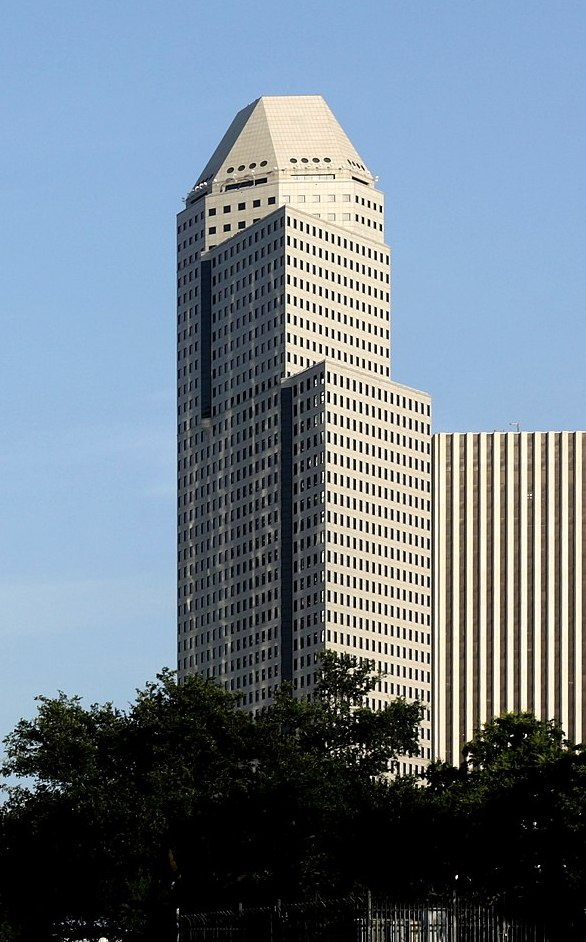
- 1600 Smith Street (formerly Continental Center I)

General information
- Status: Completed
- Type: Office
- Location: Downtown Houston, Texas, United States
- Coordinates: 29.75518°N 95.37275°W
- Completed: 1984; 42 years ago
- Owner: Brookfield Properties
- Operator: Brookfield Properties

Height
- Roof: 732 ft (223 m)

Technical details
- Floor count: 53
- Floor area: 1,097,960 sq ft (102,004 m^{2})

Design and construction
- Architect: Morris Architects (formerly Morris Aubry)

1600 Smith Street (previously named Continental Center I and also known as Cullen Center Plaza) is a 51-story, 732-foot (223 m) office tower in Downtown Houston, Texas, United States. It served as the headquarters of Continental Airlines prior to its merger with United Airlines in 2010, and at one point also served as the headquarters of ExpressJet Airlines. It is a part of the Cullen Center complex.

The 51 story building has about 1,098,399 square feet (102,044.6 m^{2}) of rentable Class "A" office space. The design architect was Morris Architects, the general contractor was Linbeck Construction Company, the mechanical engineer was I.A. Naman, and the structural engineer was CBM Engineers. The building was completed in 1984.

The tower stands as a postmodern-style building. It is currently the 9th-tallest building in Houston.

== History ==
Bruce Nichols of The Dallas Morning News said that in early 1984, 1600 Smith Street "was so vacant it became a symbol for overexpansion in Houston". By 1987 the Canadian company Trizec Group bought debentures carrying an option to buy portions of the Cullen Center, including 1600 Smith Street. In 1997 subcommittees of the University of Houston System Board of Regents held meetings at 1600 Smith Street.

In September 1997, Continental Airlines announced that it would consolidate its Houston headquarters in what would become Continental Center I. The airline scheduled to move around 3,200 employees in stages beginning in July 1998 and ending in January 1999. The airline consolidated the headquarters operation at the America Tower in Neartown and three other local operations into Continental Center I and Continental Center II in the Cullen Center. Continental anticipated taking 15 floors at Continental Center I. In addition it planned to add a company store, a credit union, and an employee service center in the street-level lobby of Continental Center I. The airline agreed to lease 600,000 square feet (56,000 m^{2}) of space in the Cullen Center for 11 years initially and 20 years if it takes renewal options.

To make room for the airline and to increase the complex's overall tenancy, Trizec negotiated with the Shell Oil Company to renew a lease of 320,000 square feet (30,000 m^{2}) that was scheduled to expire in 1998. The unit of Shell Oil Company agreed to reduce its 320,000 square feet (30,000 m^{2}) square feet of space in Continental Center I to 170,000 square feet (16,000 m^{2}) to make room for Continental. Shell had planned to downsize, so it renewed its lease for a smaller amount of space. In addition Houston Industries, Inc. paid TrizecHahn so it could break its lease on 100,000 square feet (9,300 m^{2}) of space. This made additional room for Continental Airlines.

Tim Reylea, the vice president of Cushman Realty Corp., said that the Continental move "is probably the largest corporate relocation in the central business district of Houston ever". Bob Lanier, Mayor of Houston, said that he was "tickled to death" by the airline's move to relocate to Downtown Houston. In September 2000 an electrical component burned out at Continental Center I, and the Houston Fire Department shut off the backup power supply as a precaution. As a result of the temporary power outage, delays of between 300 and 400 Continental Airlines flights occurred worldwide. The Texas bureau of Jesse Jackson's Wall Street Project opened in office space in Continental Center I in May 2001. After the September 11 attacks and by September 2004 Continental laid off 24% of its clerical and management workers. Despite the reduction of the workforce, Continental did not announce any plans to sublease any of its space in Continental Center I and Continental Center II.

In 2004, three new lease agreements to occupy space in Continental Center I were signed. Nancy Sarnoff of the Houston Business Journal said that the three to five year terms were "considerably short" for leasing agreements; she added that the short leases were due to an abundance of capacity in the Downtown office market, which allowed tenants to have more say in their agreements. Southwest Bank of Texas (now Amegy Bank) agreed to occupy 23,271 square feet (2,161.9 m^{2}). Tana Exploration Co. LLC agreed to occupy 11,347 square feet (1,054.2 m^{2}). Stinnett Thiebaud & Remington LLP agreed to occupy 8,974 square feet (833.7 m^{2}).

In February 2006 Chevron U.S.A. Inc. signed a lease for 465,000 square feet (43,200 m^{2}) of space. The lease deal filled the building to full occupancy and removed a large portion of available space from the Downtown Houston submarket. Tim Relyea, the vice chairperson of Cushman & Wakefield of Texas Inc., said that Chevron considered other properties before deciding on Continental Center I. He did not state which other towers the company had considered. Chevron planned to place 1,300 employees in 20 floors in the building. The company planned to begin moving employees into the tower by the third quarter of 2006. Prior to the signing of the lease agreement, rumors stated that the company was looking for more office space in Downtown Houston.

In 2008, Continental renewed its lease for around 450,000 square feet (42,000 m^{2}) in Continental Center I. Before the lease renewal, rumors spread stating that the airline would relocate its headquarters to office space around George Bush Intercontinental Airport due to high fuel costs affecting the airline industry; the rumors stated that the airline was studying possibilities of less expensive alternatives to Continental Center I. If the airline had left Continental Center I, 40% of the space in the building would have been unoccupied. Steven Biegel, the senior vice president of Studley Inc. and a representative of office building tenants, said that the square footage renewed by Continental is a significant amount of space. Biegel added that if the space went vacant, the vacancy would not have had a significant impact in the Downtown Houston submarket as there is not an abundance of available space, and that another potential tenant would likely occupy it. Jennifer Dawson of the Houston Business Journal said that if Continental Airlines left Continental Center I, the development of Brookfield Properties's new office tower would have been delayed. The parties did not reveal the terms of the lease agreement. As of September 2008, Continental Center I was 98% leased.

On May 2, 2010, Continental Airlines and United Airlines announced that they would merge and that the headquarters of the combined company would be in the Chicago Loop in Chicago. As of 2010, Continental had around 3,000 clerical and management workers in its Downtown Houston offices and leased 450,000 square feet (42,000 m^{2}) in Continental Center I, about 40% of the tower's office space. United continued to occupy space in the building following the merger’s completion in October 2010, but stated in December 2011 that it would not renew the lease for 142,000 square feet (13,200 m^{2}) of space on six floors. By February 2016, United had reduced its leasehold at 1600 Smith to just 140,000 square feet (13,000 m^{2}), and announced it would be leaving at the end of 2017 for new space at 609 E Main.

In July 2011, Chevron renewed a lease for 311,000 square feet (28,900 m^{2}) of space for seven years.

As of July 2018, the building was 69% leased with over 500,000 square feet available.

On October 8, 2025, it was announced that Houston City Council approved the purchase of the building for use as the new headquarters for the Houston Police Department and Houston Public Works, among other city departments.

== Design ==
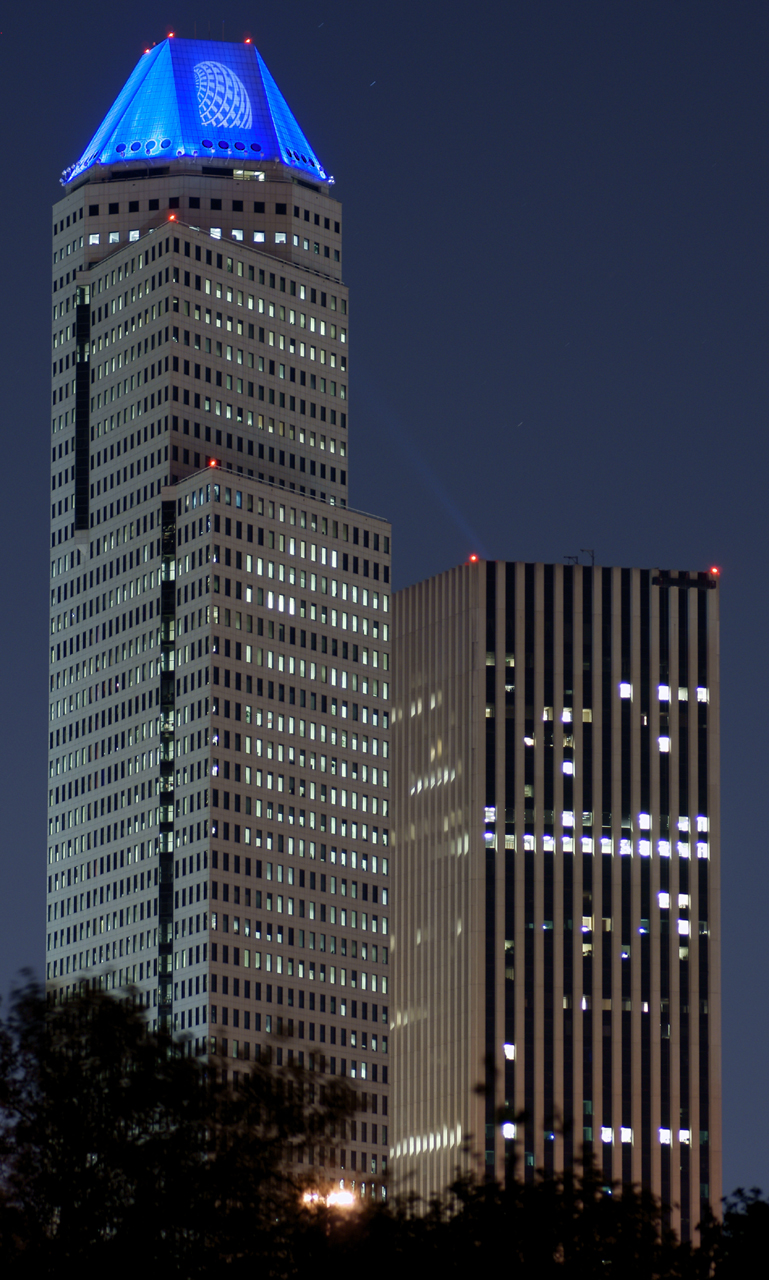
Continental Center I at night (left) in July 2008, with the KBR Tower. Continental Center I had a blue lighting pattern that was added after the Houston City Council approved an amended ordinance permitting Continental Airlines to place its logo on the building.

Continental Center I includes a blue lighting pattern on the roof that displays the Continental Airlines logo. The light had been kept off for a period before May 2010. After Continental had occupied the building, the airline wanted to display its logo on the roof of Continental Center I. The City of Houston had a 1993 ordinance restricting the height of any new signs in Downtown Houston to 42.5 feet (13.0 m). On Wednesday August 2, 2000, the Houston City Council voted 10–4 to stop enforcing the informal agreement and enact a new law that exempts a company from the height restriction if the national headquarters of a company occupies 45 percent or more of a Downtown Houston building of over 750,000 square feet (70,000 m^{2}) of usable space. The Mayor of Houston, Lee P. Brown, said that he supported the ordinance change since it was a promise made by Bob Lanier to the airline in exchange for enticing the company to move its headquarters to Continental Center I. Opponents of the change feared that company logos would become more prevalent in the Downtown Houston skyline.

The elevators were manufactured by Fujitec.

== In popular culture ==
- 1600 Smith Street was featured in a significant portion of the 1990 film RoboCop 2 as the headquarters of the fictional Omni Consumer Products Corporation. Several building locations were utilized as sets for the film, including the exterior, and the main lobby area which was staged as a large executive office.

== Gallery ==
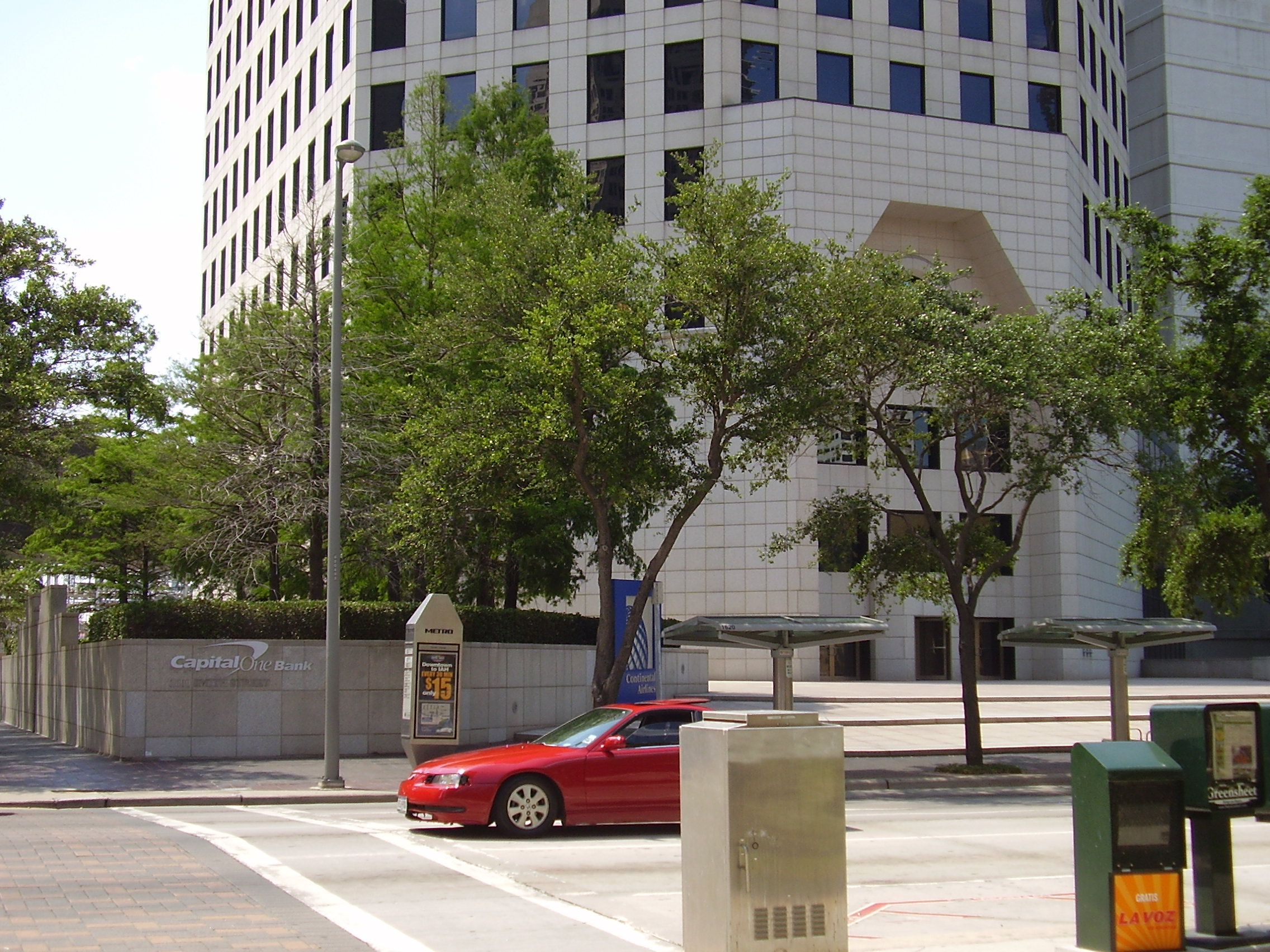
Base of Continental Center I

== See also ==
- List of tallest buildings in Houston
- List of tallest buildings in the United States
- Continental Airlines
- ExpressJet Airlines
