= Cullen Center =

Building complex in Houston, Texas, U.S.

Coordinates: 29.753°N 95.373°W

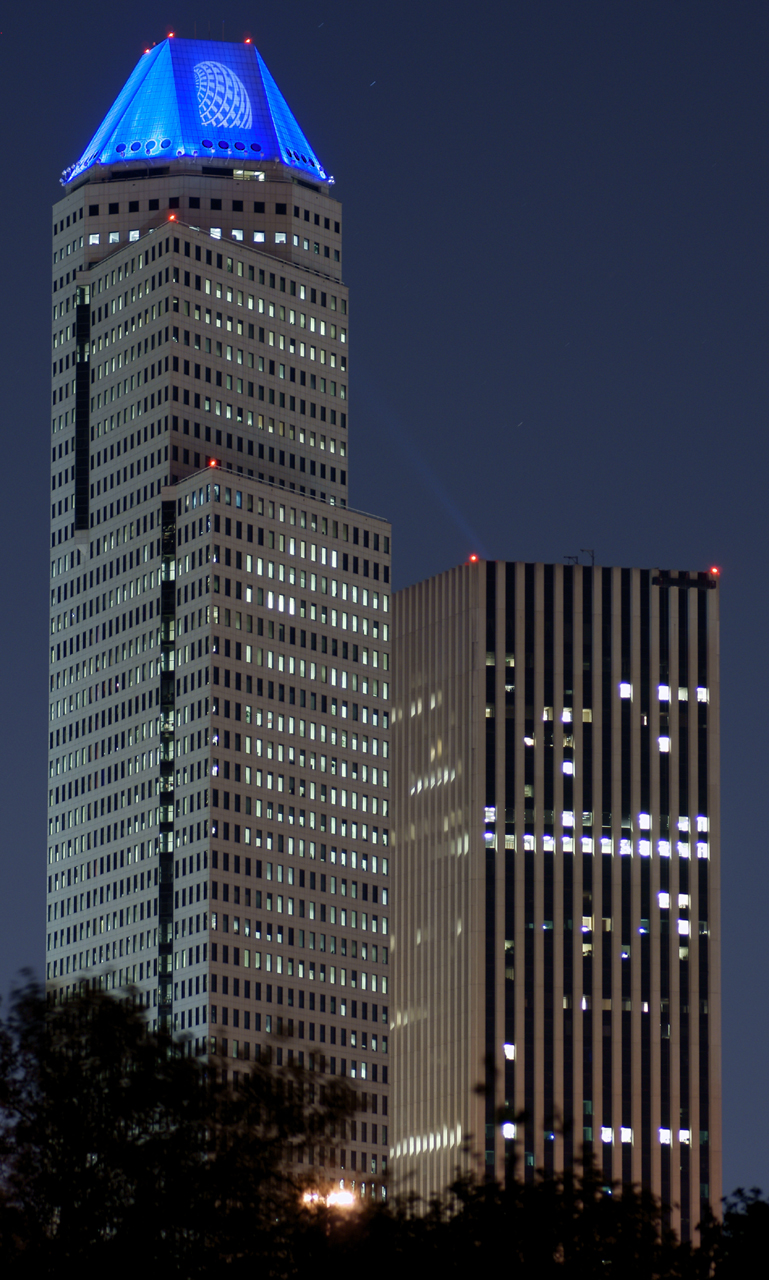
Continental Center I (now 1600 Smith) and KBR Tower at night

Cullen Center is a skyscraper complex in Downtown Houston, Texas, United States. The complex is now managed by Brookfield Properties. Previously Trizec Properties owned all four office buildings. The complex includes the headquarters of the Houston Fire Department and KBR, and it formerly included the headquarters of Continental Airlines.

The buildings include 1600 Smith (formerly Continental Center I), 600 Jefferson (formerly Continental Center II), KBR Tower, and 500 Jefferson Street.

== History ==
In 1959, the family of Hugh Roy Cullen, an oil businessperson and philanthropist who was recently deceased, announced that they would build a skyscraper complex in Downtown Houston. To the surprise of everyone the family planned for the 12 acres (4.9 ha), 5½ city block site to accommodate several sites. The first two buildings were to be a 500-room, 15–18 story hotel and a 25-story office building. Next, a 40–45 story office building was to be completed. Other buildings were planned to be added at later times. Gerald E. Veitmann, president of the Cullen Center, said that it was going to be "a memorium to Mr. and Mrs. Cullen, an investment in excess of 100 million dollars," and "to Houston what Rockefeller Center is to New York City." Work for clearing the land was scheduled to begin in December 1959. During the year, the family's plans also included another 25 story office building and a parking garage. Construction of the Cullen Center, which was planned to have around one dozen buildings, was scheduled to begin on October 1, 1960, with the first building being a 21-story office building with an attached parking garage.

Welton Becket and Associates master planned the first two buildings, the 21 story, $12 million 500 Jefferson and the 12-story, $6 million Hotel America. Gerald E. Veltmann, the president of Cullen Center, Inc. said that the development "represents a marked departure from the traditional downtown scene and colors" because the development "centers around a planning concept with four separate levels structures: sub surface, used for parking and mechanical equipment; surface, used for vehicular traffic, parking, entrance lobbies, and service entrances, a second level, used for pedestrian-oriented facilities such as main lobbies, shops, displays, galleries, lounges, and restaurants; and the top space, into which will rise the main towers containing hotel rooms and offices." In other words, the building design separated the pedestrian and vehicular traffic from one another. The first levels were to have open plazas. The developer planned to establish air-conditioned bridges connecting the buildings at their second levels. The architect, Welton Becket of FAIA, said that the two original buildings were "esthetically related through the use of a common material—concrete—in a variety of forms—physically related by the second-level pedestrian bridges, and visually related around open plaza parking areas and a common exposed aggregate sidewalk roads."

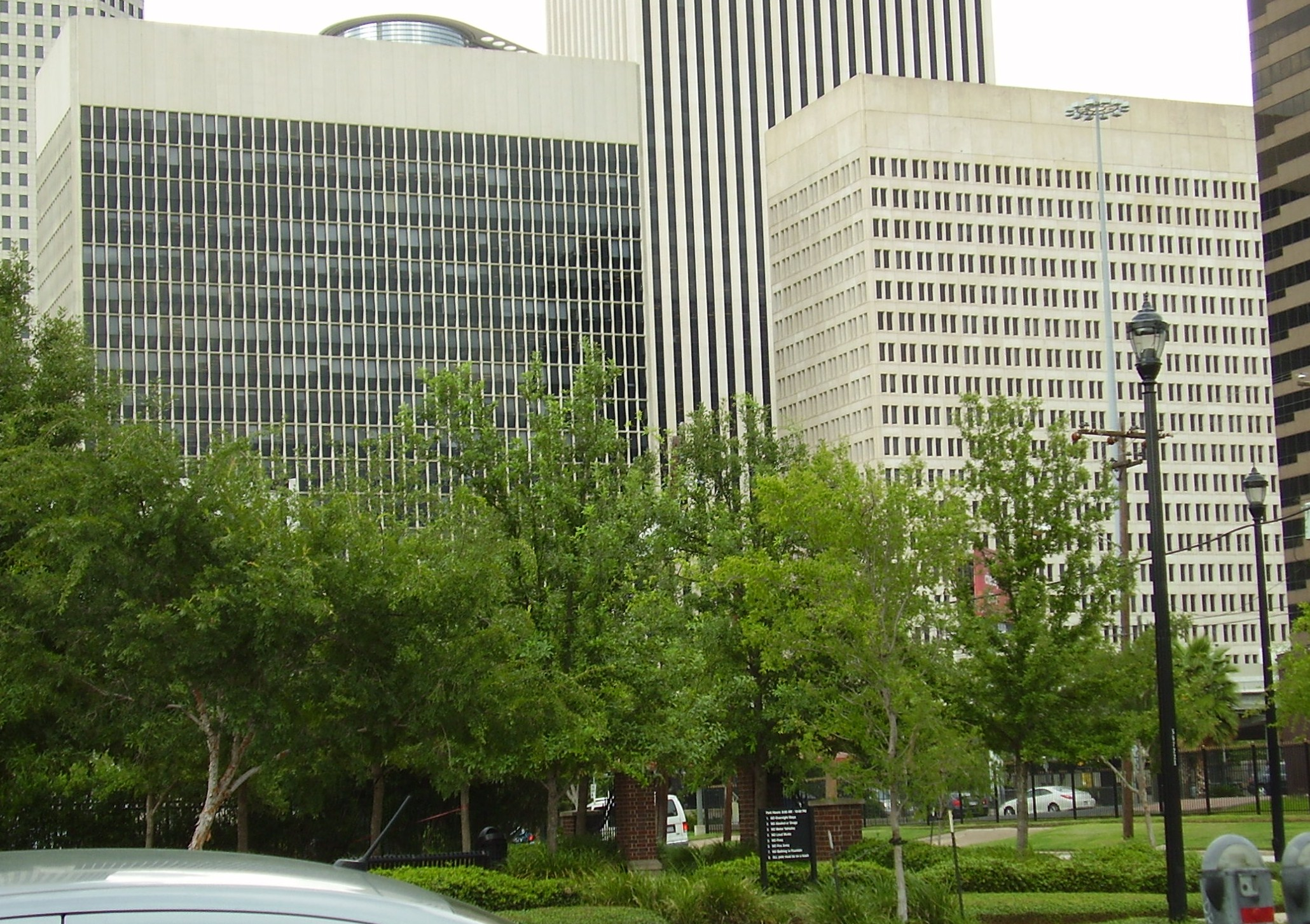
500 Jefferson (left) and 600 Jefferson (right)

500 Jefferson opened in 1962. Continental Center II opened in 1974. The KBR Tower was built in 1973 and renovated in 1991. Continental Center I was completed in 1984.

By 1987, the Canadian company Trizec Corporation bought debentures carrying an option to buy portions of the Cullen Center, including 1600 Smith Street.

By 1991, the M. W. Kellogg Company, which has already taken space at the M. W. Kellogg Tower formerly held by its parent company, leased an additional 250,000 square feet (23,000 m^{2}) of space on 12 floors within one building in Cullen Center.

By 1997, Trizec had convinced several Cullen Center tenants to move to the nearby Allen Center, which was also owned by Trizec. During that year Continental Airlines announced that it was moving its headquarters to the Cullen Center. Paul Layne, a vice president of the TrizecHahn Office division, said that the Continental move would raise the Cullen Center's occupancy rate from 81 percent in November 1996 to 94 percent.

Tim Reylea, the vice president of Cushman Realty Corp., said that the Continental move "is probably the largest corporate relocation in the central business district of Houston ever." Bob Lanier, Mayor of Houston, said that he was "tickled to death" by the airline's move to relocate to Downtown Houston.

In 2001, when Enron collapsed, it vacated 800,000 square feet (74,000 m^{2}) of space in the Allen Center and Cullen Center complexes in Downtown Houston.

In 2008, Continental signed five-year lease renewals for its Downtown Houston office space. In 2010, Continental Airlines and United Airlines announced that they would merge and that the headquarters of the combined company would be in the Chicago Loop. Continental had not stated how much of the 480,000 square feet (45,000 m^{2}) of space that it leases in Continental Center I and the 220,000 square feet (20,000 m^{2}) of space that it leases in Continental Center II will be vacated. In 2016 United had the same square footage in Cullen Center, but chose not to renew the existing leases in 2017, and instead planned to move its Houston offices to 609 Main at Texas.

== 500 Jefferson ==
- 500 Jefferson Building
- U.S. National Register of Historic Places
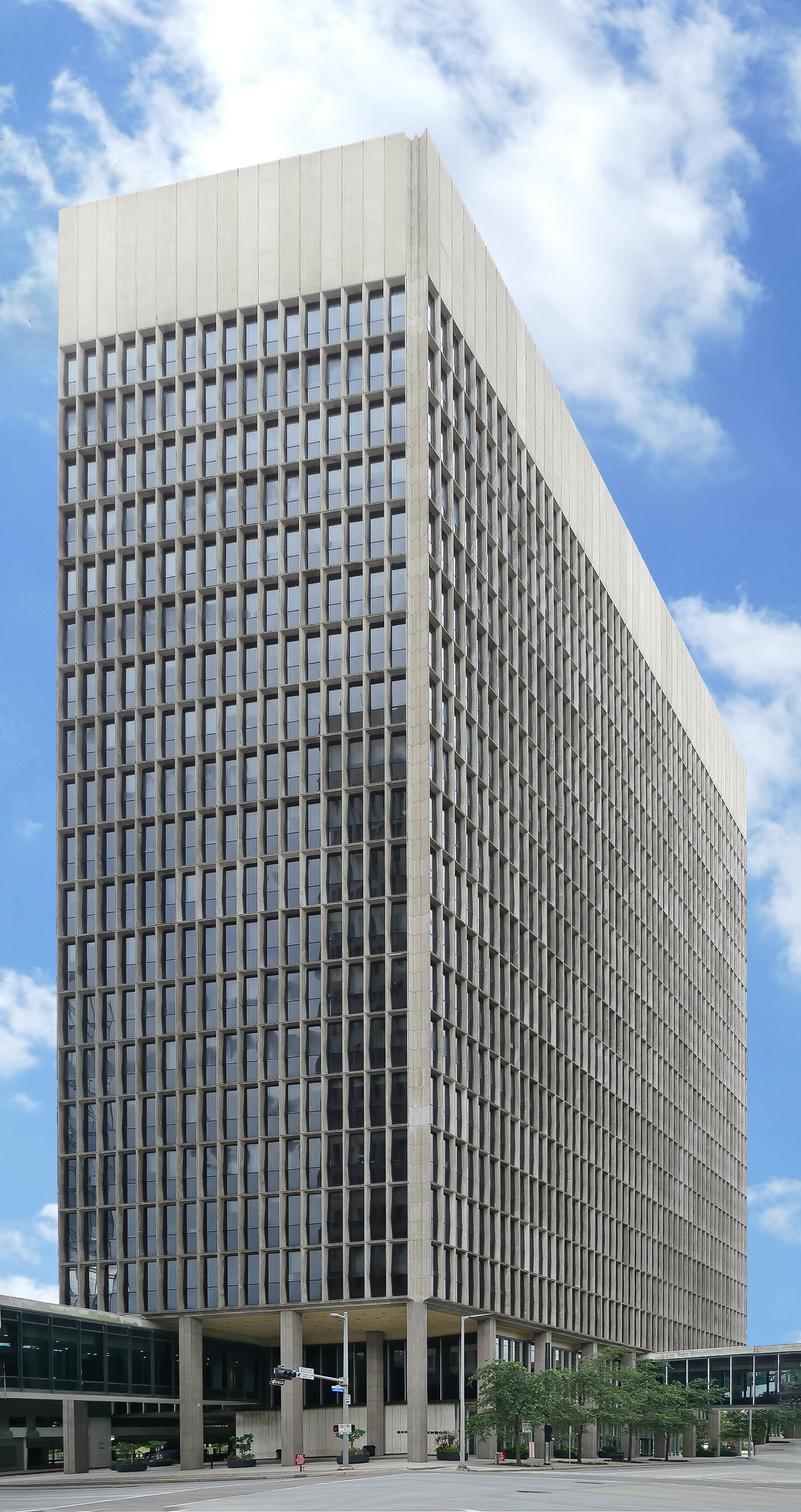
- NRHP reference No.: 100003492
- Added to NRHP: March 6, 2019

500 Jefferson, with its construction scheduled to begin on October 1, 1960, was the first building in Cullen Center to be developed. 500 Jefferson, which opened in 1962, has offices of KBR. The building has the headquarters of the Houston Fire Department (HFD). In addition, at one time Suite 1600 had the HFD Records Department.

In 2004, the law firm Lapin & Landa LLP signed a lease agreement to occupy 7,922 square feet (736.0 m^{2}) of space.

In 2010, KBR signed a 20-year lease for 1,200,000 square feet (110,000 m^{2}) at 500 Jefferson and the KBR Tower. In 2011 Brookfield Properties Corp. offered 500 Jefferson for sale. Paul Layne, Brookfield's Houston area executive vice president, said that the KBR lease made the building a major candidate for sale.

In 2013, an affiliate of W.P. Carey purchased 500 Jefferson.

== 1801 Smith ==
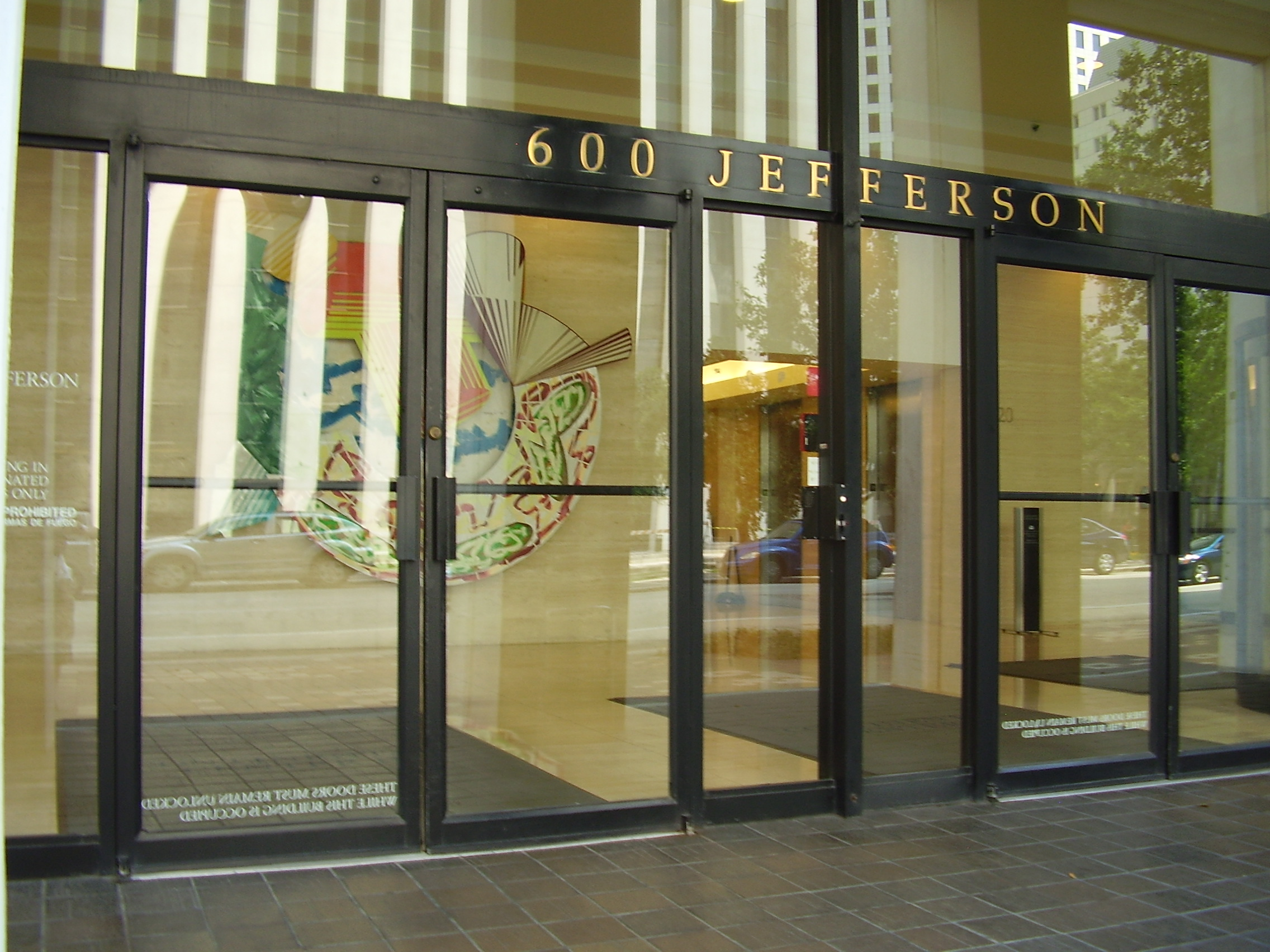
600 Jefferson

1801 Smith, previously Continental Center II, then 600 Jefferson, has 20 stories and 449,087 square feet (41,721.5 m^{2}). Neuhaus & Taylor was the design architect, Linbeck Construction Company was the general contractor, Chault & Brady was the mechanical engineer, and Elisor Engineering, Inc. was the structural engineer. The building was completed in 1972 and was renovated in 1998. As of November 2014, United Airlines is the primary tenant.

The Houston Fire Department has its administrative offices in the building. The administrative offices, the planning and homeland security division, and the HPD emergency operations division are located on the seventh floor. The training room is also on the seventh floor. The HFD chaplain, the fire codes division, the fire marshall/fire prevention division, the high rise certification division, the high rise inspections division, the public affairs division, and the firefighter recruiting division are located in Suite 600. The public education, public information office, special events, and staff services divisions are in Suite 700. The ambulance records, EMS records, fire records, and the medical director are in Suite 800.

Continental Airlines moved its employees into the Cullen Center, including Continental Center I and Continental Center II, in stages beginning in July 1998 and ending in January 1999. After the September 11 attacks and by September 2004, Continental laid off 24% of its clerical and management workers. Despite the reduction of the workforce, Continental did not announce any plans to sublease any of its space in Continental Center I and Continental Center II. As of 2008 the airline leases 200,000 square feet (19,000 m^{2}) at Continental Center II. As of that year it has not yet renewed its lease.

In 2009, at Continental Center II, Brookfield Properties began offering office suites from 1,200 square feet (110 m^{2}) to 2,000 square feet (190 m^{2}) to small businesses and laid off individuals seeking to start their own businesses.

In November 2014, Brookfield sold the building to DRA Advisors and Stream Realty Partners.

In addition to millions of dollars of renovations and upgrades, the property address was permanently changed in March 2017, to 1801 Smith Street, Houston, TX 77002.

== Hotel ==
The Whitehall Hotel Houston Downtown, is located in the Cullen Center. The hotel, initially planned as a 250-room, 10 story hotel, was built on a block bounded by Jefferson, Pease, and Smith, with the Brazos Street to the west. The Hotel Corporation of America began operating the hotel as Hotel America. The hotel was scheduled to be ready for occupancy in 1962. By 1961 the hotel, with a groundbreaking scheduled for August 31, 1961, was scheduled to have 327 rooms. The hotel has 12,000 square feet (1,100 m^{2}) for event groups.

== Retail ==
Continental Center I

- Ground Floor
  - Subway (Suite 125)
  - Continental Airlines Ticket Office (Suite 195)
- Concourse Level
  - Cafe Le Monde
  - Paradise Gifts

KBR Tower

- A Level Cafeteria
  - Kim Son
  - Subway
- Concourse Level
  - Frost Bank (with Motor Bank)

500 Jefferson Street

- Concourse Level
  - Continental Airlines Federal Credit Union

== Gallery ==
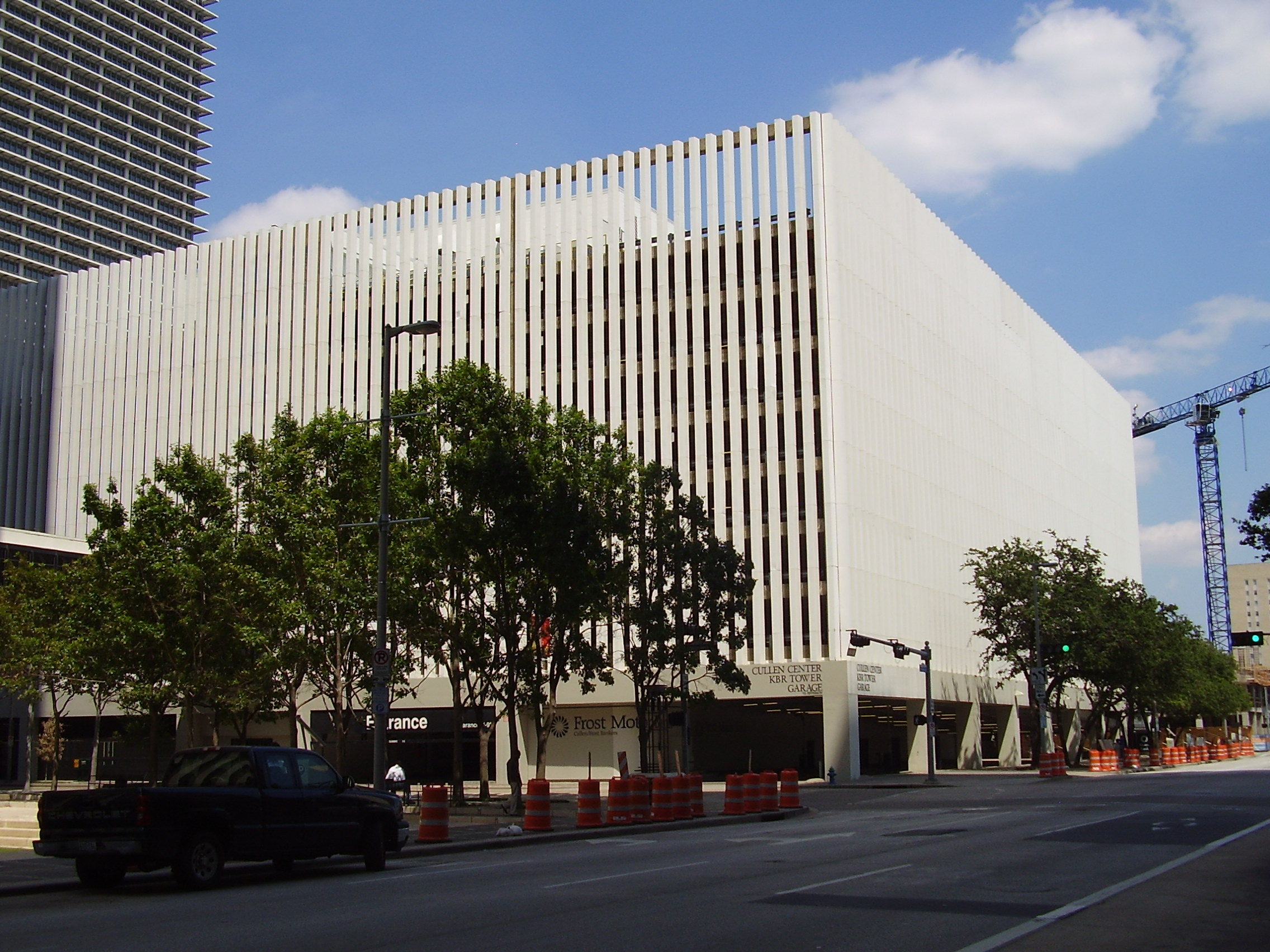
Cullen Center KBR Tower Garage

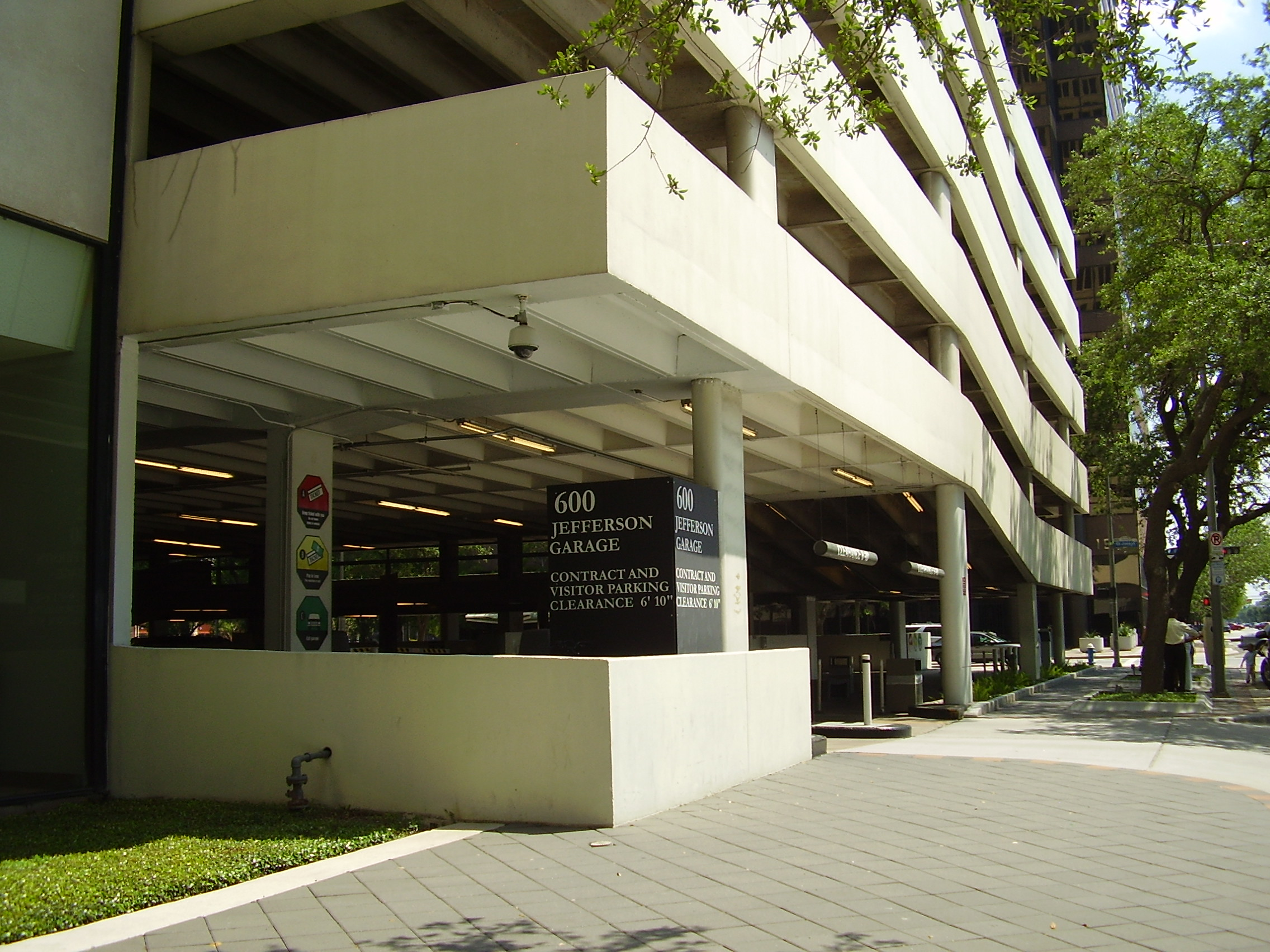
1801 Smith Garage
