= 609 Main at Texas =

Skyscraper in Houston, Texas

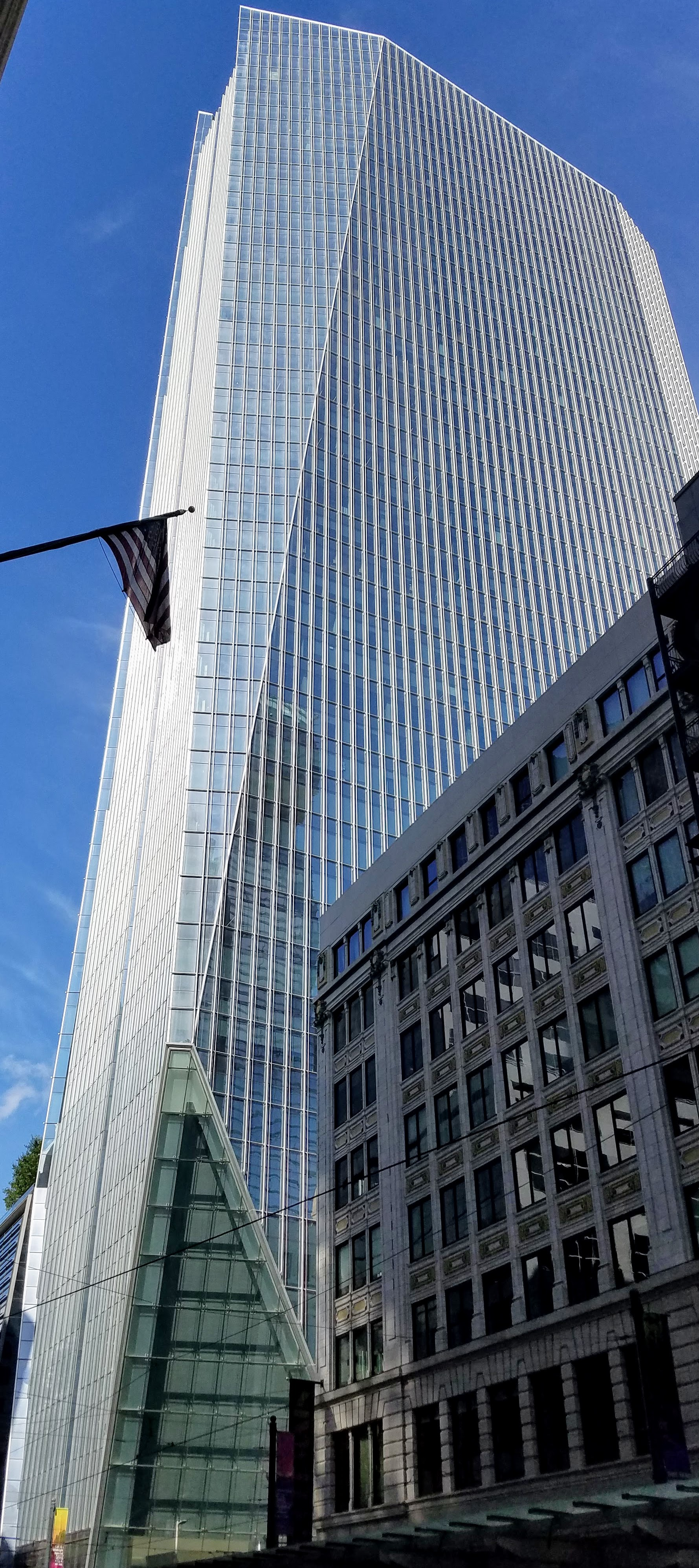
- Completed structure in August 2021

- Location within Texas

General information
- Status: Completed
- Type: Office tower
- Location: 609 Main Street, Houston, Texas, 77002
- Coordinates: 29.7594°N 95.3624°W
- Construction started: 2014
- Completed: February 2017
- Opening: May 2017

Height
- Height: 752 ft (229 m)
- Top floor: 48

Technical details
- Size: 1,087,090 ft^{2} (100,994 m^{2})
- Floor count: 50 (2 underground)
- Lifts/elevators: 23

Design and construction
- Architects: Kendall/Heaton Associates, Inc. Design architect: Pickard Chilton
- Developer: Hines
- Structural engineer: Cardno Haynes Whaley, Inc.
- Main contractor: Harvey Builders

609 Main at Texas (also referred to as Hines North Tower, Block 69) is a skyscraper in Houston, Texas.

The 48-story skyscraper was designed by the Connecticut-based architecture firm Pickard Chilton. The building management listed United Airlines as its anchor tenant, which occupied the spaces in 2018. The distinct launch feature of the building was its emphasis on sustainability: the tower received a platinum certification under the USGBC's LEED rating system, making it one of the most sustainable buildings in Houston in terms of energy efficiency and environmental impacts at the time. Notably, the tower has also featured garden rooftops as a beginning to future trend in Houston skyline.

== Construction ==
609 Main at Texas first came into public attention in 2011, with its estimated completion date set to be in 2013. Eventually, the construction for the building began in 2014, and was completed and opened in 2017 by the Hines Development Group.

== Modern status ==
The skyscraper is being actively occupied for the use between retail and office spaces. Out of the advertised total floor plate of 28,000 ft^{2} (2,600 m^{2}), the tower was 95 percent leased as of December 2020. The notable tenant companies included Kirkland & Ellis LLP, White & Case, Orrick, Herrington & Sutcliffe, EnVen Energy, Royal Bank of Canada, and Hogan Lovells, among others. The 609 Main ended up as one of the 31 projects which by now have defined Houston's skyline, constructed by the Hines' group over the last 50 years.

In 2016 United Airlines announced plans to leave 1600 Smith Street and move to 609 Main.

In January 2024, Pillsbury Winthrop Shaw Pittman leased the building's 20th floor, occupying 28,000 sq ft (2,600 m^{2}) of its floor area. In May 2026, Texas based Layne’s Chicken Fingers opened its restaurant in the building.

== See also ==
- List of tallest buildings in Houston
- List of tallest buildings in Texas
