= KBR Tower =

Skyscraper in Houston, Texas, US

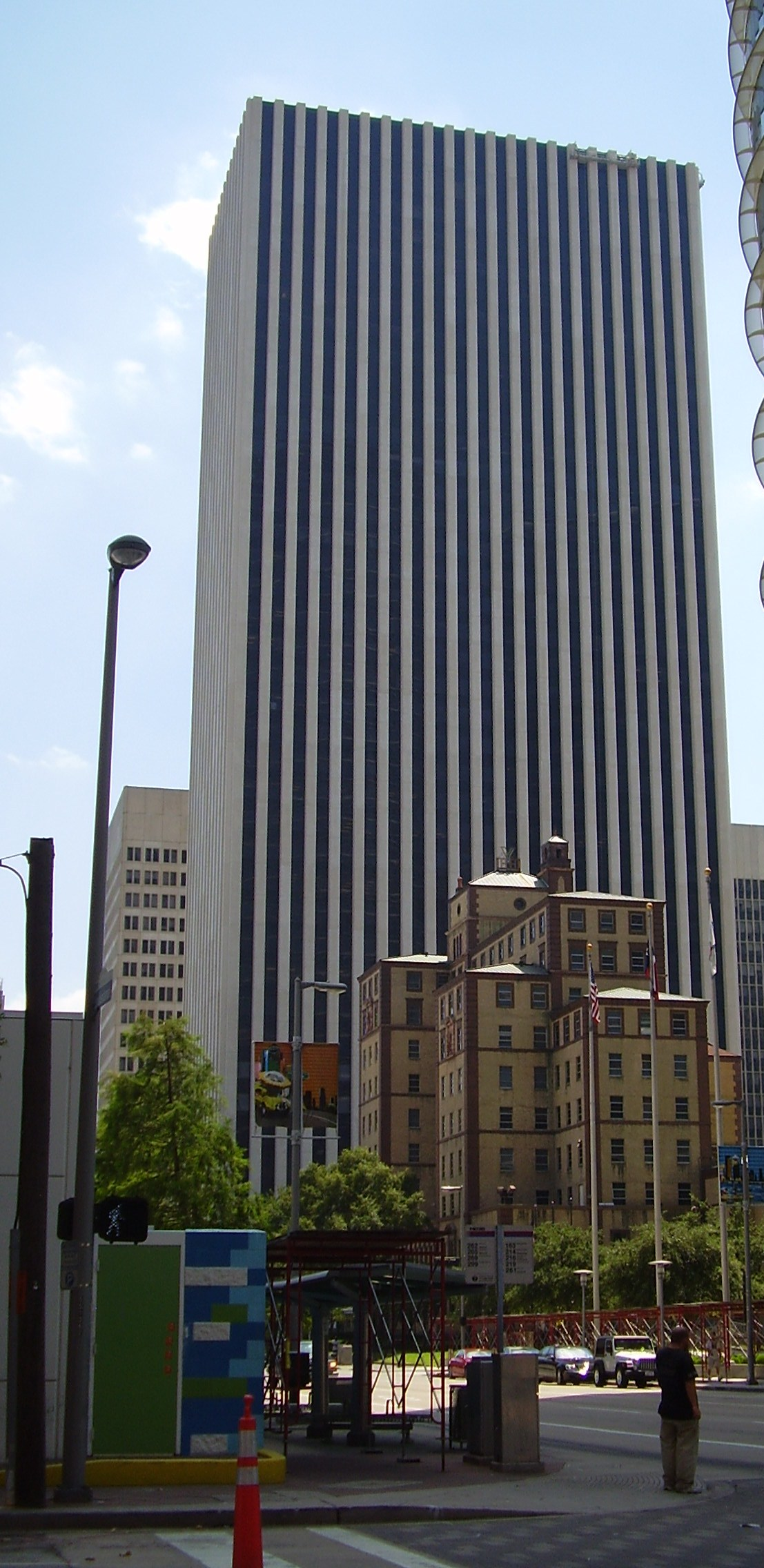
- The KBR Tower, with the Downtown Houston YMCA in front
- Interactive map of the KBR Tower area

General information
- Status: Completed
- Type: Office
- Location: 601 Jefferson Street, Houston, Texas
- Coordinates: 29.7533°N 95.3723°W
- Completed: 1973
- Owner: Trizec Properties
- Operator: Cushman Wakefield

Height
- Roof: 550 ft (170 m)

Technical details
- Floor count: 40
- Floor area: 1,047,744 sq ft (97,339 m^{2})

Design and construction
- Architects: Neuhaus & Taylor

KBR Tower (formerly the M. W. Kellogg Tower) is a 550 ft (167.6 m) tall skyscraper in Downtown Houston, Texas, United States; it is a part of the Cullen Center complex. The KBR Tower has the headquarters of KBR, Inc., an engineering, procurement, and construction company.

The 40 story building has about 1,047,748 square feet (97,339.0 m^{2}) of rentable office space. The design architect was Neuhaus & Taylor, the general contractor was Linbeck Construction Company, the mechanical engineer was Sam P. Wallace, and the structural engineer was Ellisor Engineering, Inc. The building was completed in 1973.

== History ==
By 1991, Dresser Industries and its subsidiary, M. W. Kellogg, switched office buildings. Kellogg took over 400,000 square feet (37,000 m^{2}) of space on 16 floors of the Houston skyscraper formerly occupied by its parent firm. The skyscraper was renamed the M. W. Kellogg Tower. In exchange Dresser took over space at 3 Greenway Plaza, which had been renamed to the Dresser Tower. The building swap satisfied Kellogg's need for more space.

In 1998, Exxon announced that it was forming a new subsidiary, Exxon Upstream Development Co. The company planned to initially house the company in the Kellogg Tower before moving it to the Greenspoint business district.

By 2001, Halliburton owned the tower in a joint venture with TrizecHahn. In August of that year, Halliburton announced that it would consolidate 8,000 local employees to office space in Westchase. Halliburton planned to vacate about 650,000 square feet (60,000 m^{2}) of Class B office space in the Kellogg Tower. In December 2001 Halliburton canceled its plans to relocate employees to Westchase. Nancy Sarnoff of the Houston Business Journal said that it made more sense for the company to lease existing space instead of constructing new office space in times of economic downturns.

In 2004, Jeanneret & Associates renewed its lease of 9,806 square feet (911.0 m^{2}) space in the KBR Tower for 10 years.

In 2009, at the KBR Tower, Brookfield Properties began offering office suites from 1,200 square feet (110 m^{2}) to 2,000 square feet (190 m^{2}) to small businesses and laid off individuals seeking to start their own businesses.

In 2010, KBR signed a 20-year lease for 1,200,000 square feet (110,000 m^{2}) at the KBR Tower and 500 Jefferson. In 2011 Brookfield Properties Corp. offered a 50% interest in the KBR Tower for sale. Paul Layne, Suresh Brookfield's Houston area executive vice president, said that the KBR lease made the building a major candidate for the sale of its interest. KBR owns the other 50% interest. Layne did not state whether KBR had the right of first refusal on Brookfield's interest. Layne said that confidentiality concerns were why he did not reveal the information.

In 2012 an affiliate of W.P. Carey purchased the KBR Tower.

== Gallery ==
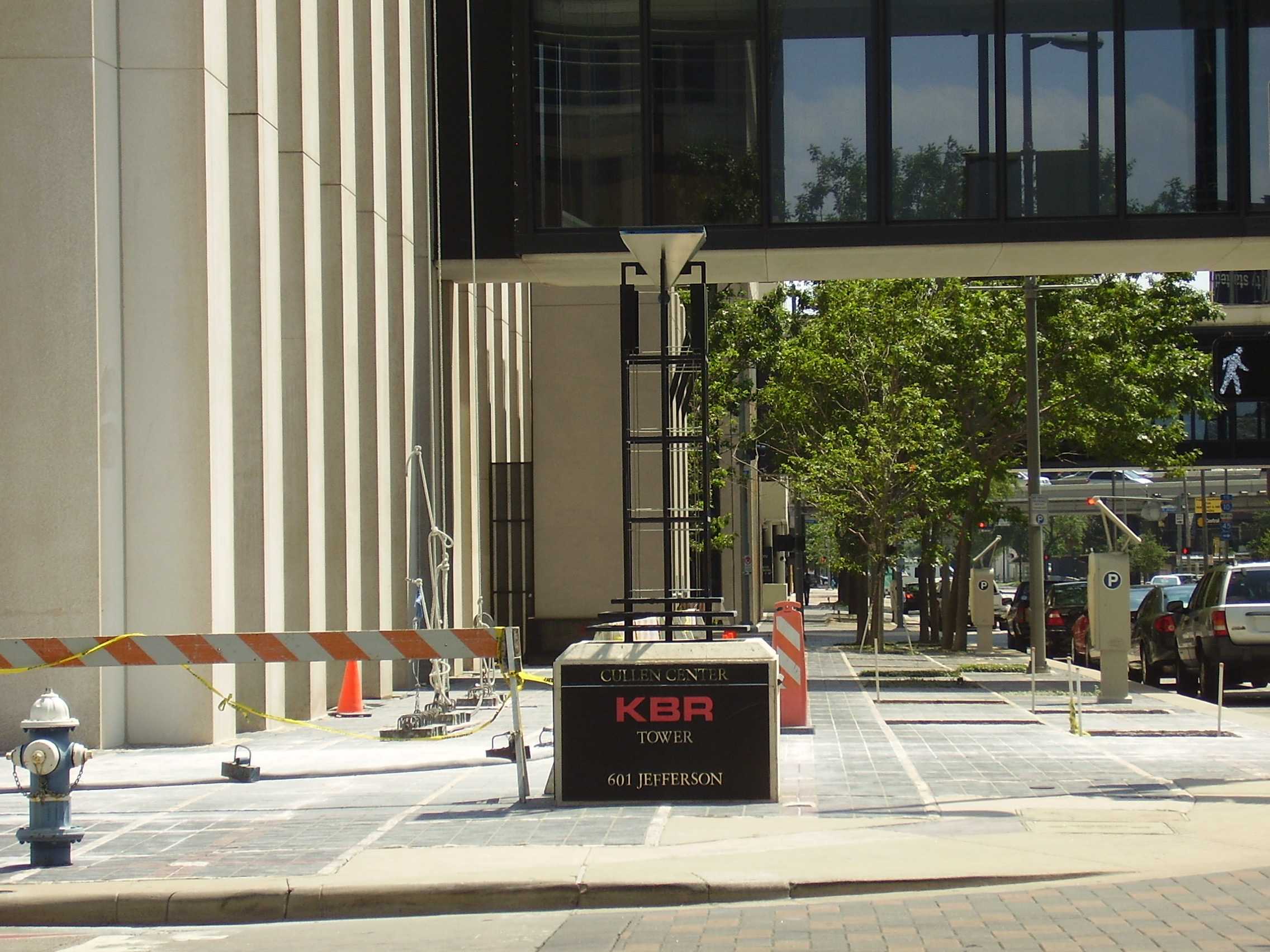
Base of the KBR Tower

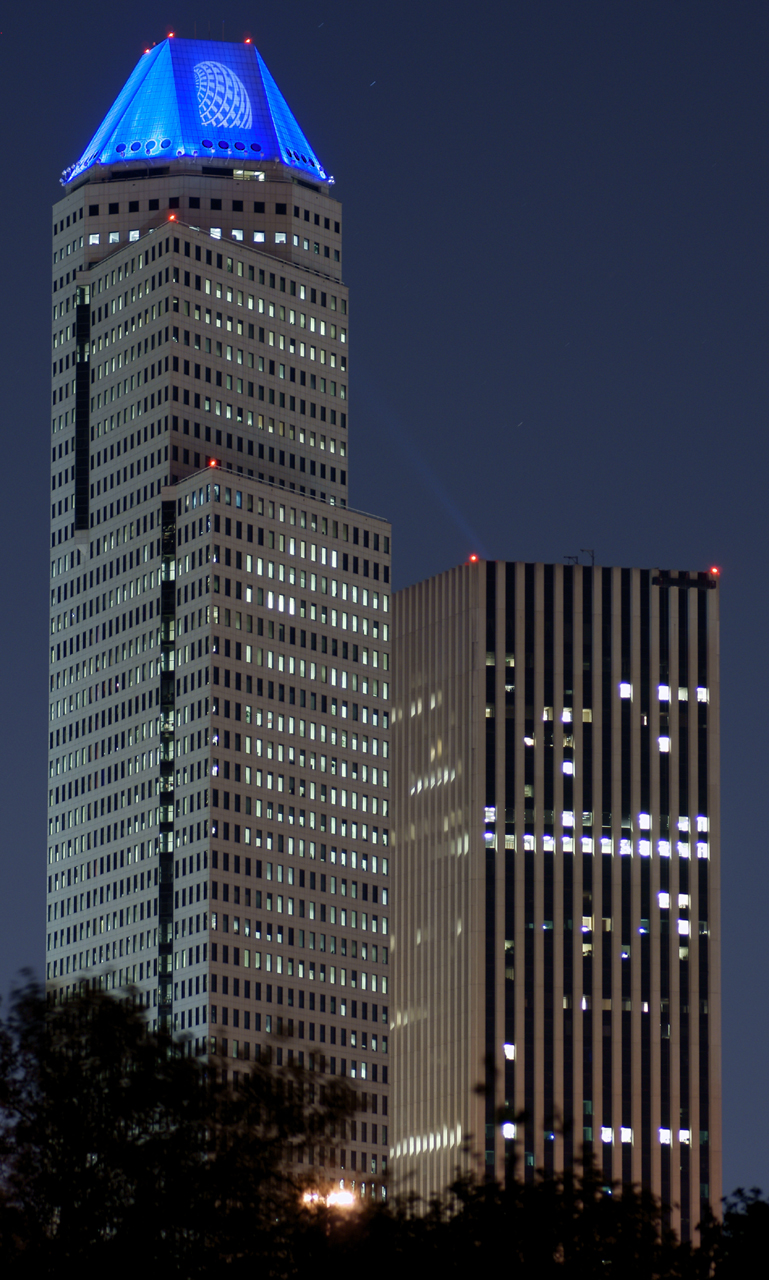
The KBR Tower at night, on the right, with the Continental Center I on the left

== See also ==
- List of tallest buildings in Houston
