= Houston Fire Department =

Fire department of Houston, Texas

Coordinates: 29°45′46″N 95°22′59″W

Operational area
- Country: United States
- State: Texas
- City: Houston
- Address: 500 Jefferson St, 77002

Agency overview
- Established: 1838
- Annual calls: 341,166 (2017)
- Employees: 3,700+ (2018)
- Annual budget: $495,171,980 (2018)
- Staffing: Career
- Fire chief: Thomas Muñoz
- EMS level: Advanced Life Support (ALS)
- IAFF: IAFF Local 341
- Motto: Courage, Commitment, & Compassion

Facilities and equipment
- Stations: 93
- Engines: 88
- Trucks: 38
- Rescues: 3
- Ambulances: 46 Advanced Life Support (ALS) Medic Units; 57 Basic Life Support (BLS) Units
- HAZMAT: 3
- Airport crash: 12
- Wildland: 11
- Helicopters: 1
- Fireboats: 1
- Rescue boats: 13
- Light and air: 3

Website
- Official website
- IAFF website

City of Houston Fire Department (HFD) is the agency that provides fire protection and emergency medical services for the city of Houston, Texas, United States, the fourth largest city in the United States. HFD is responsible for preserving life and property for a population of more than 2 million in an area totaling 654 square miles (1,690 km^{2}). The department is the largest fire department (by number of personnel) in the state of Texas.

The administrative offices of HFD are located on the 17th floor of 500 Jefferson Street (a part of the Cullen Center) in Downtown Houston. They were previously located at the City of Houston Fire Department Logistical Center & Maintenance Depot.

The Houston Fire Department got its start in 1838 with one station known as Protection Company No. 1. By 1859, the volunteer department had grown to three stations. After 57 years of service, Houston converted the department over to all paid members.

== Notable Incidents ==
=== Southwest Inn Fire ===
On May 31, 2013, the Southwest Inn fire broke out in an Indian restaurant in Southwest Houston before spreading to an adjoining hotel. The fire claimed the biggest casualty loss for the Houston Fire Department since its inception. Four firefighters were killed and 13 others were injured while fighting the five-alarm fire at the Southwest Inn. "Iron" Bill Dowling, who lost his legs and damaged his brain in the fire, died in Colorado on March 7, 2017, after a short hospitalization for pneumonia and cellulitis, attributed to his injuries.

=== 2016 Houston Fire ===
After the spreading of a backyard fire in Spring Branch, Houston, Texas, a packaging warehouse burned down during a four-alarm fire which included exploding canisters of hazardous material. Nearly 200 firefighters were dispatched to the site over several hours. As of May 2016, the initial cause of the fire remains unknown.

1979 Woodway Square Apartment Fire

Late in the afternoon of July 31, 1979, a call came in for an apartment fire at the Woodway Square Apartments in Houston. First units arriving immediately started calling for help as the high winds were fanning flames across the wood shingle roofs. Flames were jumping building to building and embers were entering the neighborhoods igniting roofs.

In all 7 alarms were called for which included equipment backed into Houston Fire stations from Cy-Fair, Little York and Northwest Volunteer Fire Departments.

Hundreds lost everything they owned. At one point it was discussed using explosives to demolish one building to make a fire break. As firefighters worked on controlling the apartment fire, booster trucks were tasked with driving through the neighborhoods extinguishing spot fires on roofs of homes.

On the day of the fire, the Houston Fire Department requested the city to ban wood shingles. They refused but the day after the fire they decided to ban them. In that day and age, most new homes had wood shingles and they were required by homeowners associations

== Stations and Apparatus ==
Below is a listing of all Houston Fire Department fire stations and their assigned apparatus.

Fire Station Number	Address	Engine Company	Ladder Company or Tower Company	Medic Units or Squad Units	Ambulance Units	Special Unit	District Chief Units	District
2	5880 Woodway	Engine 2			Ambulance 2	Cascade 2		28
3	3735 W. Alabama	Engine 3			Ambulance 503			28
4	6530 W. Little York	Engine 4	Ladder 4		Ambulance 4		District Chief 4	4
5	2020 Hollister	Engine 5			Ambulance 5	High-Water Vehicle 5	District Chief 5	5
6	3402 Washington	Engine 6	Tower 6	Medic 6			District Chief 6	6
7	1402 Elgin	Engine 7	Ladder 7		Ambulance 7			8
8	1919 Louisiana	Engine 1 Engine 8		Squad 8	Ambulance 8 Ambulance 508	Mobile Command Unit, AMBUS 602, Rehab Unit 8	District Chief 8	8
9	702 Hogan	Engine 9		Medic 9	Ambulance 9			19
10	6600 Corporate	Engine 10		Medic 10	Ambulance 10	Rescue 10, 2 Rescue Boats		83
11	460 T.C. Jester	Engine 11			Ambulance 11	Heavy Rescue 11, Evacuation Boat, 2 Rescue Boats, EMS District Chief Unit		6
12	1502 Alber	Engine 12			Ambulance 12			19
13	2215 W. 43rd	Engine 13			Ambulance 13			31
15	5306 N. Main	Engine 15			Ambulance 15	Shift Commander 15, Cascade 15, Sr. EMS Supervisor 15		6
16	1700 Richmond	Engine 16	Ladder 16		Ambulance 16	EMS Supervisor 16		6
17	2805 Navigation	Engine 17		Medic 17	Ambulance 17	Rehab 17, Rescue Boat, EMS Supervisor 17		8
18	619 Telephone	Engine 18	Tower 18	Medic 18	Ambulance 18			20
19	1801 Gregg	Engine 19	Ladder 19	Medic 19	Ambulance 19		District Chief 19	19
20	6902 Navigation	Engine 20	Ladder 20		Ambulance 20		District Chief 20	20
21	10515 Main	Engine 21	Tower 21		Ambulance 21	High-Water Vehicle 21	District Chief 21	21
22	7825 Harrisburg					HMRT Unit 1, HMRT Unit 2 Foam 22		22
23	8005 Lawndale	Engine 23			Ambulance 23	Cascade 23		20
24	2625 Reed Rd	Engine 24		Medic 24	Ambulance 524	Safety Officer 24		46
25	3902 Scott	Engine 25			Ambulance 25			8
26	7111 Dixie	Engine 26	Ladder 26		Ambulance 26		District Chief 26	26
27	6515 Lyons	Engine 27		Medic 27	Ambulance 27			19
28	3000 Chimney Rock	Engine 28	Ladder 28	Squad 28	Ambulance 28		District Chief 28	28
29	4831 Galveston	Engine 29	Ladder 29	Medic 29				26
30	6702 Irvington	Engine 30			Ambulance 30	Safety Officer 30, EMS Supervisor 30		31
31	222 W. Crosstimbers	Engine 31	Ladder 31	Medic 31	Ambulance 31		District Chief 31	31
32	8614 Tidwell	Engine 32			Ambulance 32	Booster 32, Evacuation Boat		34
33	7117 Fannin	Engine 33	Ladder 33	Squad 33	Ambulance 33 Ambulance 533	Sr. EMS Supervisor 33		21
34	3100 Laura Koppe	Engine 34	Ladder 34	Medic 34	Ambulance 34		District Chief 34	34
35	5535 Van Fleet	Engine 35			Ambulance 35	Booster 35, Evacuation Boat		46
36	7720 Airport Blvd	Engine 36		Medic 36	Ambulance 36	EMS Supervisor Unit 36		26
37	7026 Stella Link	Engine 37			Ambulance 37	Shift Commander, High-Water Vehicle 37		21
38	1120 Silber	Engine 38	Ladder 38		Ambulance 38			5
39	5810 Pickfair	Engine 39			Ambulance 39			34
40	5830 Old Spanish Trail	Engine 40		Medic 40	Ambulance 40			26
41	805 Pearl	Engine 41			Ambulance 41			45
42	8675 Clinton Dr	Engine 42				Rescue 42, Evacuation Boat, 2 Rescue Boats		20
43	7330 N. Wayside	Engine 43		Medic 43				34
44	675 Maxey	Engine 44	Ladder 44	Medic 44				45
45	4910 N. McCarty	Engine 45	Ladder 45			High-Water Vehicle 45	District Chief 45	45
46	3902 Corder	Engine 46	Ladder 46	Squad 46	Ambulance 46		District Chief 46	46
47	2615 Tidewater	Engine 47			Ambulance 47			59
48	11616 Chimney Rock	Engine 48			Ambulance 48			59
49	1212 Gessner	Engine 49		Medic 49				5
50	4420 Bingle	Engine 50		Medic 50		EMS Supervisor 50		4
51	6902 Bellaire	Engine 51	Ladder 51		Ambulance 51			68
52	10343 Hartsook	Engine 52			Ambulance 52			70
53	13349 Vicksburg	Engine 53						45
54	George Bush; Intercontinental Airport	AR-8				ARFF Units		ARFF
55	11212 Cullen	Engine 55	Ladder 55	Medic 55	Ambulance 55			46
56	5820 E. Little York	Engine 56	Ladder 56	Medic 56	Ambulance 56			34
57	13602 Memorial	Engine 57				Safety Officer 57		78
58	10413 Fulton	Engine 58		Medic 58	Ambulance 58	High-Water Vehicle 58		31
59	13925 S. Post Oak	Engine 59	Ladder 59	Medic 59			District Chief 59	59
60	2925 Jeanetta	Engine 60		Medic 60	Ambulance 60			28
61	9726 Monroe	Engine 61	Ladder 61					70
62	1602 Seamist	Engine 62		Medic 62				6
63	5626 Will Clayton Pkwy	Engine 63		Medic 63		Booster 63, Evacuation Boat		64
64	3000 Greens Rd	Engine 64	Tower 64		Ambulance 64		District Chief 64	64
65	11531 FM 1960 East	Engine 65		Medic 65		Booster 65, Fire Boat 65		102
66	5800 Teague	Engine 66				Booster 66, Evacuation Boat, HMRT Unit 3		4
67	1616 W. Little York	Engine 67	Ladder 67	Medic 67	Ambulance 67			4
68	8602 Bissonnet	Engine 68	Ladder 68		Ambulance 68		District Chief 68	68
69	1102 West Belt South	Engine 69	Tower 69		Ambulance 69	EMS Supervisor 69		83
70	11410 Beamer	Engine 70		Medic 70			District Chief 70	70
71	15200 Space Center	Engine 71	Ladder 71	Medic 71		High-Water Vehicle 71	District Chief 71	71
72	17401 Saturn Ln	Engine 72		Medic 72				71
73	9640 Wilcrest	Engine 73		Medic 73	Ambulance 73 Ambulance 573			68
74	460 Aldine Bender	Engine 74		Medic 74	Ambulance 74			64
75	1995 Dairy Ashford	Engine 75	Ladder 75	Medic 75				78
76	7200 Cook	Engine 76	Ladder 76		Ambulance 76			83
77	10155 Kempwood	Engine 77	Ladder 77		Ambulance 77	Booster 77, Rescue Boat		5
78	15100 Memorial	Engine 78	Ladder 78	Medic 78		High-Water Vehicle 78	District Chief 78	78
80	16111 Chimney Rock	Engine 80		Medic 80	Ambulance 80	Booster 80, Evacuation Boat		59
81	William P. Hobby Airport					ARFF Units		ARFF
82	11250 Braesridge	Engine 82		Squad 82	Ambulance 82	Evacuation Boat 82, EMS Supervisor 82		68
83	3350 Breezewood	Engine 83		Medic 83	Ambulance 83		District Chief 83	83
84	320 Gears Rd	Engine 84	Ladder 84		Ambulance 84	High-Water Vehicle 84		64
86	14300 Briar Forest	Engine 86		Medic 86				78
90	16553 Park Row	Engine 90	Ladder 90		Ambulance 90			78
92	George Bush; Intercontinental Airport					ARFF Units		ARFF
93	911 FM 1959	Engine 93	Ladder 93		Ambulance 93	Booster 93, Evacuation Boat		70
94	235 El Dorado	Engine 94		Medic 94				71
96	7409 Willowchase	Engine 96	Ladder 96	Medic 96				4
99	George Bush; Intercontinental Airport					ARFF Units		ARFF
101	1863 Kingwood Dr		Ladder 101	Medic 101		Booster 101, Evacuation Boat		102
102	4102 W. Lake Houston Pkwy	Engine 102	Ladder 102	Medic 102		High-Water Vehicle 102	District Chief 102	102
103	2907 High Valley Dr	Engine 103				Booster 103, Evacuation Boat		102
104	910 Forest Cove Dr	Engine 104						102
105	14014 W. Lake Houston Pkwy	Engine 105		Medic 105				102

In 2018 there was a post-Hurricane Harvey plan to replace fire station 104 for $11 million.

== Gallery ==
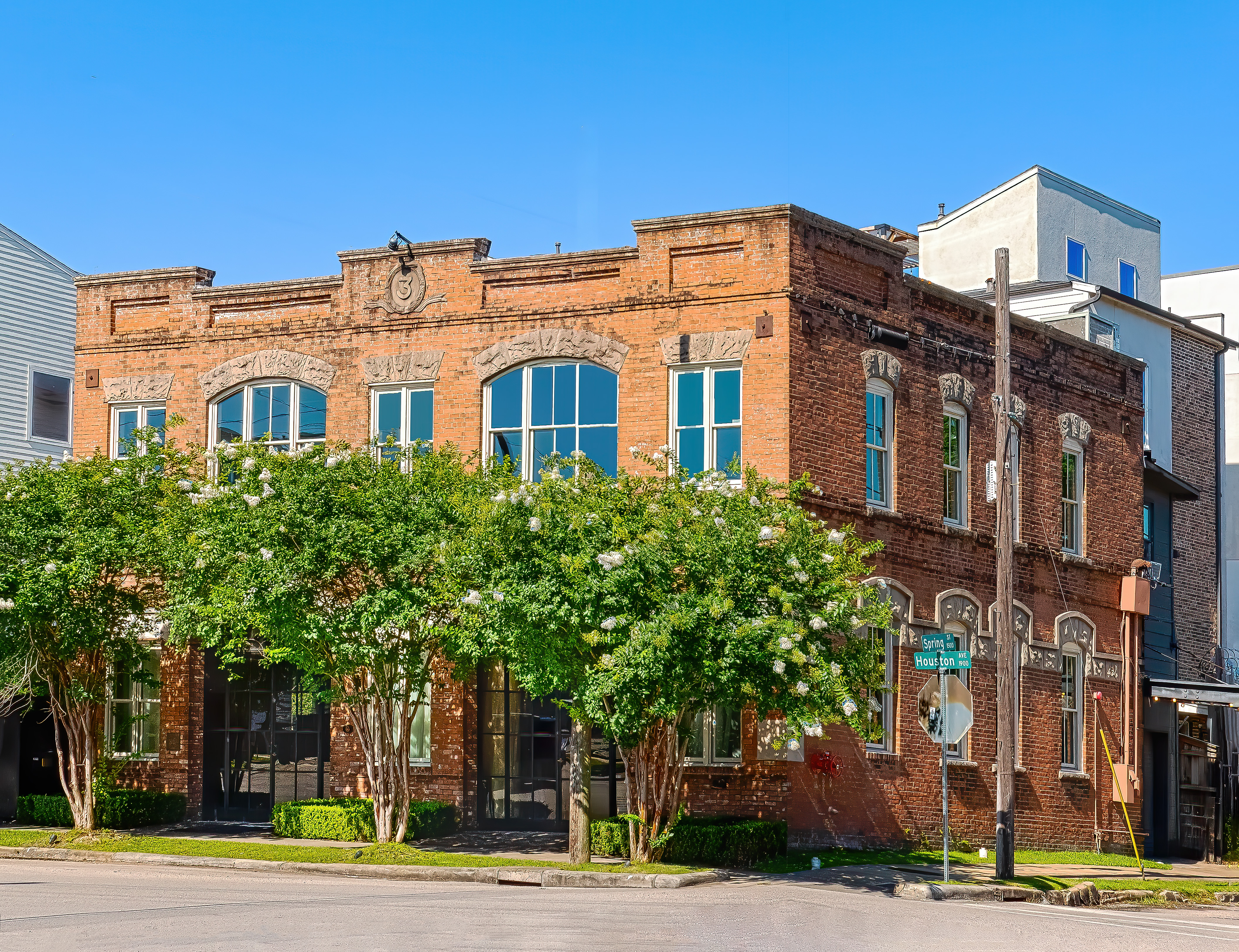
Houston Fire Station Nr. 3 from the 1800s. It's on the National Register of Historic Places

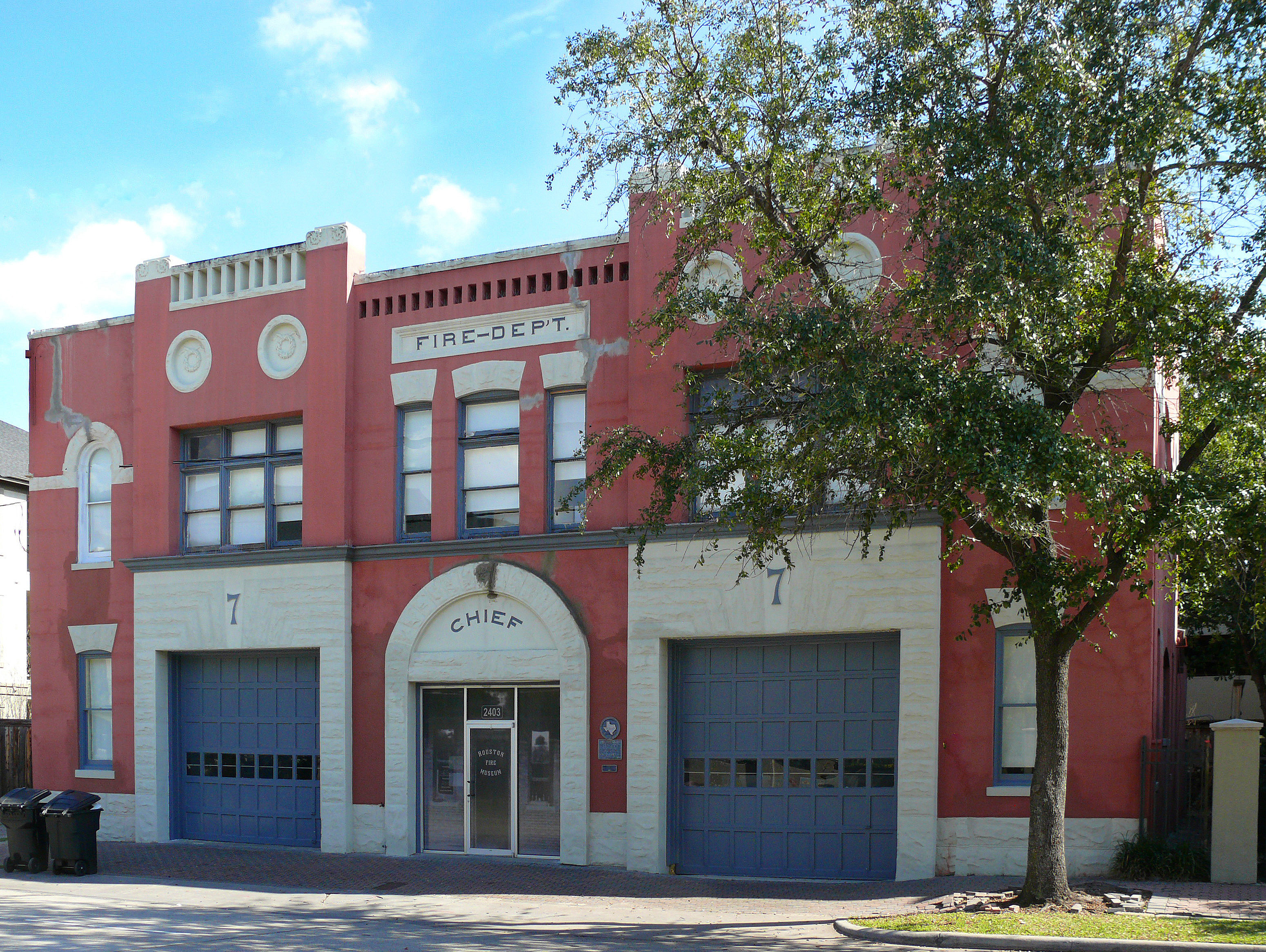
Houston Fire Station No. 7 was built in 1898. Today it's the Houston Fire Museum & on the National Register of Historic Places

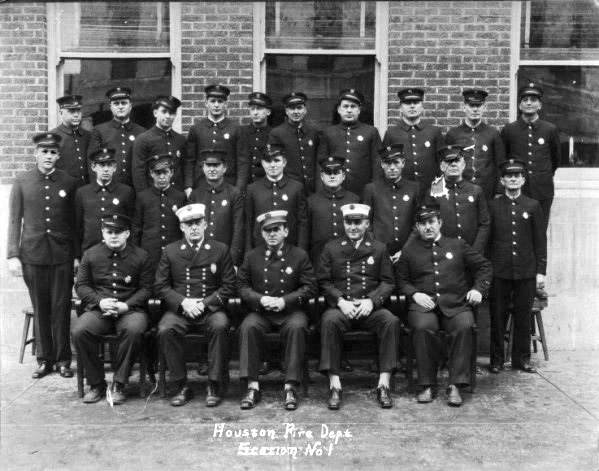
Group photo of firefighters from Station 1–1932

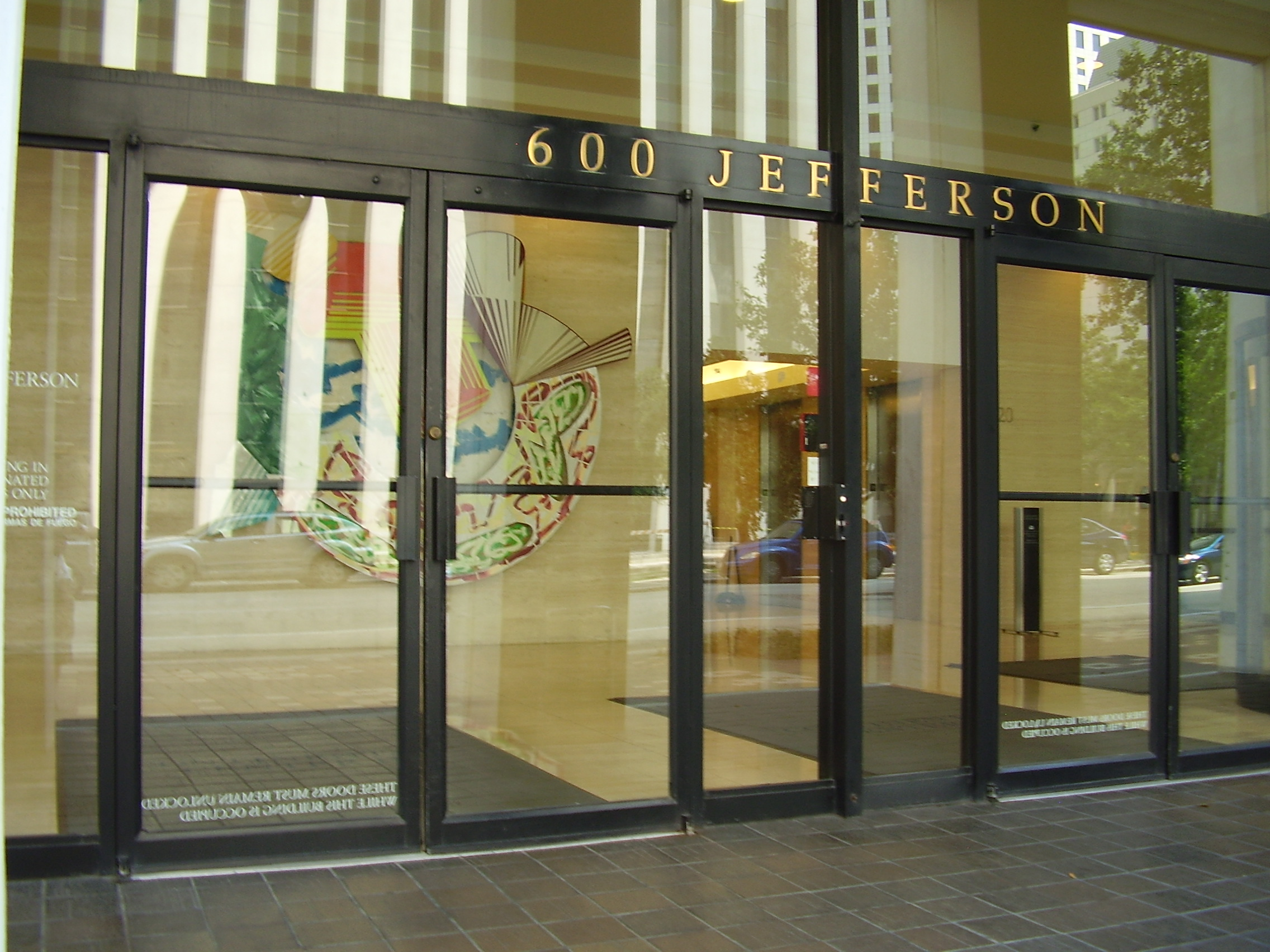
Continental Center II (1801 Smith) of the Cullen Center houses the HFD administrative offices

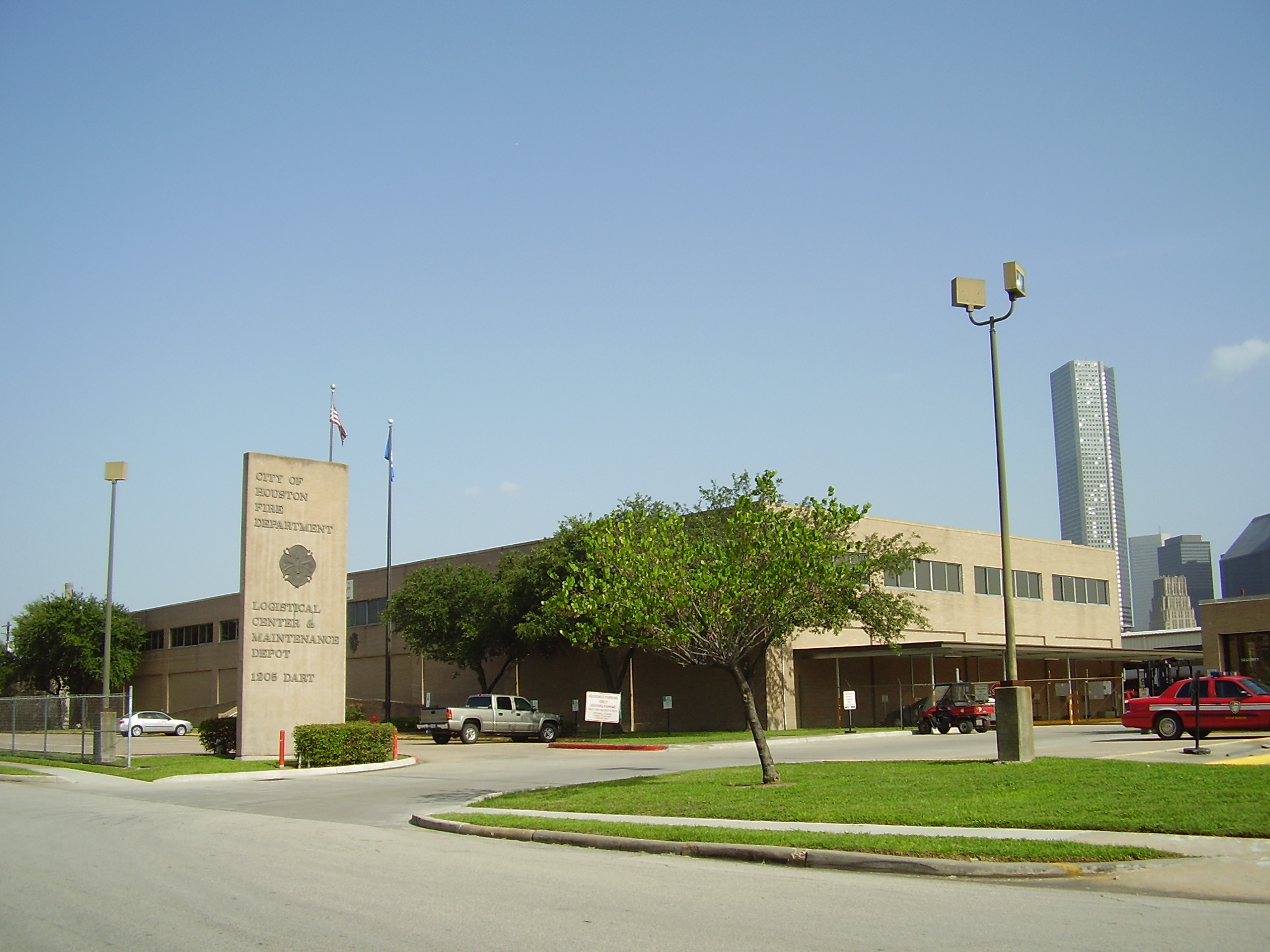
City of Houston Fire Department Logistical Center & Maintenance Depot

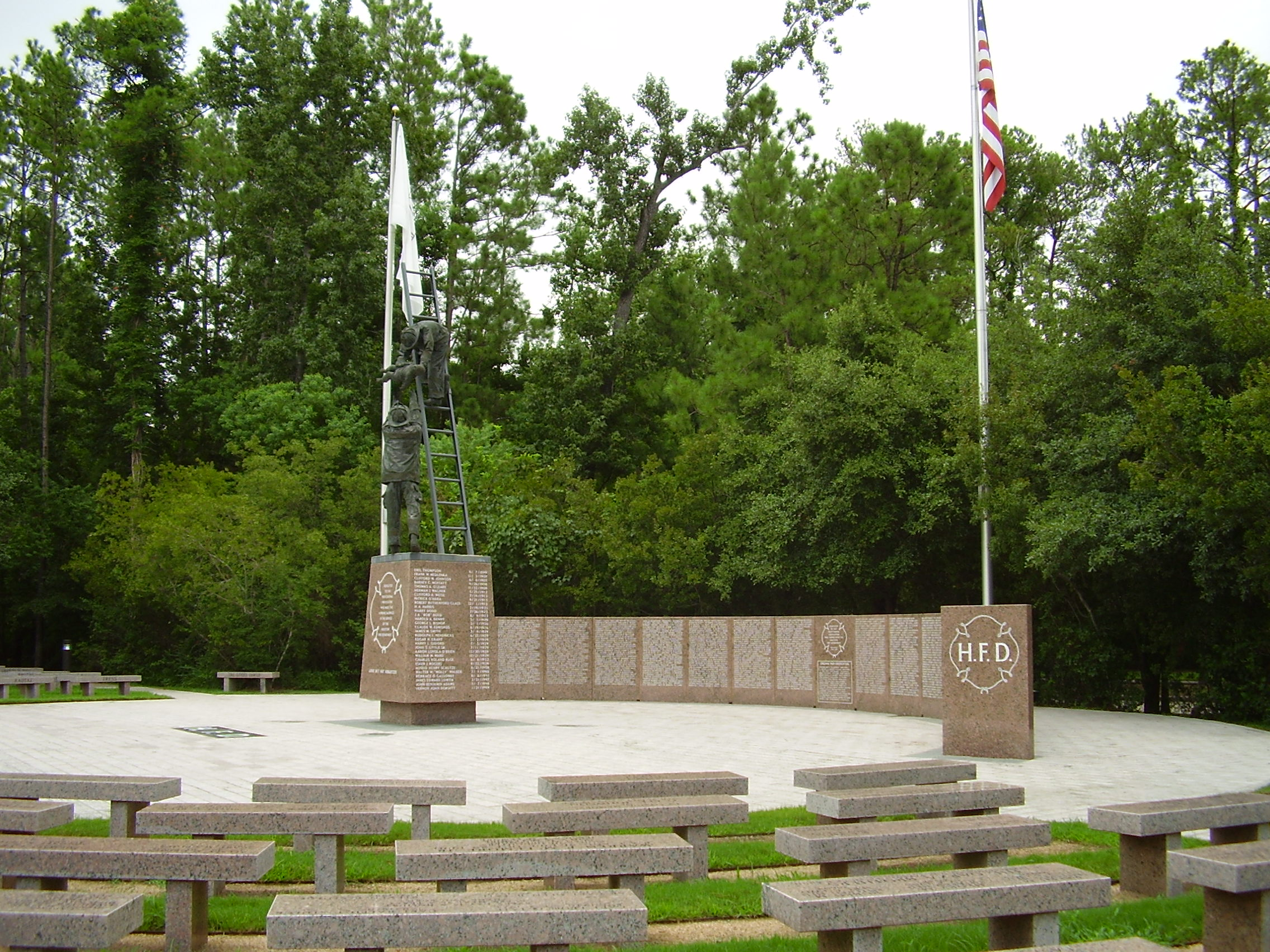
HFD Firefighters' Memorial in northern Houston

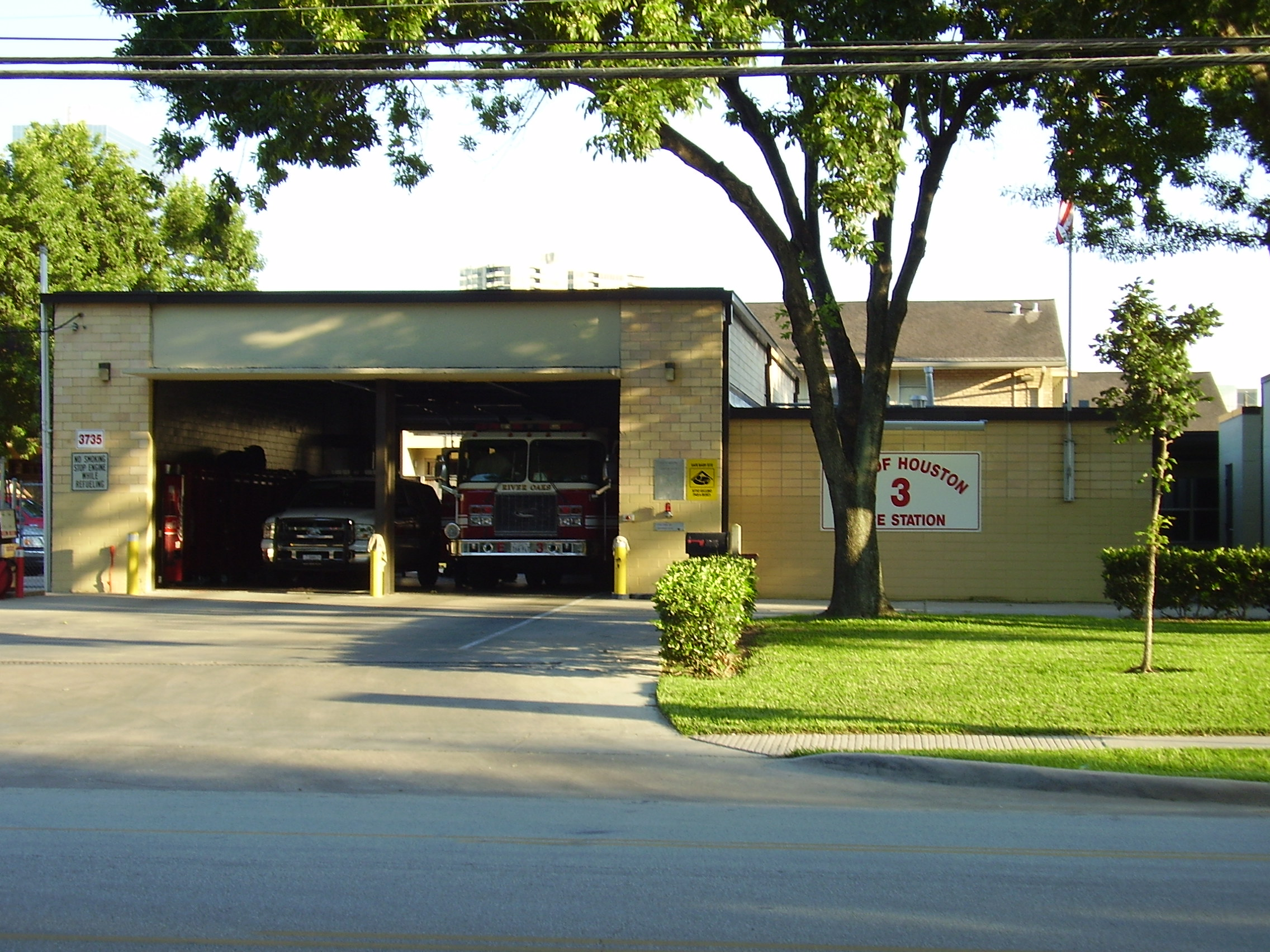
Fire Station 3

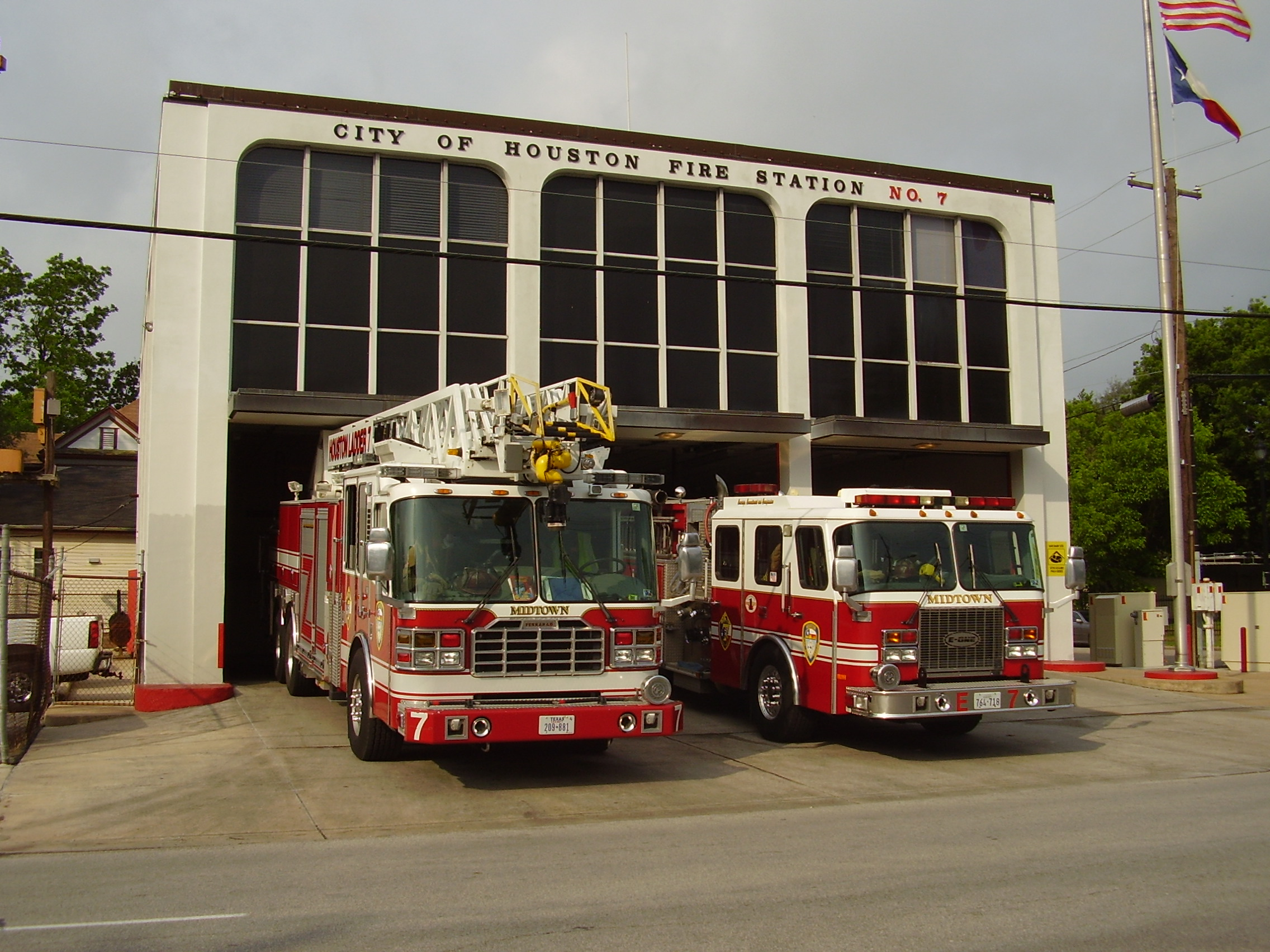
Fire Station 7

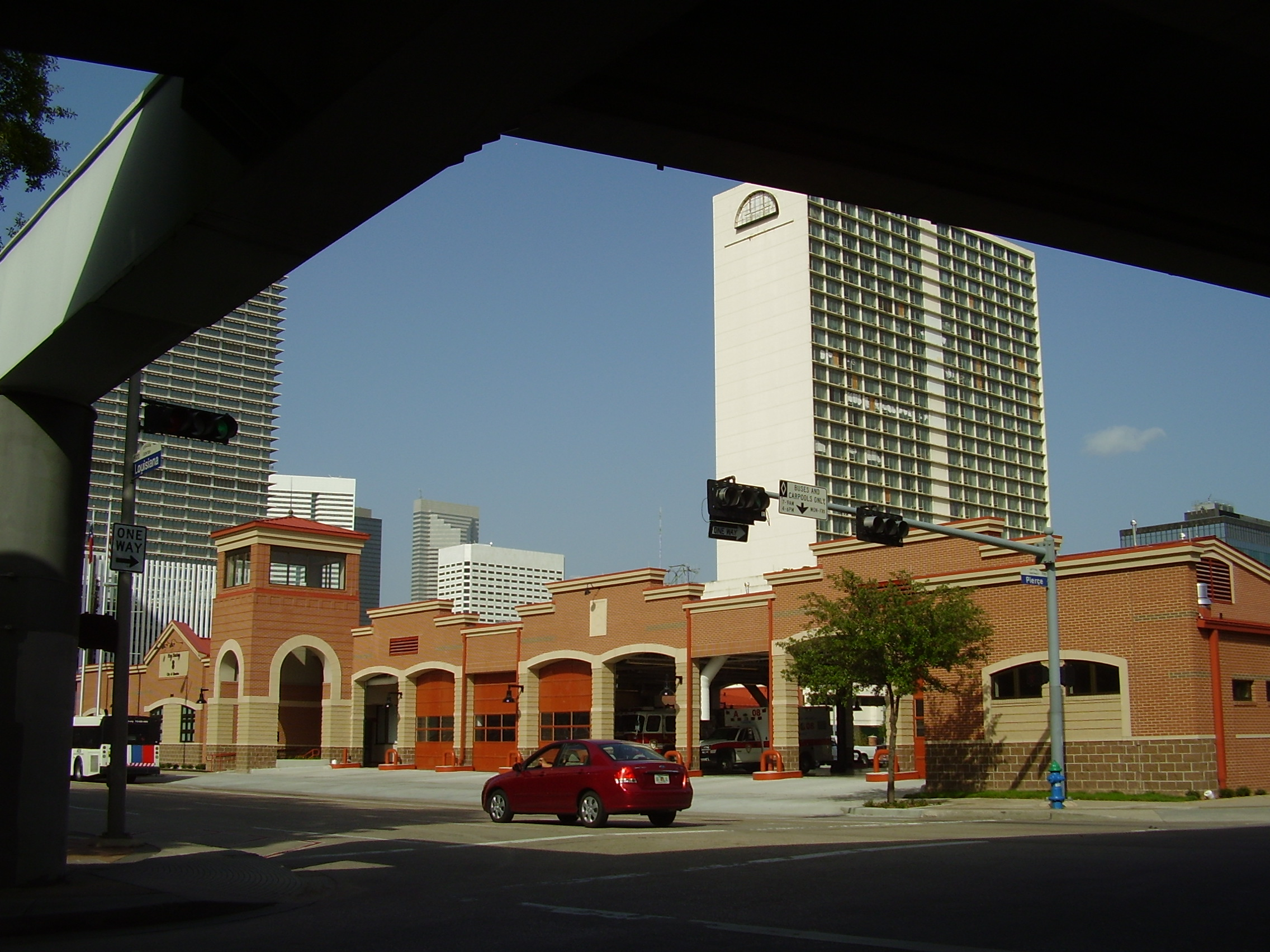
Fire Station 8

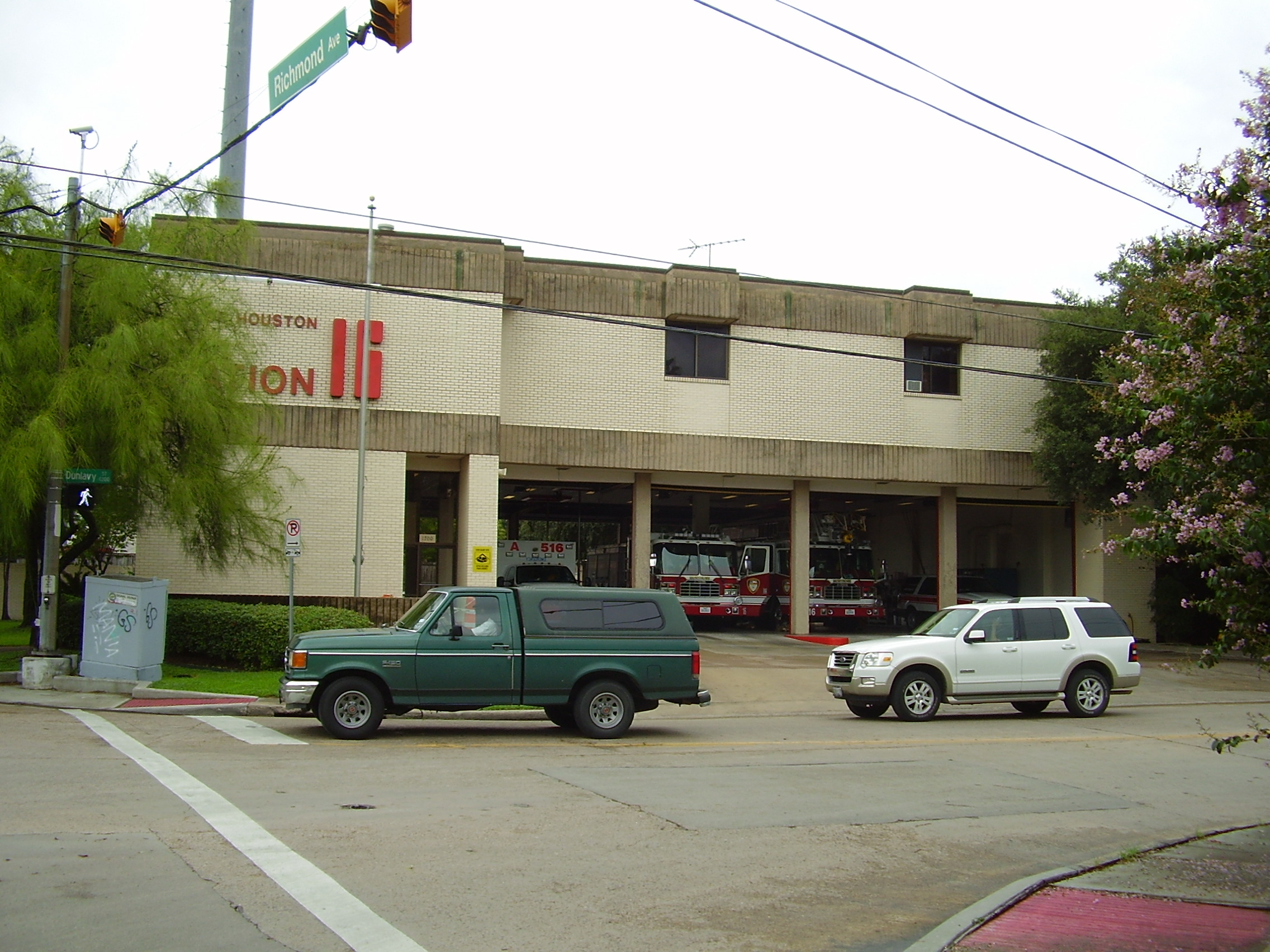
Fire Station 16

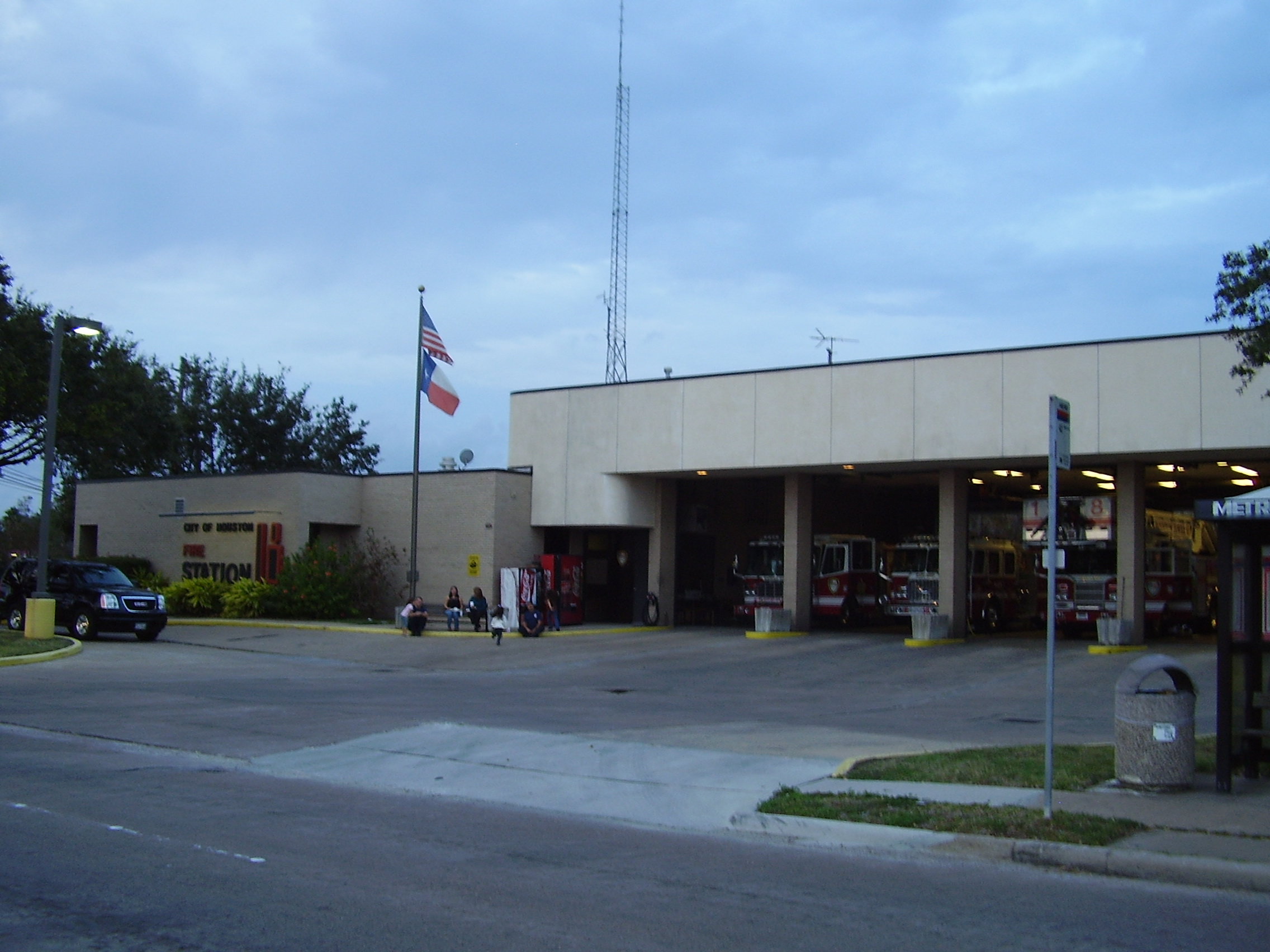
Fire Station 18

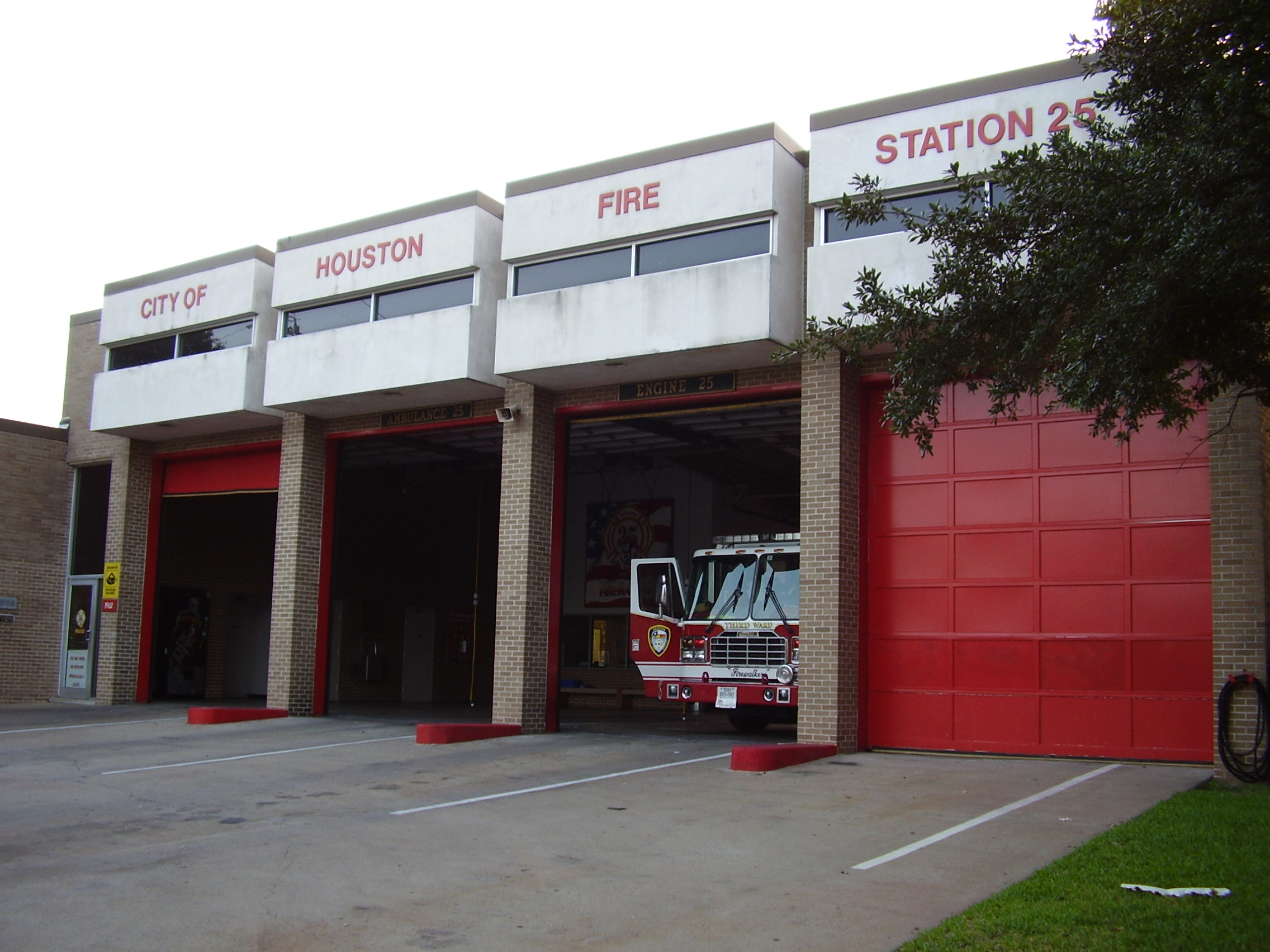
Fire Station 25

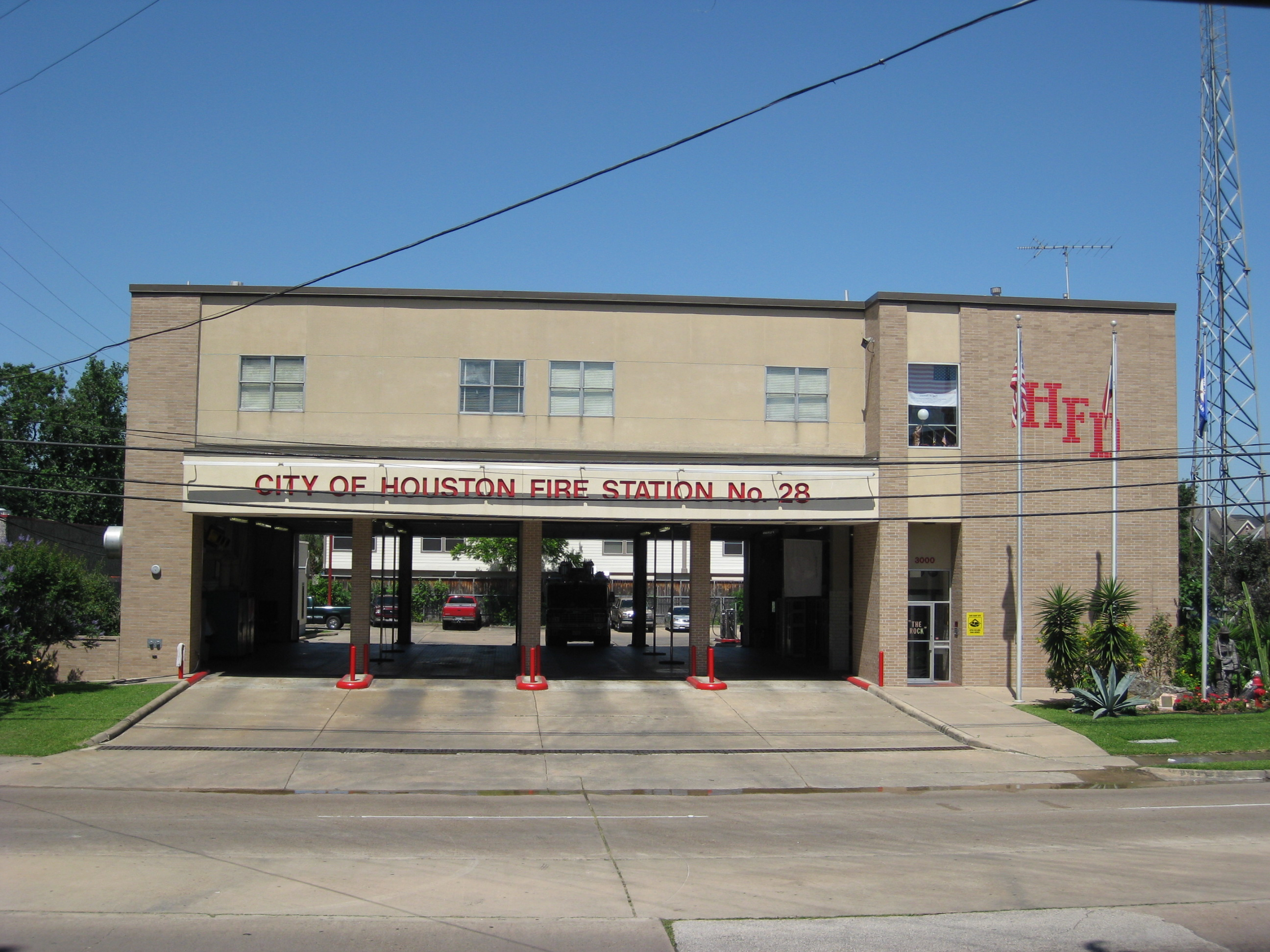
Fire Station 28 at 3000 Chimney Rock

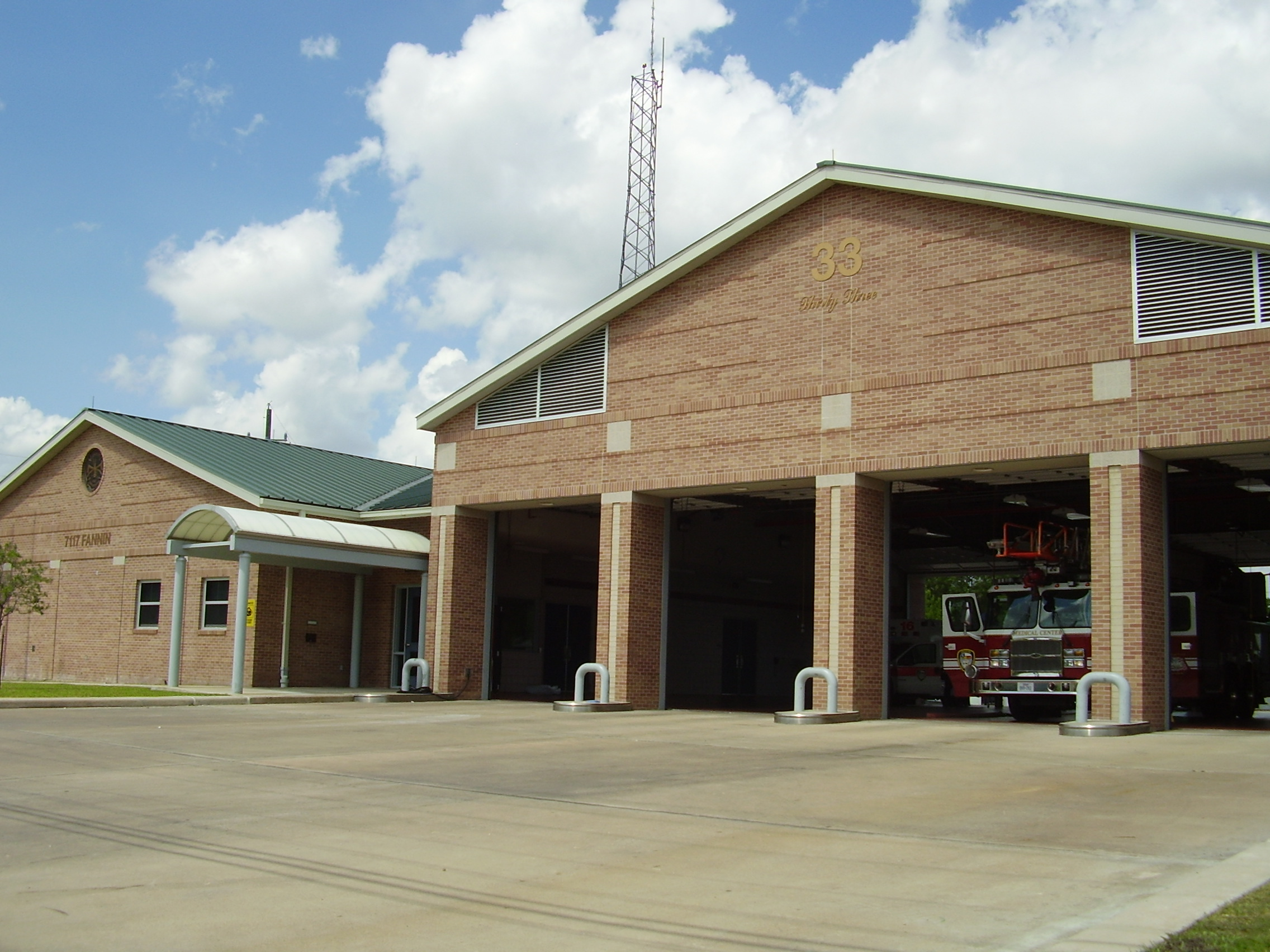
Fire Station 33

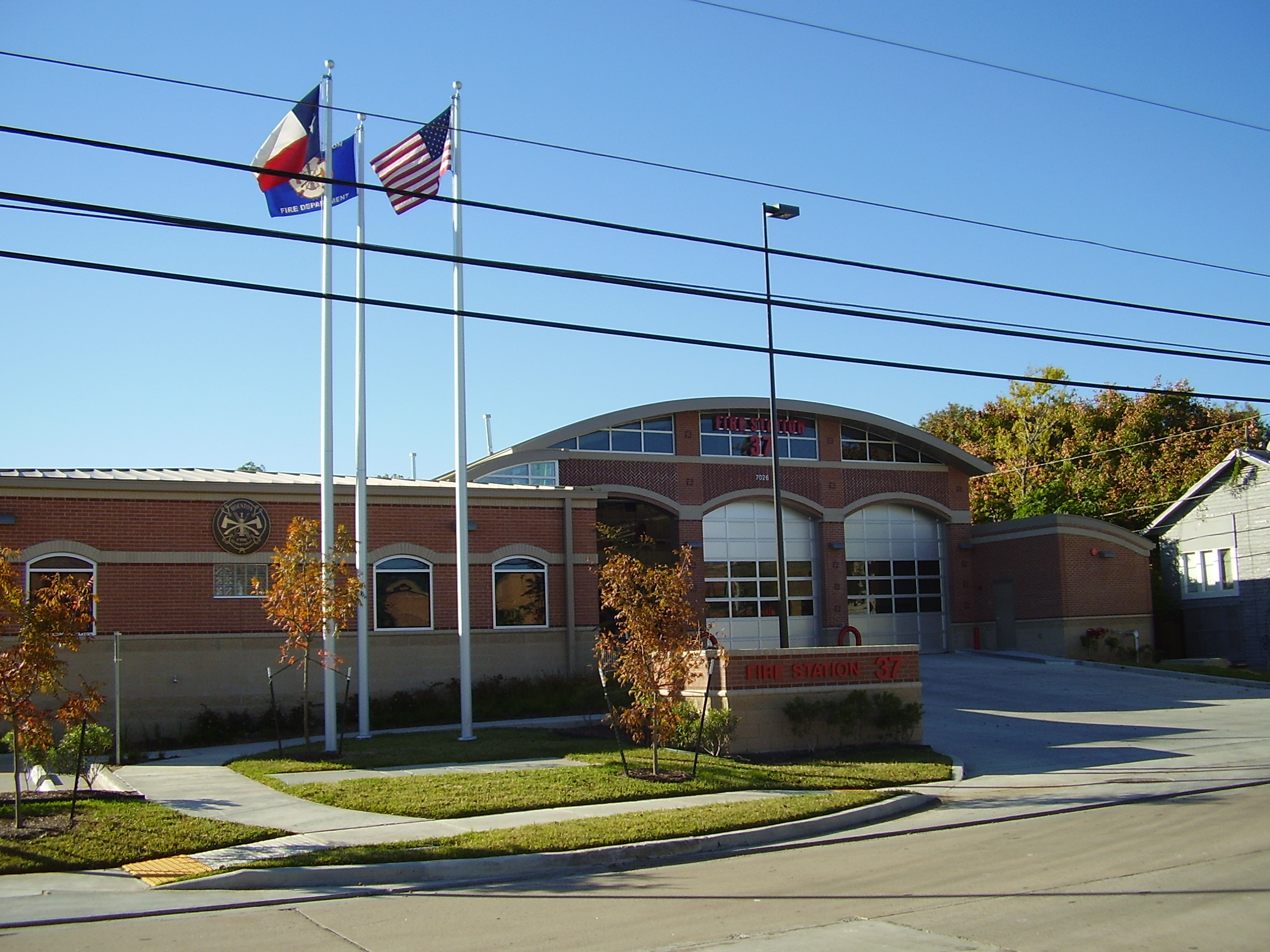
Braeswood Place
