= USS LST-487 =

1943 LST-1-class tank landing ship

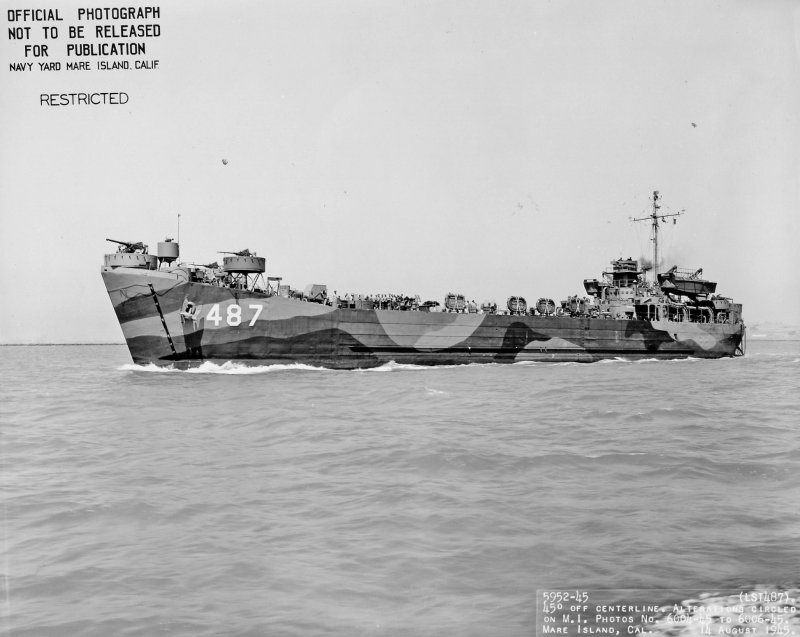
- Forward port quarter view of USS LST-487, off Mare Island, 14 August 1945.

History

United States
- Name: LST-487
- Ordered: as a Type S3-M-K2 hull, MCE hull 1007
- Builder: Permanente Metals Corporation, Richmond, California
- Yard number: 42
- Laid down: 2 January 1943
- Launched: 23 January 1943
- Commissioned: 27 April 1943
- Decommissioned: 15 March 1946
- Identification: Hull symbol: LST-487; Code letters: NGYQ
- Honors and awards: 5 × battle stars
- Fate: Sold for merchant service conversion, 20 February 1948

General characteristics
- Class & type: LST-1-class tank landing ship
- Displacement: 4,080 long tons (4,145 t) full load; 2,160 long tons (2,190 t) landing
- Length: 328 ft (100 m) oa
- Beam: 50 ft (15 m)
- Draft: Full load: 8 ft 2 in (2.49 m) forward; 14 ft 1 in (4.29 m) aft; Landing at 2,160 t: 3 ft 11 in (1.19 m) forward; 9 ft 10 in (3.00 m) aft
- Installed power: 2 × 900 hp (670 kW) Electro-Motive Diesel 12-567A diesel engines; 1,700 shp (1,300 kW)
- Propulsion: 1 × Falk main reduction gears; 2 × Propellers
- Speed: 12 kn (22 km/h; 14 mph)
- Range: 24,000 nmi (44,000 km; 28,000 mi) at 9 kn (17 km/h; 10 mph) while displacing 3,960 long tons (4,024 t)
- Boats & landing craft carried: 2 or 6 x LCVPs
- Capacity: 2,100 tons oceangoing maximum; 350 tons main deckload
- Troops: 16 officers, 147 enlisted men
- Complement: 13 officers, 104 enlisted men
- Armament: Varied, ultimate armament; 2 × twin 40 mm (1.57 in) Bofors guns; 4 × single 40 mm Bofors guns; 12 × 20 mm (0.79 in) Oerlikon cannons

Service record
- Part of: LST Flotilla 5 (1943–1944); LST Flotilla 13 (1945)
- Operations: Capture and occupation of Saipan (15 June–30 July 1944); Tinian Capture and occupation (24–30 July 1944); Capture and occupation of southern Palau Islands (6 September–14 October 1944); Lingayen Gulf landings (4–15 January 1945); Assault and occupation of Okinawa Gunto (2–9 April 1945)
- Awards: American Campaign Medal; Asiatic–Pacific Campaign Medal; World War II Victory Medal; Navy Occupation Service Medal w/Asia Clasp; Philippine Republic Presidential Unit Citation; Philippine Liberation Medal

USS LST-487 was an LST-1-class tank landing ship built for the United States Navy during World War II.

== Construction ==
LST-487 was laid down on 2 January 1943, under Maritime Commission (MARCOM) contract, MC hull 1007, by Kaiser Shipyards, Yard No. 4, Richmond, California; launched on 23 January 1943; and commissioned on 27 April 1943,

== Service history ==
During World War II, LST 487 was assigned to the Asian/Pacific theater and participated in the following operations: the Capture and occupation of Saipan in June and July 1944; the Tinian capture and occupation in July 1944; the Capture and occupation of southern Palau Island in September and October 1944; the Lingayen Gulf landing in January 1945; and the Assault and occupation of Okinawa Gunto in May 1945.

=== Battle of Saipan ===
At Saipan, she discharged vehicles and personnel for the attacking waves against the beach "Yellow Two". While on station, she received casualties from the beaches for treatment or burial. She suffered air attacks on 17 and 24 June, in which she was undamaged.

=== Battle of Tinian ===
At Tinian, she discharged LVTs and troops to the beaches of Tinian. She remained on the beach throughout the day of 25 July, performing recovery operations.

== Post-war service ==
Following the war, LST-487 performed occupation duty in the Far East from 15 October, until 3 November 1945. Upon her return to the United States, she was decommissioned on 15 March 1946, and struck from the Navy list on 1 May 1946. On 20 February 1948, the ship was sold to Brown & Root, of Houston, Texas, for merchant service.

== Awards ==
LST-487 earned five battle stars for World War II service.

== Gallery ==
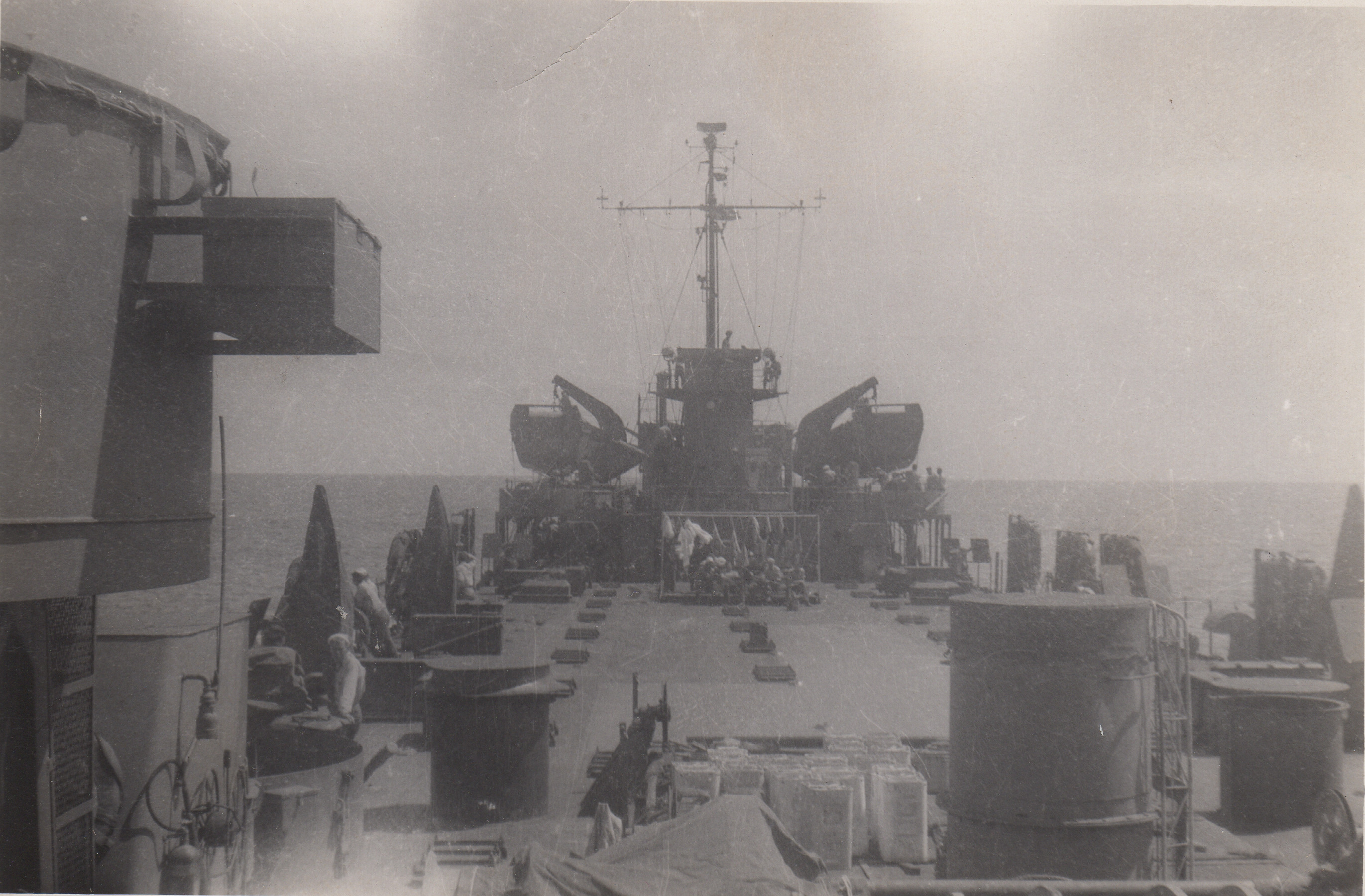
LST-487 Looking aft

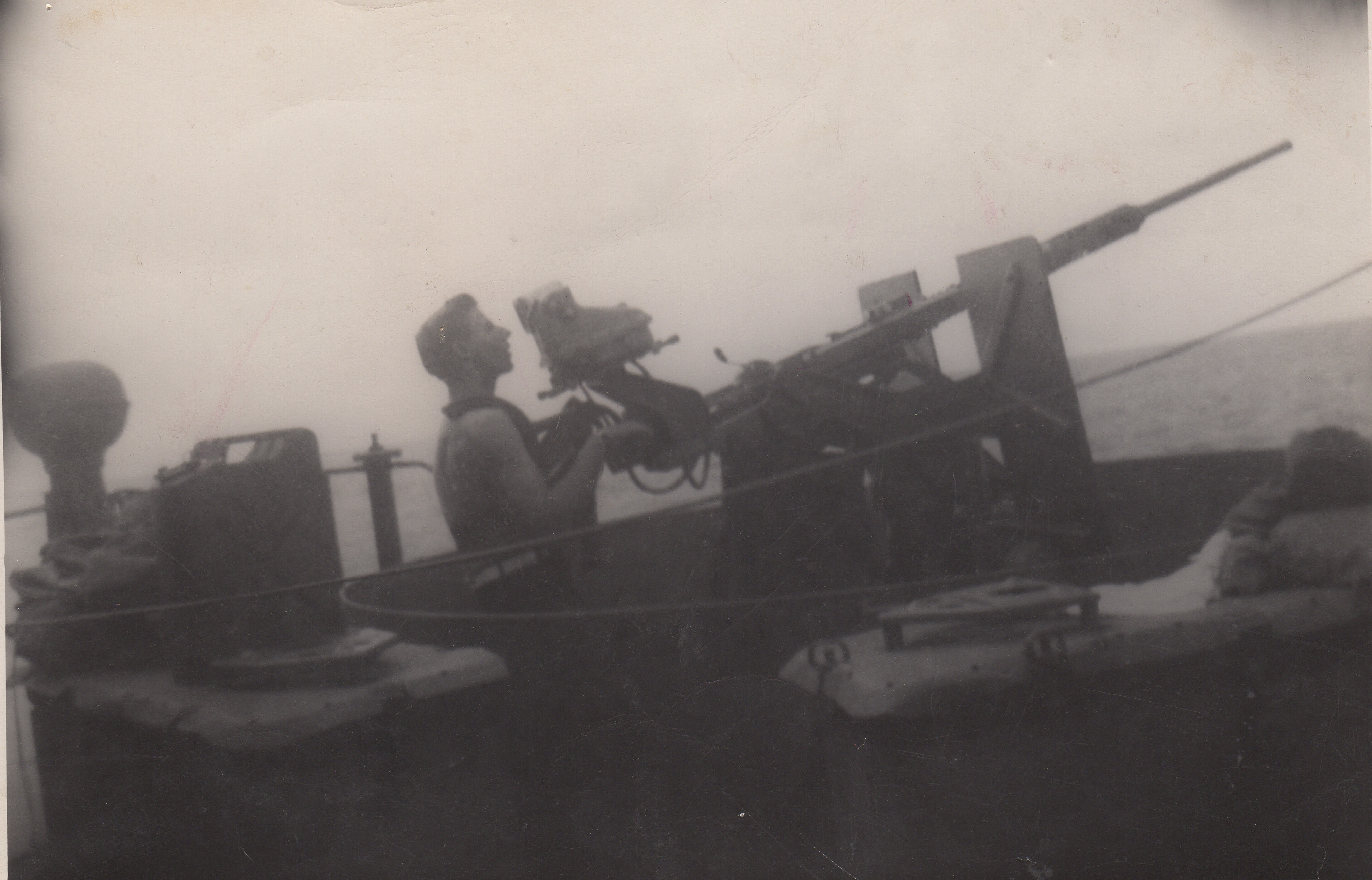
Manning the 20mm on LST-487

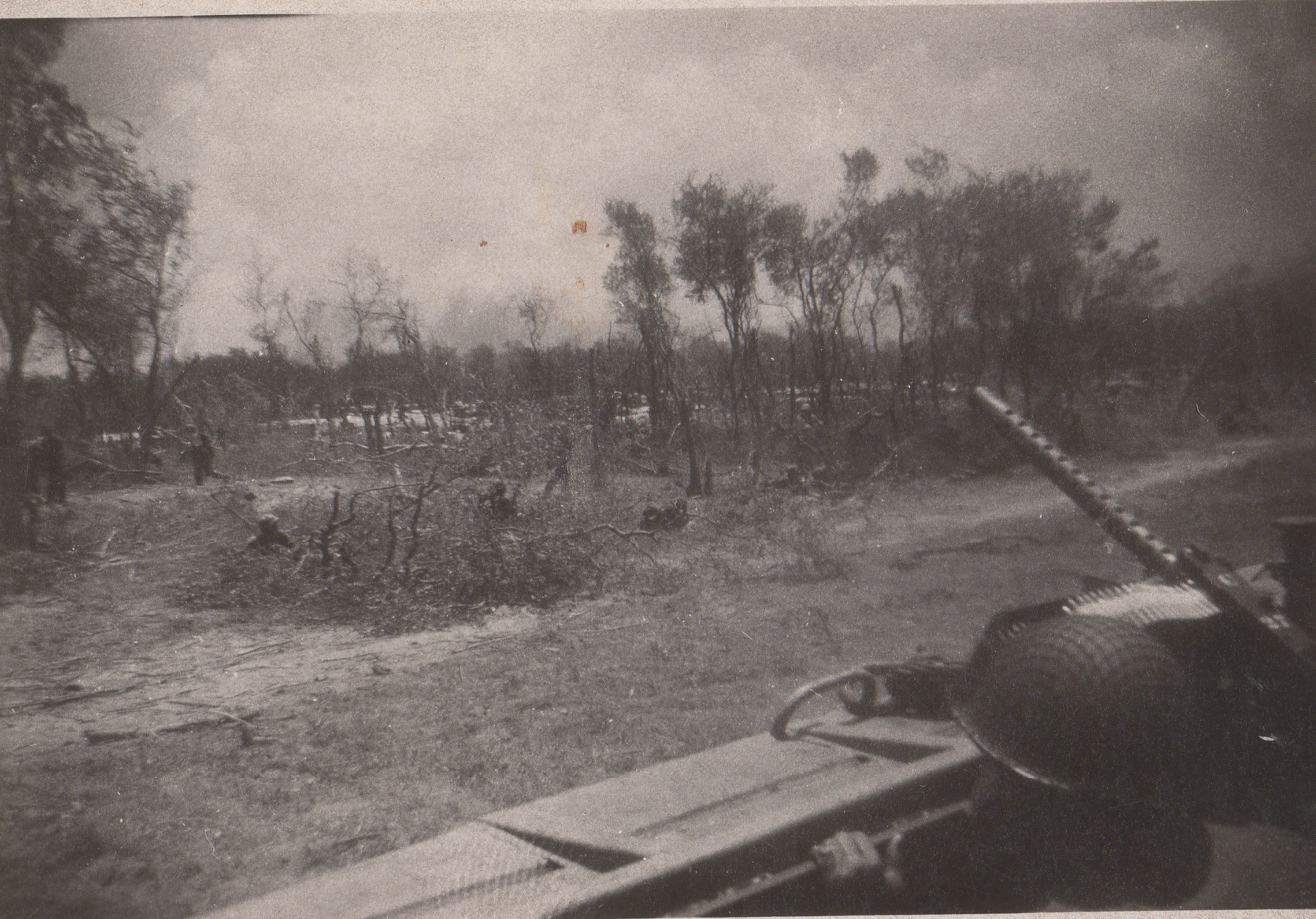
Image from a landing craft of LS-487 during the invasion of Saipan

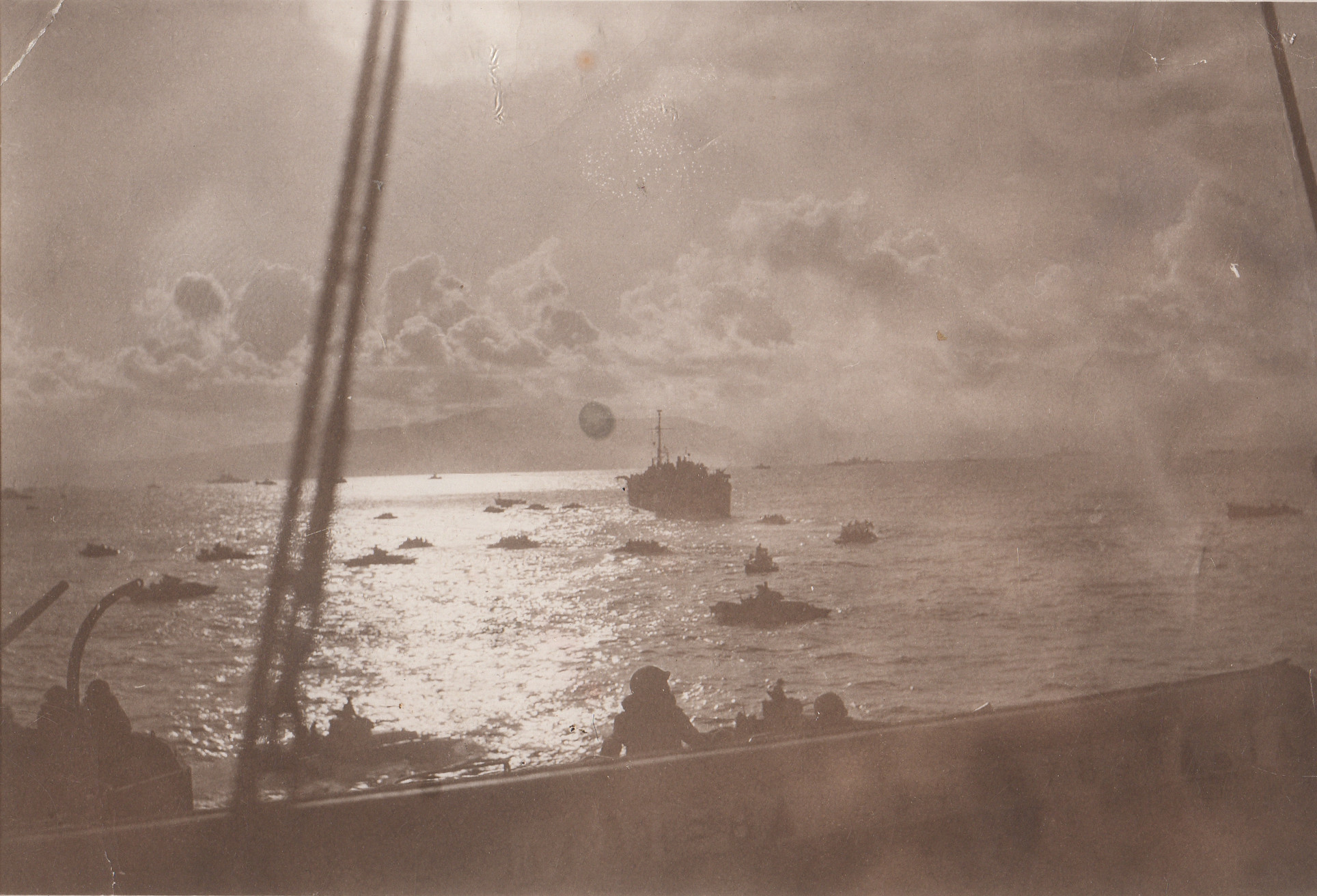
Landing craft from LST-487 launched during the Invasion of Saipan. The island is covered in smoke from shelling

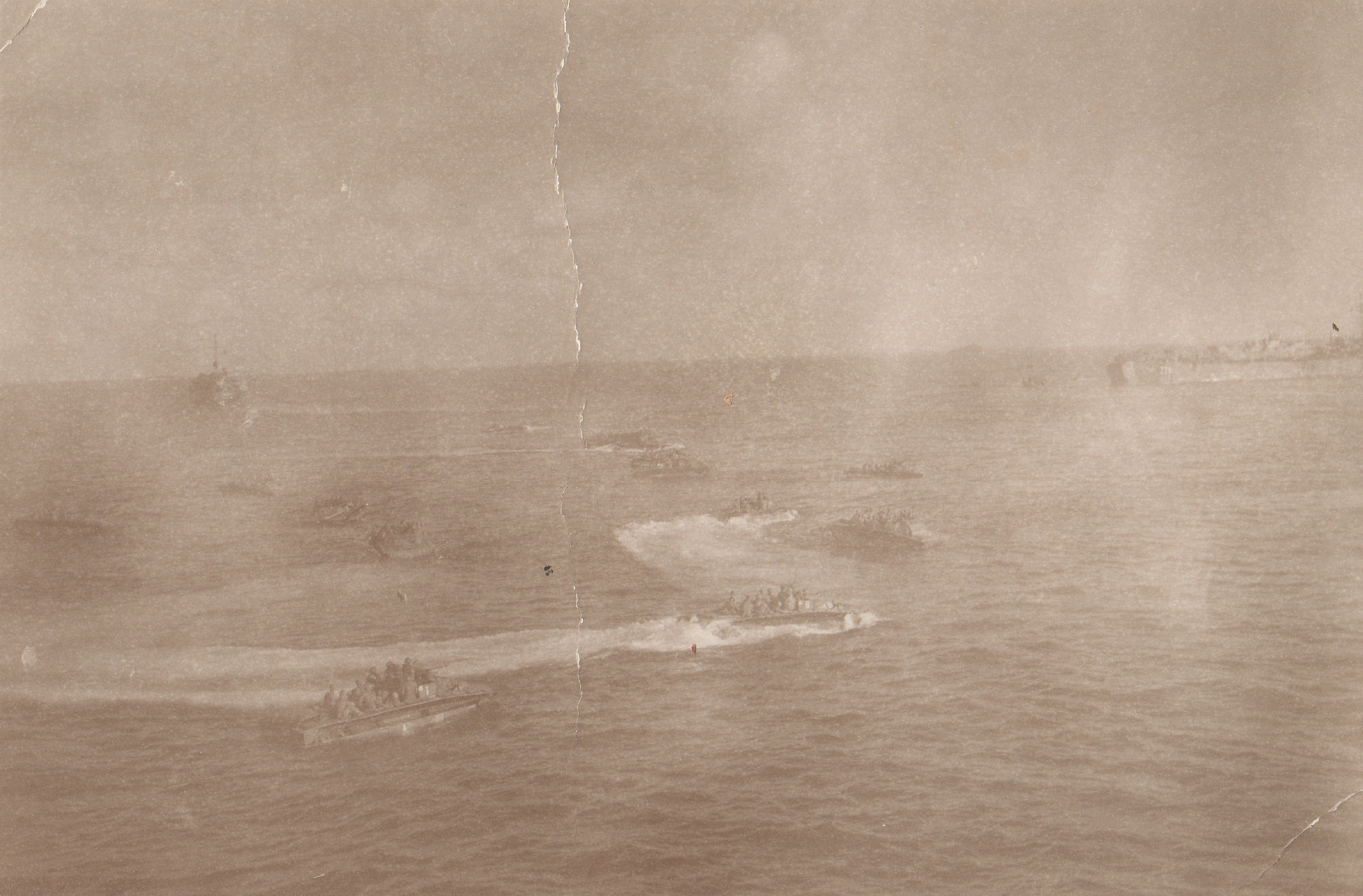
Landing craft from LST-487 launched during the invasion of Saipan

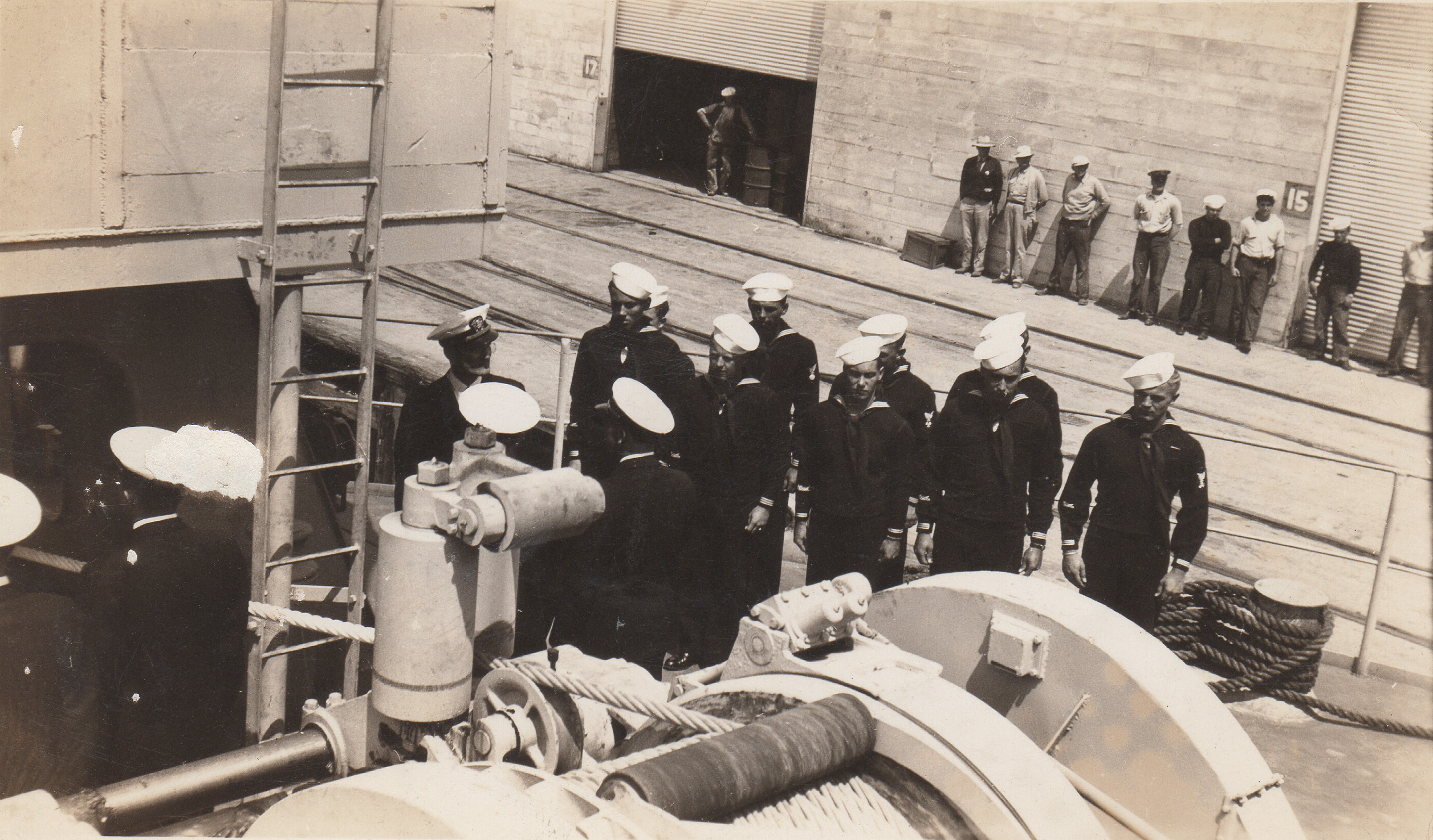
LST-487 on commissioning day in Richmond CA

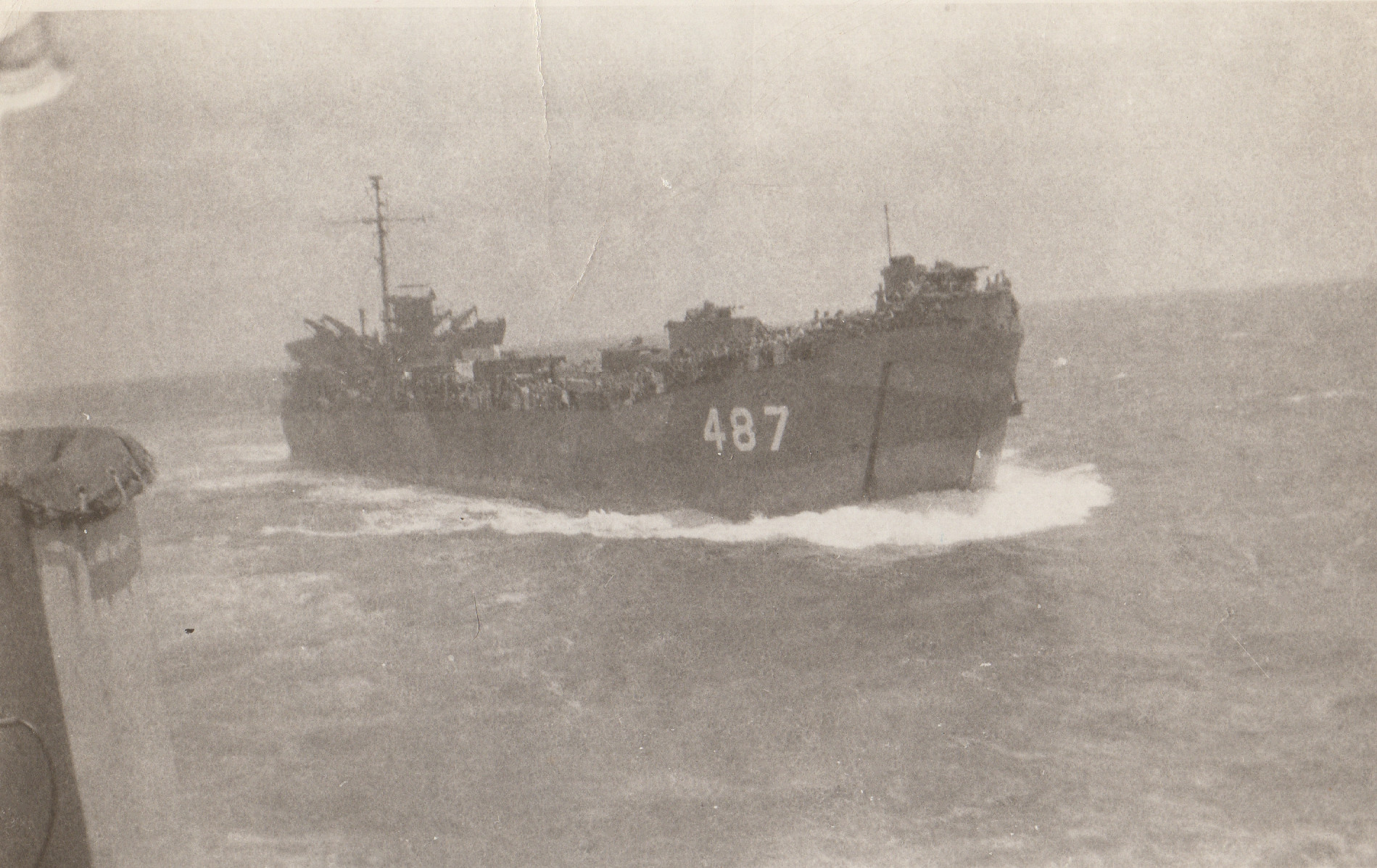
LST-487 pulling up alongside 564 at sea to exchange movies and records. Taken from 564.

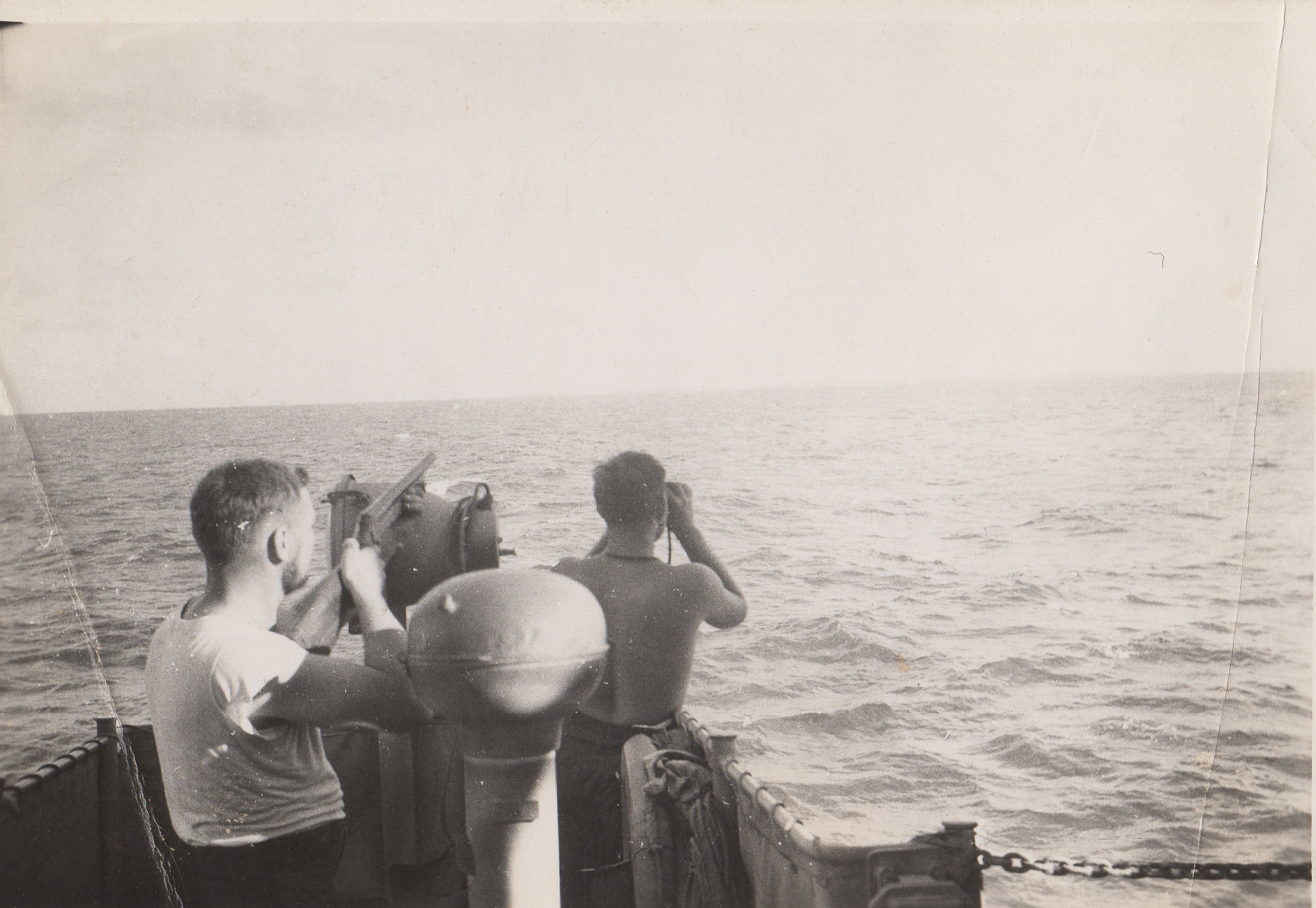
LST-487 crew searching for a Japanese pilot in the water

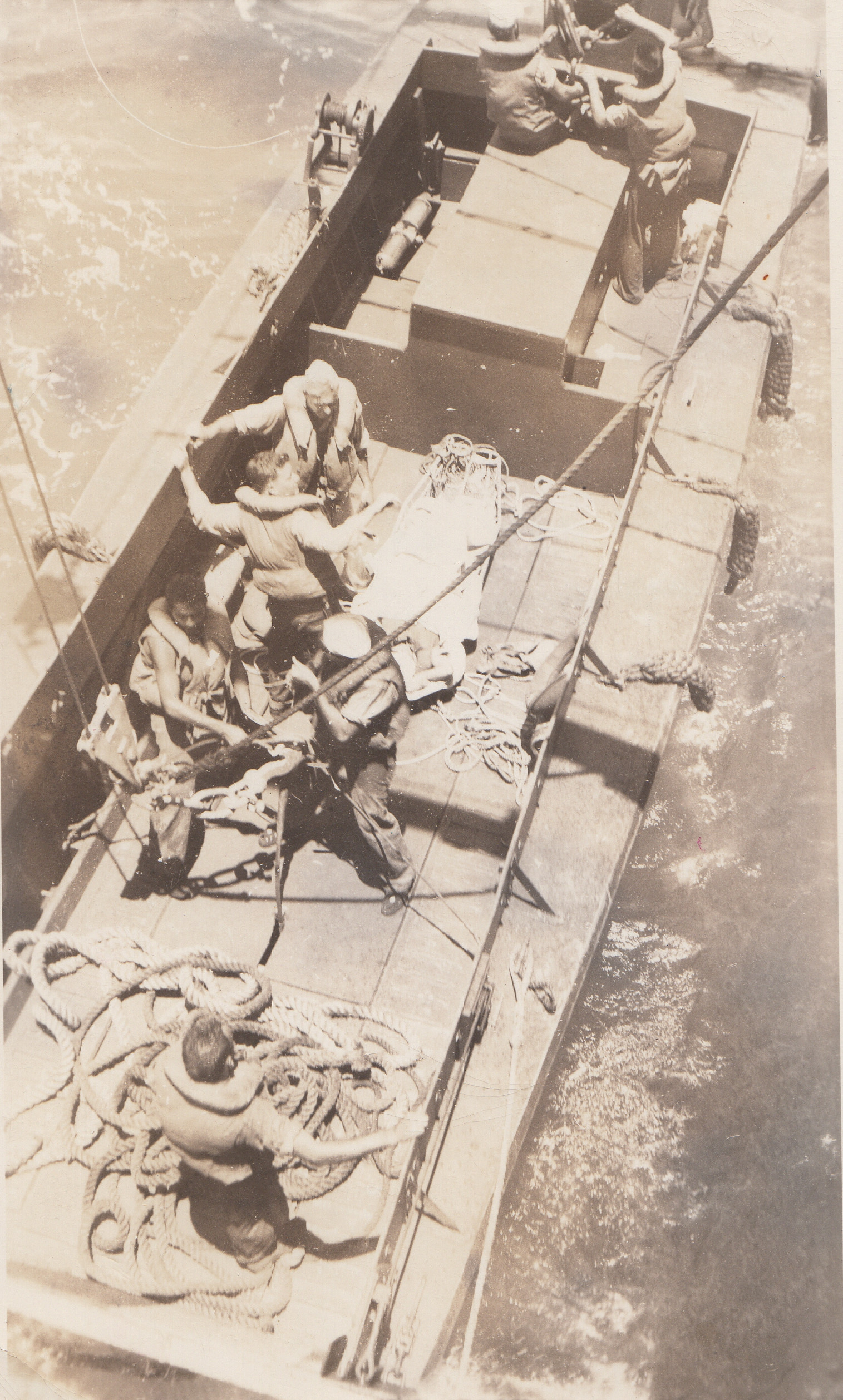
Small boat from LST-487 accepting a sick man from a destroyer

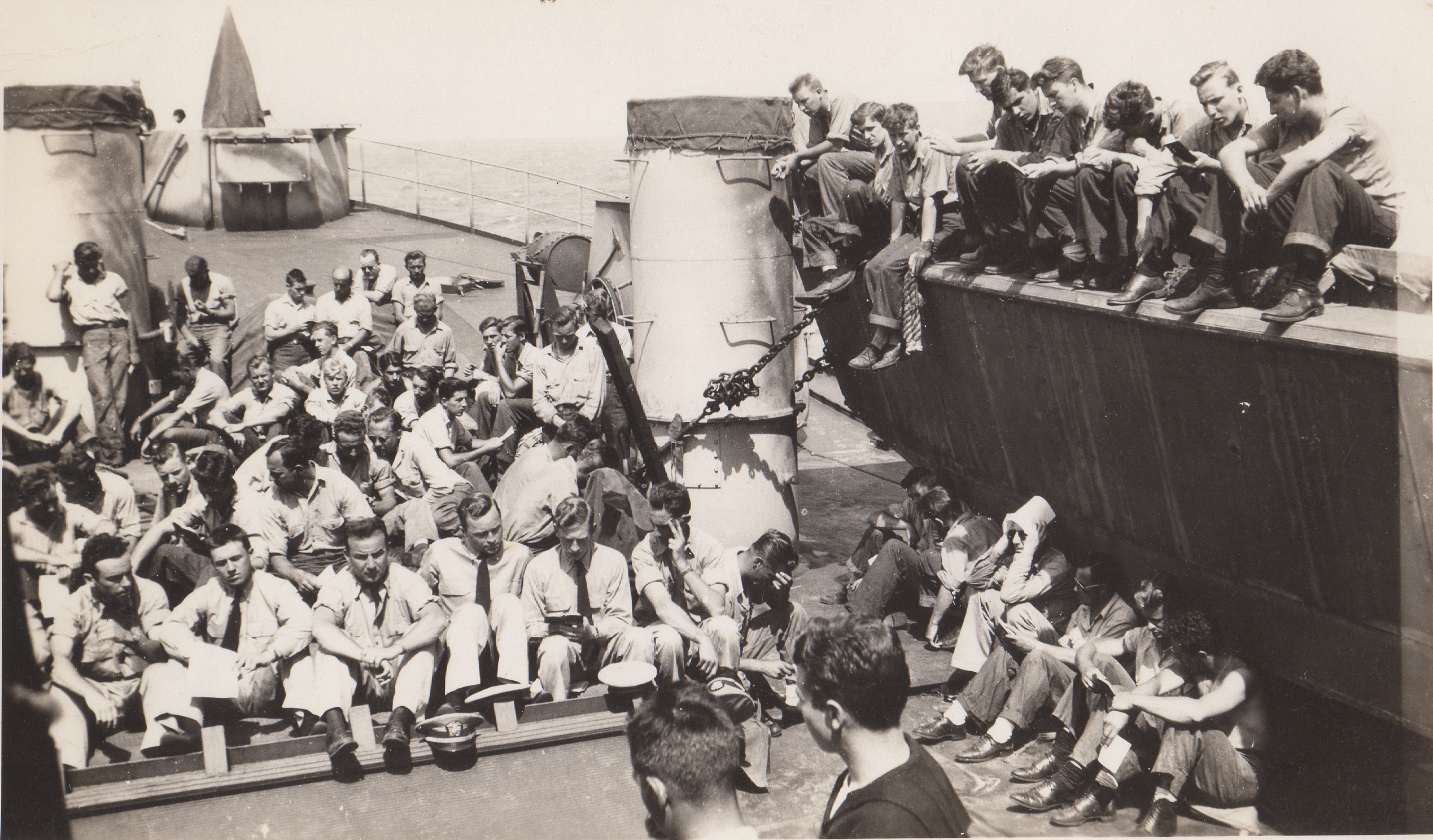
Church services aboard LST-487 in 1943

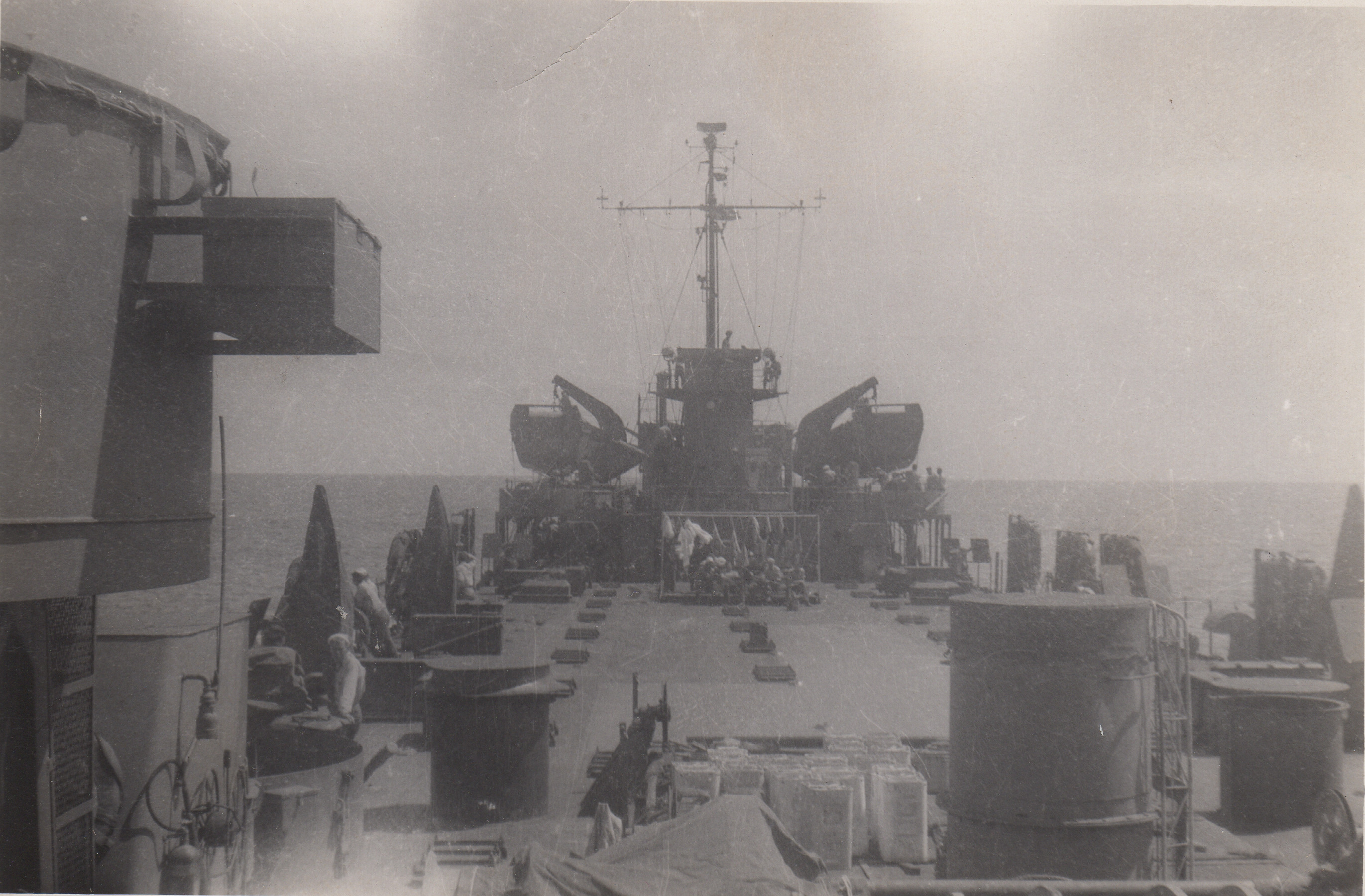
LST-487 Looking aft

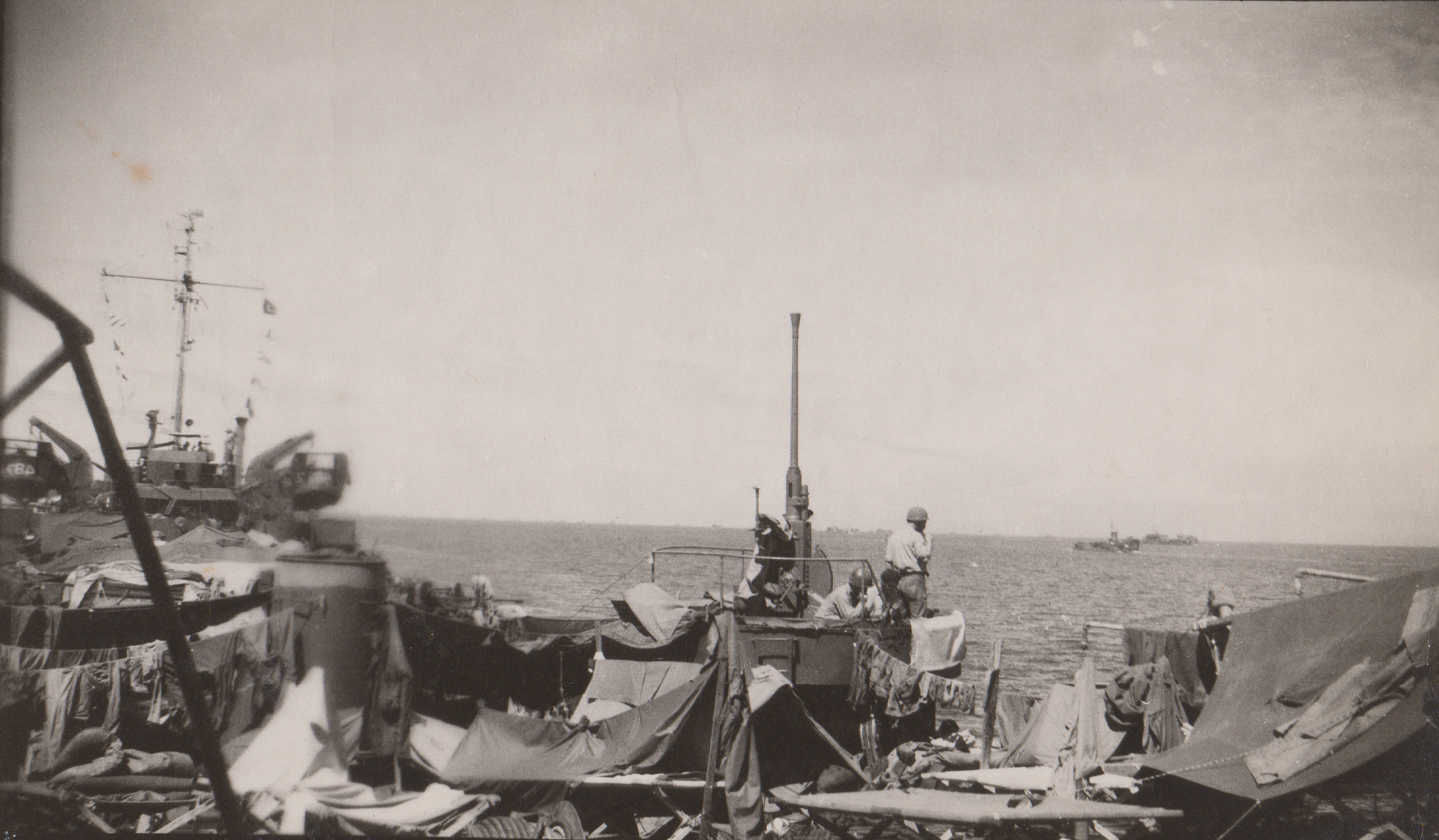
Deck of LST-487 while it is in a convoy on the way to Luzon Philippines

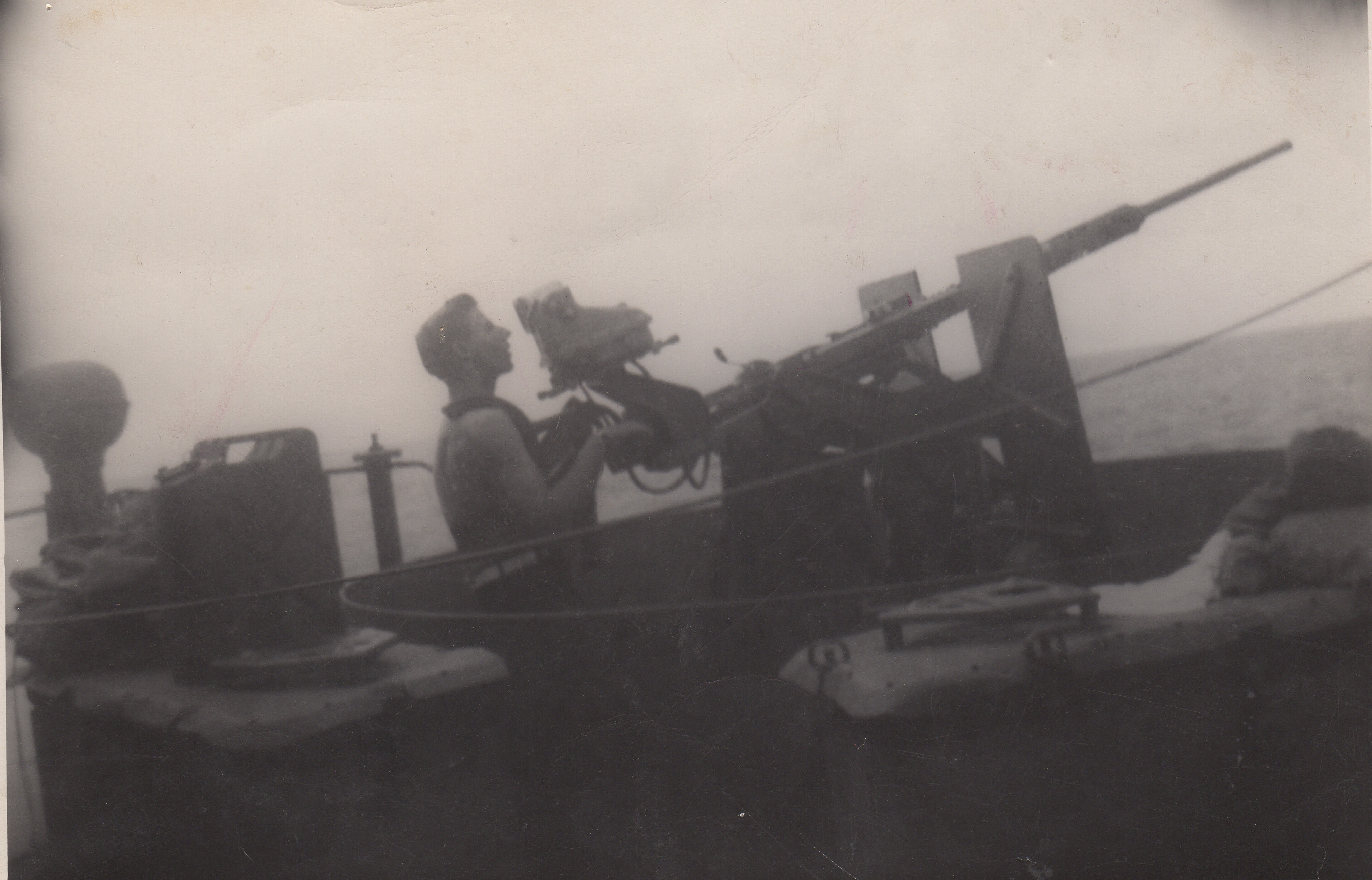
Manning the 20mm on LST-487

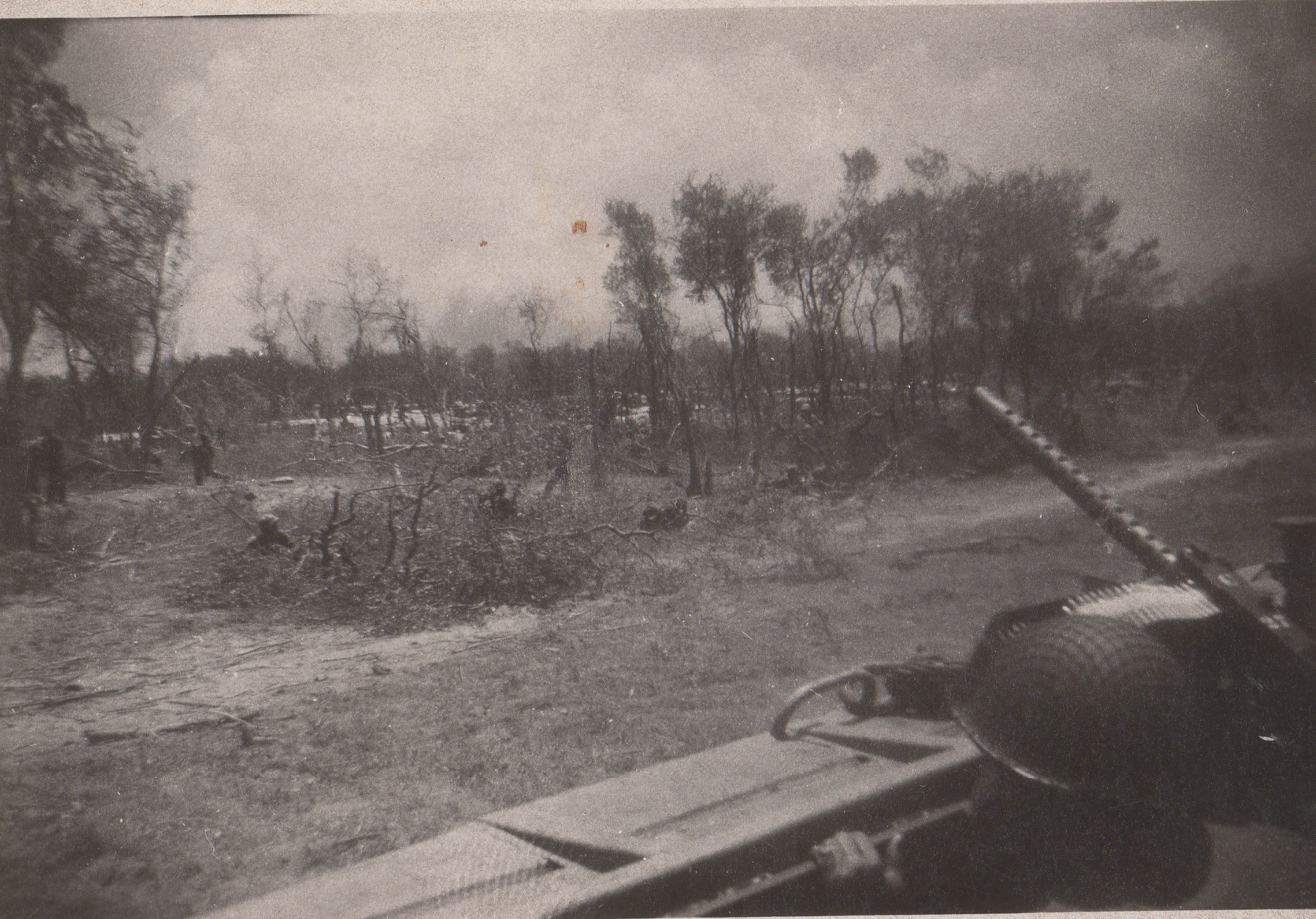
Image from a landing craft of LS-487 during the invasion of Saipan

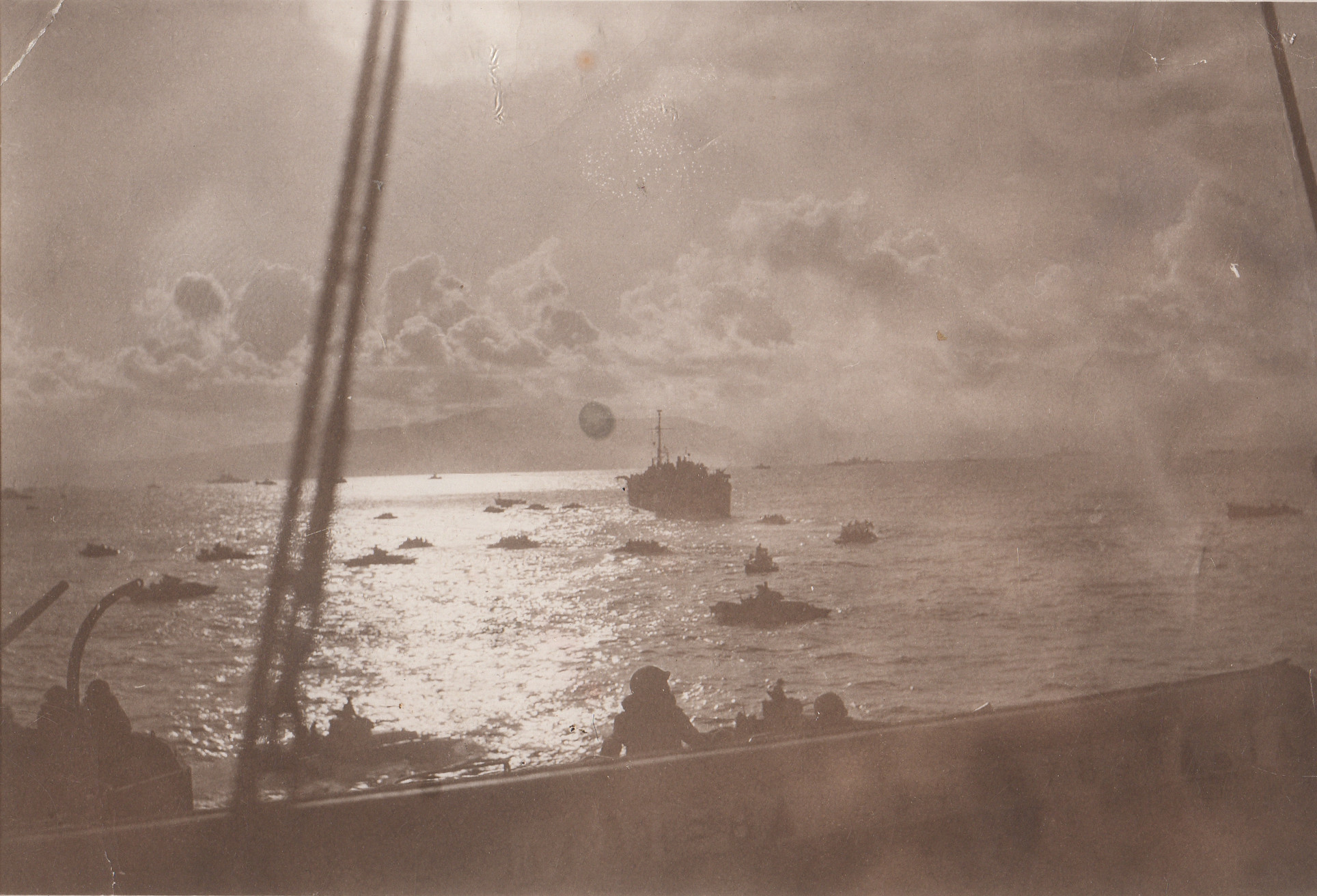
Landing craft from LST-487 launched during the Invasion of Saipan. The island is covered in smoke from shelling

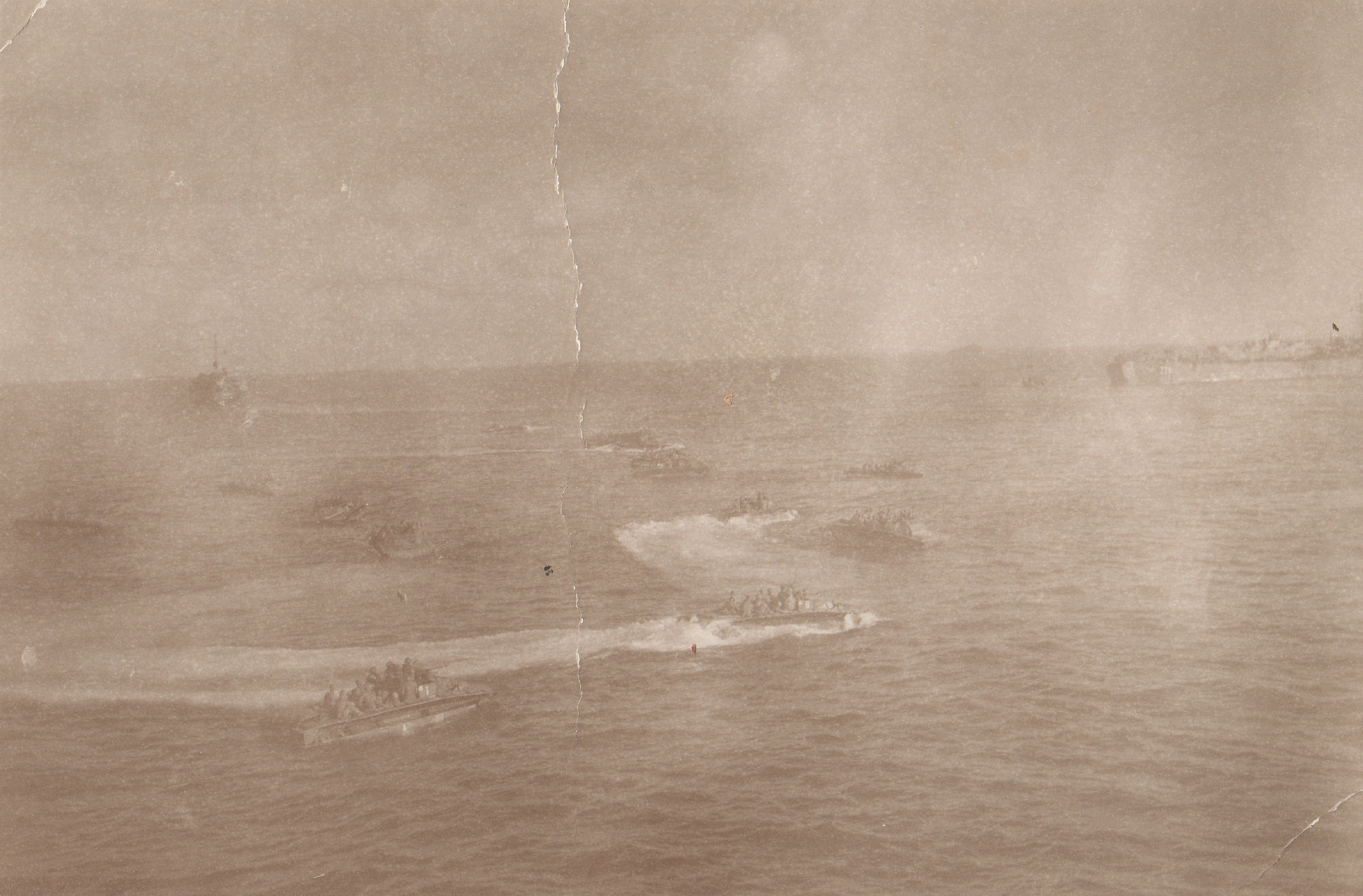
Landing craft from LST-487 launched during the invasion of Saipan

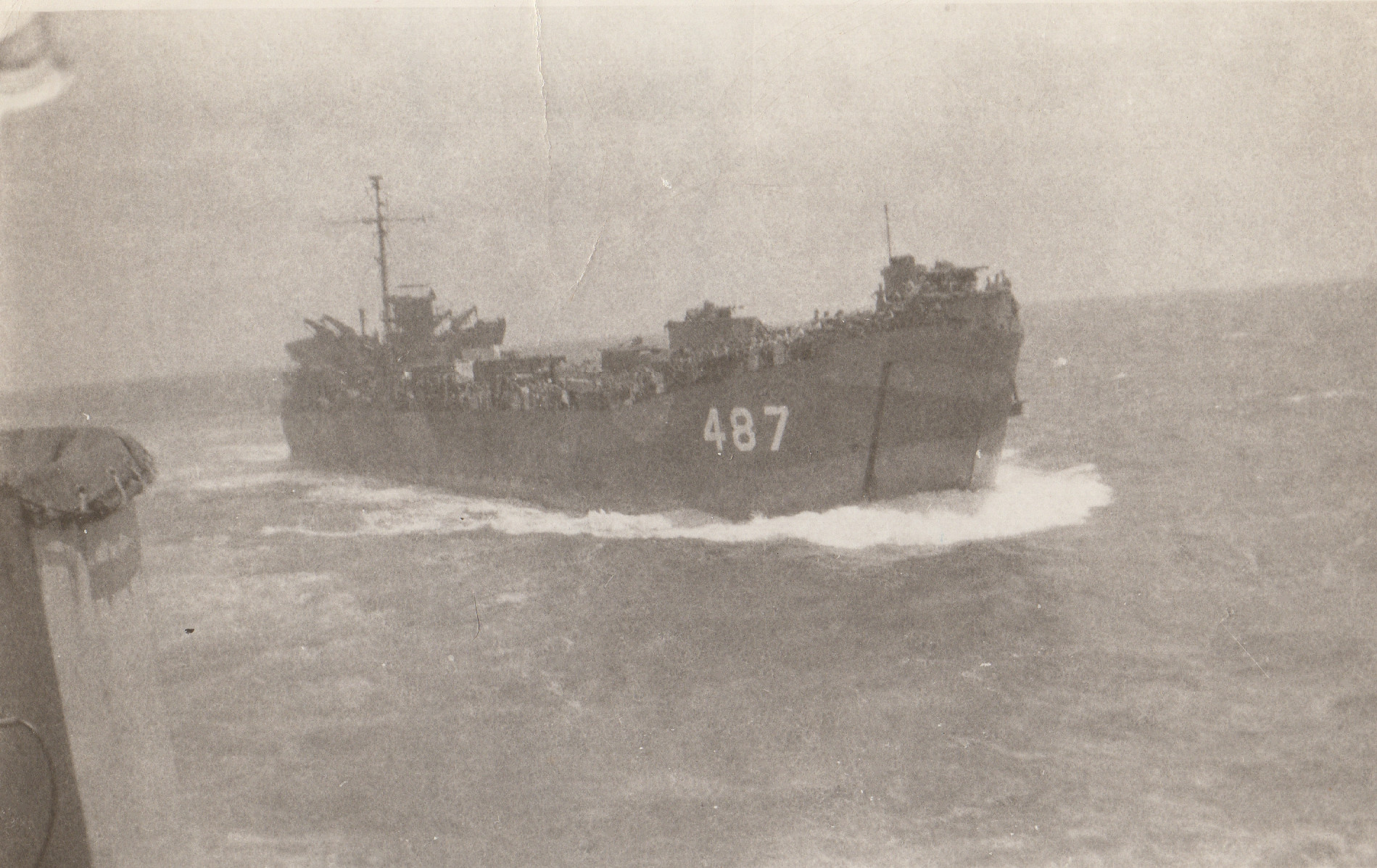
LST-487 pulling up alongside 564 at sea to exchange movies and records. Taken from 564.

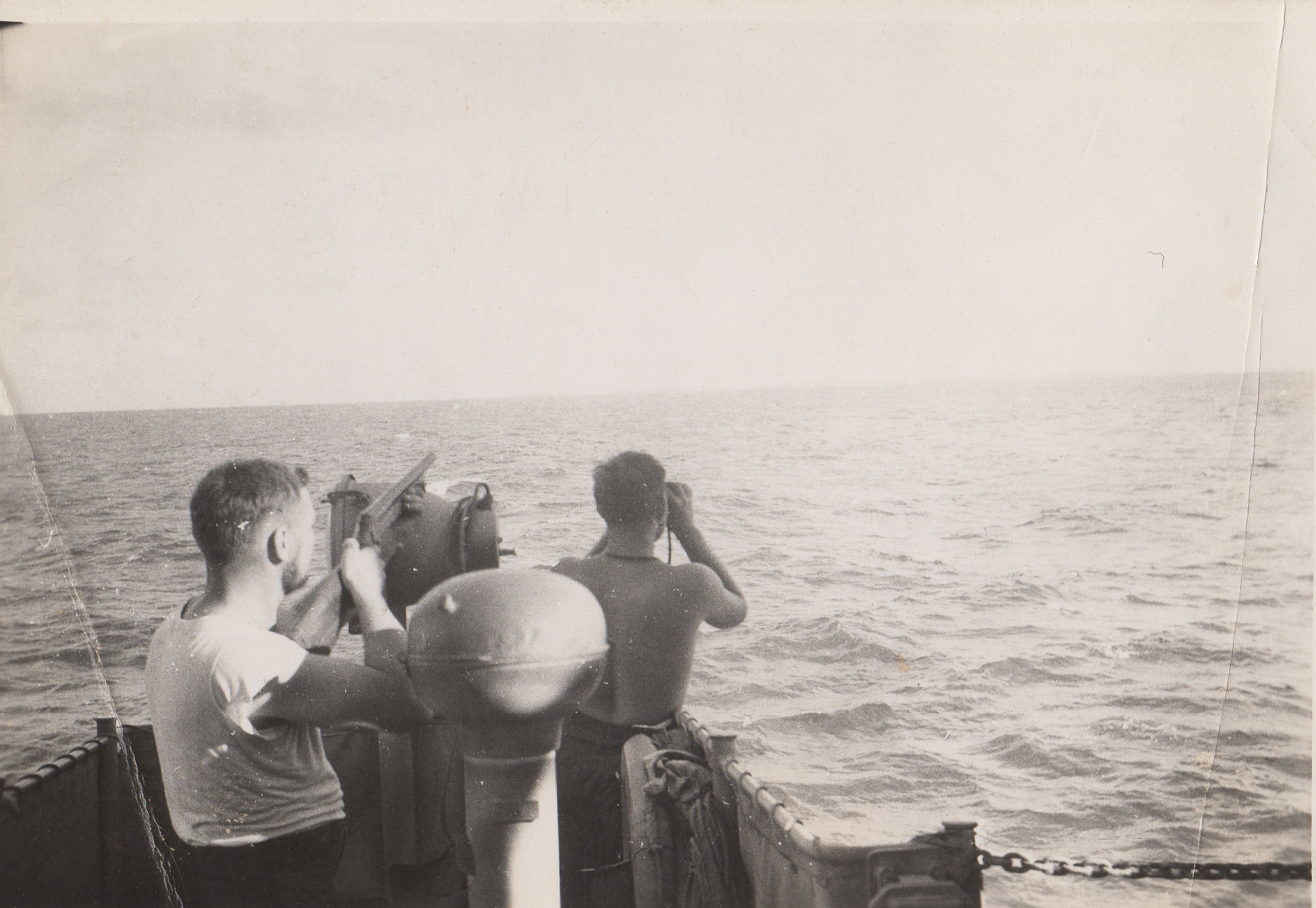
LST-487 crew searching for a Japanese pilot in the water

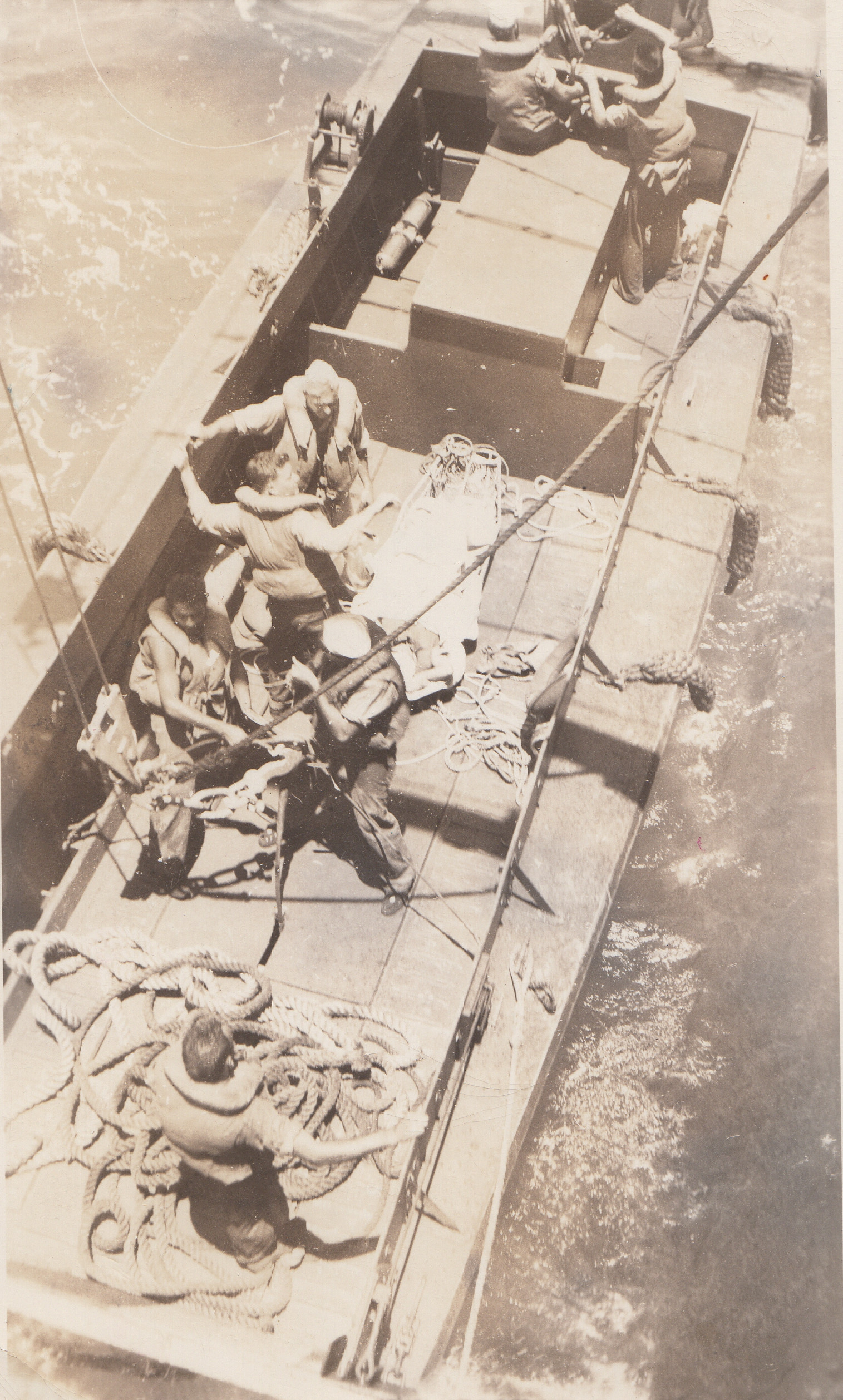
Small boat from LST-487 accepting a sick man from a destroyer

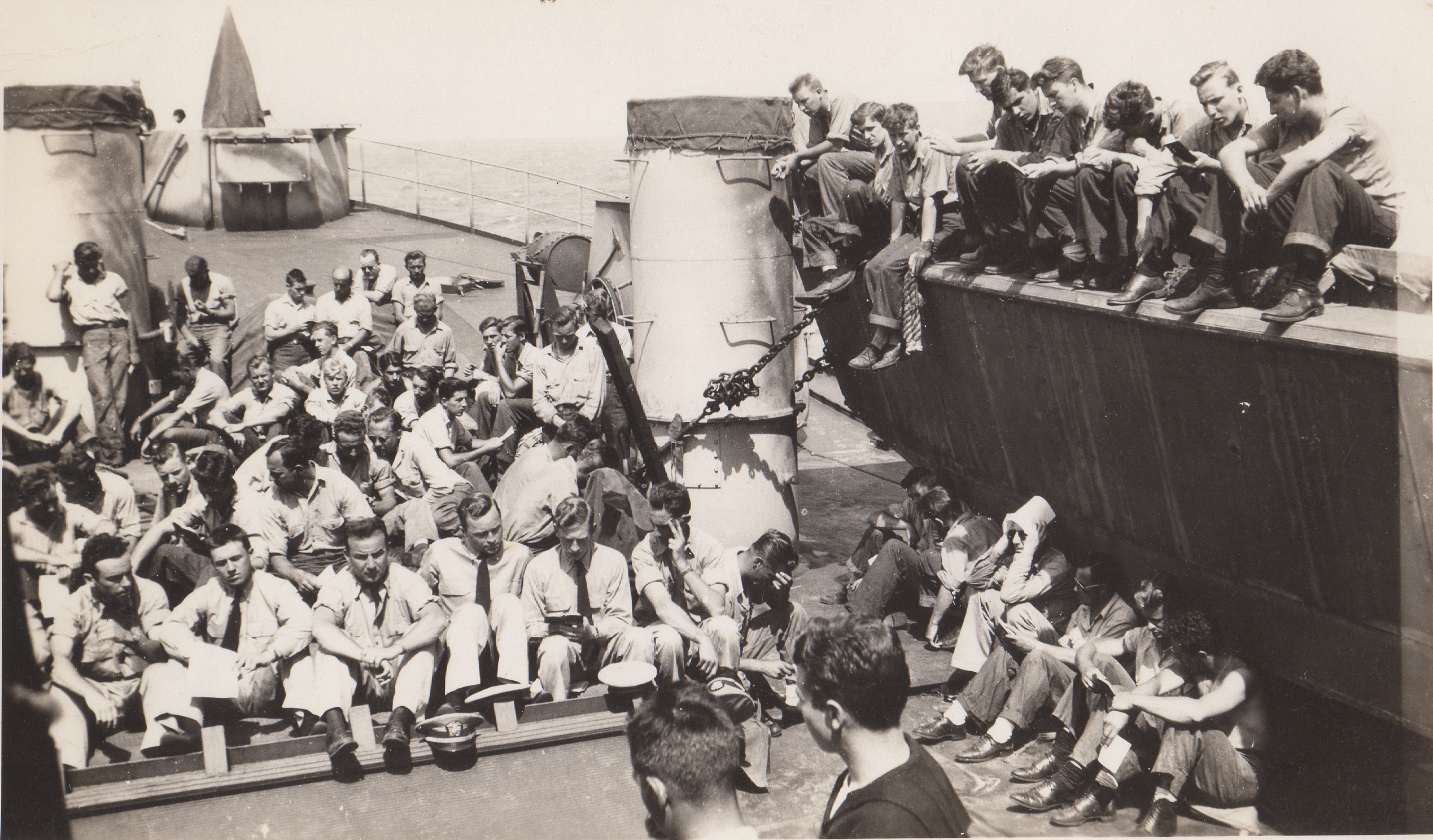
Church services aboard LST-487 in 1943

== Notes ==
Citations

== Bibliography ==
Online resources

- "LST-487". Dictionary of American Naval Fighting Ships. Naval History and Heritage Command. This article incorporates text from this source, which is in the public domain.
- "Kaiser Permanente No. 4, Richmond CA". www.ShipbuildingHistory.com. 5 February 2014.
- "USS LST-487". NavSource. 28 November 2014.
- Boyt, Wilbur (1990). History of U.S. Navy Ship L.S.T 487 WW2.
