= Orval Leroy Lewis =

Orval Leroy Lewis (July 27, 1916 – October 20, 1988) was an American mechanical and chemical engineer, and business executive, who served as president of the American Society of Mechanical Engineers (ASME) in the year 1978–79.

== Biography ==
=== Education and career ===
Lewis had graduated from Texas Tech University with a BSc in mechanical engineering in 1939, and joined the ASME the same year. In 1948 he had done some graduate work in chemical engineering at the University of Tulsa. Later in 1954 he would also obtained his MBA in industrial management at the University of Southern California.

After World War II in 1946 Lewis was project engineer the Jones ft Laughlin Supply Co, in Tulsa, Oklahoma. By 1965 he was project manager at C. F. Braun & Company in Alhambra, California, later acquired by KBR, where he was responsible for the coordination of his company's, engineering and sales of special government projects. In 1970 he had joined the Houston Research Institute, Inc., where he worked as manager of engineering.

=== Honours and awards ===
In 1963 was elected Fellow of the American Society of Mechanical Engineers, and served as its president in the year 1978–79.

In 1978 he was named a Distinguished Engineer by Texas Tech University, and in the new millennium the Texas Tech University initiated the Lewis the Orval Leroy Lewis Award, a Staff Award, in his honour. It was first awarded in 2005–06.
