= Michael Goodrich =

Michael Goodrich may refer to:

- Michael T. Goodrich, mathematician and computer scientist
- T. Michael Goodrich, CEO and chairman of BE&K
