= Trinzic =

Spin-off of KBR Inc.’s Mission Technology Solutions

- Type: Public
- Industry: Defense; Information technology Aerospace
- Key people: Michael LaRouche (President and CEO); Nicholas Veasey (Chief Financial Officer)
- Website: trinzic.com

Trinzic is a planned independent, publicly traded company, which will be formed by the spin-off of KBR Inc.’s Mission Technology Solutions (MTS) business. The spin-off was first announced in September 2025 and is set to be completed in early 2027.

As Trinzic, the business will continue to provide technology and engineering services for national security and space missions. KBR describes the company as a $5 billion-annual revenue entity with 20,000 employees. KBR’s remaining business, Sustainable Technology Solutions (STS), will remain under the KBR name.

In June 2026, KBR named incoming leadership for the spin-off: Michael LaRouche as president and CEO, and Nicholas Veasey as executive vice president and CFO.

In July 2026, brand details were announced including the name Trinzic, logo, and tagline.
