= KBR, Inc. =

American engineering and defense contractor

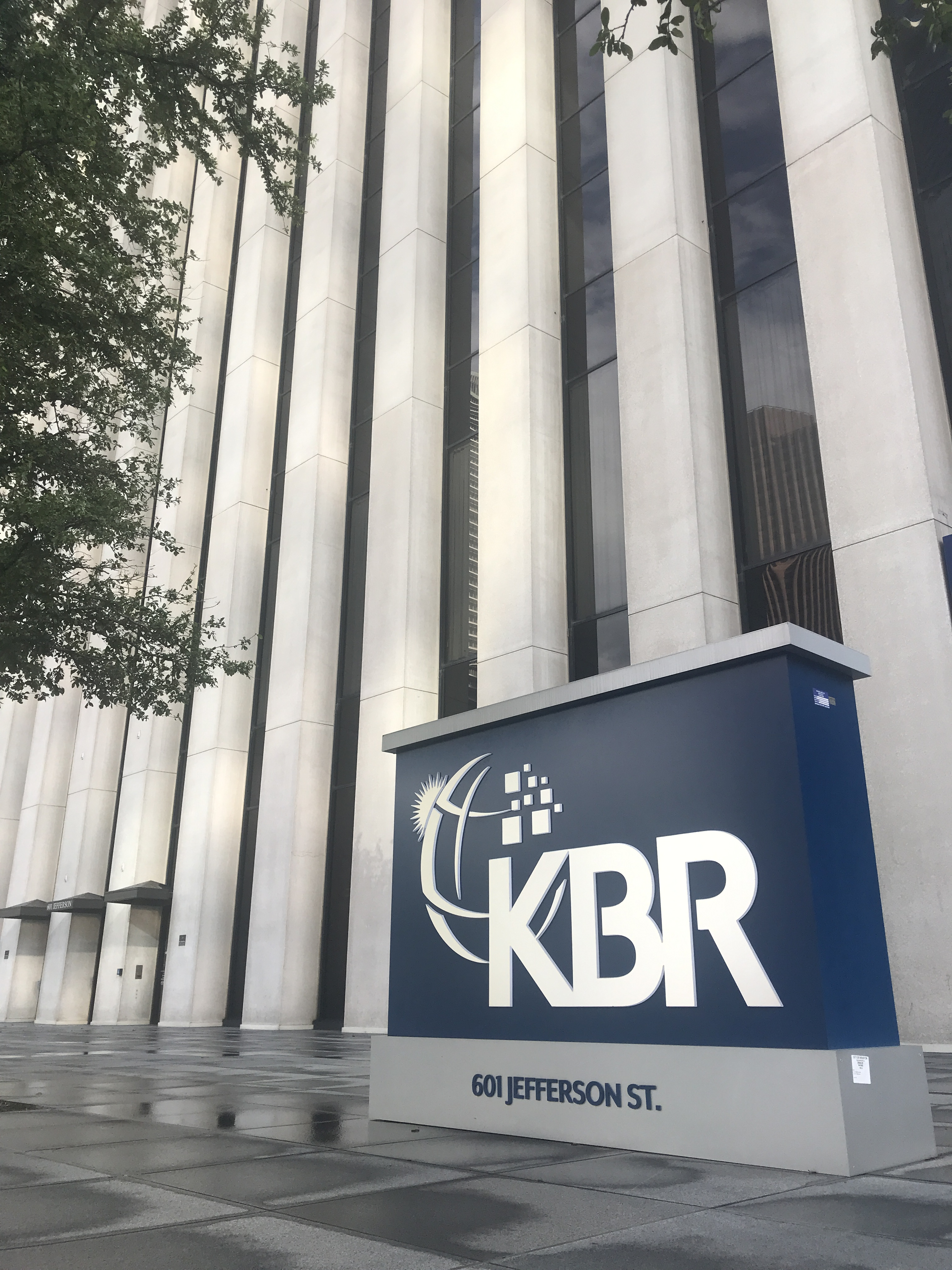
- KBR Tower, the headquarters of KBR
- Formerly: Kellogg Brown & Root
- Type: Public
- Traded as: NYSE: KBR; S&P 400 Component
- Industry: Engineering; Construction
- Founded: 1901: M.W. Kellogg; 1940s: Brown & Root; 1962: Halliburton; 2006: KBR, Inc.
- Headquarters: KBR Tower; Houston, Texas, U.S.
- Key people: Stuart Bradie (president and CEO); Shad Evans (CFO)
- Revenue: ▲US$7.742 billion (2024)
- Operating income: ▲US$662 million (2024)
- Net income: ▲US$381 million (2024)
- Total assets: ▲US$6.663 billion (2024)
- Total equity: ▼US$1.467 billion (2024)
- Number of employees: ▲ c. 38,000 (2024)
- Website: KBR.com

KBR, Inc. (formerly Kellogg Brown & Root) is a U.S. based company operating in fields of science, technology and engineering. KBR works in various markets including aerospace, defense, industrial, intelligence, and energy. The company supports various NASA programs, international partner space agencies, and commercial partners.

KBR was created in 1998 when M.W. Kellogg merged with Halliburton's construction subsidiary, Brown & Root, to form Kellogg Brown & Root. In 2006, the company separated from Halliburton and completed an initial public offering on the New York Stock Exchange. The company's corporate offices are in the KBR Tower in downtown Houston.

In September 2025, KBR announced plans to spin-off Mission Technology Solutions, its government services business, into an independent public company. The new company will operate under the name Trinzic with completion targeted for January 2027.

== History ==
=== M. W. Kellogg (1901–1998) ===
M.W. Kellogg Company was founded by Morris Woodruff Kellogg in New York City in 1901. At first, it specialized in oil refining and pipe design. In 1905 the company moved its headquarters to Jersey City, where it remained until 1971.

Kellogg's entry into process engineering initially focused on the Fleming cracking process, but in the 1920s Kellogg partnered with The Texas Company (Texaco) and Standard Oil of Indiana to purchase the Cross thermal cracking process. Kellogg set up one of the first petroleum laboratories in the country in 1926 to commercialize and then license the technology. This led to Kellogg building some 130 units in the United States and abroad.

In the 1940s, M.W. Kellogg built the first commercial FCC (fluid catalytic cracking) unit. It was commissioned in May 1942. Over the next two years, the company built 22 of the 34 FCC units constructed throughout the U.S.

Even bigger than the refining work was K-25, the gaseous diffusion plant at Oak Ridge, Tennessee, developed by Kellogg subsidiary the Kellex Corporation, built as part of the Manhattan Project. This period also included the development of the Benedict–Webb–Rubin (BWR) equation of state which has since become an industry mainstay and provided the basis for Kellogg's lead in cryogenics.

The 1950s Kellogg technology expanded into steam pyrolysis, Orthoflow fluid catalytic cracking, phenol-from-cumene and coal-to-synthetic fuels technologies and the 1960s saw the growth in helium recovery, ethylene, and the development of Kellogg's ammonia process. Kellogg maintained New York offices at 225 Broadway in the Transportation Building until 1956 when it moved to 711 Third Avenue in Midtown.

In 1973, M.W. Kellogg received five contracts from China for the construction of large-scale ammonia plants. Kellogg's international work expanded to include major ammonia complexes in China, Indonesia, and Mexico as well as an LNG liquefaction plant in Algeria and two receiving terminals in the United States, the world's largest LPG plant in Kuwait and several fluid catalytic cracking units in Mexico.

Kellogg underwent numerous acquisitions and name changes until 1987, when it was acquired by Dresser Industries, a provider of integrated services and project management for the oil and gas industry. Ten years later, Halliburton acquired Dresser, and combined Kellogg with the company Brown & Root to create a new, larger subsidiary – Kellogg Brown & Root (KBR).

=== Brown & Root (1919–1998) ===
Brown & Root was founded in Texas in 1919 by Herman Brown and Daniel Root, with money provided by Root (Brown's brother in law). Root soon died and Herman Brown's younger brother, George R. Brown, joined the company in 1922 (according to Robert A. Caro's The Path to Power). The company began its operations by building roads in Texas.

One of its first large-scale projects, according to the book Cadillac Desert, was building a dam on the Texas Colorado River near Austin during the Depression years. For assistance in federal payments, the company turned to the local Congressman, Lyndon Johnson. Brown & Root was the principal source of campaign funds after Johnson's initial run for Congress in 1937, in return for persuading the Bureau of Reclamation to change its rules against paying for a dam on land the federal government did not own, a decision that had to go all the way to President Franklin Delano Roosevelt. After other very profitable construction projects for the federal government, Brown & Root gave massive sums of cash for Johnson's first run for the U.S. Senate in 1941.

During World War II, Brown & Root built the Naval Air Station Corpus Christi and its subsidiary Brown Shipbuilding produced a series of warships for the U.S. government. In 1947 Brown & Root built one of the world's first offshore oil platforms.

According to Tracy Kidder's book Mountains Beyond Mountains, Brown & Root was a contractor in the Péligre Dam project. The project was designed by the U.S. Army Corps of Engineers and financed by the Export-Import Bank of the United States.

=== Kellogg Brown & Root under Halliburton (1998–2007) ===
Following the death of Herman Brown, Halliburton Energy Services acquired Brown & Root in December 1962. According to Dan Briody, who wrote a book on the subject, the company became part of a consortium called RMK-BRJ that built about 85 percent of the infrastructure needed by the U.S. Armed Forces during the Vietnam War. In 1967, the Government Accounting Office alleged that Brown & Root had been unaccountable with public funds and allowed materials to be stolen. Donald Rumsfeld expressed concern that their contracts were not adequately audited. At this time, protesters derided Brown & Root as a symbol of war profiteering, dubbing the company "Burn & Loot".

In 1989, Halliburton acquired another major engineering and construction contractor, C. F. Braun Inc., of Alhambra California, and merged it into Brown & Root. From 1995 to 2002, Halliburton KBR was awarded at least $2.5 billion to construct and run military bases, some in secret locations, as part of the U.S. Army's Logistics Civil Augmentation Program (LOGCAP).

In September 2005, under a competitive bid contract it won in July 2005 to provide debris removal and other emergency work associated with natural disasters, KBR started assessment of the cleanup and reconstruction of Gulf Coast Marine and Navy facilities damaged in the aftermath of Hurricane Katrina. The facilities include: Naval Station Pascagoula, Naval Station Gulfport, the John C. Stennis Space Center in Mississippi, two smaller U.S. Navy facilities in New Orleans, Louisiana, and others in the Gulf Coast region.

=== Formation and growth of KBR, Inc. (2007–2024) ===
Halliburton announced on April 5, 2007, that it had separated from KBR, which had been its contracting, engineering, and construction unit as a part of the company for 44 years. On November 16, 2006, KBR shares were offered for the public in an initial public offering with shares priced at $17. The shares closed up more than 22 percent to $20.75 a share on the first trading day.

On May 7, 2008, the company announced that it would acquire Birmingham, Alabama-based engineering and construction firm BE&K for $550 million. KBR described the deal as part of its strategy to grow its services business and re-establish itself as a leading North American contractor and maintenance services provider.

In May 2019, the company introduced new branding. At the end of 2023, KBR released KCap, a decarbonization technology offered in partnership with Hindustan Petroleum Corporation Ltd (HPCL), India.

As of 2024, the company supports various NASA programs, educational institutions, international partner space agencies, and commercial partners.

=== Spin-off of Mission Technology Solutions business as Trinzic (2025–present) ===
In September 2025, KBR’s board of directors approved the spin-off of the company’s government services division, Mission Technology Solutions (MTS). MTS is set to become a new, independent publicly-traded company on January 4, 2027. After the spinoff, the company's sustainable technology business will continue to operate as KBR.

In June 2026, Michael LaRouche was named President and CEO and Nicholas Veasey was named Executive Vice President and CFO of the spin-off. On July 30, 2026, KBR announced the new company would operate under the name Trinzic.

== Operations ==
=== GICS Code Reclassification ===
In April 2019, KBR's GICS code was reclassified as an IT consulting company by stock traders. MSCI, a New York firm that manages how companies are classified on various stock exchanges, reclassified KBR as a company specializing in "IT Consulting & Other Services." KBR has made a shift away from engineering and construction projects to government contracts that include information technology and other support services. KBR's government services sector accounted for more than 70 percent of the company's $4.9 billion revenue in 2018.

=== Facilities ===
KBR maintains offices and operational facilities in multiple countries supporting its engineering, technology, and professional services businesses. The company's corporate headquarters are located in Houston, Texas, where KBR occupies approximately 900,000 square feet of office space at 601 Jefferson Street.

==== Corporate headquarters ====
In 2008, KBR announced plans to develop a new office complex near the intersection of the Grand Parkway and Interstate 10 in western Harris County, Texas, between Houston and Katy, while maintaining a corporate presence in Downtown Houston. Later that year, the company canceled the project, citing economic conditions.

In January 2010, KBR announced plans to expand its downtown Houston presence and extend its lease commitments. The expansion replaced the previously proposed Harris County development and increased KBR's leased office space in downtown to more than 1.2 million square feet (110,000 m²).

==== Innovation studio ====
In 2026, KBR opened an Innovation Studio in Bengaluru, India, in partnership with Applied Computing. The facility supports industrial artificial intelligence applications, remote monitoring, and advisory services using KBR's INSITE 3.0 platform and Applied Computing's Orbital system, for clients in the energy and industrial sectors and to expand KBR's digital capabilities in industrial operations.

==== Aerospace Environment Protection Lab ====
KBR's Aerospace Environment Protection Lab is in San Antonio. It was previously the Brooks Air Force Base. The lab is used for intensive training of United States Air Force, Navy, and Marine Corps aviators. It includes "the pit," which houses a centrifuge that simulates high G-forces; altitude chambers used for training deep space pilots or astronauts; and hyperbaric chambers used to help the body heal and fight infections. It also houses the Panama Chamber, which is the oldest known dive chamber in the world. It was used during the construction of the Panama Canal.

==== Digital Engineering Lab ====
In May 2025, KBR opened its new Digital Engineering Lab in Dayton, Ohio. At the lab, KBR and Wright-Patterson Air Force Base leadership plan, design, and test various systems for Air Force and military customers. The lab allows for the creation of prototype digital twins and uses KBR's “Game” simulation design tool to test designs before fabrication.

== Sustainable technologies ==
KBR licenses PureSAF technology, a sustainable aviation fuel technology developed by Swedish Biofuels.

In 2023, KBR was awarded a design and engineering contract from The Chemours Company to “increase and advance” technology for its membrane technology to support the hydrogen economy.

In 2024, KBR was selected to provide project management services for the design and construction of a refinery in Lobito, Benguela Province. It was also selected by First State Hydrogen, Inc. to support the "feasibility and development" of its first clean hydrogen production facility in the U.S. mid-Atlantic region.

In September 2024, KTJV, a KBR and Technip Energies joint venture, received a contract to convert an existing natural gas import regasification terminal to a liquefied gas export plant.

In 2026, PureSAF was selected for proposed commercial-scale facilities in Latvia, Singapore and Kazakhstan, including a planned 100,000-ton-per-year facility in Singapore and Kazakhstan's first SAF production plant.

=== Sustainable technology & decarbonization ===
In the 2020s and early 2024, KBR announced multiple sustainable technology, decarbonization, and low-carbon projects worldwide. Some of these include:

==== Ammonia Technology Projects ====
KBR provides ammonia technology, engineering, and catalyst solutions and has licensed more than 260 ammonia plants worldwide. In 2026, the company supported conventional and green ammonia projects across Argentina, Morocco, Japan, and Spain. Its ammonia-related activities include catalyst, digitalization, and low-carbon ammonia capabilities.

- KazAzot (Kazakhstan): KBR’s ammonia technology was selected for what is described as the country’s first world-scale fertilizer complex.
- Shell Blue Horizons (Oman): Shell selected KBR’s “blue ammonia” technology for the Blue Horizons project, supporting hydrogen and ammonia production in Oman.
- AMUFERT (Angola): KBR’s ammonia technology was adopted for a major nitrogen-fertilizer production facility in Angola.

==== Refining and Petrochemicals ====
- Zhejiang Petroleum (China): KBR’s Residuum Oil Supercritical Extraction (ROSE) technology was chosen for what is reported as the largest solvent deasphalting (SDA) unit in China.
- Sabic Fujian Petrochemicals: KBR’s phenol technology was selected by Sabic Fujian for a petrochemical project in Fujian Province, China.

==== Sustainable Aviation Fuels ====
- Avina (U.S.): KBR entered into a front-end engineering and design (FEED) and technology licensing agreement with Avina for sustainable aviation fuel (SAF) technology.

==== Propylene Oxide ====
- Sumitomo Chemical Alliance: KBR and Sumitomo Chemical formed a technology licensing alliance to develop more sustainable methods of producing propylene oxide.

==== Lithium Extraction ====
- GeoLith Alliance: KBR and GeoLith entered an exclusive alliance to globally license a proprietary direct-lithium-extraction (DLE) technology that aims to reduce emissions and water usage.

== Strategic infrastructure ==
KBR provides strategic infrastructure services in water, wastewater and municipal services sectors. In Australia, the company is a member of the ABK Joint Venture, alongside Abergeldie and BMD, which delivers water infrastructure programs for South East Water. Projects undertaken include the Monterey Recycled Water Scheme and the Dingley Recycled Water Scheme, which expand recycled water networks and reduce demand on potable water supplies.

In 2025, KBR developed a remote-controlled vehicle equipped with LiDAR and high-definition imaging technology to inspect wastewater infrastructure for Central Coast Council in New South Wales. During its first deployment, the vehicle completed a 640-meter sewer inspection between Terrigal and North Avoca, reported as the longest sewer inspection of its kind undertaken using remotely operated technology. The project demonstrated the potential of advanced digital and robotic solutions to improve the safety and efficiency of infrastructure asset management.

== Mission support ==
KBR is heavily involved in mission support for several government agencies, including NASA, providing training and care for American astronauts. It also provides engineering and design support for different industries, including the energy sector.

=== NASA ===
In 1961, Brown & Root (KBR predecessor) won the contract for architectural design services for what would later be named the Lyndon B. Johnson Space Center (JSC). As of 2024, KBR is one of the largest human spaceflight support companies.

In 2020, KBR was awarded a NASA contract to develop and execute spaceflight operations at Marshall Space Flight Center. Under the contract, KBR was responsible for performing International Space Station payload operations and supporting the testing of NASA's flagship space launch system.

In 2021, NASA awarded KBR and Aerodyne Industries a $531 million contract for systems engineering at NASA's Goddard Space Flight Center in Maryland. KBR also houses the low pressure chamber designed to test the high altitude flying of the new X-59 research aircraft being designed by NASA.

In 2023, KBR was the Large Business Prime Contractor of the Year at the NASA Johnson Space Center and NASA Goddard Space Flight Center. At the time, some of the services KBR provided included “mission planning and preparation, astronaut and mission control center training, real-time flight execution, and future exploration vehicle design for all of NASA’s human spaceflight programs under the JSC’s Flight Operations Directorate”.

That year, KBR worked with Axiom and Collins Aerospace to design and make next-generation spacesuits for NASA astronauts. The company also won a potential nine-year contract to continue mission and flight crew operations support work for NASA's human space exploration programs, and NASA selected the Space and Technology Solutions team - a joint venture between KBR and Intuitive Machines - to provide “multifaceted engineering support for key orbital systems.” This latter contract supported and built on the progress of NASA's Joint Polar Satellite System program.

A year later, in 2024, KBR was chosen as NASA's Agency-Level Large Business Prime Contractor of the Year. As of July, KBR had three prime contracts with NASA, including Ground Systems and Missions Operations III, as well as multiple subcontracts and joint ventures.

In January 2024, KBR and a team from NASA Ames Research Center designed and built a robot system that can autonomously build structures using specially designed lattice blocks. The robot could be used to autonomously build shelters for astronauts before they land on various planets.

In August 2025, KBR was granted a $2.45 billion NASA contract to continue research focused on astronaut health and health risks for human spaceflight missions. The contract is set for five years, with the option to extend for another five years, and an estimated value of $3.6 billion. In the same month, KBR along with Axiom Space completed three successful underwater tests of their next-generation spacesuit, Axiom Extravehicular Mobility Unit (AxEMU), at NASA's Neutral Buoyancy Lab. The spacesuit is being tested for use on NASA's Artemis III mission.

=== Space technology ===
In 1968, KBR was awarded a contract to conduct cardiovascular health research on astronauts.

The company announced on November 7, 2017, that KBR secured a contract to provide astronaut medical support services for the European Space Agency's European Astronaut Center Space Medicine Office in Cologne, Germany.

Scientists and engineers working for KBR contributed to the development and deployment of the James Webb Space Telescope, which launched in 2022, as part of various Mechanical Integration Services and Technology contracts.

In 2024, KBR was awarded a U.S. Navy contract for the continued development of space science instrument systems at the Naval Research Lab (NRL). The focus of the contract was on the “design, development, analysis, fabrication, inspection, assembly, integration, testing, and documentation of sophisticated space science instruments and experimental payloads.”

For over a decade, KBR worked with the U.S. government on a space domain awareness platform called Iron Stallion. The platform tracks everything in space, runs predictive models on where assets are supposed to be, and flags users when that is not the case. As of June 2024, the platform was in a cloud environment, converted for commercial use. It had been sold to the U.K. and Australia.

== Government Contracts ==
KBR provides various support services to government agencies. This has included engineering services, base operating support, human performance optimization (HPO) services, logistics and life support services, and cybersecurity services.

=== Kosovo ===
In 1996, Brown & Root was awarded a contract to support U.S. and North Atlantic Treaty Organization (NATO) troops as part of the SFOR operation in the Balkan region. This contract was extended to also include KFOR operations in Kosovo starting in 1999. Camp Bondsteel in Ferizaj, Kosovo, was constructed by the 94th Engineer Construction Battalion together with the private Kellogg Brown & Root (KBR) under the direction of the Army Corps of Engineers.

=== Afghanistan ===
The U.S. State Department awarded KBR a $100 million contract in 2002 to build a new U.S. embassy in Kabul, Afghanistan. KBR was also awarded 15 Logistics Civil Augmentation Program (LOGCAP) task orders worth more than $216 million for work under Operation Enduring Freedom, the military name for operations in Afghanistan. These included establishing base camps at Kandahar and Bagram Air Base and training foreign troops from the Republic of Georgia.

=== Cuba ===
KBR was involved in the development of works in Cuba. Most notably, sections of the U.S. Naval base in Guantanamo, completed in 2006. Camp 6, the newest facility built for detainees at Naval Station Guantanamo Bay, was designed after a maximum-security penitentiary in the U.S.

=== Iraq ===
In the 2000s, KBR employed more American private contractors and had a larger contract with the U.S. government than any other firm in Iraq. The company's roughly 14,000 U.S. employees in Iraq provided logistical support to the U.S. military. Some U.S. Marines revived the Vietnam-era nickname 'Burn & Loot' as a name for the company during the Iraq War.

In November 2012, a dozen Oregon National Guard soldiers sued KBR for knowingly exposing them to hexavalent chromium, and were awarded more than $85 million; the soldiers were providing security to civilian workers at the Qarmat Ali water facility in 2003.

In January 2019, a case brought against KBR by hundreds of veterans, who claimed the company's practice of burning trash near barracks had sickened them, was refused by the Supreme Court, which let stand a lower court's ruling against the veterans.

== Mergers and acquisitions ==
In 2016, KBR acquired Wyle Engineering company. That same year KBR acquired Honeywell Technology Solutions Inc.

In February 2018, KBR announced that it would acquire Stinger Ghaffarian Technologies, a provider of technological solutions as well as mission operations in the aerospace sector, for $355 million. The acquisition was completed April 25, 2018.

In October 2020, KBR announced it had completed the acquisition of Centauri, LLC, a leading independent provider of space, directed energy, and other advanced technology solutions to the United States intelligence community and Department of Defense, from Arlington Capital Partners.

In October 2021, KBR purchased UK and Australian systems, engineering and technology company Frazer-Nash Consultancy from Babcock International Group for a reported £293 million.

In 2022, KBR acquired the UK-based VIMA Group, a digital transformation technology company.

In July 2024, KBR agreed to acquire LinQuest Corp., a specialist in national security space systems. The purchase was finalized in September. It set KBR up as one of the largest support contractors for the Space Force's Space Systems Command, based in Los Angeles, CA. LinQuest was merged into KBR's Government Solutions segment and Defense and Intel business unit.

== Lobbying ==
KBR engages third party lobbyists to represent the company in jurisdictions where they have business interests. For example, in South Australia, KBR is represented by lobbying firm MCM Strategic Communications.

== Recognition ==
- Worlds Best Companies of 2025 by TIME Magazine
- Top Workplaces 2025, Washington Post
- America's Greatest Workplaces in Tech & Software for 2025
- Forbes America's Best Large Employers, 2024
- Glassdoor's Best-Led Companies, 2024
- Fortune 2024 award
- NASA's Agency-Level Large Business Prime Contractor of the Year, 2024
- Large Business Prime Contractor of the Year at the NASA Johnson Space Center and NASA Goddard Space Flight Center, 2023
- Glassdoor's Best Places to Work 2026
- Glassdoor's Best Companies in Manufacturing & Energy 2026
- America's Best Companies of 2026 by Time Magazine
- World's Most Sustainable Companies of 2026 by Time Magazine
- Forbes America's Best Large Employers 2026
- Houston Companies Named Among Best Places to Work by U.S. News & World Report

== Controversy ==
=== Sexual assault and harassment lawsuits ===
Jamie Leigh Jones alleged that she was drugged and gang-raped by KBR coworkers while working in Iraq in 2005. Her allegations drew international attention and highlighted the use of mandatory arbitration clauses that blocked employees from pursuing sexual assault cases in court. In July 2011, a federal jury in Houston ruled against Jones, concluding that she had not proven her claims by the civil standard of evidence. Jones has never retracted her allegations, but the verdict cleared KBR of liability. Her case led Senator Al Franken to propose an amendment to the 2010 defense appropriations bill, which was passed in October 2009, allowing employees of firms with government contracts to take sexual assault and harassment claims to court.

That same year, Christina Ricz alleged that she was sexually assaulted by her KBR supervisor and filed a civil lawsuit; the case was later dismissed without reaching trial. Her case was one of several, along with those of Jones and Leamon, that drew attention to KBR's use of mandatory arbitration clauses, which prevented employees from bringing sexual assault claims to open court.

Additional cases surfaced in the same period. In 2005, a former employee known publicly as "Dawn Leamon" reported being raped by a coworker while on assignment in Iraq and later filed a lawsuit. In 2009, Tracy Barker secured a nearly $3 million arbitration award against KBR, following her report that she was raped at a company camp in Iraq in 2005.

Jo Frederiksen, another female employee, filed a lawsuit claiming she was “inappropriately touched, stalked, intimidated and verbally harassed” during her time with the firm in 2003. According to Frederiksen, after she complained she was moved to an even more hostile location while some of her abusers were promoted. Her lawsuit also alleged widespread tolerance of prostitution and human trafficking among KBR employees.

=== Reported harassment and complaints ===
In 2008, congressional hearings examined allegations of sexual assault and harassment involving employees of KBR and other military contractors. Legislators cited dozens of complaints from female employees, raising concerns about the use of mandatory arbitration clauses in KBR contracts that had previously prevented victims from pursuing cases in court.

Other women also alleged abuse while working for KBR. Mary Beth Kineston, an Ohio truck driver, said she was sexually harassed and groped by several KBR employees, and was later fired after reporting the threats and harassment endured by female employees.

=== Human trafficking lawsuit ===
On August 28, 2008, KBR and a Jordanian subcontractor were accused of human trafficking in a federal lawsuit filed in Los Angeles. The suit alleged that 13 Nepali men were recruited by Daoud & Partners to work in hotels and restaurants in Jordan, but upon arrival, all 13 men had their passports seized by the contractor and were sent to Iraq to work on the Al Asad Airbase. Twelve of the employees were abducted when their unprotected convoy was attacked by a group calling itself the Army of Ansar al-Sunna, while en route to the base. Shortly thereafter, a video was released of one of the men being beheaded and the other 11 shot. The remaining employee, Buddi Prasad Gurung, claims to have been held against his will for 15 months, during which time he was forced to work at the base. Reuters quoted attorney Matthew Handley as saying, "It doesn't appear that any of them knew they were going to Iraq." KBR made no public comment on the lawsuit, but released a statement which stated in part that it "in no way condones or tolerates unethical or illegal behavior."

In 2017, a U.S. appeals court refused to hold KBR liable for alleged human trafficking in connection with the 2004 kidnapping and murder by insurgents of 12 Nepali men. The men were being transported in Iraq to work for a subcontractor at a U.S. military base. This rule upheld a lower court judge's 2014 dismissal of civil claims against KBR by surviving family members and a Nepali worker who was not captured. However, the only reason the case was dismissed was because of a lack of sufficient connection with the U.S.

=== "Burn pits" lawsuits ===
Alan Metzgar et al v. KBR Inc. are a collection of lawsuits from plaintiffs who said they developed respiratory illnesses, neurological disorders, cancer, and skin diseases from living and working near open-air burn pits operated by KBR in Iraq and Afghanistan.

In 2013, a U.S. District Court judge dismissed the suits. However, the 4th U.S. Circuit Court of Appeals disagreed and sent the litigation back to court in early 2014. KBR maintained that it did not operate the primary burn pit mentioned in the suits and said that other environmental factors in combat zones could have contributed to troop health problems.

=== Questionable charges ===
In December 2008, the Senate Armed Services Committee requested an investigation into Kellogg Brown and Root because of accusations from a retired Army official, Charles M. Smith, who had managed the company’s work in Iraq. He alleged that KBR lacked credible records to support more than $200 million in spending. A KBR spokeswoman said that the company would cooperate with any government investigation.

=== Shell companies in Cayman Islands ===
According to the U.S. House Oversight and Government Reform Committee, in 2008, KBR had two subsidiaries in the Cayman Islands that were used to reduce the company's tax payments. CBS News reported that this was legal, and a practice of many contractors, but that lawmakers wanted to end the practice.

=== Bribing Nigerian officials ===
KBR admitted to paying bribes to high-ranking Nigerian officials between 1994 and 2004 to secure contracts to build and expand Nigeria's Bonny Island liquefied natural gas terminal. KBR and Halliburton paid a $402 million fine to the U.S. Justice Department, of which Halliburton paid $382 million. In a separate settlement with the U.S. Securities and Exchange Commission, Halliburton paid $177 million in profits to settle charges that KBR had violated the Foreign Corrupt Practices Act (FCPA).

Former CEO Albert Jackson Stanley, who ran KBR when it was a subsidiary to Halliburton, was sentenced to 30 months in prison via plea agreement.

=== Waxman allegations ===
KBR was accused of inflating prices for importing gasoline into Iraq. At the time KBR was a subsidiary of Halliburton, and Halliburton reported that the allegations distorted the truth.

=== Professional negligence ===
The case Harris v. KBR Inc. is a lawsuit over the death of Army Staff Sgt. Ryan Maseth who was electrocuted while taking a shower in Baghdad in 2008. The suit was filed by Maseth’s mother. She alleged that poor electrical work and maintenance on the part of KBR caused the death because the water pump in the shower was not grounded. In 2013, a trial judge made the decision to dismiss the case, but the decision was overturned by the 3rd U.S. Circuit Court of Appeals. KBR counsel Mark Lowes said that the company "warned the Army that existing buildings in Iraq posed danger to troops and there was no evidence KBR installed the pump."

=== Employee safety in warzones ===
As of June 9, 2008, 81 American and foreign KBR employees and subcontractors have been killed, and more than 380 have been wounded by hostile action while performing services under the company's government contracts in Iraq, Afghanistan and Kuwait. Family members of injured or killed employees have sued the company in relation to the 2004 Iraq KBR convoy ambush.

=== Late payment ===
In the UK in April 2019, Kellogg Brown & Root was suspended from the UK Government's Prompt Payment Code for failing to pay suppliers on time.

=== Employment Dispute ===
On September 16, 2022, the Philippine Department of Migrant Workers Secretary, Susan Ople, confirmed a Washington Post report that 800 Filipino workers were stuck at a remote US military base on Diego Garcia in the Indian Ocean due to an employment dispute with KBR. DMW Ople reported, “They are stranded in the sense that they can't go on vacation. They are afraid that if they go home to the Philippines, the POEA won't let them come back, or they'll be fired from work.” KBR said that the Filipino workers were able to take military flights to Japan and Bahrain, and that KBR then covered the cost of their onward travel to the Philippines.

== See also ==
- Top 100 Contractors of the U.S. federal government
