= History of Southwest Airlines =

History of a U.S. low cost airline

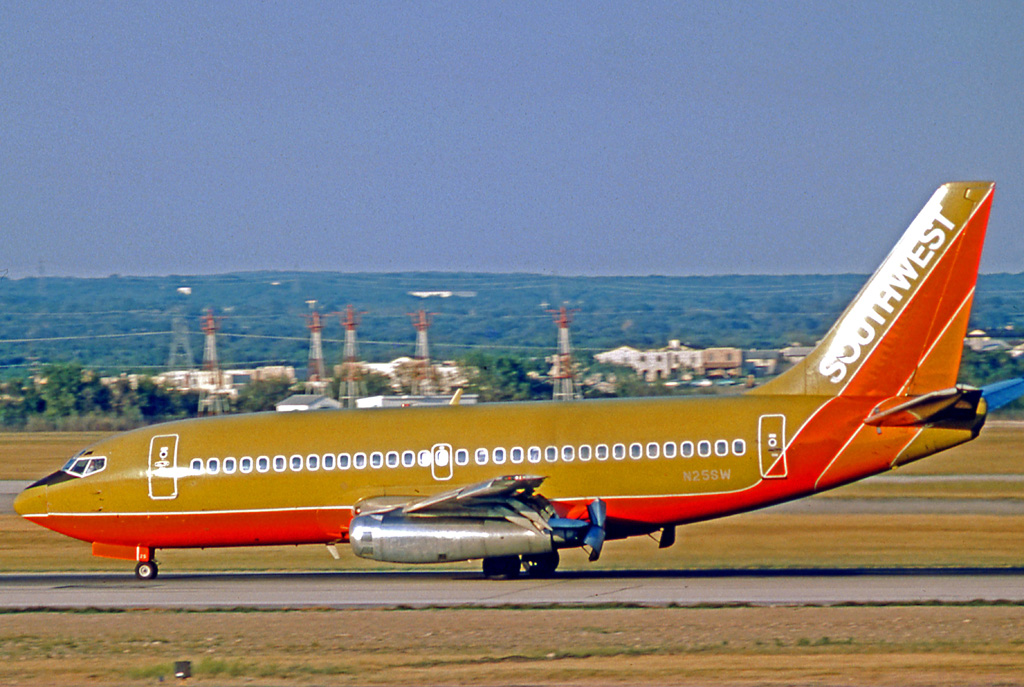
Boeing 737-200 in original livery in 1975

Southwest Airlines was founded in 1966 by Herbert Kelleher and Rollin King, and incorporated as Air Southwest Co. in 1967. The company planned to operate as an intrastate airline, flying a Texas Triangle network between Dallas, Houston, and San Antonio. By flying only within the state of Texas Southwest would be exempt from regulation by the federal Civil Aeronautics Board, allowing it to undercut the prices of competitors. Three other airlines (Braniff, Trans-Texas, and Continental) sued to prevent the company from starting up. The lawsuits were resolved in 1970, and in 1971 the airline changed its name to Southwest Airlines. In 1975, Southwest began flying to other cities in Texas, and in 1979, after passage of the Airline Deregulation Act, it began flying to adjacent states. It started service to the East and the Southeast in the 1990s, and Denver in 2006, which is now its most popular destination. Southwest Airlines was profitable for 47 consecutive fiscal years, from 1973 through 2019.

Southwest Airlines encountered significant operational and financial difficulties in the 2020s, notably during the holiday meltdown in 2022 when it canceled over 15,000 flights. This event, caused by severe weather and outdated scheduling systems, led to a record $140 million fine from the U.S. Department of Transportation, and losses exceeding $1.1 billion. Elliott Investment Management, an activist hedge fund, capitalized on Southwest's vulnerabilities by acquiring more than 10% of the company's shares, advocating for leadership and operational changes to improve profitability. A settlement between Southwest and Elliott in October 2024 resulted in former CEO Gary Kelly stepping down as executive chairman and five Elliott-backed directors joining the board; however, CEO Bob Jordan remained despite Elliot's efforts to oust him. Under new oversight, Southwest initiated major changes, including its first-ever layoffs affecting approximately 15% of employees, ending its popular two free checked bags policy on May 28, 2025, transitioning to assigned seating beginning in 2026, introducing premium seating and basic fare options, adding red-eye flights, limiting flight credit validity to one year, listing flights on third-party platforms like Expedia and Google Flights, and establishing a codeshare partnership with Icelandair.

== Early history ==
=== Concept, legal challenges & certification ===
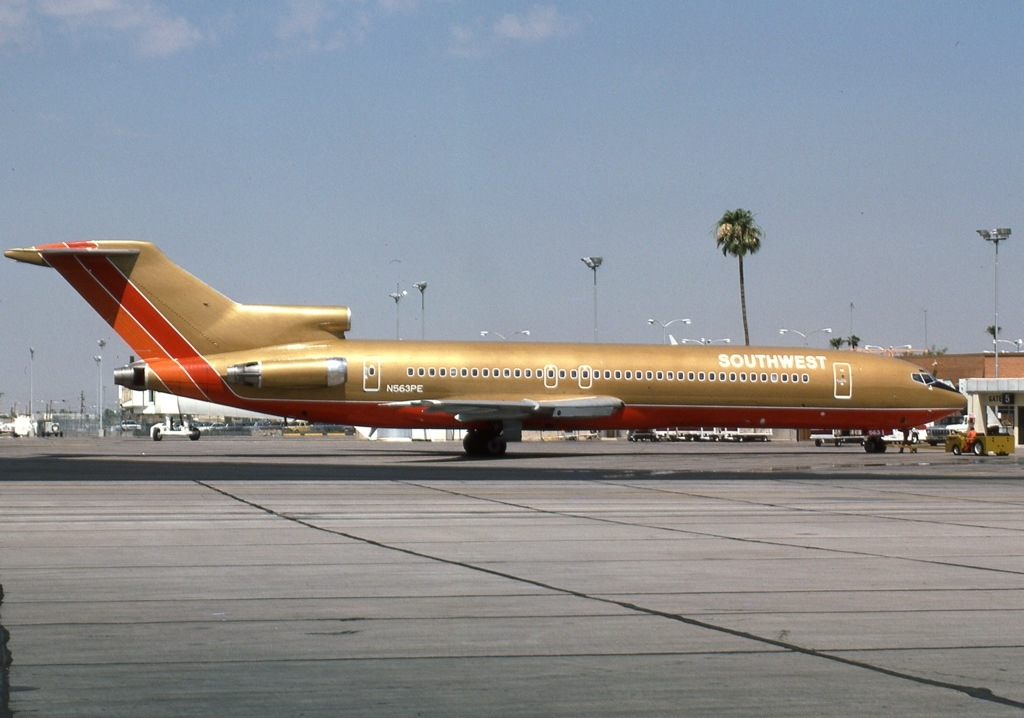
Boeing 727-200 at Phoenix Sky Harbor International Airport in 1984

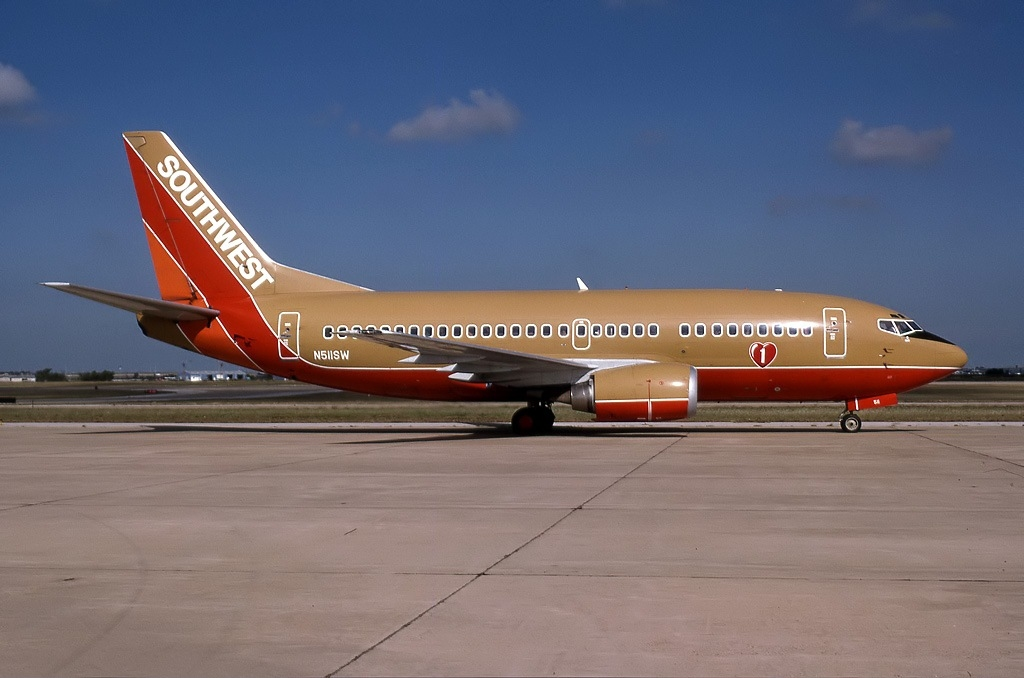
Boeing 737-500 at Amarillo in 1994

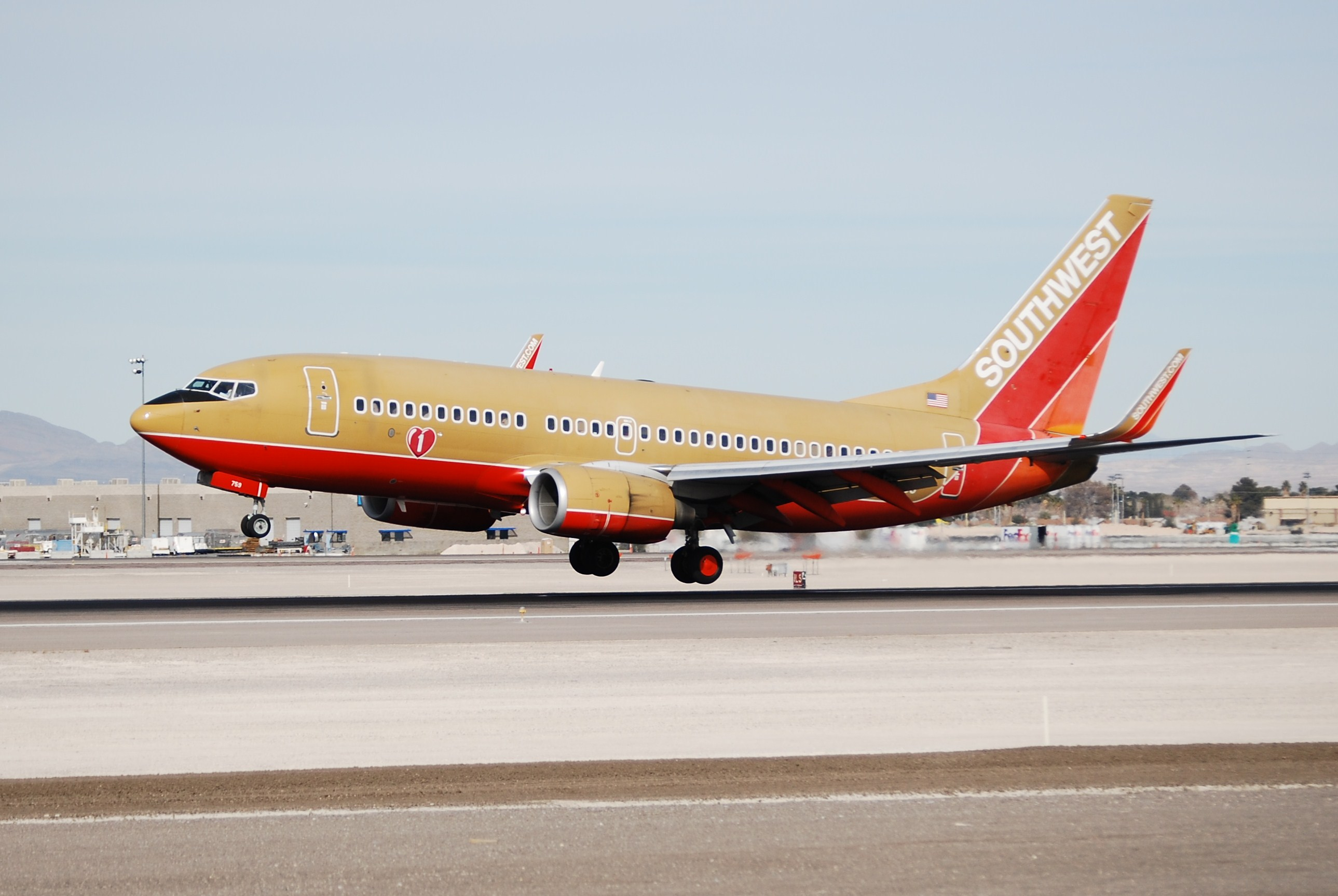
Boeing 737-700 at McCarran International Airport, Las Vegas in 2008

Southwest Airlines began with the March 15, 1967, incorporation of Air Southwest Co. in San Antonio by Rollin King and Herb Kelleher as a Texas intrastate airline. The idea was King's, with Kelleher as his lawyer.

By flying within a single state and taking other measures to not participate in interstate commerce (such as not selling tickets outside their home state), intrastate carriers could sidestep the then-tight federal airline regulations, allowing them more flexibility to enter routes and set prices and frequencies. The most successful such company was Pacific Southwest Airlines (PSA), a California intrastate airline that, according to some sources, inspired modern airlines like Southwest Airlines.

A Texas intrastate carrier had to be economically certified by the Texas Aeronautics Commission (TAC). Southwest applied to the commission in November 1967. The TAC awarded Southwest a certificate of "public convenience and necessity" on February 20, 1968. An injunction against the award was filed the next day by three competitors (Braniff, Trans-Texas Airlines, and Continental Airlines) in a Texas district court in Austin, marking the start of a legal process that would last over two years. In May 1970, the Texas Supreme Court finally ruled in favor of Southwest, and in December, the US Supreme Court refused to hear the case. The basis for the challenge was that further air service was not needed in Texas and the TAC had erred in making the award. The challenge cost Southwest $530,000 to defend, leaving the company short of money.

Early shareholders and board members included some of the Texas elite, such as Robert S. Strauss, John D. Murchison (a son of Texas oilman Clint Murchison Sr. and brother of Dallas Cowboys founder and owner Clint Murchison Jr.) and Texas rancher, oilman and industrialist Wesley West. King himself came from old money, albeit from Ohio. Kelleher, though from New Jersey, had married into one of the foremost families in San Antonio, the Negleys.

=== Startup ===
Lamar Muse was elected president and chief executive officer of the company in Jan. 1971. Muse, a Texas native, was a veteran airline executive, having been employed at five different carriers since starting his industry career in 1948, including being the CEO of Central Airlines and CEO and president of Universal Airlines. At the company, King was executive vice president for operations, Kelleher was secretary, with Muse, King, and Kelleher all on the board.

Muse immediately changed the name of the airline to Southwest Airlines, moved its headquarters to Dallas, and raised $1.25 million (of which $750,000 was from Wesley West) to replenish cash reserves depleted by Southwest's legal battles. The airline was able to begin flights by June 18 by purchasing three (plus one option) whitetail (aircraft that had been manufactured but failed to be delivered to a buyer) 737-200 aircraft from Boeing at attractive prices and with seller financing; hiring the pilot corps of the newly defunct Purdue Airlines, along with some other operating personnel; and copying operating manuals from PSA. Submitting such operating manuals to the Federal Aviation Administration (FAA) was an important prerequisite for obtaining the necessary operating authority from the FAA. PSA helped Muse and others during this period to better understand their business model, providing Southwest with a copy of their operating manuals. The other major California intrastate airline, Air California, like Southwest a 737 operator, also played a role, training Southwest's flight attendants in April 1971.

Finances were bolstered by a $7 million initial public offering in early June, with many purchases made by California residents familiar with PSA. Southwest was open about its admiration for PSA, Muse saying "We don't mind being copycats of an operation like that." Another idea taken from PSA was an emphasis on attractive flight attendants, a reflection of the mores of the time and Southwest's initial focus on the then heavily-male business market. Southwest advertised in the form of an open letter to Raquel Welch, acknowledging that the actress probably had better things to do, but asking for applications from women who were like her. 1200 applied. The first flight attendants included one of Muse's daughters.

Scheduled passenger service began on two routes: Dallas Love Field to/from Houston Intercontinental Airport and Dallas to/from San Antonio, with 12 and 6 flights a week respectively.

Unable to stop Southwest from receiving a TAC certificate, Braniff and Trans-Texas (now Texas International) argued Southwest was engaged in interstate commerce and should instead be regulated by the US Civil Aeronautics Board (CAB). When the CAB disagreed, the two competitors sued in federal court and appealed when they lost, but the appeals court said in 1972 that the competitors were disputing settled law and that "this litigation should have been terminated long ago; its undue prolongation approaches harassment." Texas International and Braniff took every legal measure and some illegal measures to block Southwest. Braniff ultimately plead nolo contendere and Texas International plead guilty to federal anti-trust charges stemming from actions the carriers took to block Southwest service. The persistent, long-running viciousness of the reaction by Texas International and Braniff to Southwest attracted widespread attention.

=== Achieving profitability ===
Southwest experienced significant losses almost immediately. The company focused on business travelers, a relatively inelastic market; its fares were lower than those of the Federally-regulated carriers, but that failed to stimulate demand. In October 1971 it took delivery of the fourth white tail 737 in order to offer hourly service on the Dallas to Houston route, increasing the financial burden further. A number of measures helped turn this around:

- Low-cost off-peak flights. Southwest had a Friday evening aircraft repositioning flight and sold it cheaply to defray the expense. The popularity of this flight grew despite no advertising, leading the company to offer low-cost off-peak (night and weekend) flights which proved extremely popular, expanding the market and aircraft utilization, driving down costs. Off-peak and Peak fares were known as "Pleasure" and "Executive" respectively—the only two fares available. A vicious fare war in early 1973 further stimulated travel. Southwest was now tapping the elastic part of the market, personal travel, and loads started to increase.
- Offloading the fourth 737 in May 1972, making a small gain on sale. This was the origin of Southwest's ten-minute aircraft turnarounds. Southwest originally allocated 25 minutes to turnaround aircraft at airports, per PSA's recommendation. To continue to offer hourly service on Dallas to Houston with three aircraft required 10 minute turnarounds. Southwest's operations personnel met this challenge, substantially increasing aircraft utilization, materially reducing costs. Fast turnarounds and high aircraft utilization were critical to Southwest's success for decades thereafter.
- Moving Houston service to Hobby Airport. All Houston airline service moved to Houston Intercontinental in 1969, but Hobby was closer to downtown, and thus more convenient for Dallas originating passengers, which at that point accounted for more than half of customers. Southwest reopened the Hobby terminal, disturbing bats in the process. Initially Southwest moved half its flights there, then all of them. While competitors made a half-hearted attempt to match Hobby service, the airline's presence at Hobby proved an enduring competitive advantage.

In 1971, Southwest lost $3.8 million. In 1972 it lost $1.6 million. In 1973, it made a profit of $175,000. From 1972 to 1973, passengers per trip (+75%) and revenue per trip (+53%) increased substantially on essentially a flat number of trips from one year to the next. Revenue per passenger was down 13% year over year, but operating cost per passenger was down far more, by 37%. Operating leverage was now working for Southwest. By the end of 1973, Southwest ordered another aircraft. Southwest would not make another annual loss until the COVID-19 pandemic ripped through the airline industry in 2020.

=== Fighting to stay in Love Field ===
Dallas/Fort Worth Regional Airport (DFW), as the airport was called in this period, had opened for commercial airline service in January 1974. Prior to the opening of DFW, all the airlines operating at Dallas Love Field agreed to move to DFW, and the cities of Dallas and Fort Worth had agreed to not permit any commercial service at any airport other than DFW once it opened. There were at least three problems:

- Southwest did not exist when the agreements were reached, so it was not a party to DFW.
- These DFW agreements were with the CAB, which had pushed for the creation of DFW. But Southwest was regulated by the TAC, not the CAB, and the TAC had authorized Southwest to fly to Love Field.
- Since Love Field had taken Federal grants, it could not discriminate among users of the airport. In late 1971, Southwest said it had no intention of leaving Love Field (because it was more convenient to Dallas, and a much more compact airport than DFW, meaning less taxi time) and was sued by the Cities of Dallas and Fort Worth. This was the start of a five year legal odyssey, which started with a Southwest win in Federal District court in 1973 on the grounds mentioned above.

The case was decided in a Federal appeals court in 1977 with the following statement: "This is the eighth time in three years that a federal court has refused to support the eviction of Southwest Airlines from Love Field."

=== Intrastate expansion and domination ===
In 1973, Southwest applied to the TAC for its first new city, Harlingen in Texas's Rio Grande Valley (RGV). The RGV, in the view of Muse, was not only intrinsically underserved, but this city would also permit one-stop flights from Harlingen to Dallas via Houston, thereby providing further support for the existing route. In late 1974, the TAC gave authorization, which was immediately challenged in court by Texas International (TI), the incumbent. However, in February 1975, TI's pilots went on strike, and the TAC gave Southwest emergency authorization to start immediately. Southwest put everything it needed in place in Harlingen over a weekend and started service almost instantly. Legal challenges to Harlingen rumbled on until October 1976, at which point Southwest had been operating the route for over a year and half. In the same month, Southwest received TAC approval for five more Texas cities: Austin, Corpus Christi, El Paso, Lubbock and Midland/Odessa. This time, legal challenges were limited to petitioning the TAC to reconsider, which it declined to do—no court cases were filed, so by January 1977, Southwest was free to start these new points.

Southwest was now not only profitable, but becoming dominant on its routes. In the year ending May 1976, Southwest's market share on its then four routes (Dallas-Houston, Dallas-San Antonio, Houston-San Antonio, Houston-Harlingen) was 73%. Moreover, market stimulation had moved Dallas-Houston from the 30th largest market in the nation to the 9th. Southwest was muscling aside far larger federally-regulated carriers off its markets. By the end of 1978, Southwest flew 13 aircraft between nine Texas cities, ending the year with an operating margin over 26%, extraordinarily high for the airline business. The impact of its 10 minute turnarounds was noted in its 1978 annual report, where it was stated that if, in 1979 (a year in which it started with 13 aircraft and ended with 19), Southwest's turnarounds were to increase from 10 to 20 minutes, the airline would require another two aircraft to fly its schedule.

=== Wright Amendment ===
After the Airline Deregulation Act was enacted in 1978, Southwest announced plans to begin interstate service in 1979 with flights to New Orleans, a proposal that was quickly endorsed by federal regulators at the CAB. However, Texas officials—particularly those from Fort Worth—thought that increased traffic at Love Field could draw flights away from DFW Airport and threaten its financial stability. Consequently, Jim Wright, member of the U.S. House of Representatives serving Fort Worth, sponsored and helped pass an amendment to the International Air Transportation Act of 1979 in Congress that restricted passenger air traffic out of Love Field in the following ways:

- Passenger service using full-size mainline airliners could only be provided to airports within Texas and its four neighbouring U.S. states: Arkansas, Louisiana, New Mexico and Oklahoma. At the time, all existing and planned Southwest routes were contained within this area, so the law had no immediate effect on the airline.
- Flights to other states were allowed only on aircraft with 56 seats or fewer, in an attempt to prohibit mainline passenger service beyond the five-state region.
- Airlines could not offer connecting flights, through service on another airline, or through ticketing beyond the five-state region.

=== Network expansion ===
Revenue passenger-kilometers, in millions
| Year | Traffic |
|---|---|
| 1975 | 480 |
| 1979 | 2,405 |
| 1985 | 8,587 |
| 1990 | 16,024 |
| 1995 | 37,535 |
| 2000 | 67,923 |
| 2005 | 97,097 |

While the Wright Amendment deterred major airlines from starting (or resuming) service out of Love Field, Southwest quickly expanded its Love Field operation by undercutting the high fares charged by legacy airlines to fly to smaller, under-served airports in the five-state region.

Southwest only flew to Dallas Love Field, Houston (first Intercontinental, then Hobby) and San Antonio until 1975 when it added Harlingen. In 1979, Southwest flew to eleven Texas cities and added its first route out of the state, Houston–New Orleans, on January 25 of that year. In 1980, Southwest expanded north to Tulsa and Oklahoma City and west to Albuquerque; in 1982, north to Kansas City and west to Phoenix, Las Vegas and California.

Flights to Denver started in 1983 (and ended in 1986), to Little Rock 1984, to St Louis and Chicago–Midway in 1985, to Nashville in 1986 and to Detroit Metro and Birmingham in 1987. Eastward expansion resumed in 1992 with Cleveland and Columbus, then Baltimore in 1993. The Pacific Northwest started in 1994 after the Morris Air acquisition; Tampa and Fort Lauderdale started in January 1996. East to Providence in 1997, Manchester in 1998, and Islip and Raleigh/Durham in 1999.

Southwest's only route within California was San Francisco–San Diego until opening operations in Oakland in 1989; in the next few years its capacity on the West Coast ballooned.

== 1980s–1990s ==
Southwest hired its first black pilot, Louis Freeman, in 1980. In 1992, he became the first black chief pilot of any major U.S. airline.

In 1981 Southwest was successfully sued for its then-existing policy of hiring only female flight attendants and ticket agents.

Southwest's Houston Pilot Base opened on June 1, 1984, its first crew base outside Dallas.

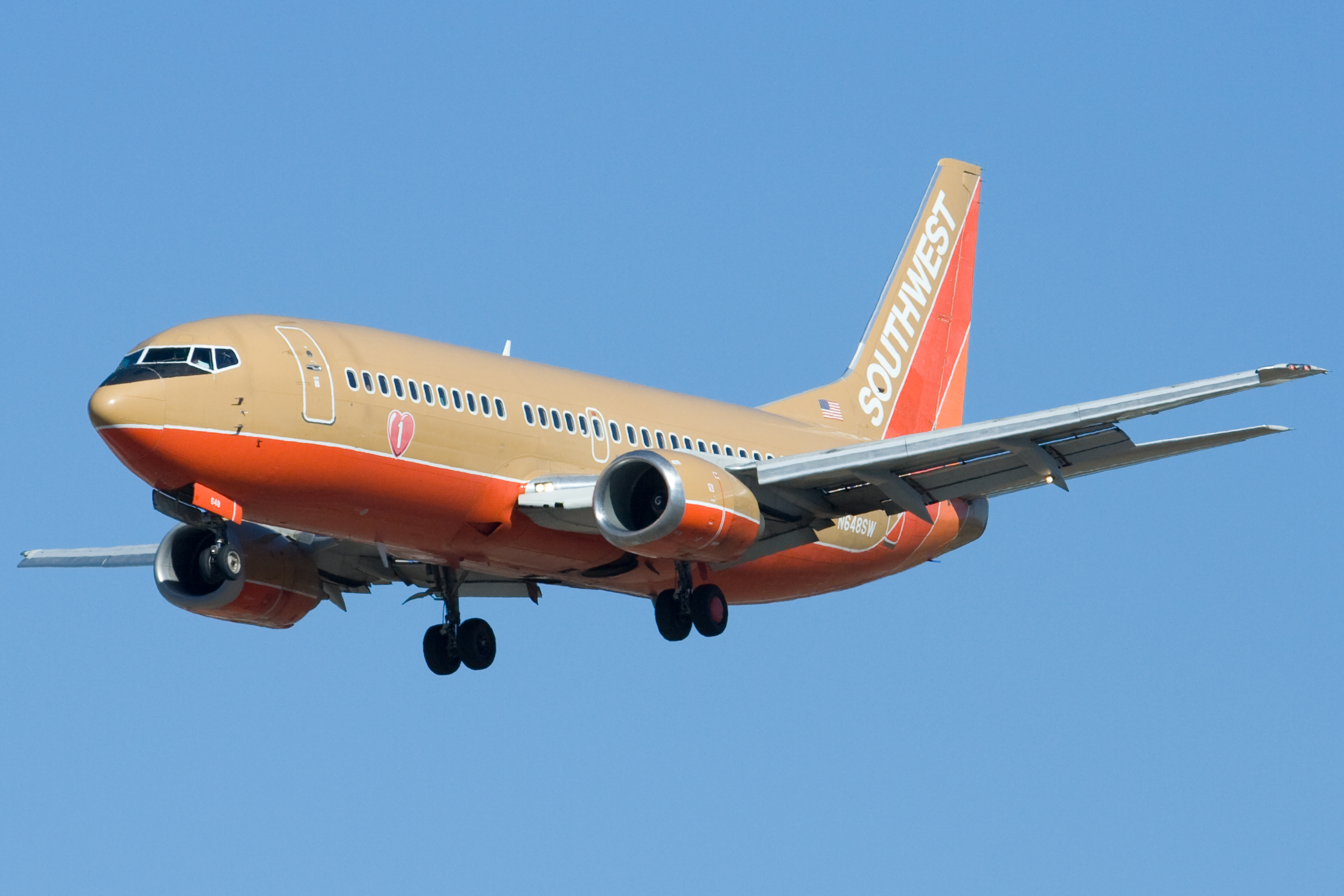
737-300 in original desert gold livery

On November 30, 1984, Southwest took delivery of its first Boeing 737-300. Southwest was a launch customer and in May 2012 was the largest operator of the type. The first 737-300 was dubbed "Kitty Hawk."

In 1985, Dallas, Fort Worth, and the DFW Airport Board attempted to block Continental Airlines from Love Field on the grounds that it offered interline through-ticketing, a service prohibited under the Wright Amendment and not offered by Southwest. However, the United States Department of Transportation (USDOT) ruled that an airline was merely disallowed from through-ticketing flight segments to or from Love Field, and that selling a passenger a separate ticket on a connecting flight at another airport—a practice known as double ticketing—was perfectly legal provided that the airline was not "advertising, promoting, or otherwise affirmatively soliciting double ticketing passengers." This ruling benefited Southwest by allowing the sale of connecting tickets from Love Field provided that such tickets were requested by travelers rather than being directly solicited by the airline or its employees. Following this ruling, a sophisticated Southwest passenger could work the system and circumvent the Wright Amendment's restrictions by flying from Dallas to another airport in the five-state region, changing planes, and then flying on a separate ticket to any city Southwest served.

Southwest paid $60.5 million in stock and cash for Muse Air when Muse was on the verge of collapse in 1985. After completing the acquisition, Southwest renamed Muse Air to Tran Star Airlines. Tran Star became a wholly owned subsidiary of Southwest and operated as an independent airline. Unwilling to compete in a fare war against Frank Lorenzo's Texas Air, Southwest eventually sold Tran Star's assets to Lorenzo in August 1987.

Southwest moved into its current headquarters in 1990. The airline had been headquartered at 3300 Love Field Dr, then in the 1820 Regal Row building in Dallas in 1979, by Love Field. At that time the headquarters had 256,000 square feet (23,800 m^{2}) of space and about 650 employees. The current headquarters facility was built at a cost of $15 million in 1990 dollars. In early 1995 the building received an additional 60,000 square feet (5,600 m^{2}) of space. As of 2006 about 1,400 employees worked in the three-story building.

In 1990 the airline registered its aircraft in Houston so it could pay aircraft taxes in Houston, even though corporate headquarters were in Dallas. Southwest was not relocating any assets, but Texas state law allowed the airline to choose Dallas or Houston as the city of registry of its aircraft.

Southwest acquired Morris Air, an airline based in Salt Lake City, Utah, in 1993, paying $134 million in stock. After completing the purchase, Southwest absorbed the capital and routes of Morris Air into Southwest's inventory and service, including Morris' Pacific Northwest destinations not previously served by Southwest. One founder of Morris Air, David Neeleman, worked with Southwest for a short period before leaving to found WestJet and then JetBlue Airways, a competing airline.

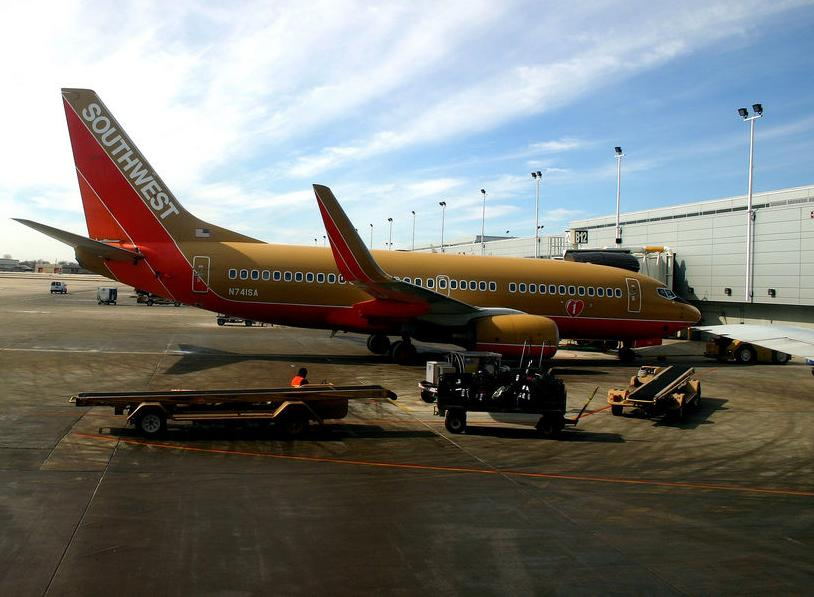
Boeing 737-700 with blended winglets at Chicago Midway International Airport in original desert gold livery

On March 16, 1995, Southwest created its first website. Originally called the "Southwest Airlines Home Gate," passengers could view schedules, a route map and company information at Iflyswa.com. Southwest.com was the number one airline website for online revenue, according to PhoCusWright. Nielsen/Netratings also reported that Southwest.com was the largest airline site in terms of unique visitors. In 2006, 70 percent of flight bookings and 73 percent of revenue was generated from bookings on southwest.com. As of June 2007, 69 percent of Southwest passengers checked in for their flights online or at a kiosk.

Southwest Airlines gained a reputation for "outside the box thinking" and proactive risk management, including the use of fuel hedging to insulate against fuel price fluctuation. Some analysts have argued against the style of profit-motivated energy trading Southwest did between 1999 and the early 2000's. They suggested that rather than hedging business risk (such as a hedge on weather to a farmer), Southwest was simply speculating on energy prices, without a formal rationale for doing so.

Southwest has enjoyed much positive press (and a strong financial boost) from its energy trading skills. However, while most analysts agree that volatility hedges can be beneficial, speculative hedges are not widely supported as a continuing strategy for profits.

In March 1996, after the Dallas City Council unanimously voted to allow construction, the airline began to build a 300,000 square feet (28,000 m^{2}) addition to the existing corporate headquarters at a cost of $30 million in 1996 dollars. This occurred after Thursday, March 14, 1996, the airline leased two tracts of land, a total of 10 acres (4.0 ha), from the City of Dallas to build a new pilot training facility, a headquarters expansion, and more parking space. A $9.8 million pilot training facility was built on a 5 acres (2.0 ha) plot of land owned by the city of Dallas; it was scheduled to be completed in the Spring of 1997. With the new training facility built, the old one would be removed, and the company would expand its headquarters building on the training facility site. 120,000 square feet (11,000 m^{2}) of headquarters space was added, at a price of $16 million including fixtures, making a total of 436,000 square feet (40,500 m^{2}). The airline also leased 4.8 acres (1.9 ha) from the city of Dallas for more parking; 700 spaces were added to the existing 1,200. After the expansion Southwest had a total leasehold of about 24 acres (9.7 ha), including its headquarters, training facilities and parking. By the end of 1997 the expansion of Love Field facilities and several terminal improvements were expected to cost Southwest $47 million.

In 1997, Southwest and Icelandair entered into interline and marketing agreements allowing for joint fares, coordinated schedules, transfer of passenger luggage between the two airlines in Baltimore and a place connecting passengers between several U.S. cities and several European cities. The frequent flyer programs were not included in the agreement.

== 2000s ==
=== Repealing the Wright Amendment ===
In 1996, startup carrier Legend Airlines proposed to start long-range flights from Love Field using McDonnell Douglas DC-9s refitted with 56 seats, the maximum allowed under the Wright Amendment. However, the USDOT ruled in September 1996 that the 56-seat restriction applied to the "designed capacity" of an airliner rather than to the number of seats actually installed, prompting Legend to seek to change the law. By July 1997, Legend had enlisted the help of Senator Richard Shelby of Alabama. In October 1997, the United States Senate passed a funding bill that included the Shelby Amendment, allowing unrestricted flights to Alabama, Kansas, and Mississippi and nationwide flights using larger aircraft reconfigured with 56 seats. Southwest did not add flights to the new states, citing a lack of demand. However, other airlines were prompted to challenge Southwest at Love Field; the first was Continental Express, which began flights between Love Field and George Bush Intercontinental Airport in Houston in June 1998, and announced its intention to launch interstate flights once legal and regulatory obstacles were overcome.

On April 5, 2000, Legend Airlines inaugurated the first 56-seat long-haul service from Love Field to destinations beyond the Wright and Shelby Amendment regions. By July 2000, it had been joined by American Airlines, Continental Express and Delta Air Lines regional affiliate Atlantic Southeast Airlines. Industry observers predicted that competing airlines' regional jet service at Love Field would continue, but Southwest—which did not operate 56-seat aircraft—could not offer competing service because the Legend-backed Shelby Amendment had left the 56-seat long-haul restriction in place.

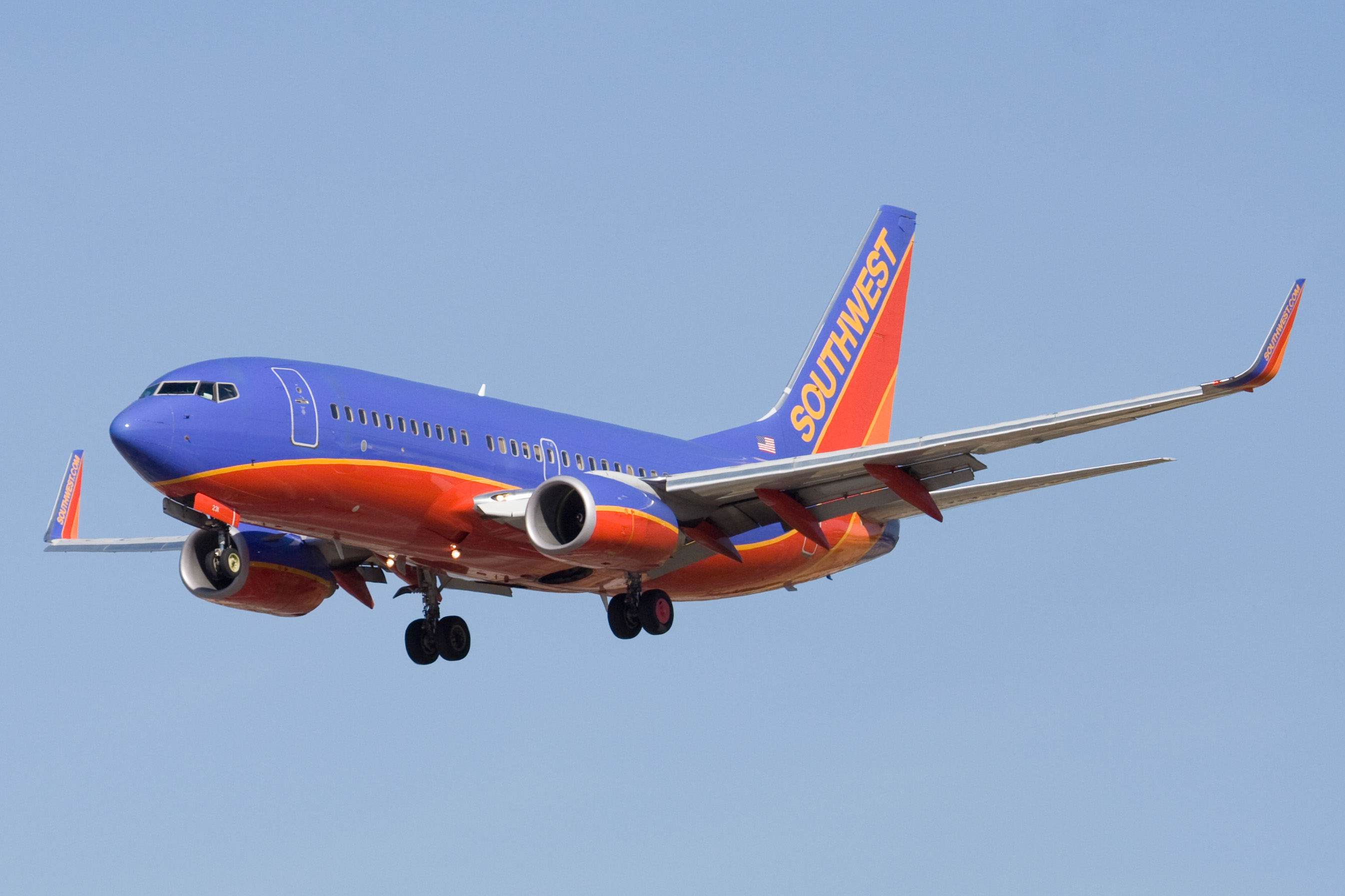
A Southwest Airlines Boeing 737-700 landing at San Jose International Airport.

In late 2004, Southwest began actively seeking the full repeal of the Wright Amendment restrictions. In late 2005, Missouri was added to the list of permissible destination states via a transportation appropriations bill. New service from Love Field to Saint Louis, Missouri and Kansas City, Missouri quickly started in December 2005.

In June 2006, Southwest executed an agreement together with Dallas, Fort Worth, DFW Airport, and American Airlines, and announced the parties' mutual support for the repeal of the Wright Amendment. The agreement permanently capped the number of gates at Love Field at 20 and gave American and Southwest preferential leases to the remaining gates. The agreement also prohibited international passenger flights from Dallas-area airports other than DFW, and stipulated that Southwest Airlines would lose gates at Love Field if it or a codeshare agreement partner offered flights from any airport within an 80-mile (130 km) radius (which encompasses DFW), but these provisions would expire on January 1, 2025.

Both the U.S. Senate and House of Representatives passed Wright-related legislation on September 29, 2006, and it was signed into law by President George W. Bush on October 13, 2006. The new law became effective on October 16, 2006, when the FAA Administrator notified Congress that any new aviation operations occurring as a result of the new law could be accommodated without adverse effect to the airspace.

Southwest started selling tickets under the new law on October 19, 2006. Highlights of the agreement are the immediate elimination of through-ticketing prohibitions and unrestricted flights to domestic destinations eight years after the legislation takes effect. Because of the agreement, nationwide service became possible for Southwest; the law also defined the maximum number of gates at Love Field. Southwest controlled all but four of the Love Field gates. United Airlines controlled two and American Airlines was initially supposed to operate from the other two, however, because of American's merger with US Airways, it had to give up the two gates at DAL. Virgin America began leasing the two gates from American on October 13, 2014. The formal end of the Wright Amendment was marked by the arrival of Southwest Airlines Flight 1013 from Denver to Love Field at 7:51 am that day.

Southwest remains the dominant passenger airline at Love Field, maintains its headquarters, hangars, training centers and flight simulators adjacent thereto and reflects its ties to Love Field in its winged heart livery and its stock exchange ticker symbol (LUV).

=== 2000–2009 ===
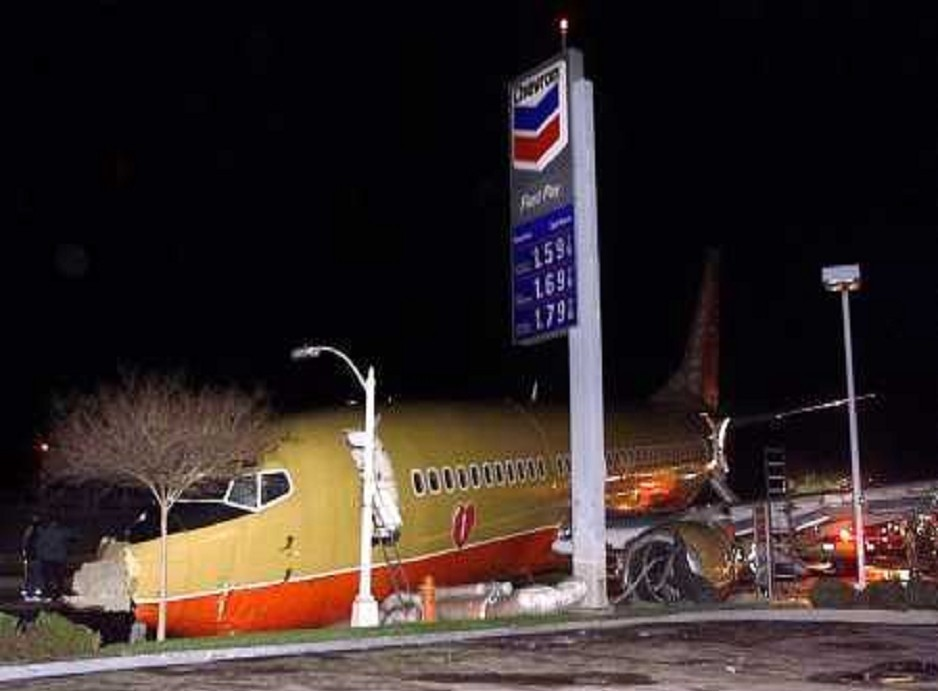
The wreck of Flight 1455 in Burbank, California

On March 5, 2000, Southwest Airlines Flight 1455, a Boeing 737-3T5, registration N668SW, carrying 137 passengers and 5 crew, overran the runway at Burbank-Glendale-Pasadena Airport, Burbank, California, skidding across a city street and coming to rest at a Chevron gas station. 2 passengers suffered serious injuries, while the captain and 41 passengers suffered minor injuries; the aircraft was badly damaged and was written off. This was the first major accident in the airline's 29-year history. The accident was attributed to pilot error, with the pilots having landed at an excessive airspeed; a contributing factor was air traffic control error.

Southwest's codeshare arrangement with Icelandair was terminated when that airline's service from Baltimore to Keflavík International Airport ended in January 2007.

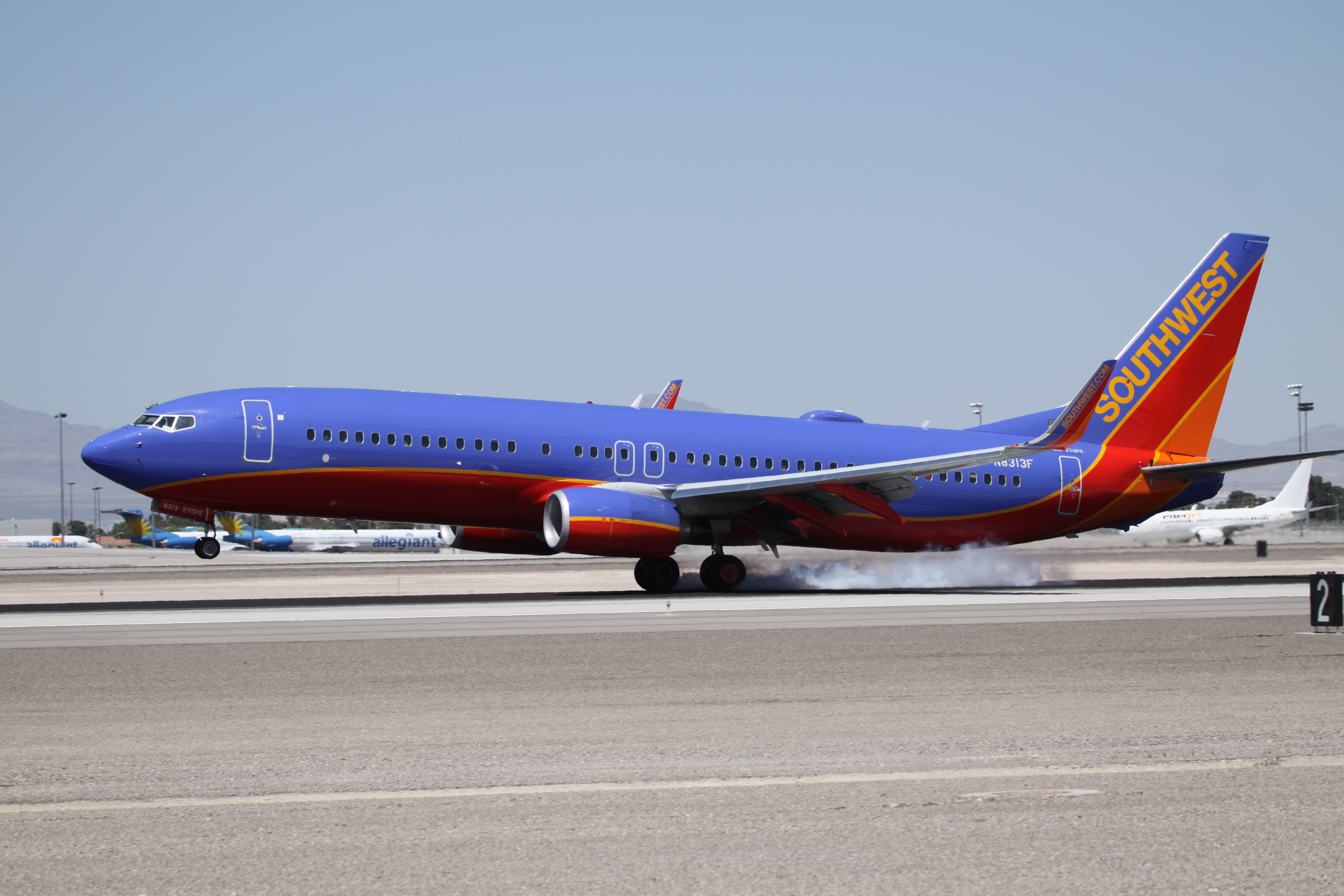
Southwest Airlines Boeing 737-800 touches down at Las Vegas

In 2008, Southwest contracted with Pratt and Whitney to supply the proprietary Ecopower water pressure-washing system, which allows Southwest to clean grime and contaminants off engine turbine blades while the aircraft is parked at the gate. Frequent use of the Ecopower system is estimated to improve fuel efficiency by about 1.9%.

Southwest paid $7.5 million to acquire certain assets from bankrupt ATA Airlines in 2008. Southwest's primary reason for making the purchase was to acquire the operating certificate and landing slots at New York's LaGuardia Airport formerly controlled by ATA. While some preferential hiring was indicated at the time of the purchase, the transaction ultimately did not include the purchase of any aircraft, facilities or transfers of employees directly from ATA. At the time of ATA's demise in April 2008, the airline offered over 70 flights a week to Hawaii from Southwest's focus cities in PHX, LAS, LAX and OAK with connections available to many other cities across the United States. The ATA/Southwest codeshare was terminated when ATA filed for Chapter 11 bankruptcy on April 3, 2008.

On March 6, 2008, Federal Aviation Administration (FAA) inspectors submitted documents to the United States Congress, alleging that Southwest allowed 117 of its aircraft to fly carrying passengers despite the fact that they were "not airworthy" according to air safety investigators. In some cases the aircraft were allowed to fly for up to 30 months after the inspection deadlines had passed, rendering them unfit to fly. Records indicate that thousands of passengers were flown on aircraft deemed unsafe by federal standards. Southwest declined comment at the time and U.S. Representative James Oberstar advised a hearing would be held.

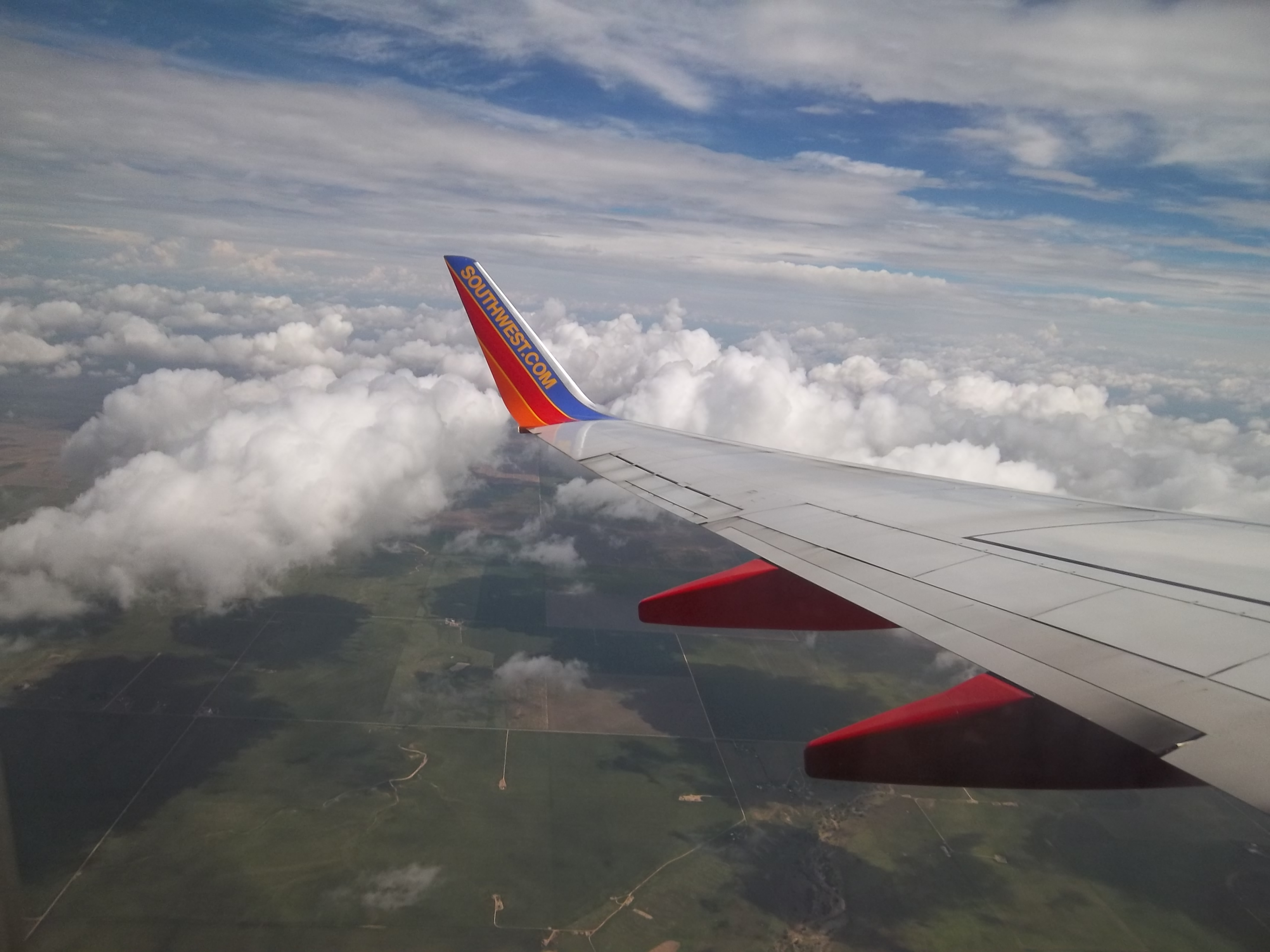
A Southwest Airlines Boeing 737-700 with blended wingtips departing Denver, CO.

On March 12, 2008, Southwest Airlines voluntarily grounded 44 aircraft to check if they needed further inspection. The FAA claimed that Southwest Airlines flew almost 60,000 flights without fuselage inspections taking place. Southwest Airlines faced a $10.2 million fine if found to have violated FAA regulations. There have also been rumors that the FAA knew about Southwest Airlines' violations but decided not to fine the airline because it would disrupt the airline's services. On March 2, 2009, Southwest settled these claims, agreeing to pay the FAA fines of $7.5 million for these safety and maintenance issues. The original fine of $30.2 million – a sum that would have been the largest fine in the agency's history – was lowered after a year of negotiations. The FAA gave Southwest two years in which to pay the fine.

On July 8, 2008, Southwest Airlines signed a codeshare agreement with WestJet of Canada, giving the two airlines the ability to sell seats on each other's flights. Originally, the partnership was to be finalized by late 2009, but had been postponed due to economic conditions. On April 16, 2010, Southwest and WestJet airlines amicably agreed to terminate the implementation of a codeshare agreement between the two airlines.

On July 30, 2009, Southwest Airlines made a $113.6 million bid for bankrupt Frontier Airlines Holdings, the parent company of Frontier Airlines. Southwest planned to initially operate Frontier as a stand-alone carrier, eventually absorbing the airline and replacing Frontier's aircraft with Boeing 737s. Less than one month after submitting its bid, Southwest learned on August 14 that it had lost the initial bidding to Republic Airways Holdings and elected not to counter or pursue the deal further. Southwest stated that its requirement for pilots' unions at both companies to reach a negotiated (not arbitrated) agreement as a condition of acquisition was a key factor in its abandonment of its bid.

Southwest signed its second international codeshare agreement on November 10, 2008, with Mexican low-cost carrier Volaris. The agreement allowed Southwest to sell tickets on Volaris flights.

On August 26, 2009, the FAA investigated Southwest for installing improper parts on about 10% of its jets. The work was performed by an outside maintenance company. The FAA stated that the parts do not present a safety danger, and the airline was never formally charged by the FAA, but they were given until December 24, 2009 to replace the parts with those that were FAA-approved.

== 2010s ==
=== AirTran Airways acquisition ===
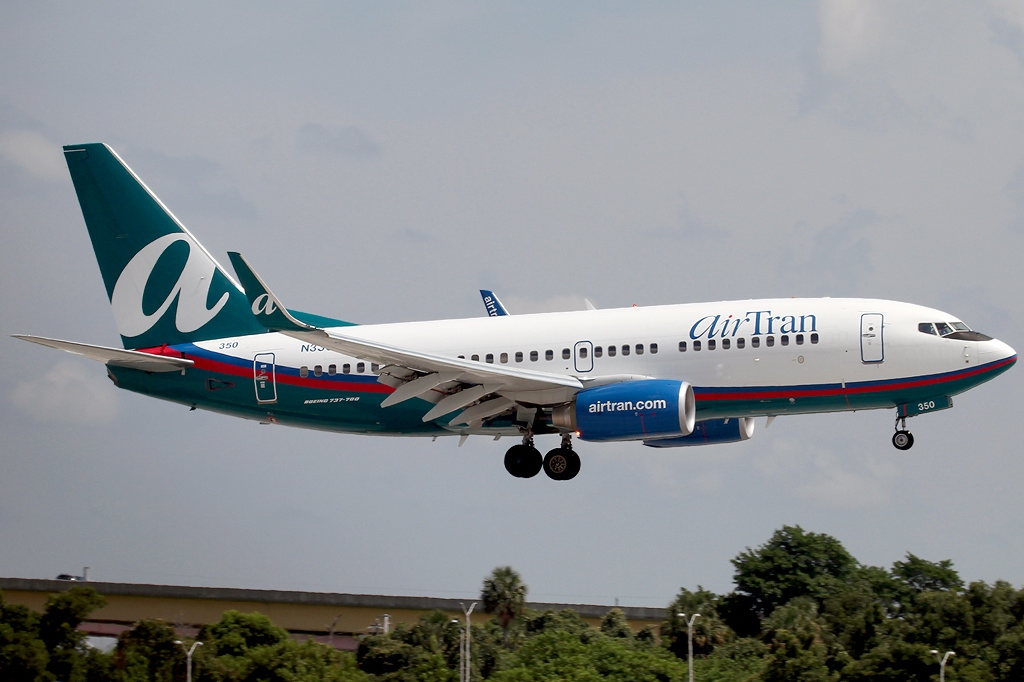
An AirTran Airways Boeing 737-700 landing at Fort Lauderdale–Hollywood International Airport

Southwest Airlines first announced the acquisition on September 27, 2010, and received final approval from the United States Department of Justice on April 27, 2011. On May 2, 2011, Southwest Airlines completed the acquisition of AirTran Airways by purchasing all of the outstanding common stock, corporate identity and operating assets of AirTran Holdings, Inc., the former parent company of AirTran Airways. Southwest Airlines estimated the transaction's value at $3.2 billion and onetime costs to integrate the two airlines of $500 million, with cost synergies of approximately $400 million annually. The greatest impact on Southwest, access to Atlanta, international service and the addition of landing slots at New York-LaGuardia Airport and Washington-Reagan Airport. Southwest obtained a single operating certificate (SOC) from the United States Federal Aviation Administration on March 1, 2012, but the airline was not fully integrated until AirTran had its last flight on December 28, 2014.

An entity called Guadeloupe Holdings was formed by Southwest to act as a wholly owned subsidiary of Southwest Airlines and holding company for AirTran's operations and assets. Southwest's organized labor groups ceded contractual "scope" provisions pending acceptable negotiated seniority integration agreements. Southwest transitioned aircraft, routes and employees from AirTran to Southwest on a one-by-one basis until all parts of AirTran were integrated to Southwest.

The purchase added 25 additional destinations previously not served by Southwest including cities in the Caribbean and Boston, Massachusetts, an AirTran hub and the largest U.S. city not served by Southwest at that time. On October 10, 2011, USA Today reported that Southwest would work to no longer bank flights in Atlanta as AirTran did.

On February 14, 2013, Southwest began codesharing with AirTran. It took the first step on January 26, 2013, by launching shared itineraries in five markets. Southwest continued to launch shared itineraries with 39 more markets beginning February 25, 2013. In April 2013, shared itineraries were expanded to all Southwest and AirTran cities (domestic and international). The airlines were fully integrated on December 29, 2014.

=== 2010–2019 ===
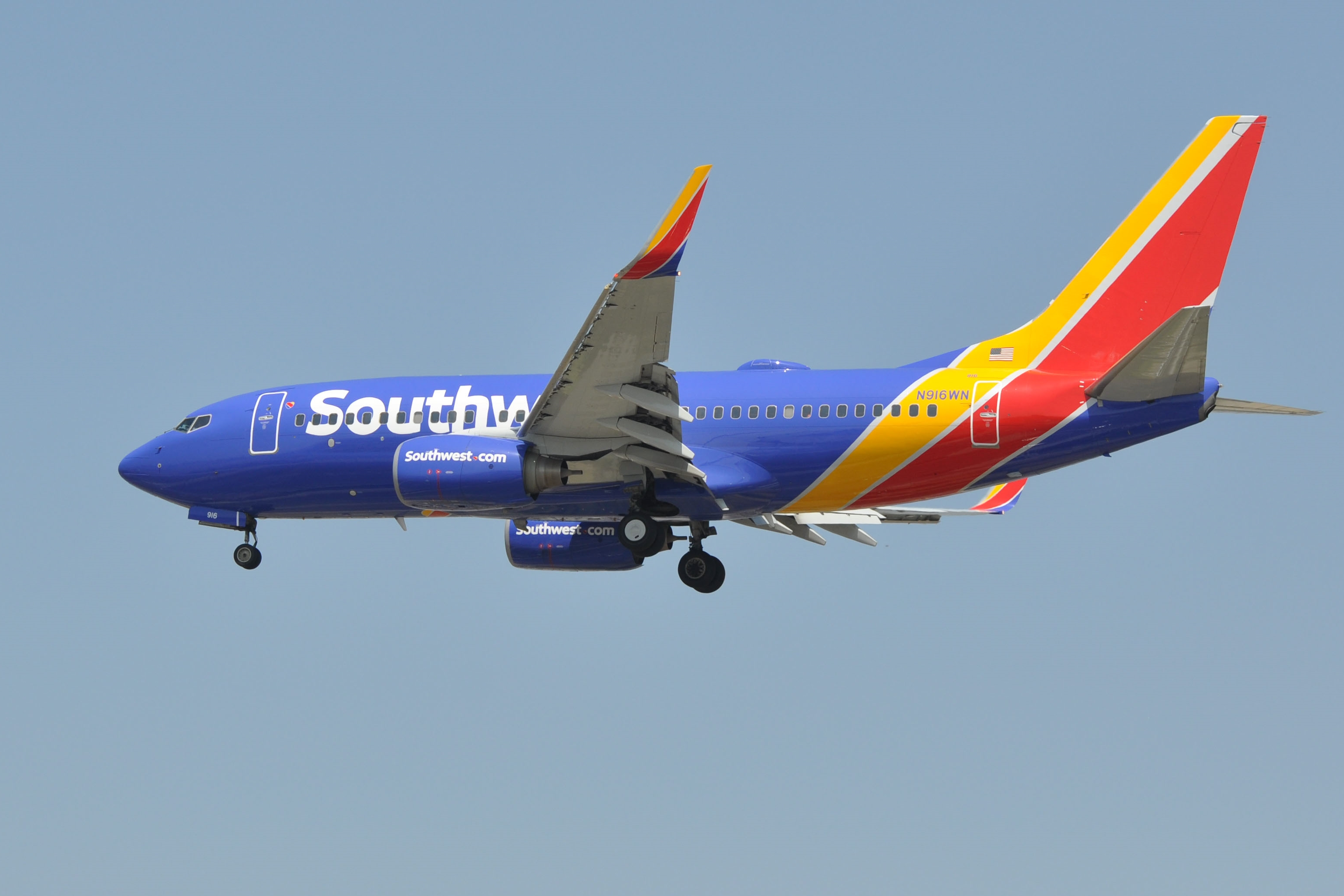
Southwest 737-700 on final at LAX

For the tenth year in a row, Fortune magazine recognized Southwest Airlines in its annual survey of corporate reputations. Among all industries in 2004, Fortune has listed Southwest Airlines as number three among America's Top Ten most admired corporations.

On December 13, 2011, Southwest placed a firm order for 150 Boeing 737 MAX aircraft, becoming the launch customer for the type. The first 737 MAX Aircraft was delivered to Southwest on August 29, 2017, with their first revenue service began on October 1.

In January 2012, Southwest Airlines expressed interest in serving Mexican- and South American destinations out of Houston's William P. Hobby Airport. On May 30, 2012, Houston's city council approved Southwest's request for international flights from Hobby. Southwest agreed to invest at least $100 million to cover all costs tied to the Hobby upgrade, which included designing and building five new gates and a customs facility. Construction at Hobby took two years, with international flights beginning in October 2015.

On April 11, 2012, Southwest introduced the 737-800 to the fleet. It seats 175 passengers as compared to the regular 143-seater 737-700. The first 737-800 was called "Warrior One" in salute of the Southwest Employees’ Warrior Spirit.

On February 22, 2013, the connecting agreement with Volaris was terminated. It was said to be mutual between the airlines. Most industry experts believe that the expansion of the subsidiary of Southwest, AirTran Airways, into more Mexican markets, was a main reason for the termination of the agreement.

On May 5, 2014, Southwest announced that it had chosen Amadeus IT Group to replace its current domestic reservation system. Southwest already operated its international reservation system with Amadeus. The new domestic reservation system was expected to take a few years to be fully implemented. When completed, Southwest will operate one reservation system by Amadeus.

In September 2014, Southwest introduced new branding, including a new livery and logo.

On October 13, 2014, the Wright Amendment restrictions at Dallas Love Field were repealed and Southwest expanded service at Love Field to include cities outside the previous location restrictions.

Throughout 2014, Southwest expanded service at Reagan-National in Washington D.C. and LaGuardia Airport in New York City through slot acquisitions from the American Airlines/US Airways merger.

On June 10, 2016, Southwest received approval to begin flights to Cuba. Southwest was one of six airlines chosen by the USDOT to commence scheduled service to Cuba. Southwest launched service from Fort Lauderdale–Hollywood International Airport to Varadero, Cuba and Santa Clara, Cuba.

In July 2016, an operational outage caused by technology problems cancelled hundreds of Southwest flights, stranding tens of thousands of passengers and many aircrew.

On April 17, 2018, Southwest Airlines Flight 1380, one person was killed after an engine failure on a Southwest Airlines flight from New York to Dallas. The engine exploded on the Boeing 737-700 and sent shrapnel flying back towards the passenger window, breaking it. The passenger was partially sucked out through the broken window as an uncontrolled decompression ensued. While other passengers managed to pull the passenger out of the window, she ultimately died from her injuries. This death was the first in-flight fatality due to an accident in the history of Southwest.

On March 13, 2019, the FAA grounded all 737 MAX aircraft following the discovery of evidence suggesting a common cause for the crashes of Lion Air Flight 610 on October 29, 2018, and Ethiopian Airlines Flight 302 on March 10, 2019. The 737 MAX 8 constituted about 5 percent of the Southwest fleet at the time, and the airline offered to rebook travelers' previously scheduled MAX 8 flights on other aircraft without charging additional fees or fare differences. On October 17, 2019, the airline stated that it was expecting the MAX 8 to remain grounded until at least February 8, 2020, forcing the preemptive cancellation of roughly 175 flights per weekday.

== 2020s ==
=== 2020-2022: COVID-19 and 737 MAX crisis ===
In January 2020, the Wall Street Journal reported the United States Department of Transportation was working on an investigation that found Southwest flew more than 17 million passengers on planes with unconfirmed maintenance records over two years and that the FAA had allowed Southwest to fly aircraft with unresolved safety concerns.

In March 2020, the COVID-19 pandemic had a severe impact on Southwest operations, as a 92% drop in United States air travel compared to March 2019 prompted the airline to cancel 1,500 daily flights constituting about 40% of its schedule. In March 2020, Southwest Airlines had stored 50 737-700 aircraft at Southern California Logistics Airport, adding to the 34 grounded 737 MAX jets already in storage. By April 7, it became clear that summer travel was being adversely affected, and the airline suspended close to 50% of it flight schedule through June 27. On April 14, Southwest finalized a deal to receive congressional relief funding consisting of $2.3 billion in grants and a $1 billion low-interest loan.

In April 2020, the month when COVID-19 was declared a pandemic in the nation, Southwest immediately suspended relatively fewer flights than other major airlines, becoming the world's largest airline measured by operational seat capacity. By April 28, Southwest had parked 350 of its 742 aircraft, negotiated the delay of many anticipated Boeing 737 MAX deliveries, and was reporting daily losses of at least $30 million.

In July 2020, around one-third of Southwest's employees had expressed interest taking early retirement or long-term leave, and the company launched voluntary separation and extended time off initiatives; over 16,800 employees signed up for the programs. On October 5, 2020, chief executive officer (CEO) Gary C. Kelly announced pay cuts for non-union employees and senior management starting in 2021 to avert furloughs, and stated that Southwest would negotiate with its pilot and flight attendant unions for similar cuts, although the unions expressed opposition. On November 6, 2020, citing ongoing pandemic-related losses and stalled negotiations with the unions, Southwest issued WARN Act notices to 42 employees—the first time in company history that the airline had formally threatened to furlough an employee. On November 18, another 402 WARN notices were issued to mechanics. However, the Consolidated Appropriations Act, 2021 was enacted on December 27, 2020, providing $15 billion in airline aid, and Southwest rescinded the furlough notices and pay cuts.

Amid the upheaval in the airline industry due to the coronavirus, Southwest sought to challenge the larger airlines by expanding into their hub airports and increasing service to vacation-oriented destinations in 2021. Southwest announced it would expand its footholds in the Houston and Chicago markets, supplementing its hubs at Hobby and Midway with service to Bush Airport in Houston (a United hub) and O'Hare Airport in Chicago (a hub for United and American Airlines). The return to Bush is the first time Southwest has served the airport since it pulled out in 2005, and the entry into O'Hare is the first time it has ever served the larger Chicago airport. Southwest also began service at Miami International Airport, an American Airlines hub. It also announced service to three Colorado ski cities and several southern destinations for a total of ten new destinations in 2021.

In October 2020, Southwest announced that it was considering the Airbus A220 as an alternative to the MAX 7 to replace its 737-700's, with deliveries from 2025. However, in March 2021 Southwest announced an order for 100 MAX 7 jets with deliveries from 2022 and said that negotiations with Airbus were never initiated.

In November 2020, the FAA formally ended the 737 MAX grounding, and Southwest began the process of returning its 34 737 MAX aircraft to service and retraining all of its pilots. On March 11, 2021, Southwest resumed 737 MAX operation, becoming the fourth US airline to do so.

Southwest posted a $3.1 billion loss for fiscal year 2020, the first time the airline had not turned an annual profit since 1972.

In the post-COVID era, Southwest moved away from its long-standing marketing strategy of primarily serving smaller airports in major urban areas, starting service to O'Hare International Airport, Miami International Airport, and George Bush Intercontinental Airport, despite already serving smaller airports in those markets (Midway International Airport, Fort Lauderdale–Hollywood International Airport, and Houston Hobby Airport respectively).

On June 23, 2021, Gary Kelly announced he would retire as CEO in February 2022, and Bob Jordan would take his place. Kelly said he would remain as executive chairman of the board until at least 2026.

=== 2022 meltdown ===
On December 26, 2022, the airline cancelled around 70% of their scheduled flights due to the Late December 2022 North American winter storm. Although the weather eased, further flights were cancelled on the following days. Some impacted passengers were unable to contact the airline and were left stranded without their luggage, prompting a response from the United States Department of Transportation. On December 28, the airline cancelled more flights for an extended period as a result of damage to its operational systems.

=== 2022–2024: corporate shakeup ===
In November 2023, Southwest Airlines and DFW Airport confirmed preliminary talks aimed at starting Southwest service there after the provision requiring the airline to give up Love Field gates expires in 2025.

Southwest lost $219 million in the fourth quarter of 2023 and $231 million in the first quarter of 2024, and in April 2024, it said it would limit hiring and stop flying to Bellingham International Airport, Cozumel International Airport, George Bush Intercontinental Airport, and Syracuse Hancock International Airport. In May 2024, Southwest Airlines fares started showing on Google for the first time after long being excluded from the search engine's search results. Two months later, Southwest announced that it would soon be ending its long-standing open seating policy. The airline will begin assigning seats, introduce premium seating options, and launch overnight flights in 2026.

In June 2024, Elliott Investment Management, an activist investment fund, announced that it had taken a $1.9 billion position in Southwest and would seek to oust leadership at the carrier, arguing it had "failed to evolve" citing "leadership’s stubborn unwillingness to evolve the Company’s strategy." The fund launched a website, StrongerSouthwest.com, with a letter for shareholders arguing in favor of its changes. In September, it was revealed that Elliot had amassed over 10% of common stock in Southwest, entitling it to call a special meeting of shareholders if its demands are not met. Elliott demanded the ouster of Gary Kelly and Bob Jordan, blaming the pair for the recent sharp decrease in the value of Southwest stock.

The day after a meeting with Elliott, Southwest announced on September 10 that six of the airline's board members would resign at the November 21 quarterly board meeting, and Kelly would not seek reelection as executive chairman at the spring 2025 annual shareholder meeting. Jordan was expected to remain as CEO.

In November 2024, five of Elliot's nominees were seated on Southwest’s board—the largest number of board seats ever gained by Elliott in a settlement with a U.S. company—and Kelly retired early. Southwest simultaneously promoted industry veteran Rakesh Gangwal, had been appointed to the board in July 2024, to chair of the board. Gangwal is co-founder of India's largest airline IndiGo and a former senior executive at United Airlines and US Airways.
