= Colleen Barrett =

American business executive (1944–2024)

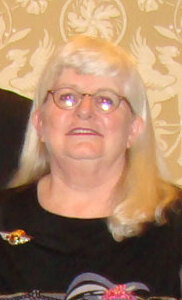
- Barrett in 2008

President Emerita of Southwest Airlines
- In office 2008–2024
- Preceded by: Position created
- Succeeded by: Vacant

President of Southwest Airlines
- In office 2001–2008
- Preceded by: Herb Kelleher
- Succeeded by: Gary C. Kelly

Personal details
- Born: Colleen Crotty; September 14, 1944 Bellows Falls, Vermont, U.S.
- Died: May 8, 2024 (aged 79)
- Education: Becker Junior College (Associate degree)

Colleen Barrett (née Crotty; September 14, 1944 – May 8, 2024) was an American business executive who served as president, and later president emerita, of Southwest Airlines. She was an influential figure in the founding and development of the company. In 2001, she became the first woman to serve as president of a major airline.

== Personal life ==
Colleen Crotty was born on September 14, 1944, to a lower-income family in Bellows Falls, Vermont. She attended the Worcester campus of Becker Junior College on a government loan, where she graduated in 1964 with a two-year degree to become a legal secretary. In 2015, she donated US$1 million to her alma mater for the founding of a center for innovation and entrepreneurship. The center opened in April 2018.

She married Allen J. Barrett in 1965. Soon after they were married, Allen was drafted into the United States Air Force. He was deployed while Barrett was pregnant. In 1967, the family moved to San Antonio, Texas, where Barrett's husband was stationed. Barrett was the mother of one son, Patrick. The couple divorced in 1972, leaving her to be the main caregiver of her son. While president of Southwest Airlines, Barrett was diagnosed with breast cancer, which was successfully treated with surgery and radiation treatment.

Barrett was a devout Catholic and cited her faith as a major influence on her leadership style and career.

== Career ==
=== Legal secretary ===
In 1968, several years after graduating from Becker, Barrett got a job as a legal secretary working for Herb Kelleher when he was a young lawyer at Wilbur Matthews' law firm in San Antonio. Kelleher had a reputation as a skilled, but chronically disorganized lawyer, whose office was in such disarray that a night guard at the firm once called the police assuming a break-in had occurred. Barrett's first duty was to set up a filing system to organize ten years-worth of his case files. She grew to play a pivotal role in keeping Kelleher organized, setting him up for his eventual success as both a lawyer and businessman over their 51-year working relationship. Despite the title of secretary, Barrett was treated as an equal and trusted advisor who regularly joined Kelleher in court. When Kelleher left Matthews' law firm to help found the law firm of Oppenheimer, Rosenberg, Kelleher & Wheatley in 1970, Barrett moved with him.

In 1967, Kelleher had met with Rollin King, who had pitched the initial business plan for Southwest Airlines and the two had begun their efforts to begin the company. Kelleher's role was largely focused on serving as legal counsel to the new airline during the many early court battles the airline faced before beginning service. Barrett was closely involved with every step of the legal process. After four years of court battles they succeeded and the first Southwest Airlines flight finally took off June 18, 1971. For the first seven years of operation, Kelleher and Barrett supported Southwest through continued legal support as Kelleher remained an active lawyer, though also with a seat on the Southwest board. However, after a leadership restructure in 1978, Kelleher became chairman of the board and temporary CEO (becoming full-time CEO in 1981). Kelleher brought Barrett with him once again and she remained his secretary and advisor. When they transitioned to Southwest full-time, they both took a leave of absence from the Oppenheimer law firm that technically was never cancelled for the remainder of their careers.

=== Early leadership at Southwest ===
Barrett's level of authority at the airline quickly grew. At first, this authority came simply from the high level influence she had with Kelleher as his secretary, though she eventually gained more formal recognition as Vice President of Administration in 1986 and a position on the Executive Planning Committee. She was promoted to Executive Vice President of Customers in 1990. Barrett described her transition to true leadership as a gradual process, and for several years even after she had been promoted beyond an assistant to Kelleher she had to occasionally remind board members and other senior leaders at the company that she was a distinct leader and not "just a parrot of what Herb thinks". Despite Kelleher's role as the more public face of the company, employees universally referred to "Herb and Colleen" together as the leaders of the company.

Barrett had been credited with helping fundamentally shape Southwest's customer service strategy, employee culture, and leadership philosophy. She is commonly referred to as the airline industry's "Queen of Hearts" for her focus on corporate values and service. During her time in leadership she made an effort to personally respond to correspondence from every customer who wrote to the company. She also contributed to the airline's fuel hedging strategy.

=== President of Southwest ===
In March 2001, Kelleher, who had been serving as Chairman, CEO, and President, retired from the latter two positions, passing the CEO role to James Parker and the president role to Barrett, who was also made chief operating officer. With this promotion, she became the first and then-only woman to hold the office of president at a major airline, and the highest ranking woman in the world of aviation.

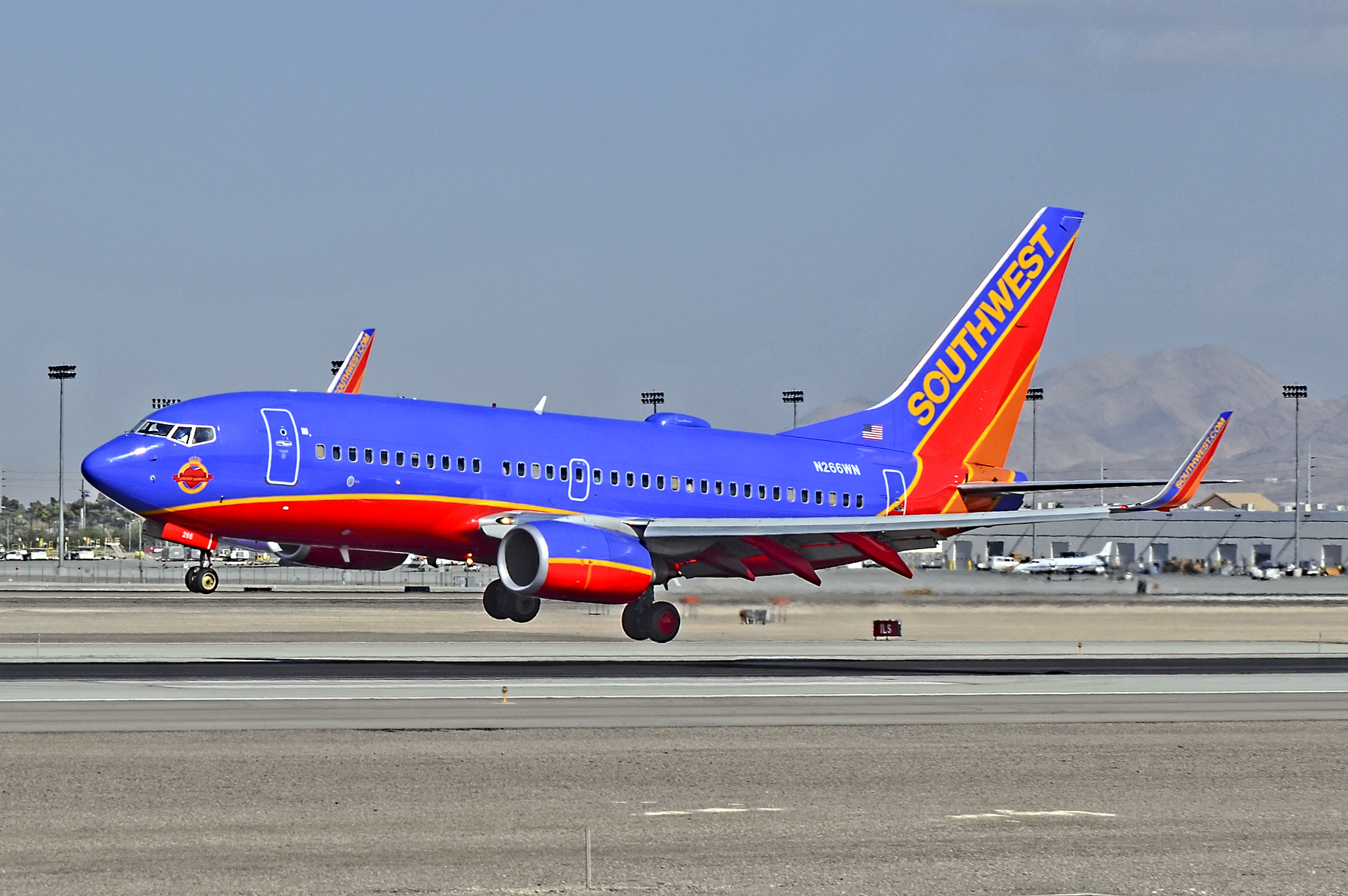
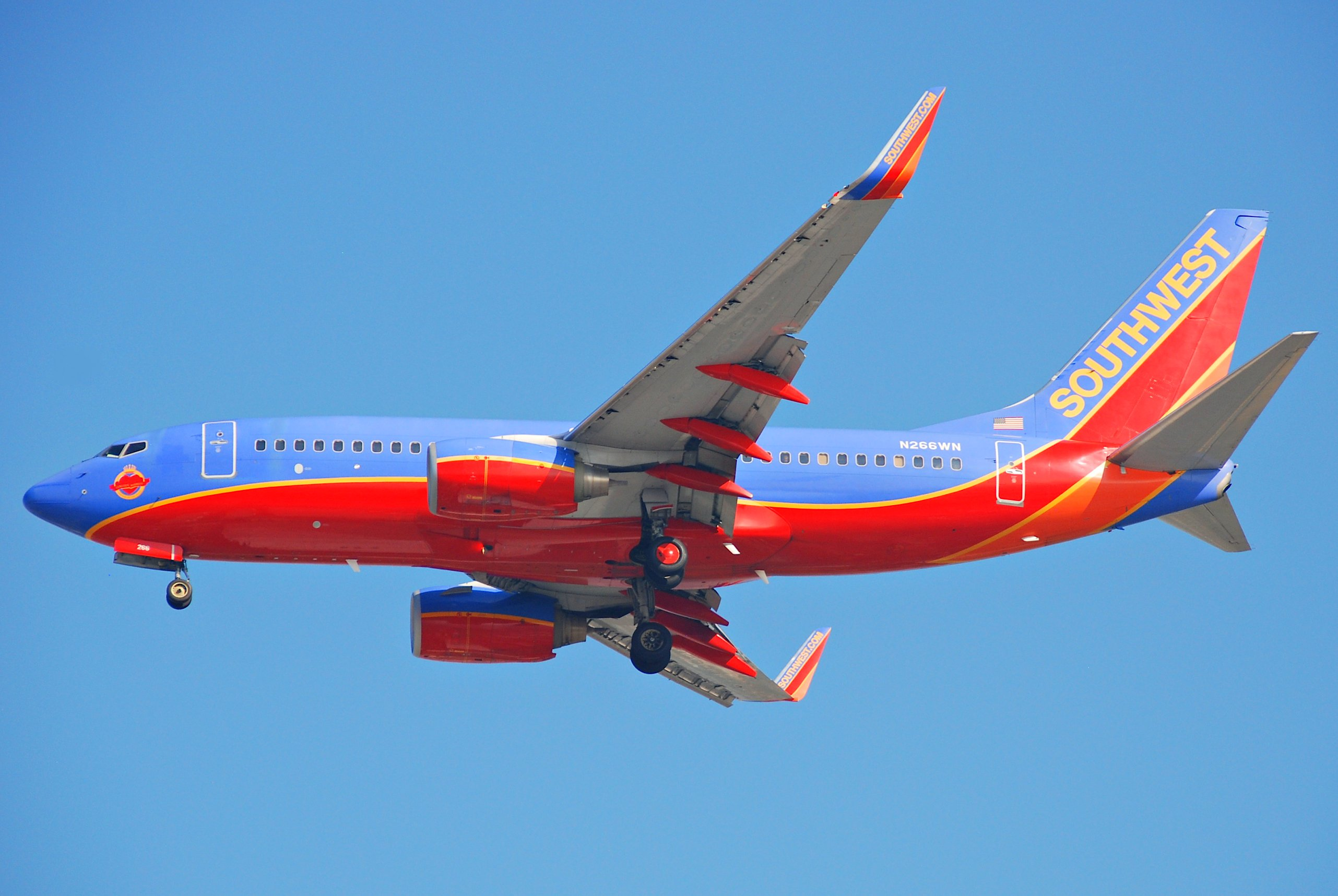
In 2007, Southwest Airlines added a livery to N266WN, a Boeing 737-7H4, dedicated to Colleen Barrett. Along with her name, the stylized heart decals decal is emblazoned with the title "Heroine Of The Heart." Following the retirement of the 737-700s, the decal was transferred to N872CB, a Boeing 737 MAX 8.

Barrett's term as president was met with immediate challenges. She started by inheriting a difficult labor dispute with the Transport Workers Union of America representing Southwest ground operations agents. Later during her first year, the airline industry was largely crippled by the effects of the September 11 attacks. Barrett's leadership at this time was crucial. She decided to immediately pull Southwest's light-hearted television advertisements and personally appeared in patriotic-themed replacements to reassure the public; Southwest was the only major airline to be profitable in the fourth quarter of that year and did not lay off any employees in the wake of the 9/11 attacks.

Barrett's leadership was not without some missteps along the way and had acknowledged the failure of her effort to create bereavement fares at the airline. She generated some criticism for the airline in 2007, when she publicly defended an employee's decision to forbid a customer from boarding a flight for wearing a mini-skirt.

Overall, Barrett's tenure as president was very successful. While most of Southwest's competitors faced service cuts, bankruptcy, or ceased operations during her term of leadership, Southwest remained profitable and grew to the largest carrier of domestic passengers. The airline also consistently had the fewest complaints according to the Department of Transportation, an accomplishment largely credited to Barrett's focus on customer service.

=== President emerita ===
In 2008, Barrett stepped down as president of the airline, passing the title to then-CEO Gary C. Kelly. Kelleher passed his title as Chairman to Kelly at the same time. Barrett and Kelleher were titled, respectively, President Emerita and Chairman Emeritus. They both chose to remain with the company. Barrett enjoyed returning to a regular employee role and continued to work in customer service and employee development roles for the next 5 years. Though she and Kelleher stepped away from day-to-day involvement in 2013, she remained involved with the airline in her emeritus role until her death.

In 2021, Southwest Airlines established the Colleen C. Barrett Institute for Cultural Excellence and Customer Service.

== Leadership style ==
Barrett was well known for her focus on servant leadership. She focused on egalitarian principles and treating all employees equally. Her general philosophy is that if you treat your employees well, they will treat your customers well, who in turn will come back and treat your share-holders well. She was a strong believer in the Golden Rule, and had it posted visibly in all Southwest locations. She had focused on hiring for fit over skill. In 2010, Barrett published a book with Ken Blanchard on her leadership philosophy titled Lead with LUV.

== Death ==
Barrett died on May 8, 2024, at age 79.

== Awards and recognitions ==
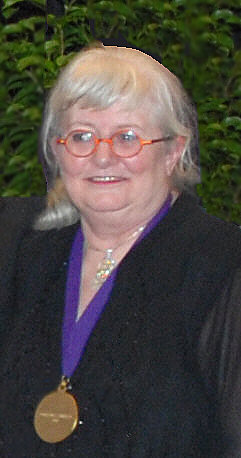
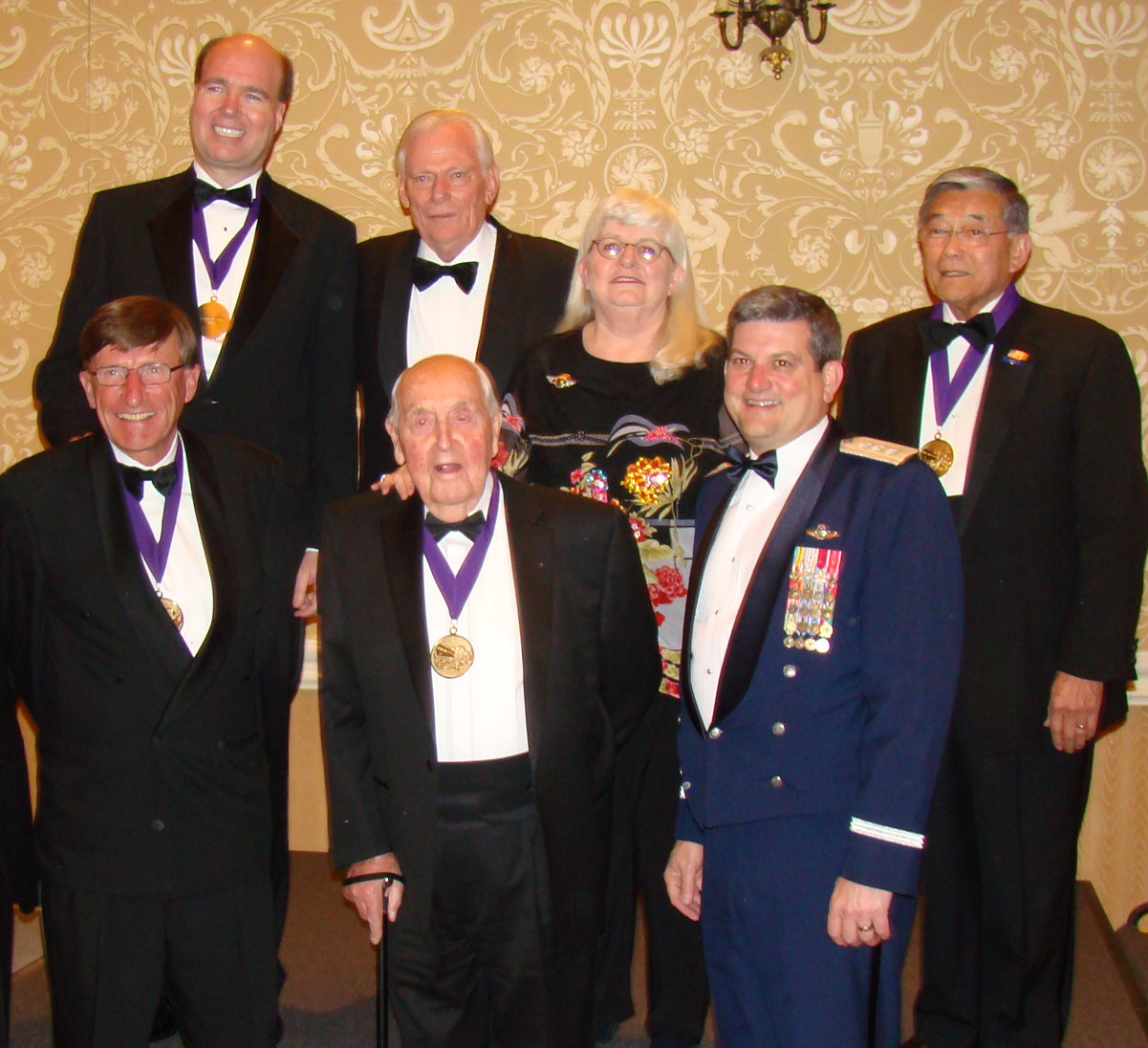
Colleen Barrett, then president of Southwest Airlines, at the Tony Jannus Awards Banquet, Tampa, Florida, in October 2007.

Barrett had stated, "You can't do things to get accolades; you do things because they are the right thing to do." Nonetheless, she had been the recipient of numerous honors throughout her career, including the following:

- 2004–2007: Ranked by Forbes as one of the 100 most powerful women
- 2005: Inducted into the Women in Aviation International Pioneer Hall of Fame
- 2005: Recipient of the Horatio Alger Award
- 2007: Recipient of the Outstanding Women in Aviation award
- 2007: Recipient of the Tony Jannus Award, the first woman to receive this recognition
- 2015: The Colleen Barrett Center for Innovation and Entrepreneurship at Becker College named in her honor
- 2016: Recipient of the Wright Brothers Memorial Trophy
- 2024: Inducted into the Texas Aviation Hall of Fame
- The Colleen Barrett Award for Administrative Excellence was named in her honor
- Listed by Women in Aviation as among the 100 most influential women in aviation
