= Sherman Municipal Airport =

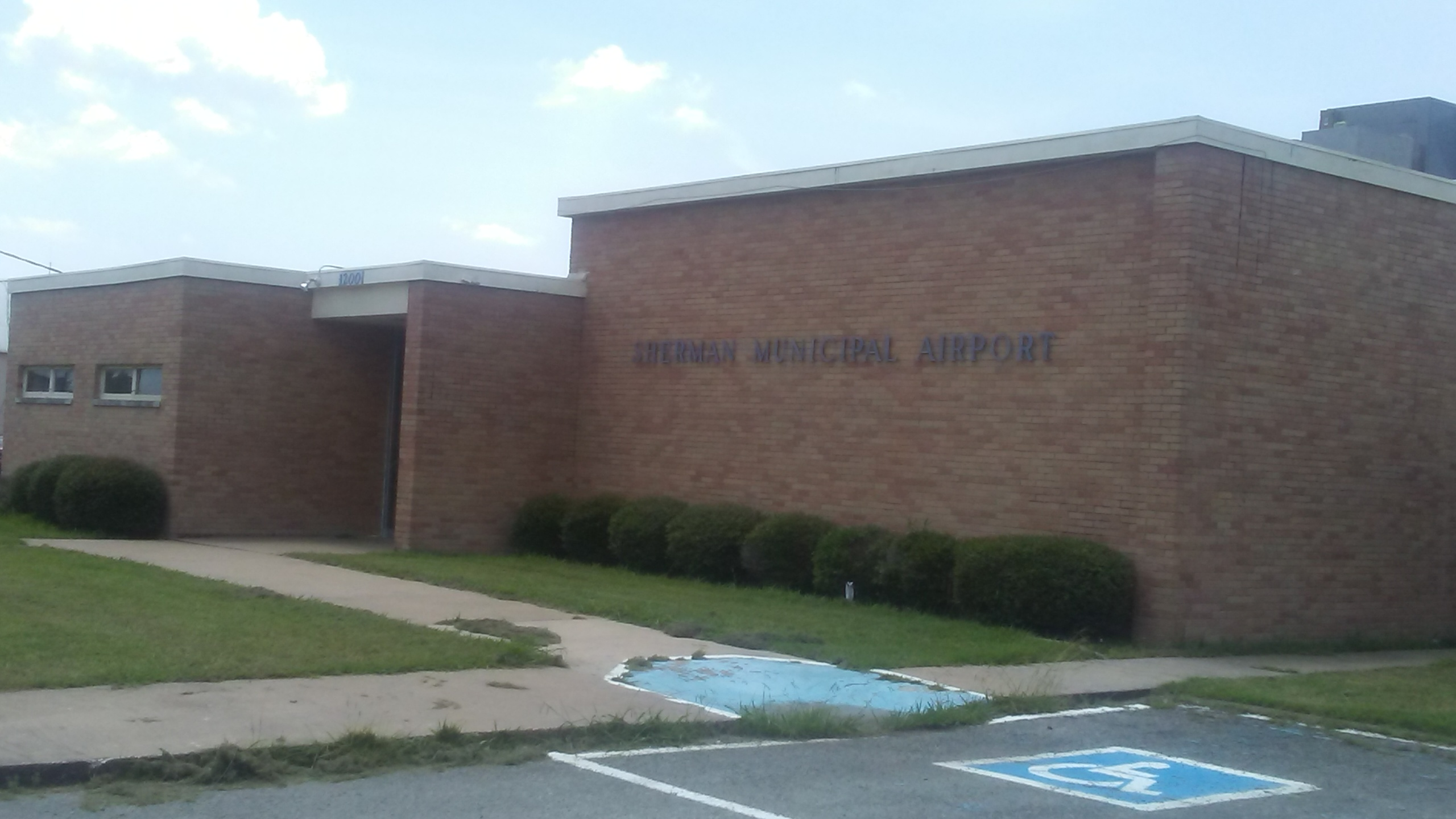
- IATA: none; ICAO: KSWI; FAA LID: SWI

Summary
- Airport type: Public
- Owner: City of Sherman
- Serves: Sherman, Texas
- Opened: November 28, 1928 (97 years ago)
- Elevation AMSL: 746 ft / 227 m
- Coordinates: 33°37′27″N 096°35′10″W
- Website: Official website

Map

Runways
Direction	Length		Surface
Direction	ft	m	Surface
16/34	4,006	1,221	Asphalt

Statistics (2019)
- Aircraft operations: 8,250
- Based aircraft: 23
- Source: Federal Aviation Administration

Sherman Municipal Airport (ICAO: KSWI, FAA LID: SWI) is a city-owned public airport located 1 mile (1.6 km) mile southeast of the central business district of Sherman, in Grayson County, Texas.

Many U.S. airports use the same three-letter location identifier for the FAA and IATA, but this airport is SWI to the FAA and has no IATA code.

== History ==
The first step to establish Sherman Municipal Airport was taken on 28 November 1928 when the Sherman City Council voted to lease a 100 acres (40 ha) field southeast of downtown that pilots had been using as a landing area. The airfield was operational by June of the following year. In September 1936, construction began on the first paved runways—a 2,500 feet (760 m) north–south runway and a 1,500 feet (460 m) northwest–southeast runway—funded by a US$35,312.30 (equivalent to $819,296 in 2025) federal grant and US$13,165 (equivalent to $309,154 in 2025) in city funds.

On 31 December 1949, the Civil Aeronautics Authority (CAA) granted Central Airlines permission to serve Sherman Municipal with commercial mail and passenger service, to start on 15 January 1950. However, service was suspended in 1951 when the airline upgraded to twin-engine aircraft that could not use the short runways. On 6 August 1952, the Sherman City Council approved a US$75,000 (equivalent to $909,305 in 2025) bond issue to extend the runways, with the expectation of an additional CAA grant to help fund the project. The grant funds did not materialize, but in May 1953, the city contributed additional funding to complete the project so that Central could resume service.

On 14 December 1971, high winds from a squall line destroyed one hangar at the airport and severely damaged another.

On 18 July 1997, a Cessna 172 allegedly stolen from the airport was illegally flown at very low altitude across Dallas/Fort Worth International Airport, Fort Worth Alliance Airport, and the landing area at a Bell Helicopter facility, causing significant air traffic disruptions. The unknown pilot then flew the aircraft back to Sherman Municipal and parked it. The Cessna's owner denied flying it that day, and stated that he could not positively identify the incident pilot because several people had access to the aircraft.

In 2002, there were discussions of closing the airport permanently, and the municipal airport advisory board was dissolved. However, by late 2019, interest in expanding the airport had increased: a private developer proposed an adjacent airpark-style residential development with runway access and private hangars, and in response to a long waiting list for hangar space, the city applied for a US$50,000 matching grant from the Texas Department of Transportation to build a new 7-unit hangar. On 16 October 2019, the advisory board was reinstated. On July 6, 2020, the Sherman City Council unanimously approved updates to its airport rules and regulations that will allow through-the-fence operations at the airport pending Texas DOT approval.

== Facilities ==
The airport covers 144 acres (58 ha) at an elevation of 746 ft (227 m). Its one runway, 16/34, is 4,006 ft × 75 ft (1,221 m × 23 m).

In the year ending 8 April 2019, the airport had 8,250 general aviation aircraft operations, an average of 23 per day. 23 aircraft were then based at this airport: 100% single-engine.

== Accidents and incidents ==
- 9 May 1931: A student pilot and a flight instructor in an unidentified aircraft were killed in a crash after taking off and performing a series of aerobatic maneuvers over and near the airport. Observers stated that the center section wing fuel tank broke loose and damaged the empennage as it subsequently fell away.
- 25 July 2000: An Schweizer 269C helicopter, registration number N298SH, abruptly yawed left and experienced a sudden increase in engine RPM on final approach. The aircraft bounced on impact and rolled over on its left side, suffering substantial damage; the pilot was uninjured while the single passenger suffered minor injuries. The accident was attributed to "the total failure of the clutch cable during landing, which resulted from fatigue cracking of the cable's individual wires."
- 9 June 2002: An Cessna 177, registration number N2282Y, bounced during landing and departed the left side of the runway. The aircraft was substantially damaged and the pilot suffered serious injuries; the single passenger was not injured. The accident was attributed to "The hard landing as result of the pilot's failure to maintain aircraft control during landing. A contributing factor was the gusty crosswinds."

== See also ==
- List of airports in Texas
