= Central Airlines =

US airline (1949–1967) that merged into Frontier

IATA	ICAO	Call sign
CN^{(1)}	CN^{(1)}	—
- Founded: 1944
- Commenced operations: September 15, 1949; 76 years ago
- Ceased operations: October 1, 1967; 58 years ago
- Hubs: Dallas, Denver, Fort Smith, AR, Fort Worth, Kansas City, Oklahoma City, Tulsa
- Destinations: See Destinations below
- Headquarters: Fort Worth, Texas, United States
- Key people: Lamar Muse (President)
- Founder: Keith Kahle

Notes
- (1) IATA, ICAO codes were the same until the 1980s

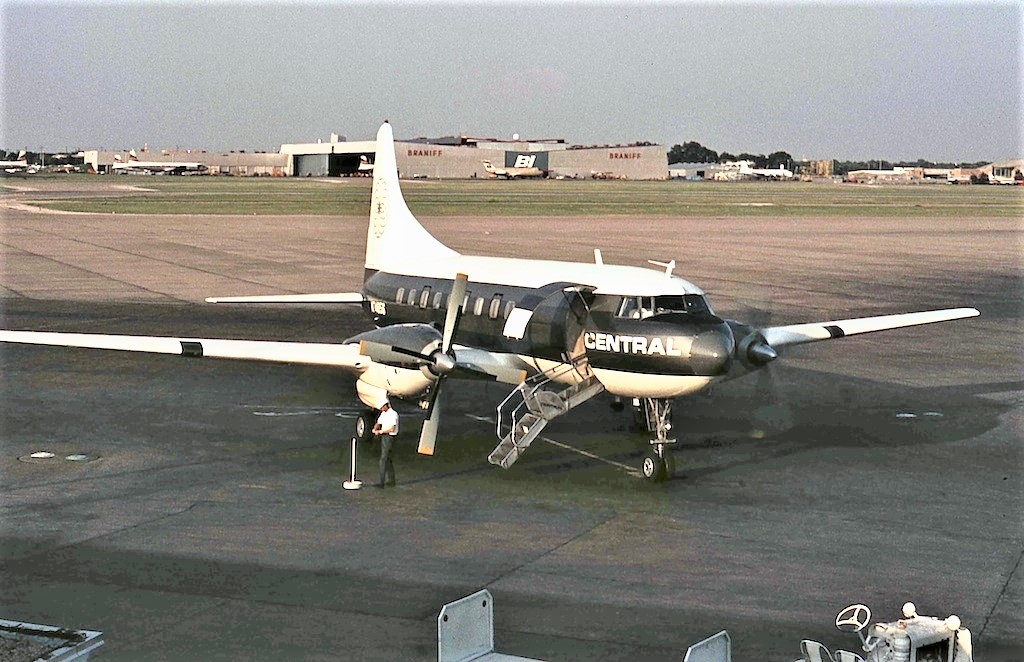
CV-600 Dallas Love Field 1966

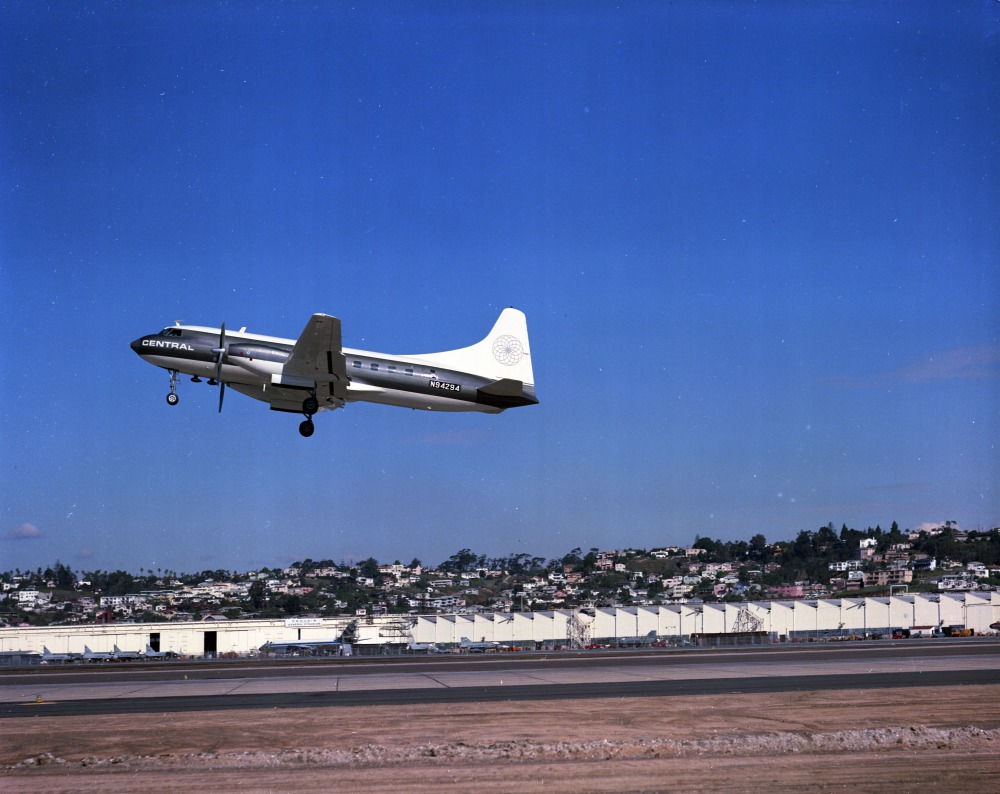
CV-600 San Diego 1965

Central Airlines was a local service carrier, a scheduled passenger airline operating in Arkansas, Colorado, Kansas, Missouri, Oklahoma, and Texas from 1949 to 1967. It was founded by Keith Kahle in 1944 to operate charter and fixed base services in Oklahoma, but was not granted an air operator's certificate until 1946 and did not begin scheduled flights until September 15, 1949, just before the certificate expired. Central was then headquartered at Meacham Field in Fort Worth, Texas. The airline was eventually acquired by and merged into the original Frontier Airlines which continued and expanded its network.

== History ==
Early backers and members of the board of directors included Fort Worth oilman F. Kirk Johnson, former City Councilman R.E. Harding, Jr., Don Earhart, and actor James Stewart; Stewart remained on the board for many years. Lamar Muse was president before going to Universal Airlines, Southwest Airlines, and then founding Muse Air.

Revenue passenger traffic, in millions of passenger-miles (scheduled flights only)
Year	Traffic
1951	5
1955	15
1960	32
1965	91

On November 27, 1946, the CAB awarded Central Airlines an operating certificate for commercial service in Oklahoma and Texas. Despite this, flights still had not started in March 1949, and the CAB gave the airline until July 1 of that year to start service or lose its certificate. On 10 August, Kahle announced that Central had purchased eight Beechcraft Bonanzas, and that service would start soon. The airline's inaugural flight finally occurred on 15 September 1949 from Fort Worth to Oklahoma City with intermediate stops in Dallas and Gainesville. By the end of its first year of service, Central had carried 8,122 passengers.

In November 1950, Central began operating three Douglas DC-3s, and announced that its fleet of eleven Bonanzas would be phased out as more DC-3s were acquired. Convair CV-240s were added in the 1960s; beginning in 1965 the CV-240s were converted to Convair CV-600s, their piston engines being replaced with Rolls-Royce Dart turboprop engines.

In August 1953 Central scheduled flights to 19 airports. Central's 1955 network blanketed Oklahoma and extended to Amarillo, Dallas-Fort Worth, Little Rock and Kansas City; in April 1957 it served 29 airports. When the airline merged into Frontier in October 1967, Central routes served 40 cities from Denver, Colorado to Kansas City and St. Louis, Missouri and south to Oklahoma City, Tulsa, Dallas and Fort Worth.

In 1961 the head office moved to Amon Carter Field (later renamed Greater Southwest International Airport) in Fort Worth. That same year, Central carried its millionth passenger; in 1962, Central was operating six Convairs and eighteen DC-3s, and carrying about 24,000 passengers a month.

Like other "local service" airlines regulated by the federal CAB, Central was subsidized; in 1963, its operating revenues of US$10.7 million (equivalent to US$113 million in 2025) included a US$4.5 million federal subsidy (equivalent to US$47 million in 2025).

On 20 September 1966, Central filed a petition with the CAB to merge with Ozark Air Lines, which would have created one of the largest local service carriers in the United States. Central cited financial difficulties as the reason for seeking a merger. The merged company would use the Ozark name. However, on 9 November 1966, the two airlines announced that merger talks had ended by mutual consent due to financial difficulties.

When it was acquired by and merged into the original Frontier Airlines on October 1, 1967, Central was operating a fleet of Convair CV-600 turboprops as well as sixteen Douglas piston-powered DC-3s. Central was planning to introduce new Douglas DC-9-10 jets with the airline running a print ad in the Official Airline Guide announcing this upcoming DC-9 service; however, the DC-9s were never delivered due to the merger. Frontier continued to operate the Convair CV-600s for a time but then retired them in favor of Convair CV-580 turboprops which were the backbone of Frontier's fleet in the late 1960s. Frontier would eventually introduce Boeing 737-200 jet service to smaller cities previously served by Central including Fort Smith, AR; Joplin, MO; Lawton, OK; Manhattan, KS; Pueblo, CO; Salina, KS; and Topeka, KS. In 1986 Frontier Airlines (1950-1986) was merged into Continental Airlines. In 2010 Continental was merged into United Airlines.

Central Airlines received four consecutive National Safety Council aviation safety awards from 1950 to 1953 for operating without a single accident or injury to passengers or crew. National Transportation Safety Board (NTSB) records indicate that no passenger was ever seriously injured or killed aboard a Central Airlines flight from 1962 to 1968.

== Destinations ==
On inauguration of service in late 1949 and early 1950, Central served the following destinations:

- Ada, OK
- Amarillo, TX
- Ardmore, OK
- Arkansas City, KS
- Bartlesville, OK
- Dallas, TX - Dallas Love Field
- Durant, OK
- Enid, OK
- Fort Worth, TX - Meacham Field
- Gainesville, TX
- Greenville, TX
- Holdenville, OK
- Oklahoma City, OK
- Okmulgee, OK
- Pampa, TX
- Paris, TX
- Ponca City, OK
- Shawnee, OK
- Sherman, TX - Sherman Municipal Airport
- Texarkana, AR/TX
- Tulsa, OK
- Wichita, KS
- Woodward, OK

According to its July 1, 1967 timetable, Central was serving the following destinations shortly before the merger with Frontier:

- Ada, OK
- Amarillo, TX
- Bartlesville, OK
- Borger, TX
- Colorado Springs, CO
- Dallas, TX - Dallas Love Field (DAL)
- Denver, CO
- Dodge City, KS
- Duncan, OK
- Enid, OK
- Fayetteville, AR
- Fort Leonard Wood, MO
- Fort Smith, AR
- Fort Worth, TX - Greater Southwest International Airport (GSW) - no longer in existence
- Garden City, KS
- Goodland, KS
- Great Bend, KS
- Guymon, OK
- Harrison, AR
- Hays, KS
- Hot Springs, AR
- Hutchinson, KS
- Joplin, MO
- Kansas City - Kansas City Municipal Airport (MKC)
- Lamar, CO
- Lawton, OK
- Liberal, KS
- Little Rock, AR
- Manhattan, KS
- McAlester, OK
- Muskogee, OK
- Paris, TX
- Parsons, KS
- Ponca City, OK
- Pueblo, CO
- St. Louis, MO
- Salina, KS
- Stillwater, OK
- Topeka, KS
- Tulsa, OK
- Wichita Falls, TX

The timetable states that Central was operating Convair 600s and Douglas DC-3s at this time.

== Fleet ==
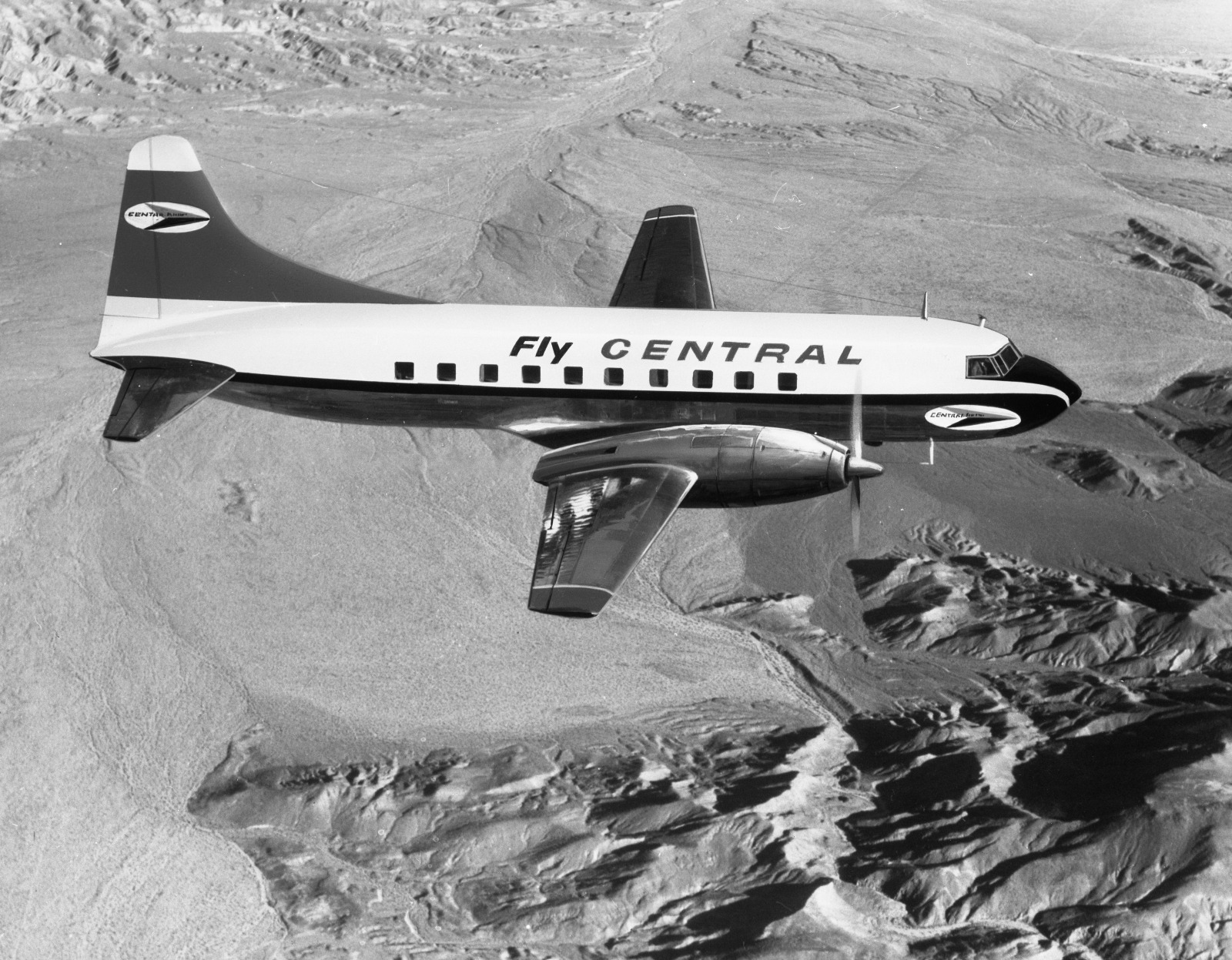
Convair 600 1964

Central Airlines operated the following:

- Beechcraft Bonanza (model A35)
- Convair 240
- Convair 600 (Convair 240 converted to Rolls-Royce Dart turboprop engines)
- Douglas DC-3

The airline announced it was planning to operate Douglas DC-9-10 jets, but none were delivered before the merger with Frontier.

== Accidents and incidents ==
- 20 July 1964: A flight attendant on a scheduled passenger flight suffered serious injuries when she was thrown against the cabin structure in a Douglas DC-3, registration number N91003, due to clear-air turbulence over Pueblo, Colorado. Eleven passengers and two pilots suffered minor or no injuries and the aircraft was not damaged.
- 8 January 1965: The pilots of Flight 168 to Topeka, Kansas, a Convair CV-240, registration number N74850, diverted to Tulsa International Airport and performed an intentional belly landing after several unsuccessful attempts to lower the jammed landing gear. The aircraft was substantially damaged but the nine passengers and three crew were not significantly injured.
- 27 June 1966: Pilots in a Convair CV-600, registration number N74856, had to perform evasive maneuvers near Hot Springs, Arkansas to avoid a mid-air collision with an unidentified light aircraft. One crew member suffered serious injuries while two crew and fourteen passengers suffered minor or no injuries; the Convair was not damaged.

== See also ==
- List of defunct airlines of the United States
