= Muse Air =

Southwest Airlines rival, then subsidiary (1980–1987)

Muse Air/TranStar Airlines
IATA	ICAO	Call sign
MC	MCA TST	MUSE AIR TRANSTAR
- Founded: 30 January 1980; 46 years ago
- Commenced operations: 15 July 1981; 45 years ago (as Muse Air)
- Ceased operations: 9 August 1987; 39 years ago (as TranStar)
- Hubs: Dallas, Houston
- Alliance: AirCal
- Fleet size: 16
- Destinations: Texas, California, Florida, Louisiana, Nevada, Oklahoma
- Headquarters: Houston, Texas
- Key people: Michael Muse; Lamar Muse; Herb Kelleher

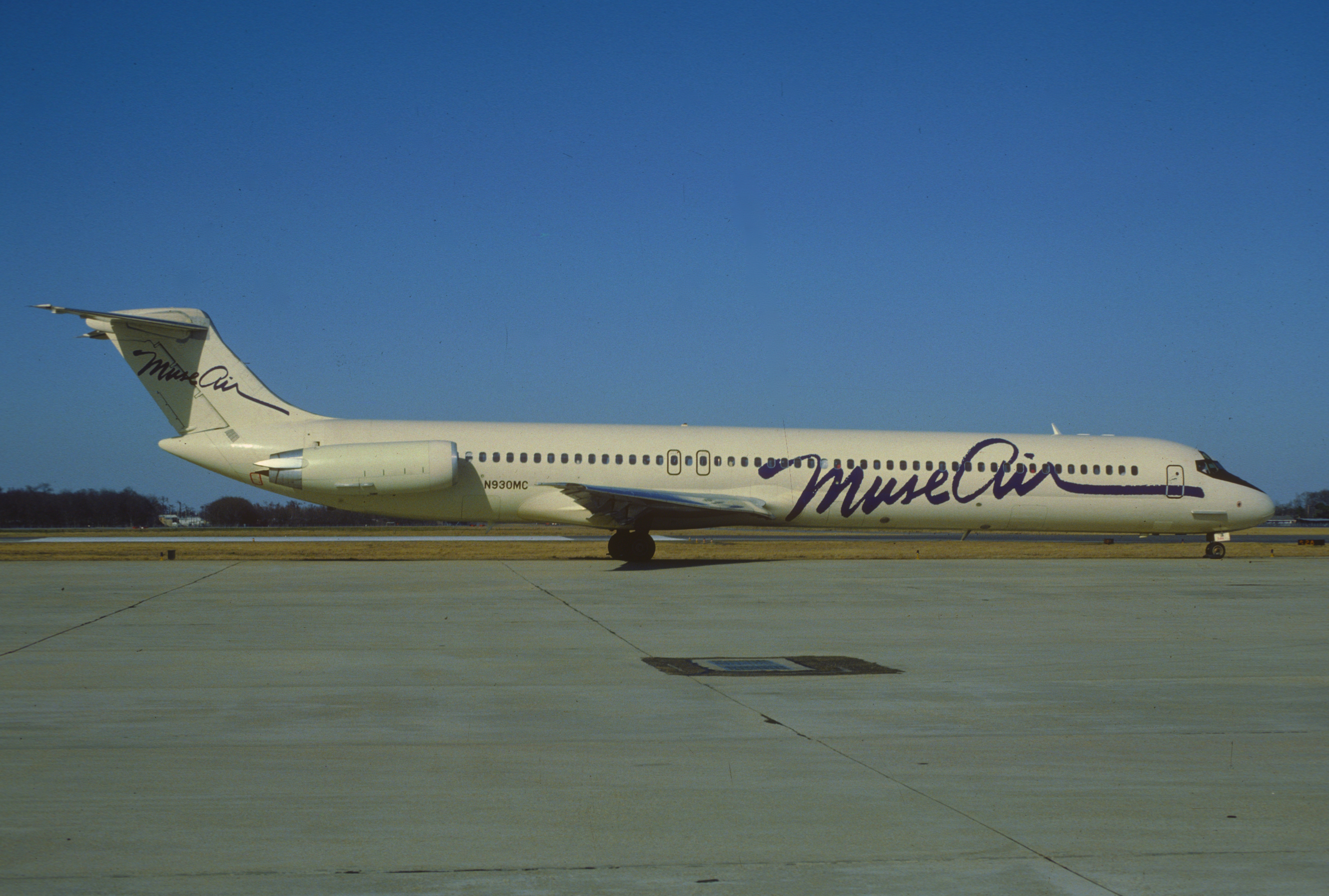
MD-82 at New Orleans February 1984

Muse Air was a domestic U.S. airline founded in 1980 by Michael Muse, a former CFO of Southwest Airlines, and his father Lamar Muse, the founding president of Southwest. Muse Air was notable for initially choosing to compete head-to-head against Southwest, thereby gaining the name "Revenge Air", given the circumstances under which the Muses departed Southwest. Muse Air also chose to be a non-smoking airline at a time when smoking was prevalent on commercial aircraft.

Southwest acquired Muse Air in 1985 and initially continued to operate it under the name TranStar Airlines. TranStar turned significantly unprofitable after it came under competitive attack from Frank Lorenzo's Continental Airlines, also based in Houston. This caused Southwest to shut down TranStar in summer 1987. Southwest CEO Herb Kelleher later said that continuing to operate Muse Air was his greatest management mistake.

== Muse Air ==
Company formation was announced October 27, 1980 in conjunction with an application to the Civil Aeronautics Board (CAB) as a Houston, Texas-based airline named Muse Air. The driving force behind the airline was Michael Muse, former CFO of Southwest Airlines, the son of Lamar Muse, founding president and CEO (1971–1978) of Southwest Airlines. Lamar said of his son, “I told him that to begin with, he would have to do all the work and I would have to have all the fun," and said he was to step back once fundraising was complete. Lamar's memoir says he helped his son start the airline in order to maintain a "tenuous" relationship with him. However, the favorable reception by the CAB and investors was clearly due to the fact that Lamar was CEO and Chairman. Further, initial advertising heavily emphasized Lamar. In April 1981, an initial public offering raised over $35mm, and an additional $75mm was raised in debt, making Muse Air the best capitalized airline startup to that point.

Muse Air launched July 15, 1981 between Dallas Love Field (DAL) and Houston Hobby Airport (HOU) in 1981 with two McDonnell Douglas MD-80 aircraft, in head-to-head competition with Southwest's single busiest route. Muse offered a more upscale service (including assigned seating and other creature comforts) than Southwest, and was a nonsmoking airline. The August 1981 air traffic controller's strike, which suppressed the ability of airlines to fly at all for several years, almost immediately made things difficult for the company, though this constraint was relaxed somewhat on the collapse of Braniff in May 1982, allowing Muse Air to backfill for some of the lost capacity. As promised Lamar stepped back and let Michael take the lead, 33 years old when he officially became CEO. Lamar retreated to his boat in British Columbia.

Michael Muse did not have his father's experience, the deregulated era of the 1980s was much tougher than the regulated era in which Lamar had such great success at Southwest, but the most mystifying issue was why Michael insisted on competing with Southwest, prompting observers to dub Muse Air "Revenge Air". Despite further capital raising, by the end of 1984 the company was in trouble. Lamar Muse reached out to a friend, Harold Simmons, president of Amalgamated Sugar Company who offered funding on the condition that Lamar resume the position of CEO. Lamar and Michael did not speak again for years.

Muse Air was initially headquartered near Dallas Love Field in Dallas, Texas, later moving to William P. Hobby Airport in Houston.

Muse Air/TranStar Airlines Financial Results, 1981 thru 1987
(USD 000)	1981	1982	1983	1984	1985	1986	1987
Op revenue	6,296	33,056	72,928	101,918	131,851	149,943	80,499
Op profit (loss)	(5,537)	(4,738)	4,616	(3,300)	8,294	7,663	(10,734)
Net profit (loss)	(3,968)	11,468	(1,959)	(17,042)	(8,733)	(1,301)	(5,004)^{(1)}
Op margin	−87.9%	−14.3%	6.3%	−3.2%	6.3%	5.1%	−13.3%
Net margin	−63.0%	34.7%	−2.7%	−16.7%	−6.6%	−0.9%	−6.2%^{(1)}
(1) 1987 figure is for pre-tax.

== TranStar ==
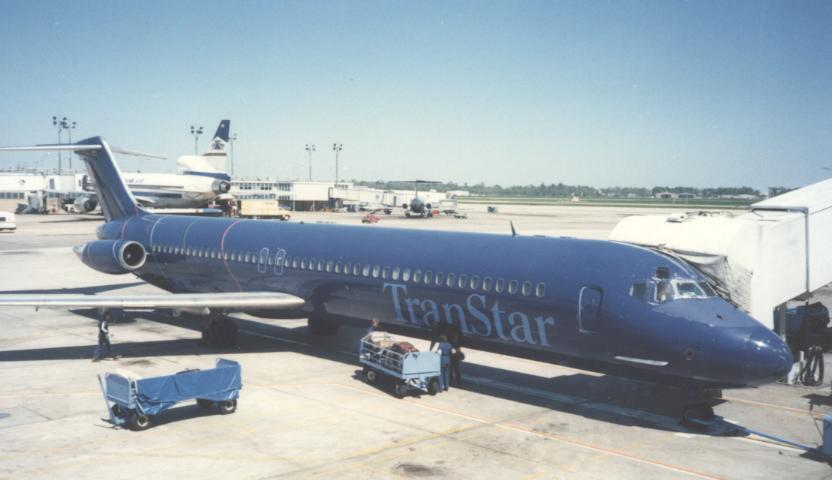
TranStar DC-9

Herb Kelleher, CEO of Southwest, offered to buy Muse Air, thereby relieving Lamar Muse of the need to stay CEO. The purchase price reflected a need to provide Harold Simmons with a healthy return on his investment. The purchase was announced in March 1985, the deal closed June 25. Muse Air continued to operate as a subsidiary of Southwest, changing its name to TranStar Airlines in February 1986. Southwest continued to run TranStar as a somewhat more upmarket airline than Southwest based in Houston Hobby. This attracted the attention of Continental, which had a hub in the other Houston airport, Intercontinental, and was then run by Frank Lorenzo. Lorenzo was an old adversary, having run Texas International in the 1970s, when that airline came off much the worse as Southwest spread its service across Texas. Continental went after TranStar, which proceeded to make heavy losses. Kelleher recognized he'd miscalculated, shut TranStar on August 9, 1987 and sold many of the assets to Lorenzo. At the time of his retirement as Southwest CEO, Kelleher saw the continued operation of Muse (in the form of TranStar) as the biggest mistake of his time as leader.

== Muse Air alliance with AirCal ==
In 1984, Muse Air entered into an alliance with California-based AirCal with connections being listed in its April 29, 1984 timetable via Los Angeles to and from AirCal flights serving Oakland, Portland, Oregon, Reno, Sacramento, San Francisco, San Jose and Seattle. The January 1, 1984 AirCal timetable listed connections via Los Angeles and Ontario to and from Muse Air flights serving Austin, Houston, Midland/Odessa and New Orleans.

== No smoking policy ==
Muse Air prohibited smoking long before the U.S. government restricted smoking on board scheduled commercial airline flights. The intent was to not tarnish the airline's brand new MD-80 aircraft. However in 1985 Muse Air rescinded the smoking ban.

== Destinations ==
=== Muse Air 1982 ===
According to the September 15, 1982 Muse Air route map, the airline was serving the following destinations by the fall of that year:

- Houston, Texas – Hobby Airport (HOU)
- Dallas, Texas – Love Field (DAL)
- Los Angeles, California – Los Angeles International Airport (LAX)
- Midland, Texas/Odessa, Texas (MAF)
- Tulsa, Oklahoma (TUL)

=== Muse Air 1985 ===
According to its July 20, 1985 route map, the following destinations were being served by Muse Air shortly after its acquisition by Southwest Airlines:

- Austin, Texas (AUS)
- Brownsville, Texas (BRO)
- Dallas, Texas – Love Field (DAL)
- Houston, Texas – Hobby Airport (HOU) - Hub
- Las Vegas, Nevada (LAS)
- Los Angeles, California – Los Angeles International Airport (LAX)
- McAllen, Texas (MFE)
- Midland/Odessa, Texas (MAF)
- New Orleans, Louisiana (MSY) – Focus city
- Orlando, Florida (MCO)
- San Antonio, Texas (SAT)
- San Jose, California (SJC)
- Tampa, Florida (TPA)
- Tulsa, Oklahoma (TUL)

Muse Air also previously served Lubbock, Texas (LBB) in 1983, Ontario, California (ONT) in 1984 and Oklahoma City, Oklahoma (OKC) in 1985.

=== TranStar 1987 ===
According to its June 15, 1987 route map, the following destinations were being served by TranStar shortly before the airline was shut down:

- Austin, Texas (AUS) – Focus city
- Brownsville, Texas (BRO)
- Dallas, Texas – Love Field (DAL)
- Houston, Texas – Hobby Airport (HOU) - Hub
- Las Vegas, Nevada (LAS)
- Los Angeles, California – Los Angeles International Airport (LAX)
- Miami, Florida (MIA)
- New Orleans, Louisiana (MSY) – Focus city
- Orlando, Florida (MCO)
- San Antonio, Texas (SAT)
- San Diego, California (SAN)
- San Francisco, California (SFO)
- Tampa, Florida (TPA)

TranStar also previously served McAllen, Texas (MFE) and Midland/Odessa, Texas (MAF) during 1986.

== Fleet ==
According to the Muse Air historical website, the airline operated the following jet aircraft during its existence as Muse Air and TranStar:

- 1 – McDonnell Douglas DC-9-30
- 8 – McDonnell Douglas DC-9-50
- 2 – McDonnell Douglas MD-81
- 8 – McDonnell Douglas MD-82
- 2 – McDonnell Douglas MD-83

The Muse Air historical website also states the airline owned two de Havilland Canada DHC-6 Twin Otter STOL capable turboprop aircraft at one point; however, it appears they were not operated in scheduled service.

== See also ==
- List of defunct airlines of the United States
- History of Southwest Airlines
- Lamar Muse
