= Lamar Muse =

American airline executive (1920–2007)

M. Lamar Muse
- Born: Marion Lamar Muse; June 4, 1920; Houston, Texas, United States
- Died: February 7, 2007 (aged 86)
- Occupation: Airline executive
- Known for: First CEO of Southwest Airlines; Co-founder of Muse Air
- Children: Includes Michael Muse

M. Lamar Muse (June 4, 1920 – February 7, 2007) was an American airline executive. He is best known as establishing the foundations of the business model of Southwest Airlines as its first CEO (1971–1978) and as co-founder of an eponymous airline Muse Air (1980–1986).

== Background ==
Born Marion Lamar Muse (but known as Lamar; Muse did not like his first name) in Houston, Muse grew up in Palestine, Texas, the son of a railroad engineer. He attended but did not graduate from Southwestern University and Texas Christian University, where he took business classes, dropping out to become an accountant at Price Waterhouse. This was interrupted when he enlisted in the United States Army Corps of Engineers towards the end of World War II. He spent five years total at Price Waterhouse and shortly after he left, qualified as a Certified Public Accountant.

== Airline career prior to Southwest ==
In 1948, he started his airline career in Houston as secretary-treasurer of Trans Texas Airways, a local service carrier, a then-new type of airline sponsored by the Civil Aeronautics Board (CAB), the Federal agency tasked with the then-tight regulation of US airlines.

In 1960–61 he spent a year at American Airlines in New York City as Assistant Vice President of Planning, but disliked the bureaucratic environment of the big airline. He moved to Atlanta to take the top financial position at Southern Airways, another local service airline, for three years.

In 1965 he landed the top job at Central Airlines, yet another local service airline, this one based in Fort Worth, Texas. He quickly improved its fortunes, leading its owner to sell the airline in 1967 to the original Frontier Airlines, a different airline from the Frontier Airlines of today.

Muse's last stop before Southwest was as CEO and part-owner of Detroit-based Universal Airlines, a sizeable "supplemental" (the CAB term-of-art for charter airline) with three businesses: flying parts for auto manufacturers, flying freight for the military and passenger charters. Muse again made the carrier profitable.

== Southwest Airlines ==
Muse was elected for a three-year term as president and CEO of what was then known as Air Southwest on January 1, 1970. The embryonic carrier had just survived a bruising legal battle to preserve its right to fly as an intrastate airline under the economic regulation of the Texas Aeronautics Commission (TAC). This had exhausted its financial resources, leaving it with little more than the right to fly between the cities of Dallas, Houston and San Antonio. Founder Rollin King and cofounder Herb Kelleher got the carrier to this point, but neither then had any experience running an airline.

Muse changed the name to Southwest Airlines, moved the headquarters to Dallas, acquired aircraft, raised capital (including a June initial public offering) acquired crews, visited Pacific Southwest Airlines (the California intrastate airline that was the inspiration for Southwest) to better understand the model and obtained operational (as opposed to economic) certification from the Federal Aviation Administration. Southwest launched June 18, 1971. All of this was in the teeth of withering opposition from Federally-regulated competitors including some illegal actions: two competitors were fined for violations of anti-trust legislation for actions they took against Southwest at this time.

Southwest initially made significant losses. Profitability came only in 1973, after inventing 10-minute aircraft turnarounds (thereby increasing aircraft use), discovering the power of low fares to stimulate discretionary travel and moving the airline's Houston base to Houston Hobby airport, closer to downtown. Southwest would not make another annual loss until 2020 passenger traffic collapsed due to the COVID-19 pandemic. Another long-running legal battle would be required to ensure the airline could continue to operate at Dallas Love Field after Dallas Fort Worth Regional Airport opened in 1974.

Southwest expanded to its fourth city in 1975, Harlingen, Texas in the Rio Grande Valley. By May 1976, Southwest achieved a 73% market share on its four-route system. The still-tiny airline had muscled aside much larger Federally-regulated carriers. Southwest ended 1978 with 13 aircraft flying to nine Texas cities with a 26% operating margin, far higher than the industry. By then, Muse was gone.

== Departure from Southwest ==
Muse got offside with Southwest's board of directors. In January 1977 he appointed his then 27-year-old son Michael Muse to the top financial position. Muse also pushed for Southwest to expand to Chicago Midway Airport, reasoning that in a deregulated environment Midway would have the same potential as Dallas Love Field or Houston Hobby airports. At the time, the Federal government was moving towards deregulating the industry, a process that would culminate in the 1978 Airline Deregulation Act. However, Midway expansion would require a substantial investment by Southwest and it was noted that it would result in larger roles for Muse and his son. The focus of board resistance was Rollin King. Muse made a "me or him" ultimatum, and was shocked when the board accepted his resignation on March 28, 1978.

== Revenge Air ==
Michael Muse was the driving force behind Muse Air. In his memoirs, Lamar Muse said he backed the carrier to preserve a "tenuous" relationship with his son and Lamar was not shy about saying it was Michael who was doing the heavy lifting. However, in the eyes of the CAB (which economically certificated the airline) and investors (who made Muse Air the best funded startup to that date), it was the presence of Lamar (the chairman of the board and original CEO), that mattered. Muse Air was publicly announced in October 1980, had an initial public offering April 1981 and launched in July, going head-to-head with Southwest on its single-largest route, Dallas to Houston.

Almost immediately, Muse Air was affected by the August 1981 air traffic controller strike, which prompted President Ronald Reagan to fire most air traffic controllers, putting a long-term damper on the ability of airlines to expand. The airline obtained some relief in May 1982, when Braniff collapsed, allowing Muse Air to backfill some of that lost capacity. Also in 1982, Michael Muse took the CEO role at age 33. Michael's penchant for taking on Southwest prompted observers to dub the airline "Revenge Air".

But Michael Muse did not have his father's experience, and the deregulated industry of the 1980s was a tougher business than the regulated industry of the 1970s in which Lamar had such success. In one sense, Lamar had done his job too well: Southwest was a very tough competitor. By late 1984, Muse Air was in serious trouble. Lamar Muse got a friend, Harold Simmons, to make an investment, but Simmons required Lamar eject Michael and take personal control. Michael did not speak to his father for years thereafter. It was only later that investors understood Muse Air was in significant part an arena for the expression of father-son dynamics. In early 1985, Herb Kelleher, now CEO of Southwest, approached Lamar Muse about purchasing Muse Air – the deal was announced in March and consummated in June. Lamar Muse was now out of the airline business for good.

== Legacy ==
Until Elliott Management took over Southwest Airlines, the carrier still reflected Lamar Muse. Key business model characteristics, such as no-frills, short-haul single-class service on 737s, fast aircraft turnarounds and high aircraft use, the use of smaller airports closer to downtown, stimulation of discretionary travel through low fares, a "fun" airline culture, a focus on rock-solid financials, employee profit-sharing, its Dallas home, the name of the airline, its ticker symbol ("LUV") – all date from the Muse era, many his personal initiatives. Some of these, such as no-frills, single-class service, were in explicit imitation of PSA. Others of them were homegrown. But all date to his era.

But Muse was largely written out of Southwest's official history and anytime Herb Kelleher discussed the old days, Lamar Muse tended to be unmentioned. For instance, a 2014 book Texas Takes Wing, written for the 100th anniversary of Texas aviation, thanks Kelleher and Southwest's corporate historian, yet native-Texan Lamar Muse appears only indirectly – once as the husband of his wife (credited with Southwest's flight attendant uniforms) and once as father of Michael (credited with the founding of Muse Air). By contrast, "Kelleher" appears 26 times and "Southwest Airlines" 45. Days before Muse's death in 2007, a Wall St Journal article noted the rupture, as friends clamored for Southwest to recognize Muse before he died. Southwest agreed to make a large donation to a Muse charity, and the article noted that "in an interview, Mr. Kelleher gave Mr. Muse full credit for creating the original business blueprint." Yet the 2014 book was published seven years thereafter. And in 2022, Texas Monthly printed a review of Leading with Heart, a book celebrating Southwest's 50th anniversary, characterized by Texas Monthly as "the Gospel of Herb." The review noted "the book seems to go through tortuous contortions to avoid using the name of Lamar Muse." By this time, Kelleher had been dead a few years.
