= Herb Kelleher =

American airline businessman (1931–2019)

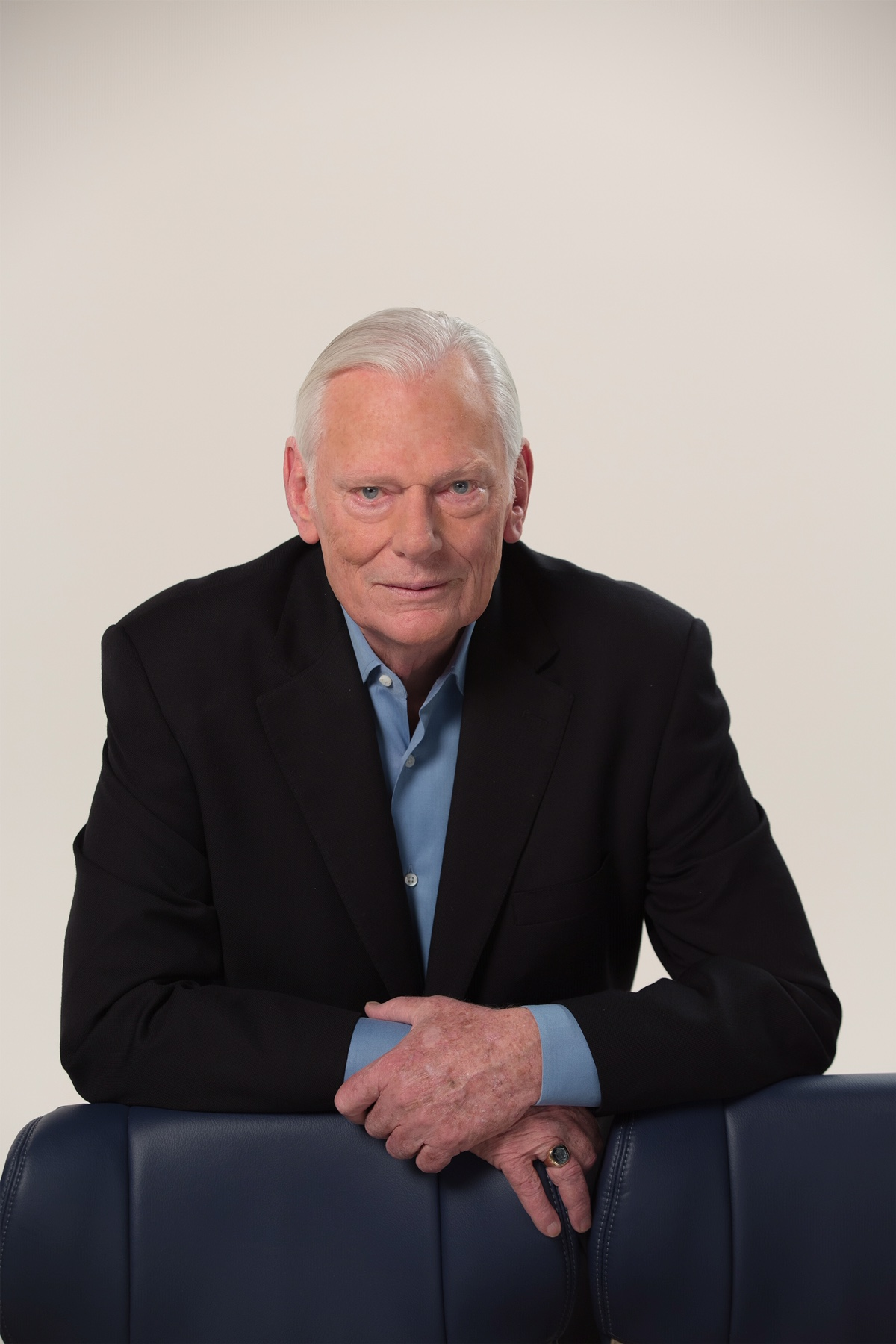
- Kelleher in 2013
- Born: Herbert David Kelleher; March 12, 1931; Camden, New Jersey, U.S.
- Died: January 3, 2019 (aged 87); Dallas, Texas, U.S.
- Education: Wesleyan University (BA); New York University (JD)
- Occupation: Businessman
- Known for: Co-founder of Southwest Airlines
- Spouse: Joan Negley
- Children: 4

Herbert David Kelleher (March 12, 1931 – January 3, 2019) was an American billionaire airline businessman and lawyer. He was the co-founder, later CEO, and chairman emeritus of Southwest Airlines until his death in 2019.

== Early life ==
Kelleher was born in Camden, New Jersey, on March 12, 1931, and raised in Audubon, New Jersey, where he graduated from Haddon Heights High School. He earned a bachelor's degree from Wesleyan University where he was an Olin Scholar and where his major was English and his minor philosophy, and a Juris Doctor (cum laude) from New York University School of Law where he was a Root-Tilden Scholar.

== Career ==
After clerking for a New Jersey Supreme Court justice, Kelleher moved to Texas intending to start a law firm or a business. He was a partner in Oppenheimer, Rosenberg, Kelleher & Wheatley, 1969–1981. Kelleher and one of his law clients, Texas businessman Rollin King, created the concept with banker John Parker that later became Southwest Airlines. An often retold founding myth claimed the business plan was written out on a cocktail napkin in a San Antonio restaurant, though Kelleher and King have both stated that there was no literal cocktail napkin. They originally devised a very simple plan of connecting the Texas Triangle with low-cost air service, patterned largely on California's Pacific Southwest Airlines. After incorporating the company initially as "Air Southwest Co." in 1967, Kelleher and King faced four years of setbacks and legal challenges from competitors that culminated in winning key cases before the Supreme Court of the United States in December 1970 and the Supreme Court of Texas in June 1971. The first flights finally took off on June 18, 1971.

Reflecting back on that time Kelleher said, "I think my greatest moment in business was when the first Southwest airplane arrived after four years of litigation and I walked up to it and I kissed that baby on the lips and I cried." Kelleher's early involvement in the company was helping the company navigate legal concerns and as an advisor to the operation and later as general counsel. Lamar Muse was hired as CEO, but after struggles between Muse and King escalated over the next several years, Muse resigned in 1978. Kelleher was installed as chairman of the board in March of that year and the board appointed him as temporary CEO until hiring Howard Putnam as the new CEO and president. In 1981, after Putnam left to head Braniff Airways, he was appointed the full-time CEO and president, positions he held for 20 years.

Under Kelleher's leadership, Southwest succeeded by a strategy of offering low fares to its passengers, eliminating unnecessary services, using a single aircraft type (the Boeing 737) (except for use of the Boeing 727 and use of MD-80 by TranStar and 717 by AirTran), avoiding the hub-and-spoke scheduling system used by other airlines in favor of building point-to-point traffic, and focusing on secondary airports such as Chicago-Midway (instead of Chicago-O'Hare), Dallas Love Field (instead of DFW), and Orange County, California. Later, some hub flights were operated at airports, such as ATL, LAS, PHX, DEN, STL, and BWI and some major airports, like ORD, LGA, LAX, SFO, and DEN. The company he founded and built has consistently been named among the most admired companies in America in Fortune magazine's annual poll. Fortune has also called him perhaps the best CEO in America.

Your employees come first. And if you treat your employees right, guess what? Your customers come back, and that makes your shareholders happy. Start with employees and the rest follows from that.

— Herb Kelleher

Kelleher's outrageous personality created a corporate culture which made Southwest employees well known for taking themselves lightly but their jobs seriously. His culture-leadership was well-demonstrated in an arm-wrestling event in March 1992. Shortly after Southwest started using the "Just Plane Smart" motto, Stevens Aviation, who had been using "Plane Smart" for their motto, threatened a trademark lawsuit, which was resolved between Kelleher and Stevens Aviation CEO Kurt Herwald in an arm-wrestling match, now known as "Malice in Dallas". Kelleher lost the match, but was allowed to use the slogan in exchange for a $5,000 charitable donation and conceding Stevens' legal claim to the slogan.

In March 2001, Kelleher stepped down as CEO and president of Southwest. He passed the CEO role onto James Parker and the president role to Colleen Barrett, although he remained chairman. In July 2007, Southwest announced that Kelleher would step down as chairman and resign from the board of directors in May 2008. The retirement of Barrett as president was announced at the same time, though the two would remain full-time employees for another five years. Kelleher ultimately stepped down as chairman on May 21, 2008. Immediately following, Southwest Airlines filled both the chairman and president positions with then-current CEO Gary C. Kelly, who had taken over the CEO position from Parker three years earlier. Kelleher was given the title of chairman emeritus with an office at Southwest Airlines headquarters and he remained connected to the company until his death in 2019.

In July 2010, Kelleher was appointed chair of the Federal Reserve Bank of Dallas board of directors for 2011. Kelleher's term expired in 2013. Previously, he had served as deputy chair.

== Awards ==
Kelleher was the recipient of over 100 awards and honors in the worlds of business and aviation during his life. Some of the most notable include:

- Inducted into the Texas Business Hall of Fame, 1988.
- Tony Jannus Award for outstanding leadership in the commercial aviation industry, 1993.
- Golden Plate Award of the American Academy of Achievement, 1996.
- Chief Executive named him CEO of the year for 1999.
- International Air & Space Hall of Fame inductee at the San Diego Air & Space Museum, 2002.
- Bower Award for Business Leadership, 2003.
- L. Welch Pogue Award for Lifetime Achievement in Aviation, 2005.
- Inducted into the National Aviation Hall of Fame, 2008.
- The section of Cedar Springs Road in Dallas, Texas, leading to Love Field Airport was officially renamed Herb Kelleher Way in 2014.

== Personal life ==
At Wesleyan he was a member of Delta Kappa Epsilon fraternity. On a blind date at a basketball game, he met Joan Negley who was a student at Connecticut College in New London. The two got married, and Joan was the person who introduced him to the state of Texas, which he also fell in love with, saying "The greatest business decision I ever made ...was the move to Texas." They had four children, Julie, Michael, Ruth and David.

Kelleher was known for getting little sleep and for his affinity for Wild Turkey bourbon and cigarettes. He was diagnosed with prostate cancer in 1999, and underwent radiation therapy. He died on January 3, 2019, in Dallas at the age of 87.
