= Rollin King =

American businessman (1931–2014)

Rollin W. King (April 10, 1931 – June 26, 2014) was an American businessman and investment consultant. He is best known as the co-founder and former director of Southwest Airlines.

== Background ==
King was a scion of the Cleveland, Ohio White family of White Motor Company fame. King graduated from Case Western Reserve University in 1955. King moved to Texas in 1962. He had received an M.B.A. from Harvard University and was working as an investment consultant. In 1964 he made his initial foray into airplane transportation, buying a local air charter company. During that time he watched with interest the growing market share of one of the nation's oldest low-cost air carriers, Pacific Southwest Airlines, and became determined to create a similar operation in Texas.

== Southwest Airlines ==
King's involvement with Southwest Airlines dates from 15 March 1967, when he and Herb Kelleher incorporated the Air Southwest Company in Texas, with intention of being an intrastate airline, taking inspiration from Pacific Southwest Airlines, a successful intrastate carrier in California. Such airlines had more flexibility within the then otherwise tightly regulated US airline business. However, three airlines with bases in Texas launched legal action to keep the startup company from initiating operations, so it did not begin operations until 18 June 1971. King had hired Kelleher to provide legal representation for the nascent operation. From 1968 until 1970 King was responsible for recruiting a board of directors, writing the business plan, and raising the money necessary to fund the company's activities aimed at becoming certified by the State of Texas to provide airline service between Dallas, Houston and San Antonio.

Lamar Muse joined the company on 1 January 1971, being named President (King remained as a company director), and the company changed its name to Southwest Airlines on 28 March of that year. Muse began hiring pilots and arranging for aircraft purchases.

== After Southwest Airlines and death ==
King remained in the Southwest Airlines management, and was a member of the board of directors until 2006. He also served on the executive committee and audit committee during that time. In 1991 King was asked to participate in an effort to restore a Panama-owned airline, Air Panamá Internacional. He was named Vice Chairman and Chief Executive of the reworked company, which had been renamed Air Panama International. However, by 1993 it was evident that the effort was unsuccessful, and no flights were made by the company.

King left Southwest Airlines in 2006, after which he engaged in executive education and consulting as the principal of Rollin King Associates from 1989 until his retirement at the end of 1995. During his later years he was principally engaged in private investments.

King died in Dallas, Texas on June 26, 2014. His funeral was attended by Gary C. Kelly, the chief executive officer of Southwest Airlines, as well as other company representatives.
