= Southwest Airlines fleet =

Airliner fleet

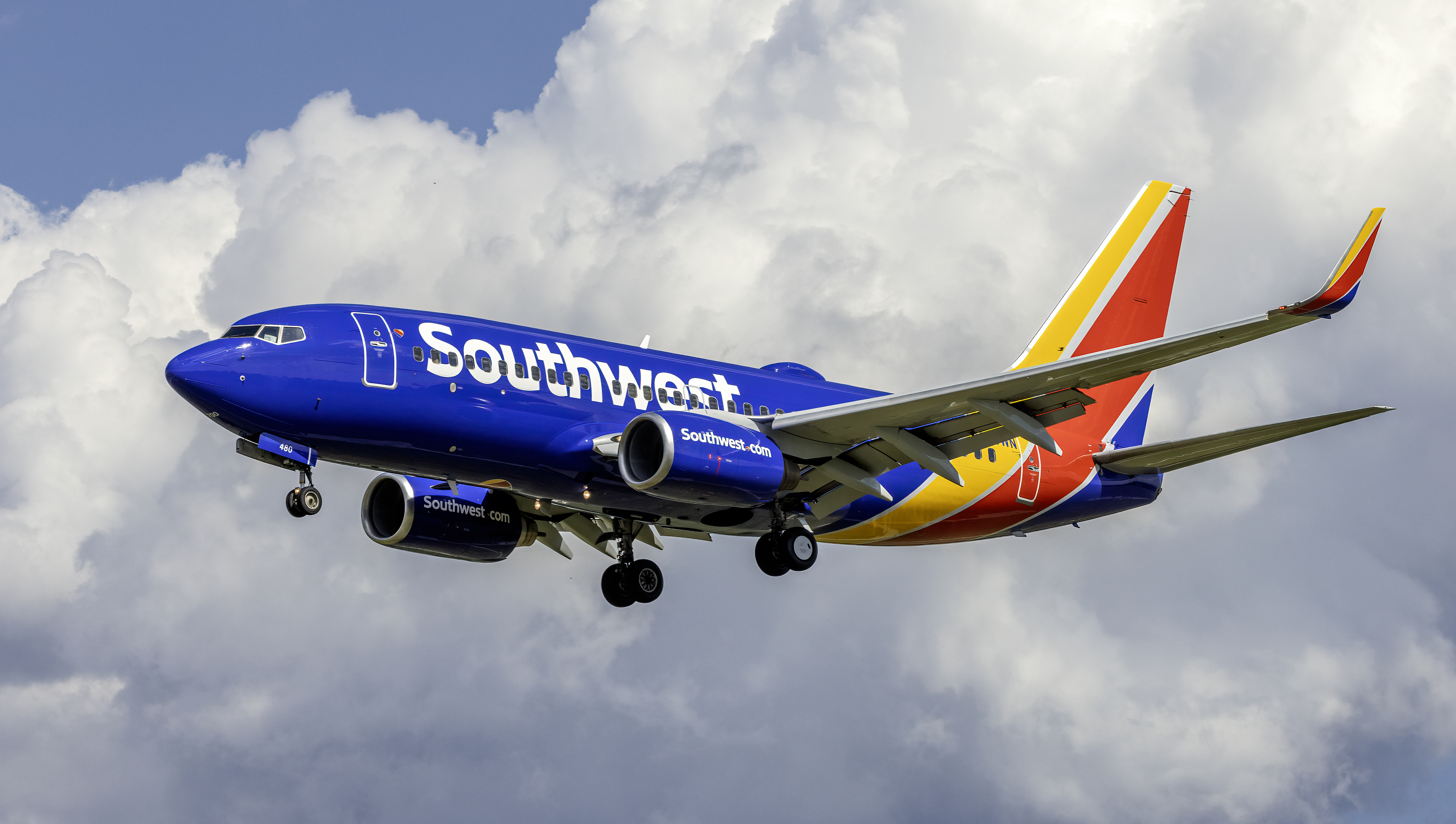
Southwest Airlines is the world's largest operator of the Boeing 737 Next Generation family.

As of June 2026, Southwest Airlines operates an all-Boeing 737 fleet with 803 aircraft, making it the fifth largest commercial airline fleet in the world and the largest 737 operator. Additionally, Southwest has over 400 Boeing 737 MAX aircraft on order. Southwest has only ever operated Boeing 737 aircraft, except for a brief period during the late 1970s and early 1980s, when they operated six Boeing 727-200 aircraft. The airline served as the launch customer of the 737-300, 737-500, 737-700, 737 MAX 7, and 737 MAX 8. The use of a single aircraft type across its fleet allows Southwest's pilots to operate any aircraft without restrictions, allows the company to stock fewer spare parts, and reduces training time and costs. Southwest Airlines aims to be an all 737 MAX-operator by 2031.

== Current fleet ==
As of September 2026, Southwest Airlines operates an all-Boeing 737 fleet composed of the following aircraft:

Aircraft	In service	Orders	Seats	Notes
Boeing 737-700	271	—	137	Launch customer and largest operator of the 737-700. To be retired by 2031 and replaced by Boeing 737 MAX.
Boeing 737-800	189	—	175	Launch customer and largest operator of the 737-700. To be retired by 2031 and replaced by Boeing 737 MAX.
Boeing 737 MAX 7	—	269	150	Launch customer. Expected to enter service in 2027. Replacing Boeing 737-700.
Boeing 737 MAX 8	343	167	175	Launch customer. Largest Boeing 737 MAX operator. Replacing Boeing 737-800.
Total	803	436		

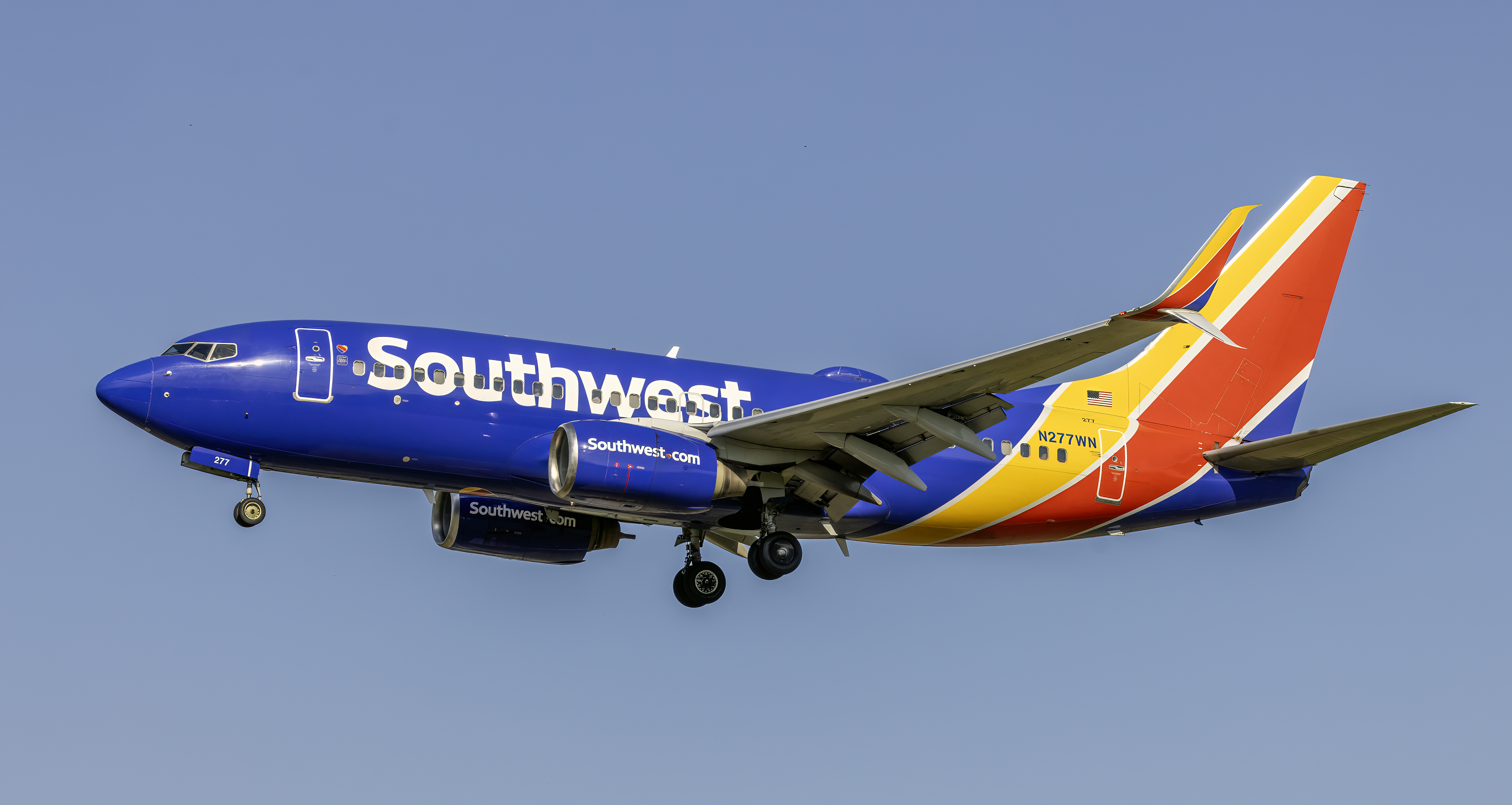
Boeing 737-700

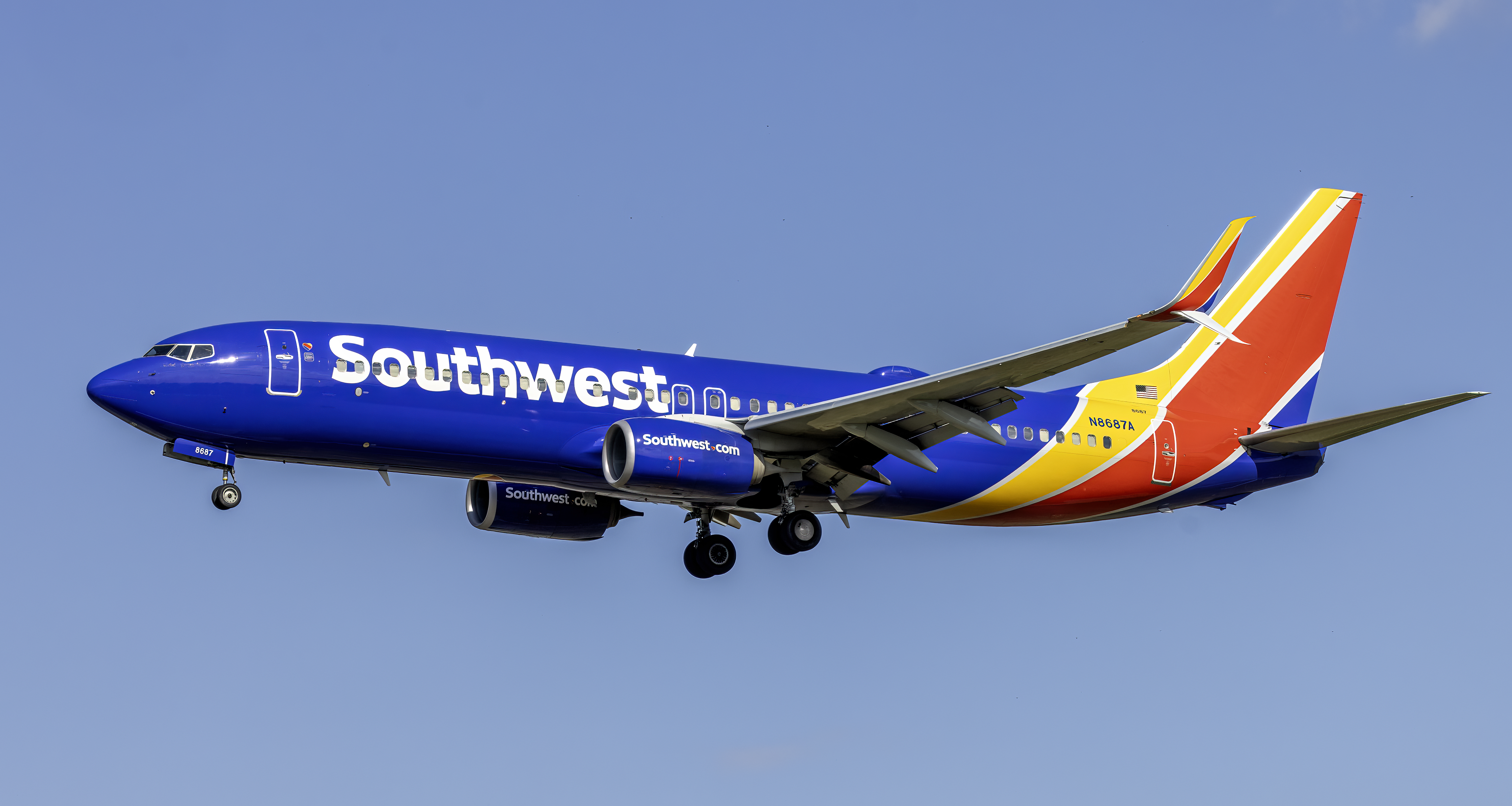
Boeing 737-800

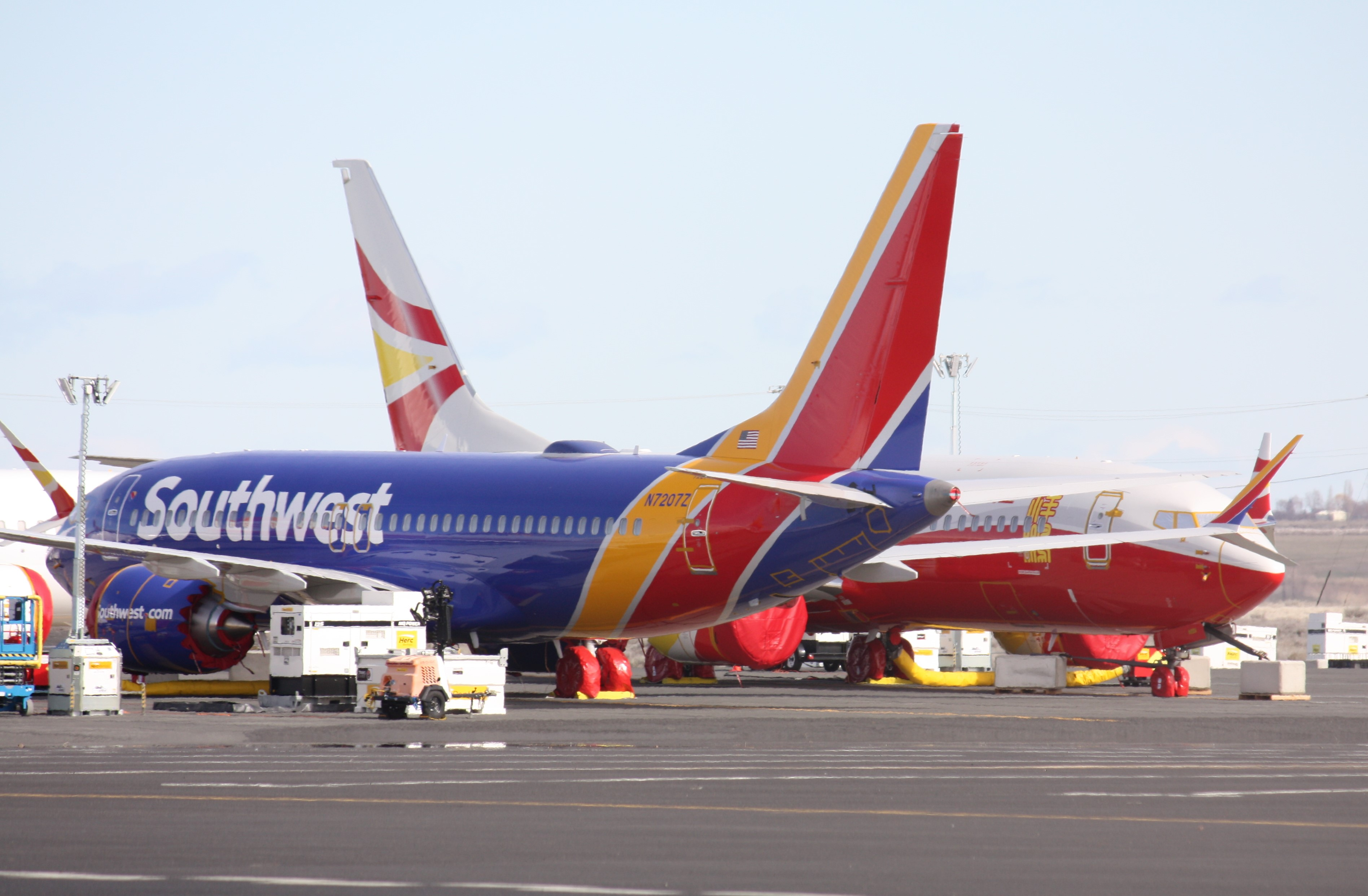
Boeing 737 MAX 7

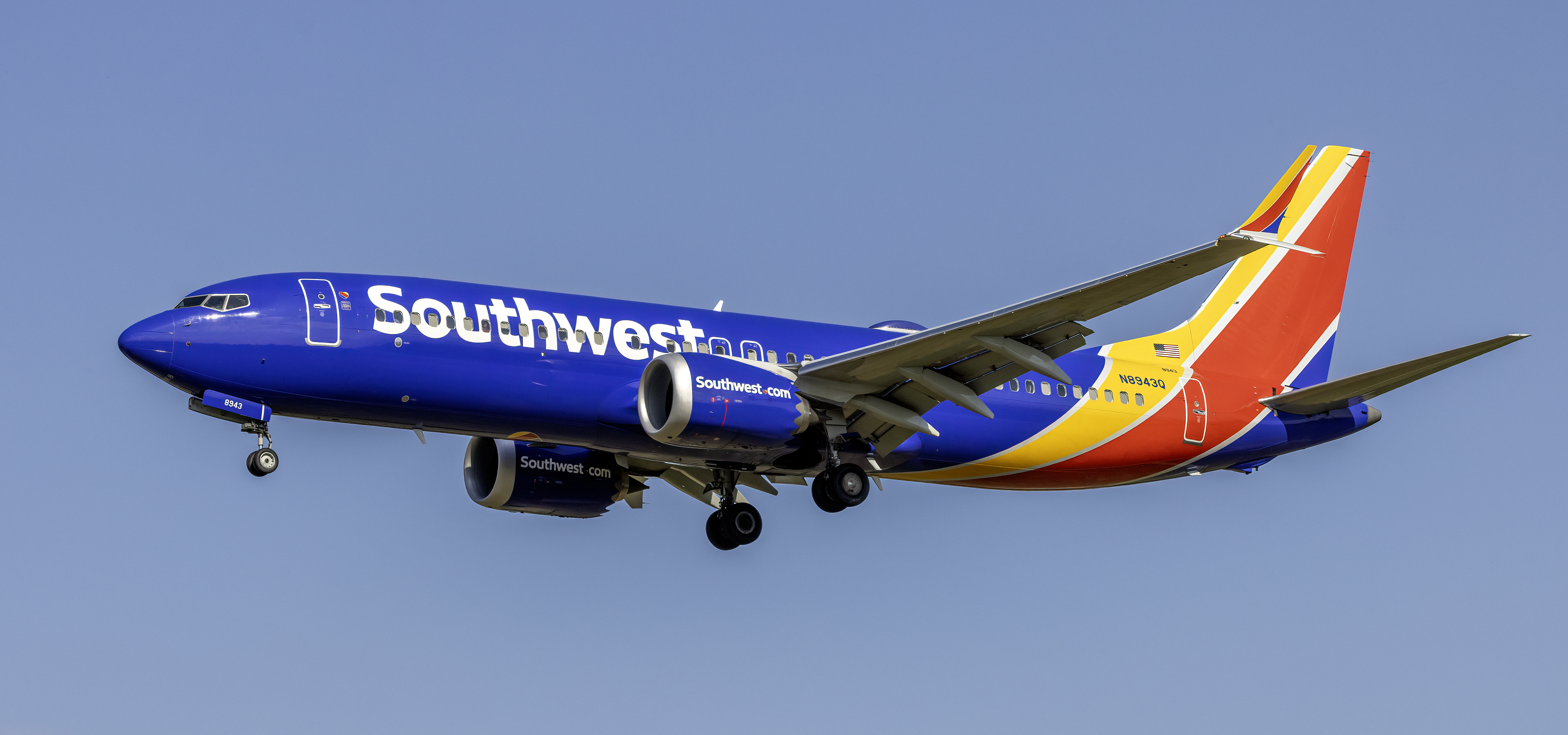
Boeing 737 MAX 8

== History ==
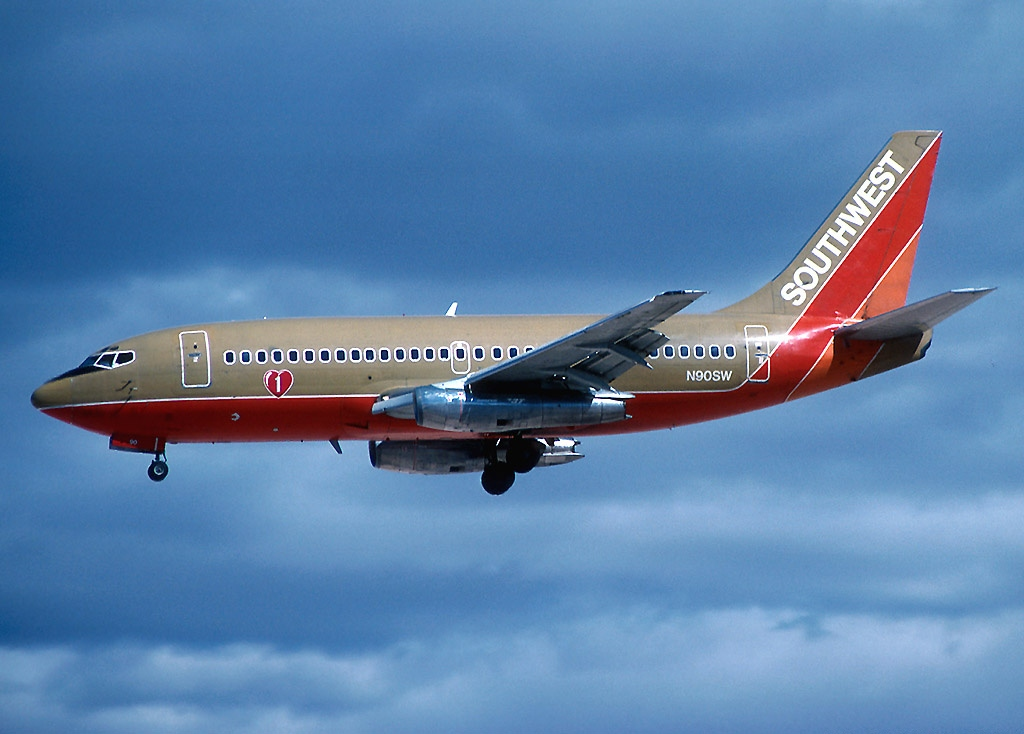
Boeing 737-200

=== Beginnings ===
Southwest Airlines began revenue flights on June 18, 1971, using three Boeing 737-200 aircraft. The airline operated the type exclusively during the airline's early history. These aircraft were not originally ordered by Southwest, but rather were delivery slots taken over from Air California, Aloha Airlines, and Pacific Southwest Airlines. After obtaining six aircraft in this manner, Southwest made its first all-new 737 order from Boeing for four aircraft in June 1976. These were also the airline's first 737-200 Advanced series aircraft, with aerodynamic enhancements and greater range than the original 737-200.

In early 2004, Southwest restored and donated the nose section of a retired 737-200, aircraft registration number N102SW, to the Frontiers of Flight Museum at Dallas Love Field. The aircraft had flown for Southwest from March 15, 1984, to January 23, 2004. Southwest retired its last active 737-200 from revenue service on January 17, 2005, however, one 737-200 was retained at Love Field until 2009 as a ground crew training aid.

=== 737 Classic ===
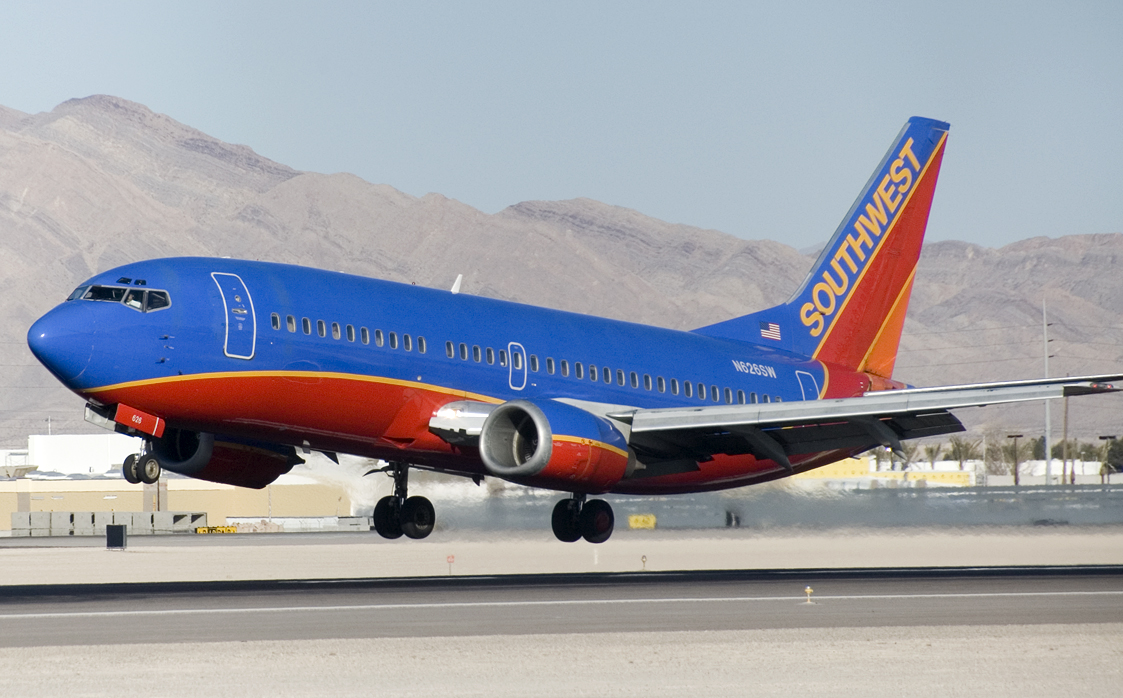
Boeing 737-300 Classic

Southwest was the first airline to operate the Boeing 737-300, which Boeing designed specifically to meet the needs of the airline, as the 737-200 proved to have inadequate range and load-carrying capacity to fly new Southwest routes between Texas and the western United States. The new aircraft had a longer range and seated more passengers than the 737-200, 137 versus 122, and was substantially quieter inside, particularly behind the wing. Most of the 737-300 fleet was later retrofitted with slimmer-profile seats, increasing passenger capacity to 143. Additional 737-300s were obtained from Morris Air when its operations were absorbed by Southwest in 1994. At one time, Southwest operated the largest 737-300 fleet in the world, with 195 aircraft. The first 737-300 to enter service, registration N300SW and manufacturer's serial number (msn) 22940, named "The Spirit of Kitty Hawk", first flew with Southwest on December 17, 1984. N300SW was retired by Southwest in April 2011 after 83,132 flight hours and 77,301 cycles. It has been restored and preserved at the Frontiers of Flight Museum, where it houses a historical exhibit. The last Southwest 737-300 revenue flight took place on September 29, 2017.

Southwest was the launch customer for the Boeing 737-500, a smaller, more efficient version of the 737-300. Introduced in 1990, the airliner seated 122 passengers — the same as the older 737-200 — but had increased fuel capacity and range. The 737-500 was purchased for newly-introduced, long-range routes with lower demand than the airline's established short-haul routes. However, as these routes grew in popularity, the lower seating capacity became a liability, and the 737-500 was shifted mostly to Southwest's original short-haul routes in Texas and its neighboring states. The airline retired its last 737-500 on September 5, 2016.

=== 737 Next Generation ===
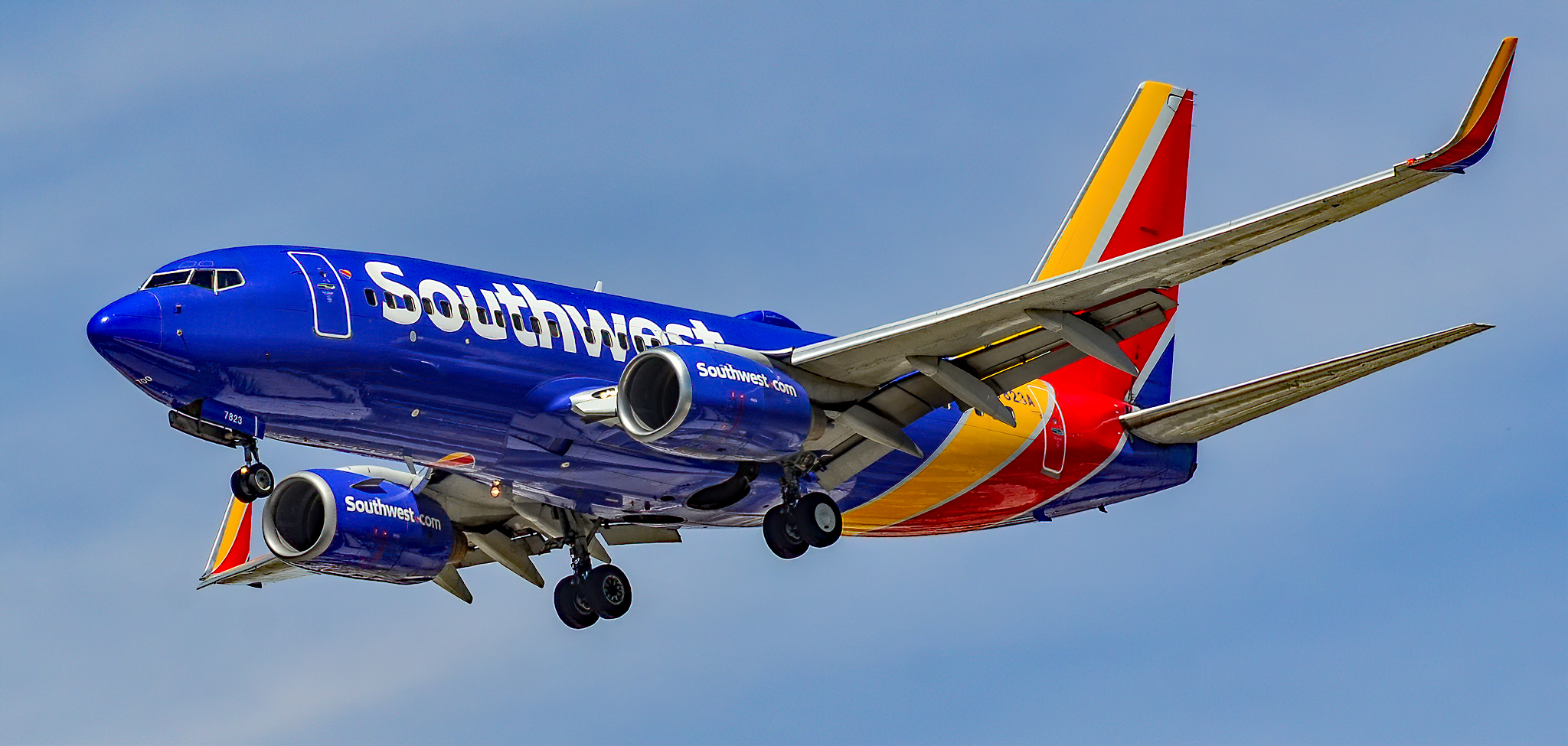
Boeing 737 Next Generation

The airline again became a 737 launch customer when it ordered the first Boeing 737 Next Generation aircraft in November 1993; Southwest took delivery of the first Boeing 737-700 on December 17, 1997. Southwest added the Boeing 737-800 to its fleet on April 11, 2012. The aircraft has 175 seats, 32 more than the former largest 737s in Southwest's fleet.

After completing the purchase of AirTran Airways, Southwest Airlines acquired AirTran's existing fleet of Boeing 717 aircraft. However, Southwest elected not to integrate them into its fleet and currently leases them to Delta Air Lines.

On October 1, 2018, Southwest Airlines took delivery of its final Boeing 737-800. All deliveries for the foreseeable future were expected to be Boeing 737 MAX variants. The airline expects to retire the entire 737 Next Generation fleet by 2031.

=== 737 MAX ===
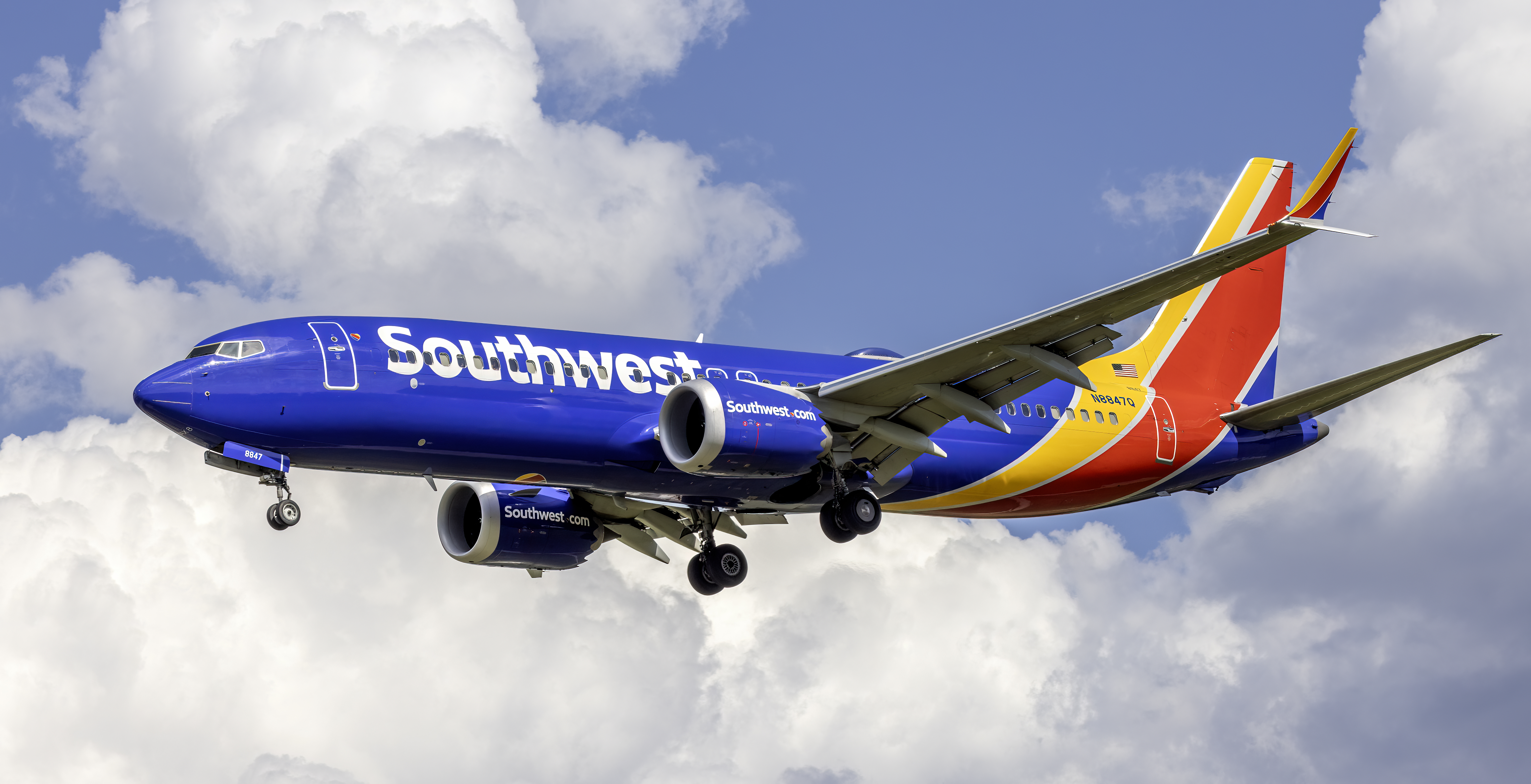
Boeing 737 MAX 8

On December 13, 2011, Southwest placed a firm order for 150 Boeing 737 MAX 8 aircraft, becoming the launch customer for the type (although the first delivery of the 737 MAX 8 was to Malindo Air).

On May 15, 2013, Southwest became the launch customer for the Boeing 737 MAX 7. The first delivery was expected in 2019, but was delayed due to the grounding of the 737 MAX.

On August 29, 2017, Southwest Airlines took delivery of its first Boeing 737 MAX 8, the first airline in North America to do so. The airline was also the first in North America to operate the aircraft on a scheduled revenue passenger flight on October 1, 2017. By April 2018, Southwest was the largest 737 MAX customer with 280 total orders for the MAX 8 variant, and 310 aircraft total for the 737 MAX family.

On March 13, 2018, Southwest Airlines took delivery of the 10,000th Boeing 737, setting the Guinness World Record for Boeing which started producing the 737 in January 1967. This beat the previous record of 5,000 set back in 2006. This will be flown under tail number N8717M. There is a special registration plate commemorating the milestone inside the L1 door.

In March 2020, in response to the sharp drop in air travel caused by the COVID-19 pandemic, Southwest indefinitely stored 50 737-700 aircraft at Southern California Logistics Airport. By April 28, Southwest had indefinitely grounded 350 of its 742 aircraft and delayed many 737 MAX deliveries, a move supported by Boeing because 737 MAX production was shut down due to the continued MAX groundings.

In November 2020, the FAA formally ended the 737 MAX grounding, and Southwest began the process of returning its 34 737 MAX aircraft to service and retraining all of its pilots. On March 11, 2021, Southwest resumed 737 MAX operation, becoming the fourth US airline to do so.

In October 2020, Southwest stated that it was considering alternatives to the MAX 7 to replace its 737-700s, with deliveries from 2025. However, in March 2021, Southwest announced an order for 100 MAX 7 jets with deliveries from 2022 and said that negotiations with Airbus were never initiated. By June 2021, Southwest converted several MAX 7 options into additional firm orders, anticipating that only MAX 7 aircraft would be delivered during 2022 through 2026. However, in July 2022, Southwest stated that MAX 7 type certification delays would likely postpone the first delivery until 2023 and that the airline would instead receive MAX 8 aircraft in the interim. Unfortunately, further delays of MAX 7 certification made Southwest assume no deliveries until 2026.

== Historical fleet ==
Southwest Airlines fleet history
Aircraft	Total	Introduction	Retired	Replacement(s)	Notes
Boeing 727-200	7	1978	1985	Boeing 737-300	Leased, not operated concurrently.
Boeing 737-200	54	1971	2005	Boeing 737-700	Southwest's first aircraft type.
Boeing 737-300	195	1984	2017	Boeing 737-700; Boeing 737-800; Boeing 737 MAX 8	Launch customer.
Boeing 737-500	25	1990	2016	Boeing 737-700; Boeing 737-800; Boeing 737 MAX 8	Launch customer.

== Livery/paint ==
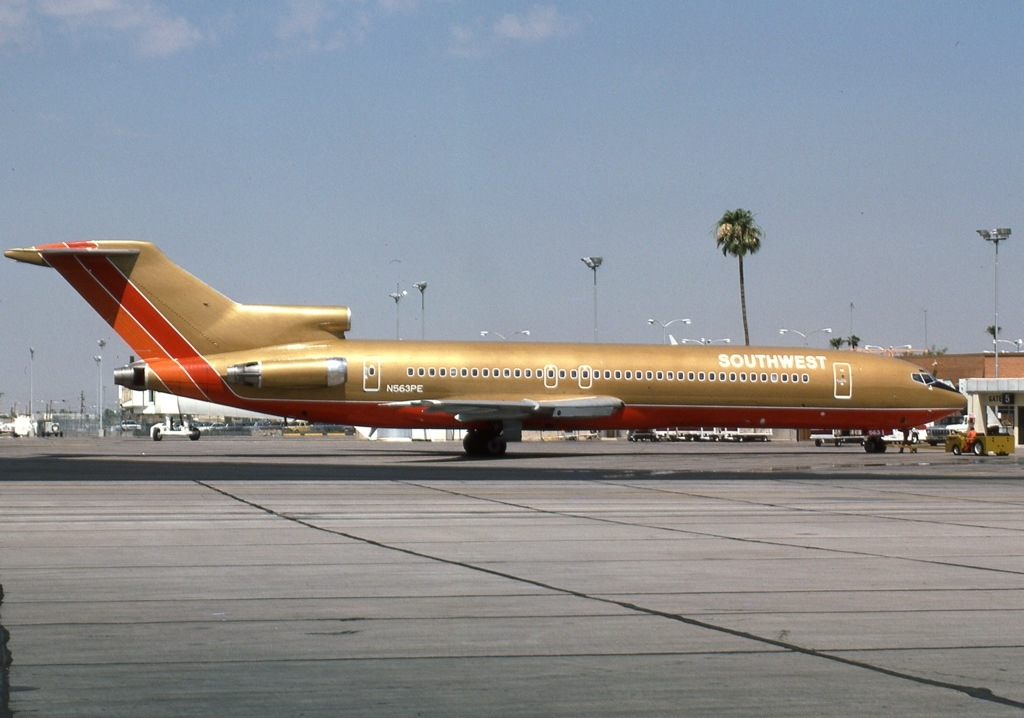
A leased Boeing 727-200

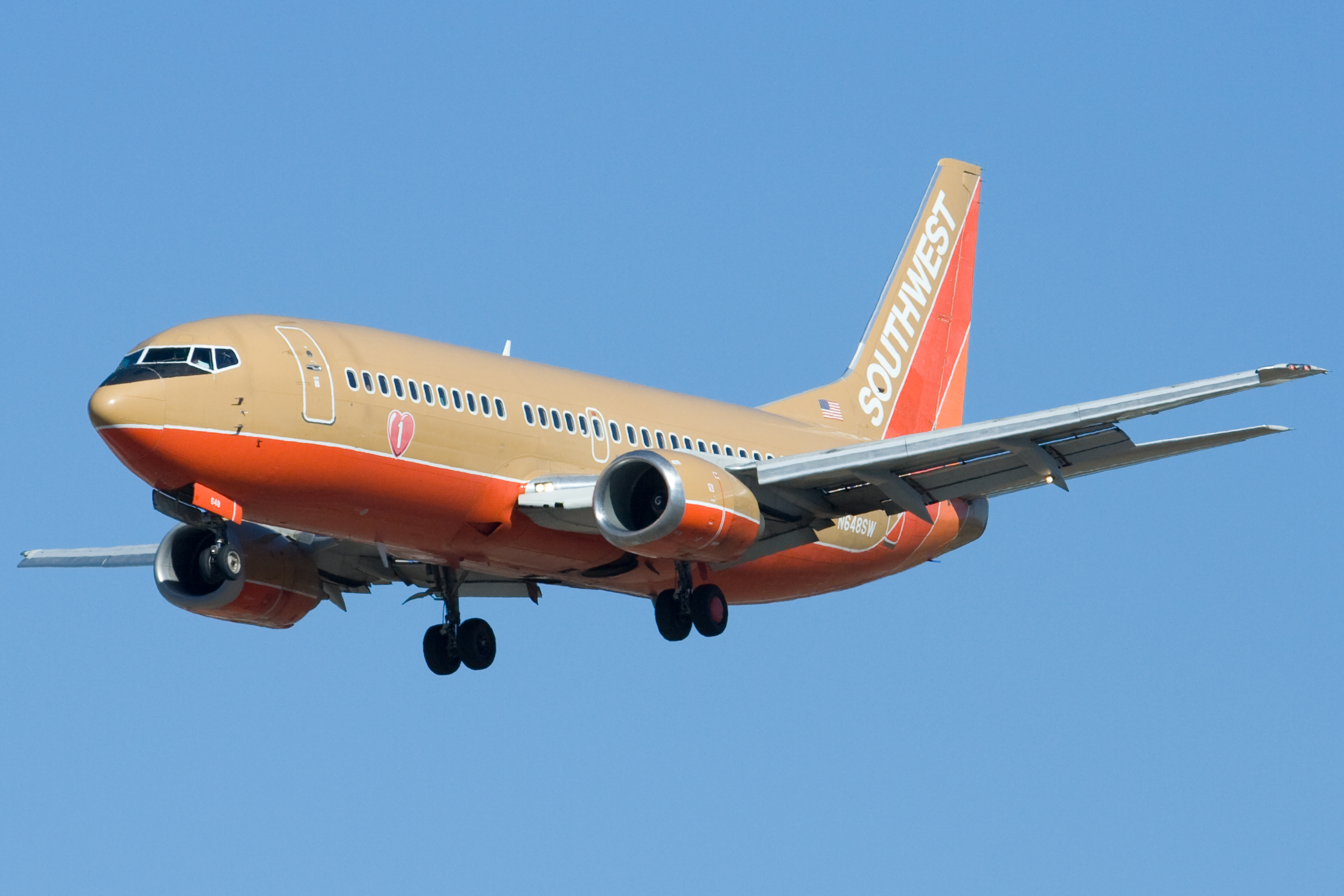
A Boeing 737-300 in 2007 wearing the original Desert Gold livery that was used until January 15, 2001, and still remains on a 737 MAX 8 in honor of founder Herb Kelleher

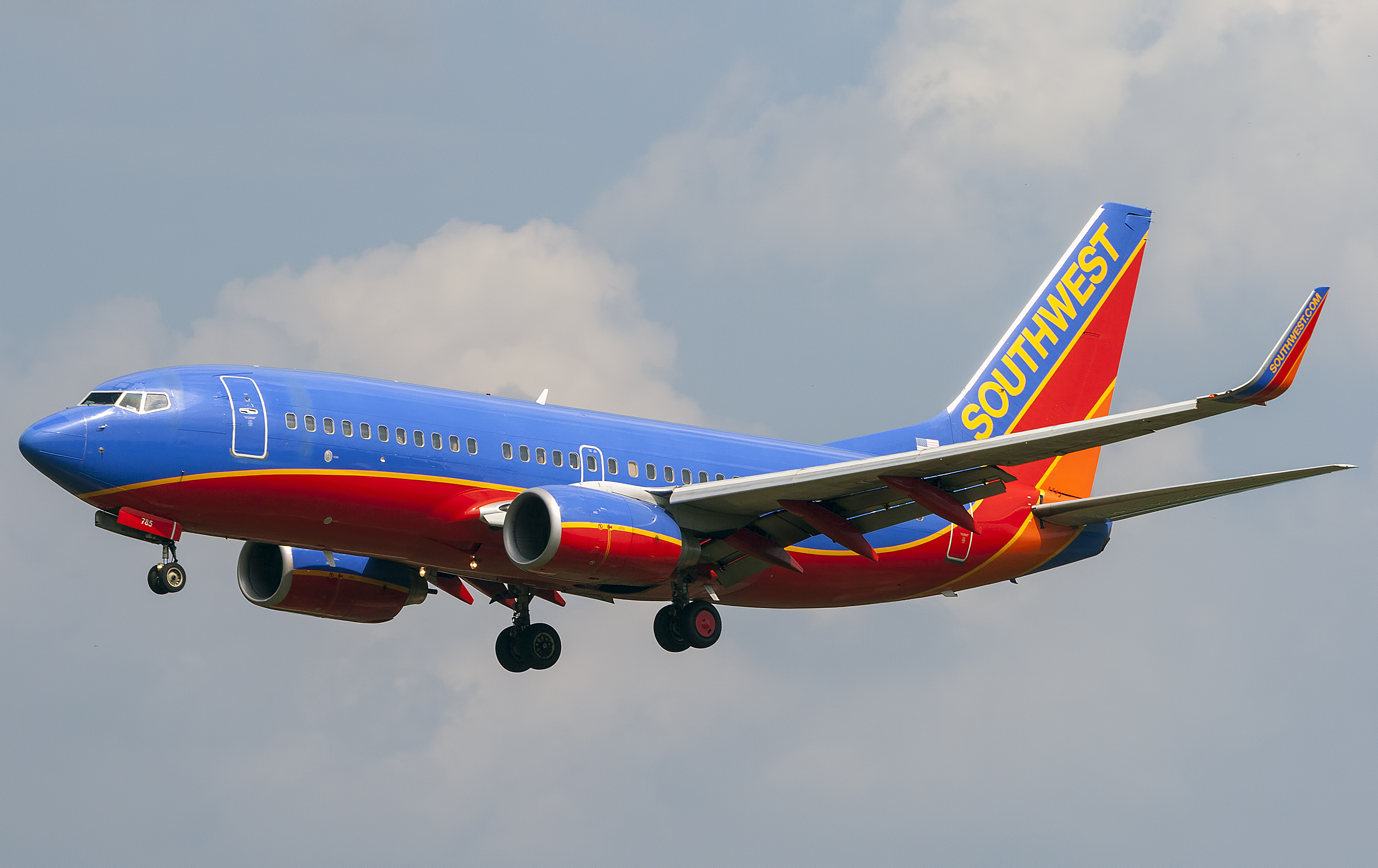
Canyon Blue livery used from 2001 to 2014 on a 737-700

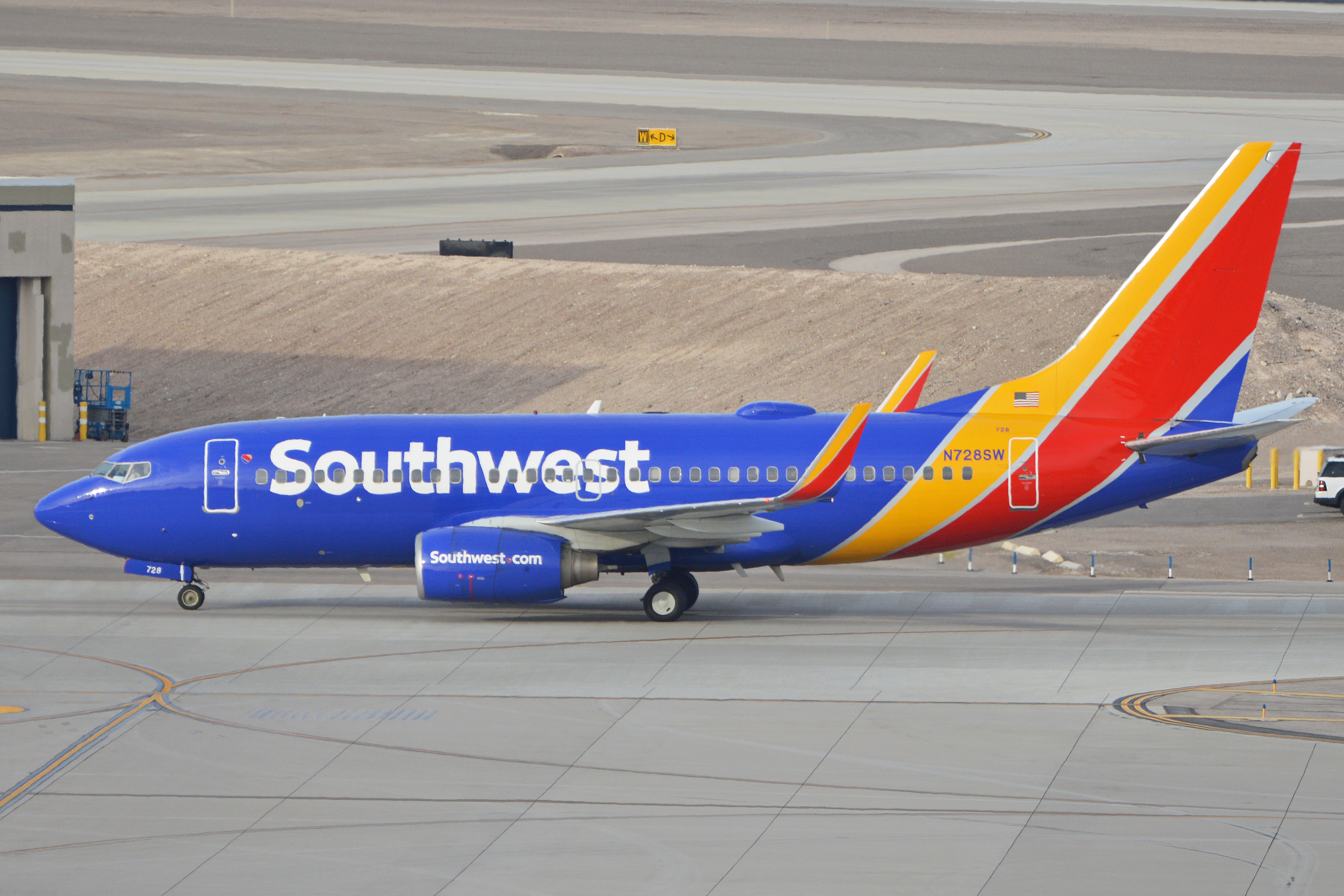
Heart livery used since 2014

Southwest's original primary livery was "Desert Gold" (Gold, Red and Orange, with pinstripes of white separating each section of color). The word Southwest appeared in white on the gold portion of the tail. On the original three 737-200s, from June 1971, on the left side of the aircraft, the word Southwest was placed along the upper rear portion of the fuselage, with the word Airlines painted on the tail N21SW. On the right side, the word Southwest was on the tail, but also had the word Airlines painted on the upper rear portion of the fuselage N20SW. This was later revised to simply include "Southwest" on both sides of the tail. The airline's Boeing 727-200s, operated briefly in the late 1970s and early 1980s, featured other variations on the livery; one was painted in a shade of ochre instead of gold with stylized titles on the forward fuselage and an "S" logo on the tail, while others bore the standard livery (albeit in metallic gold) with the word "Southwest" moved from the tail to the forward fuselage.

Southwest introduced the Canyon Blue livery on January 16, 2001, the first primary livery change in Southwest's then-30-year history. Spirit One was the first aircraft painted in the Canyon Blue fleet color scheme. That aircraft was N793SA, a Boeing 737-700. The second livery replaces the former primary color, "Desert Gold", with "Canyon Blue", and changes the Southwest text and pinstripes to gold. The orange and red stripes continued to be used. The pinstripe along the aircraft was drawn in a more curved pattern instead of the straight horizontal line separating the colors in the original. For aircraft equipped with blended winglets, the blended winglets were painted to include the text Southwest.com. Southwest completed repainting its entire fleet with the new "Canyon Blue" livery in early 2010; however, Classic Retro (N714CB, now retired), The Herbert D. Kelleher (N711HK, now retired), and Metallic Gold One (N792SW, the final aircraft delivered from Boeing in the original "Desert Gold" livery that is now repainted into the "Heart" livery), which are Boeing 737-700 aircraft, retained a simplified version of the original "Desert Gold" livery. One Boeing 737-200, registered N96SW, was painted into the Canyon Blue livery for unknown reasons.

A new livery, named "Heart" and developed with firms GSD&M, Lippincott, VML, Razorfish, and Camelot Communications, was unveiled on September 8, 2014. The new livery uses a darker shade of blue. The orange stripe on the tail is changed to yellow, and both the red and yellow stripes are now enlarged in reverse pattern. The belly of the aircraft is now in blue, and it features a heart, which has been a symbol for Southwest during its 43-year history. Additionally, the pinstripes are changed to a silver-gray. The Southwest text, now white, has been moved to the front of the fuselage. The lettering is in a custom font designed by Monotype, Southwest Sans. The web address was moved from the winglets to the engines. The dot in Southwest.com is now the new Heart logo featured on the belly of the aircraft. 99 percent of the fleet excluding special liveries are in the Heart Livery.

=== Special liveries and decals ===
Some Southwest Airlines aircraft feature special liveries or are named with special decals. Southwest gives these aircraft special names, usually ending in "One." All special liveries painted prior to Spirit One originally wore the standard Desert Gold, red and orange colors on the vertical stabilizer and rudder. Subsequent special liveries featured tails painted with the "Canyon Blue" livery, with all earlier specials repainted with the Spirit One livery tail. Any aircraft painted in special liveries will have their winglets painted white. Missouri One was the first special livery to feature a modified version of the "Heart" tail design, with the red and yellow ribbons shrunk in order to fit the Southwest wordmark as it cannot fit on the fuselage like on the other aircraft. Previous special livery aircraft are currently being repainted with the new "Heart" tail design.

Southwest Airlines' current and former special liveries
Active
Name	Year	Description	Registration	Photo
Arizona One	1994	The flag of the state of Arizona is applied across this aircraft.	N383SW (previous); N955WN (current)	
California One	1995	The flag of the state of California is applied across this aircraft.	N609SW (previous); N943WN (previous); N8653A (current)	
The Charles E. Taylor	2008	This aircraft is named in honor of Charles E. Taylor, the first aviation mechanic. He worked with the Wright Brothers and built the engine used on the Wright Flyer. This decal was previously applied on the nose of N289CT, an older Boeing 737-700, back in 2008. This decal was applied on the nose of N906WN, a newer Boeing 737-700, in 2013. N906WN is currently in the "Heart" livery.	N289CT (previous); N906WN (current)	
Colleen Barrett – Heroine of the Heart	2007	This aircraft wears special decals in honor of Colleen Barrett, President Emeritus of Southwest Airlines. In 2001, she became the first woman to hold the office of president at a major airline, and her leadership was crucial in the aftermath of the events of 9/11. Southwest was the only major airline to be profitable during the fourth quarter of that year, and one of the few that didn't have to lay off employees. This decal was applied on the nose of N266WN, a Boeing 737-700, in 2007. N872CB, a Boeing 737 MAX 8, replaced N266WN. It was delivered to Southwest in the "Canyon Blue" livery.	N266WN (previous); N872CB (current)	
Colorado One	2012	The flag of the state of Colorado is applied across this aircraft. N230WN is the 5,000th Boeing 737 ever produced. A special commemorative placard is placed on the top of the entry door frame of this aircraft. The tail was repainted into the new "Heart" colors in 2022, while the rest of the fuselage remained the same.	N230WN (previous); N8690A (current)	
The Donald G. Ogden	1981	This aircraft wears special decals in honor of Donald G. Ogden, Southwest Airlines' first Vice President of Flight Operations. He served from 1971 until his retirement in 1981. This decal was previously applied on the nose of N71SW, a Boeing 737-200, back in 1981. This decal was applied on the nose of N439WN, a Boeing 737-700, in 2003. N439WN is currently in the "Heart" livery.	N71SW (previous); N439WN (current)	
Florida One	2010	The flag of the state of Florida is applied across this aircraft. The tail was repainted into the new "Heart" colors in 2018, while the rest of the fuselage remained the same.	N945WN (previous) N9019R (current)	
Freedom One	2021	The flag of the United States of America is applied across this aircraft. This is Southwest's first Boeing 737-800 with a special livery.	N500WR	
The Gary C. Kelly	2026	This aircraft is dedicated to Gary C. Kelly, the former chairman and chief executive officer of Southwest Airlines.	N886GK	
The Herbert D. Kelleher	1978	This aircraft wears special decals in honor of Herbert D. Kelleher, the founder and Chairman Emeritus of Southwest Airlines, and it's one of two aircraft in the airline's fleet that's still painted in the original "Desert Gold" livery. The decal was first applied on the nose of N52SW, a Boeing 737-200, in 1978. The retro livery was painted on N365SW, a Boeing 737-300, in 1993, and on N711HK, a Boeing 737-700, in 2005. N711HK was retired in March 2022, and has been replaced by N871HK, a Boeing 737 MAX 8.	N52SW (previous); N365SW (previous); N711HK (previous); N871HK (current)	
Heroes of the Heart	1993	This aircraft wears special decals in honor of the many thousands of employees working to keep Southwest Airlines moving forward each and every single day. The original aircraft was dedicated to Southwest's 81 Station Administrative Coordinators. This decal was previously applied on the nose of N363SW, a Boeing 737-300, back in 1993. This decal was applied on the nose of N938WN, a Boeing 737-700, in 2010. N938WN is currently in the "Heart" livery.	N363SW (previous); N938WN (current)	
Illinois One	2008	The flag of the state of Illinois is applied across this aircraft. N918WN, a Boeing 737-700, was returned to the lessor and was repainted white in 2020. Throughout 2021, N918WN sat in the desert of the Southern California Logistics Airport in Victorville, California. N918WN was later bought by Avelo Airlines in 2022, and it was re-registered as N707VL. N8619F, a Boeing 737-800, was painted in the "Illinois One" livery in September 2022.	N918WN (previous); N8619F (current)	
Imua One	2023	This aircraft is dedicated to the employees of Southwest and communities in the state of Hawaii who have welcomed Southwest Airlines with open arms. The eight central visual elements on this aircraft hold significance in both the state of Hawaii and Southwest Airlines. This is Southwest's first Boeing 737 MAX 8 with a state-themed livery.	N8710M	
Independence One	2026	A special livery celebrating the 250th Anniversary of the United States, in partnership with America250. The words "Life, Liberty, and the pursuit of happiness" are displayed on both sides of the fuselage.	N1776R	
The Jack Vidal	1995	This aircraft wears special decals in honor of Jack Vidal, Southwest's first Vice President of Maintenance. This decal was previously applied on the nose of N601WN, a Boeing 737-300, back in 1995. This decal was applied on the nose of N956WN, a Boeing 737-700, in 2017. N956WN is currently in the "Heart" livery.	N601WN (previous) N956WN (current) N8564Z (current)	
Liberty One	2026	This aircraft, like Freedom One, displays the flag of the United States across the aircraft.	N8719Q	
Lone Star One	1990	The flag of the state of Texas is applied across this aircraft. This livery was previously applied to N352SW, a Boeing 737-300, back in 1990. N352SW was also Southwest's first-ever aircraft to be painted into a state flag. After N352SW was retired in 2016, the "Lone Star One" livery was painted onto N931WN, a Boeing 737-700, two months later. N931WN was repainted into the heart livery in early 2024. Shortly after, N8660A was re-painted into Lone Star One, on a Boeing 737-800, and now holds that paint.	N352SW (previous); N931WN (previous); N8660A (current)	
Louisiana One	2018	The flag of the state of Louisiana is applied across this aircraft.	N946WN (previous); N8977G (current)	
Maryland One	2005	The flag of the state of Maryland is applied across this aircraft. The tail was repainted into the new "Heart" colors in 2021, while the rest of the fuselage remained the same.	N214WN	
Missouri One	2015	The flag of the state of Missouri is applied across this aircraft. N280WN was previously painted in the "Penguin One" livery until Southwest ended their partnership with SeaWorld.	N280WN	
Nevada One	1999	The flag of the state of Nevada is applied across this aircraft. After N727SW was retired in November 2022, the "Nevada One" livery was painted onto N8646B, a Boeing 737-800, in May 2023.	N727SW (previous); N8646B (current)	
New Mexico One	2000	The flag of the state of New Mexico is applied across this aircraft. The tail of N781WN, a Boeing 737-700, was repainted into the new "Heart" colors in 2018, while the rest of the fuselage remained the same. After N781WN was retired in June 2023, the "New Mexico One" livery was painted onto N8655D, a Boeing 737-800, just one month later.	N781WN (previous); N8655D (current)	
The Rollin W. King	1980	This aircraft wears special decals in honor of Rollin W. King, the co-founder of Southwest Airlines. This decal was previously applied on the nose of N67SW, a Boeing 737-200, back in 1980. This decal was applied on the nose of N417WN, a Boeing 737-700, in 2001. N417WN is currently in the "Heart" livery.	N67SW (previous) N417WN (previous) N8766T (current)	
Silver One	1996	This aircraft wears special decals in celebration of Southwest's 25th anniversary. N629SW, a Boeing 737-300, was originally polished bare metal, but it was later painted silver for easier maintenance. It was then repainted with a silver metallic paint. This aircraft also featured silver seats, which were replaced to conform with the rest of the fleet for simplicity. Silver One also featured silver heart-shaped drink stirrers. N629SW was eventually repainted into the standard "Canyon Blue" livery due to the dull appearance of the silver paint. Southwest Airlines felt that the Silver One livery did not fit the company's bright and cheerful personality. The Silver One logo remained on the nose of N629SW, but the silver interior was replaced with the standard blue and tan interior. After N629SW was retired in 2017, the Silver One decal was applied on the nose of N953WN, a Boeing 737-700, in 2018. N953WN is currently in the "Heart" livery.	N629SW (previous); N953WN (current)	
The Spirit of Hope	2004	This aircraft wears special decals in honor of the 30th Anniversary of the first ever Ronald McDonald House. On the interior of this aircraft, the overhead bins are covered in artwork from kids at a Ronald McDonald House in Washington State. N443WN is currently in the "Heart" livery.	N443WN N8844Q	
Tennessee One	2016	The flag of the state of Tennessee is applied across this aircraft. N922WN, a Boeing 737-700, was repainted into the standard "Heart" livery in April 2021 due to paint issues with the "Tennessee One" livery.	N922WN (previous); N8620H (previous); N8555Z (current)	
Triple Crown One	1997	This aircraft wears special decals on the nose, and a large heart-shaped medallion in "Desert Gold" colors is painted over the top and each side of air fuselage. The aircraft is dedicated to the company's employees for achieving five consecutive "Triple Crowns". This is a term that was conceived by Southwest for its having been shown in the U.S. Dept. of Transportation's published airline performance data as having the best on-time performance, least lost/damaged baggage, and fewest customer complaints for a given year. Southwest's consecutive run was from 1992–1996. The overhead bins in the interior of Triple Crown One were inscribed with the names of all 24,113 employees that worked for Southwest at the time, in honor of their part in winning the award. This livery was previously applied to N647SW, a Boeing 737-300, back in 1997. After N647SW was retired in 2015, the "Triple Crown One" livery was painted onto N409WN, a Boeing 737-700, two months later. N409WN in early 2024 was repainted into the standard heart livery. N8681M was selected to get the special livery soon after, and was repainted into the livery in March 2024, entering service in the new livery on March 20, 2024.	N647SW (previous); N409WN (previous); N8681M (current)	
Warrior One	2012	This aircraft was named in salute of the Southwest employees’ Warrior Spirit, as this was the first ever Boeing 737-800 to enter service with Southwest Airlines. The aircraft was repainted in the “Heart” livery in 2018, with the decal being reapplied in 2022. The decal was permanently removed from N8301J in 2026, and it is now on another Boeing 737-800.	N8301J (previous) N8549Z (current)	

Retired
2,000th Boeing 737 Next-Gen	2006	Southwest Airlines received the 2,000th Boeing 737 Next-Gen produced on July 26, 2006. Special decals are marked on the nose of the a Boeing 737-700, as well as a commemorative placard that is featured on the top of the entry door frame. As of August 2022, N248WN has been repainted into the "Heart" livery, but no longer contains the logo.	N248WN	N248WN 737-700 (2000th Next Gen) at SNA Gate 19. Friday, October 13, 2017
500th Boeing 737	2007	Southwest Airlines received its 500th Boeing 737 on June 28, 2007. Special decals are marked on the nose of N281WN, a Boeing 737-700. A dedication to Southwest's loyal customers is also applied on the right side cabinet at the front entry door of aircraft. As of October 2021, N281WN has been repainted into the "Heart" livery, but no longer contains the logo.	N281WN	
35th Anniversary	2006		N238WN	
Beats One	2015	This aircraft had decals that looked like Beats Headphones to make it look like the plane was wearing them. This aircraft was also used to promote Apple's streaming subscription service on Southwest's WiFi-equipped aircraft. The headphones were removed from N909WN in 2016.	N909WN	
Classic Retro	2007	This aircraft, a Boeing 737-700, was one of two aircraft in the airline's fleet that was still painted in Southwest's original "Desert Gold" livery.	N714CB	
Coco One	2017	This aircraft had decals promoting the premiere of Disney/Pixar's Coco. N7816B was eventually repainted back into the standard "Heart" livery.	N7816B	
Disney World 50th Anniversary	2021	Southwest Airlines partnered with Disney in celebration of the companies' 50th anniversaries. This aircraft, in addition to the special livery, featured Disney's logo and its characters inside the cabin on the window shades and overhead bins. The Southwest 50 years logo was also applied on some of the overhead bins. N954WN was eventually repainted back into the standard "Heart" livery.	N954WN	
Heart One & Two	2014	These were the first two aircraft painted in Southwest’s “Heart” livery, the new primary livery for Southwest Airlines effective September 8, 2014.	N8642E N8645A	
Kidd's Kids	2014	This aircraft had decals celebrating the 25th Anniversary of the Kraddick Foundation. Thanks to the generosity of the viewers of The Kidd Kraddick Morning Show, 54 kids and their families went to Disney World on the Kidd's Kids plane (N905WN).	N905WN	
Live In The Vineyard	2012	These aircraft had special decals that promoted Southwest's partnership with Live In The Vineyard, a Country Music Festival. All four Boeing 737-700s eventually had the decals removed. All four planes were repainted into the standard "Heart" livery,	N240WN; N241WN; N950WN; N798SW	
Metallic Gold One	2007	This was the last ever aircraft delivered to Southwest in the original "Desert Gold" livery. N792SW was repainted into the "Heart" livery in 2016.	N792SW	
Penguin One	2013	To commemorate the 25th Anniversary of Southwest Airlines' partnership with SeaWorld, this aircraft was painted to look like penguins, and advertisements for SeaWorld were displayed on the overhead bins inside the plane. After Southwest's partnership with SeaWorld came to an end, N280WN was repainted into the "Missouri One" livery.	N280WN	
Shamu One, Shamu Two, and Shamu Three	1988	Five aircraft (a Boeing 737-300, two 737-500s, and eventually, two 737-700s) were painted to look like an Orca. Advertisements for SeaWorld were displayed on the overhead bins inside each plane. (Note: Subsequent to the retirement of Southwest's 737-200s, the 737-500s began to stay within a smaller geographic area formerly operated by the 737-200s and as such, Sea World was no longer getting the optimal national exposure from these two aircraft. Consequently, the livery was applied to the two 737-700s in 2005. The artwork on the nose of each aircraft stated "Shamu", and ads for Sea World were displayed on the overhead bins.) N334SW was retired in 2012. N507SW and N501SW were retired in 2016. N713SW and N715SW were repainted into the standard "Heart" livery following the end of Southwest's partnership with SeaWorld.	N334SW (One) (Boeing 737-300); N507SW (Two) (Boeing 737-500); N501SW (Three) (Boeing 737-500); N713SW (Two) (Boeing 737-700); N715SW (Three) (Boeing 737-700)	
Shark Week	2016	These aircraft had special decals that were promoting Discovery Channel's Shark Week during the Summer of 2016. Both planes were eventually repainted back into the standard "Heart" livery.	N422WN N944WN	
Shark Week 30th Anniversary	2018	These aircraft were dedicated to commemorate the 30th Anniversary of Shark Week on Discovery Channel. Five different Boeing 737-700s had giant decals of different species of sharks during the Summer of 2018 – Hammerhead Shark (N705SW), Mako Shark (N961WN), Great White Shark (N470WN), Bull Shark (N947WN), and Tiger Shark (N553WN). All five planes were eventually repainted back into the standard "Heart" livery.	N705SW; N961WN; N470WN; N947WN; N553WN	
Slam Dunk One	2005	A basketball was superimposed on the sides of the aircraft, and a different NBA team logo was placed on each overhead bin in the cabin, recognizing Southwest's partnership with the NBA. On October 11, 2010, Southwest Airlines and the NBA ended their partnership, and N224WN was repainted back into the "Canyon Blue" livery. N224WN is now currently in the "Heart" livery.	N224WN	
Spirit One	2001	This was Southwest's 30th Anniversary aircraft, and the first ever aircraft painted into the "Canyon Blue" livery. N793SA was repainted into the "Heart" livery in 2016.	N793SA	
Sports Illustrated One	2009	A large decal of Sports Illustrated Swimsuit Issue cover model Bar Refaeli adorned the fuselage of N922WN for the month of February 2009. This aircraft was repainted into the "Tennessee One" livery in February 2016. As of April 2021, N922WN has been repainted into the standard "Heart" livery.	N922WN	
The June M. Morris	1994	This aircraft honored June M. Morris, the founder of Morris Air. Her signature and the Morris Air logo were implemented on the nose of N607SW, a 737-300. This aircraft was officially retired on August 14, 2017. The final flight for N607SW was into DAL-VCV for storage prior to disposition.	N607SW	
The Nolan Ryan Express	1999	This aircraft had a commemorative sticker dedicated to famous Texas pitcher Nolan Ryan, who is the MLB's all-time strikeout leader with 5,714 strikeouts. After N742SW was repainted into the standard "Heart" livery, the decal remained on the nose of the plane for a short while, but the decal was eventually removed.	N742SW	
The Spirit of Kitty Hawk	1984	The first three Boeing 737-300 aircraft delivered to Southwest Airlines (N300SW, N301SW, and N302SW) had a special decal implemented on the nose that read The Spirit of Kitty Hawk. All three planes have been retired since 2017. N448WN, a 737-700, was delivered on the 100th Anniversary of the Wright Brothers' first flight. As of 2018, the decal that reads The Spirit of Kitty Hawk is no longer implemented on the nose of N448WN, as it has been repainted into the standard "Heart" livery.	N300SW (Boeing 737-300); N301SW (Boeing 737-300); N302SW (Boeing 737-300); N448WN (Boeing 737-700)	
Tinker Bell One	2008	This aircraft included the logo of the Tinker Bell movie, and a special decal that read "Powered by Pixie Dust." N912WN is currently in the "Heart" livery.	N912WN	

== See also ==
- Alaska Airlines fleet
- American Airlines fleet
- Delta Air Lines fleet
- United Airlines fleet
