= Point-to-point transit =

Transportation systems traveling directly from source to destination without a hub

Point-to-point (top) vs hub-and-spoke (bottom) networks

Point-to-point transit is a transportation system in which a plane, bus, or train travels directly to a destination, rather than going through a central hub. This differs from the spoke-hub distribution paradigm in which the transportation goes to a central location where passengers change to another train, bus, or plane to reach their destination.

== Use in airlines ==
The point-to-point model is used widely by low-cost carriers, including Allegiant Air and Southwest Airlines in the U.S., and European carriers such as Ryanair, easyJet and Wizzair, along with some low-cost carriers in Asia like AirAsia, Lion Air and VietJet Air, for example. Many such airlines sell each flight leg independently and have no concept of round-trip ticketing or connecting flights so baggage must be collected and rechecked even to transfer between flights booked at the same time on the same airline. Although there are many point-to-point airlines, most have at least a "homebase" airport where most flights originate or depart. The United States airport system was point-to-point, controlled by CAB, until deregulation in the late 1960s and early 1970s. After the 1978 Airline Deregulation Act, the hub concept became prevalent. With the advent of low-cost carriers, point-to-point air transport increased. Some full-service network carriers operate the point-to-point model alongside the hub-and-spoke system for certain high-density routes between focus cities. In Europe, for example, most traditional full-service airlines operate seasonal point-to-point service outside their hubs to serve Mediterranean and Alpine holiday resorts.

== Advantages ==
- It eliminates the need for connections the majority of the time.
- It considerably reduces travel time.
- It considerably reduces risk of baggage loss or baggage arriving much later than the passenger, as baggage is not transferred as fast as passengers.
- Total fuel and pollution per passenger is lower: a passenger flying directly from Brussels to San Francisco will burn less fuel than flying via London or New York.
- Without the need to satisfy connections for passengers, trips in a point-to-point system are less interdependent, but the operational constraints of needing to have sufficient equipment and personnel in each location at the right time to satisfy the timetable remain. That minimizes the risk of the domino effect in which the delayed arrival of one trip into a place leads to delayed departures of the (often) multiple trips with which its passengers had to make connections, cascading delays through the network. Therefore, a point-to-point system is less prone to delays.
- It has proven advantageous in the air cargo industry in which freight is carried in the unused baggage hold space on passenger flights ("belly cargo"). Traditionally, large cargo aircraft are scheduled to fly between large hubs so freight often has to be forwarded on by additional flights or by rail or road. Belly cargo carried point to point can be delivered closer to its final destination.

== Disadvantages ==
- If a desired origin–destination pair is not served, passengers will have to make a connection as in the hub model or travel by another mode of transportation. Low-cost carriers typically do not facilitate or honor connections, even if the consecutive flights are operated by that carrier and arrive and depart from the same airport.
- The frequency of trips may be reduced because the number of origin–destination pairs is orders of magnitude larger.
- In the event of major weather events or system malfunctions, it is more difficult to isolate problems to a single part of the country. One example was the 2022 Southwest Airlines scheduling crisis.

== See also ==
- Spoke-hub distribution paradigm (alternative shipping model)
- Direct flight
