= Southwest Airlines =

Airline of the United States

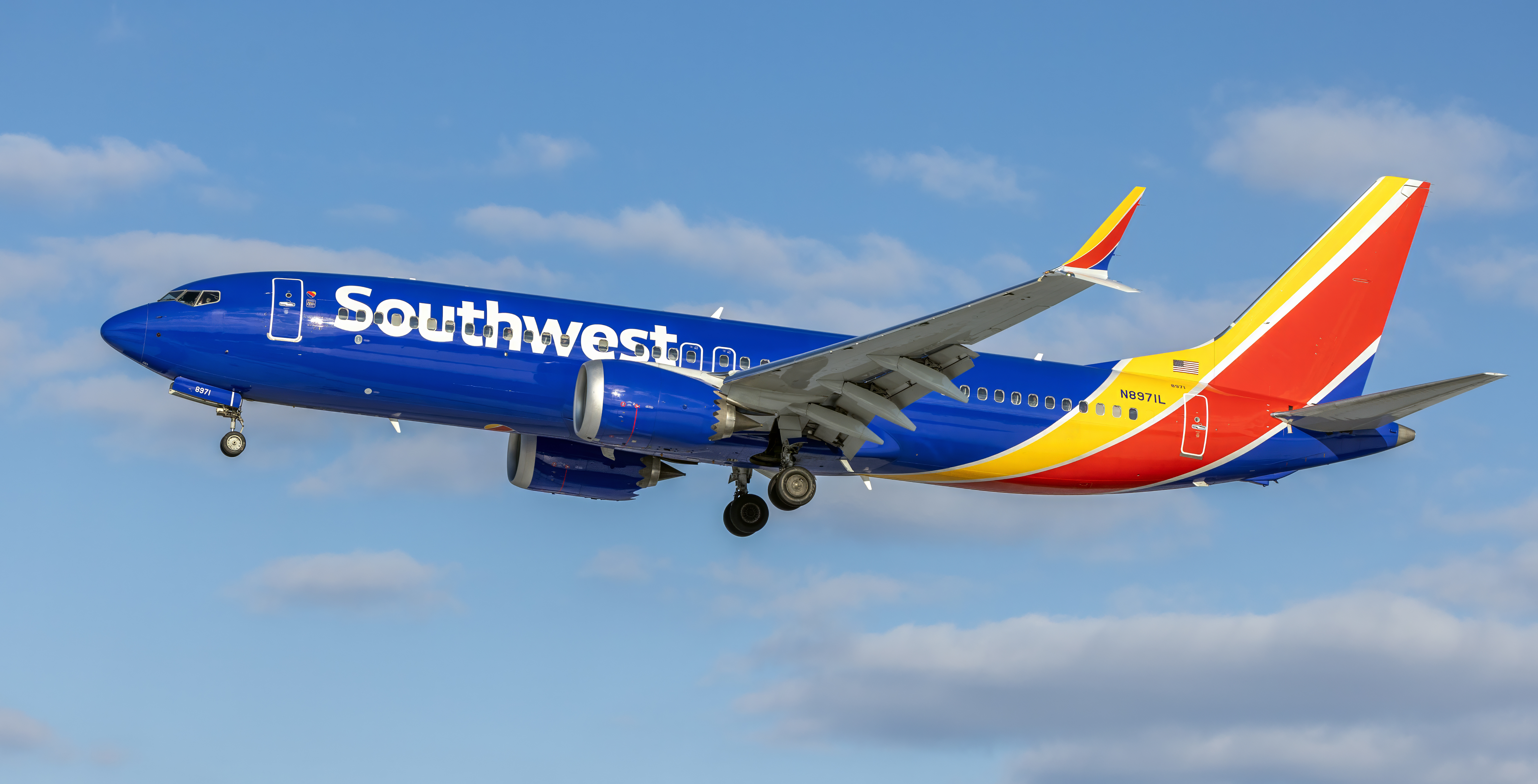
- A Southwest Airlines Boeing 737 MAX 8
IATA	ICAO	Call sign
WN	SWA	SOUTHWEST
- Founded: March 9, 1967; 59 years ago (as Air Southwest)
- Commenced operations: June 18, 1971; 55 years ago (as Southwest Airlines)
- AOC #: SWAA304A
- Operating bases: Atlanta; Austin; Baltimore; Chicago–Midway; Dallas–Love; Denver; Houston–Hobby; Las Vegas; Los Angeles; Nashville; Oakland; Orlando; Phoenix–Sky Harbor
- Frequent-flyer program: Rapid Rewards
- Fleet size: 803
- Destinations: 117
- Traded as: NYSE: LUV; DJTA component; S&P 500 component
- Headquarters: Love Field, Dallas, Texas, U.S.
- Key people: Bob Jordan (president and CEO); Doug Brooks (chairman)
- Founders: Herb Kelleher; Rollin King
- Revenue: ▲US$28.1 billion (2025)
- Operating income: ▲US$428 million (2025)
- Net income: ▼US$441 million (2025)
- Total assets: ▼US$29.1 billion (2025)
- Total equity: ▼US$7.98 billion (2025)
- Employees: 72,790 (2025)
- Website: www.southwest.com

Southwest Airlines is a low-cost airline in the United States. It is headquartered in the Love Field neighborhood of Dallas, Texas. It is the fourth-largest airline in North America when measured by passengers carried, as of 2024. With its all-Boeing 737 fleet, Southwest serves over 100 destinations in 42 states, Washington, D.C., Puerto Rico, and ten other countries and territories near the southern United States in the Gulf of Mexico and Caribbean Sea regions: Aruba, the Bahamas, Belize, the Cayman Islands, Costa Rica, Cuba, the Dominican Republic, Mexico, Jamaica, and Turks and Caicos Islands.

The airline was established on March 9, 1967, by Herb Kelleher and Rollin King as Air Southwest Co. and adopted its current name, Southwest Airlines Co., in 1971, when it began operating as an intrastate airline wholly within the state of Texas, first flying between Dallas, Houston, and San Antonio. It began regional interstate service in 1979, expanding nationwide in the following decades.

== History ==
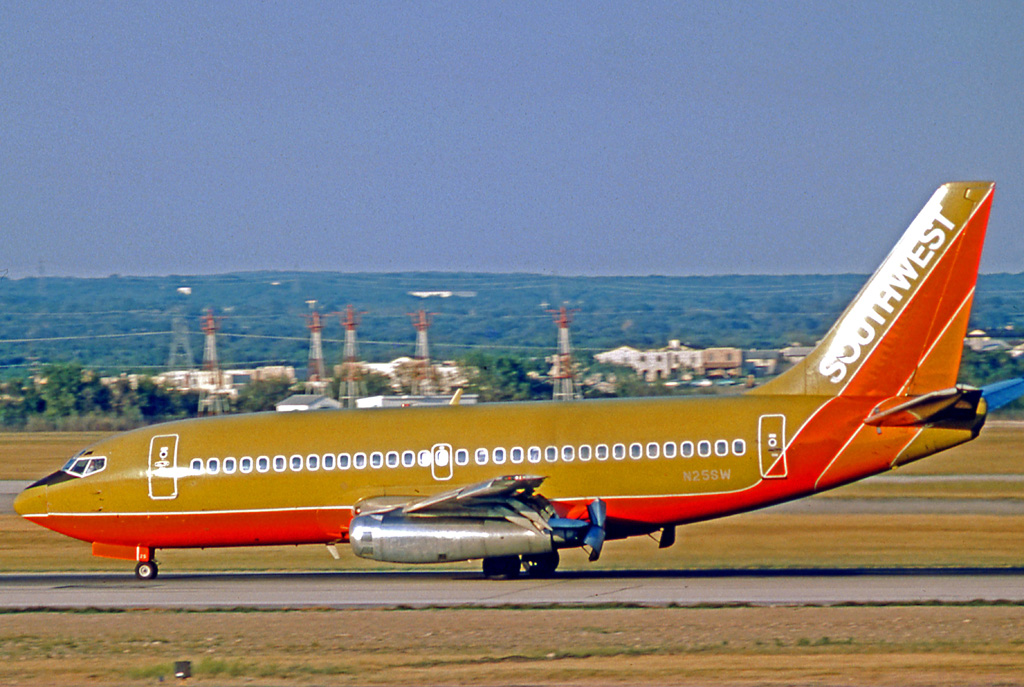
Boeing 737-200 in original livery in 1975

Southwest Airlines was founded in 1966 by Herbert Kelleher and Rollin King, and incorporated as Air Southwest Co. in 1967. The company planned to operate as an intrastate airline, flying a Texas Triangle network between Dallas, Houston, and San Antonio. By flying only within the state of Texas Southwest would be exempt from regulation by the federal Civil Aeronautics Board, allowing it to undercut the prices of competitors. Three other airlines (Braniff, Trans-Texas, and Continental) sued to prevent the company from starting up. The lawsuits were resolved in 1970, and in 1971 the airline changed its name to Southwest Airlines. In 1975, Southwest began flying to other cities in Texas, and in 1979, after passage of the Airline Deregulation Act, it began flying to adjacent states. It started service to the East and the Southeast in the 1990s, and Denver in 2006, which is now its most popular destination. Southwest Airlines was profitable for 47 consecutive fiscal years, from 1973 through 2019.

Southwest Airlines encountered significant operational and financial difficulties in the 2020s, notably during the holiday meltdown in 2022 when it canceled over 15,000 flights. This event, caused by severe weather and outdated scheduling systems, led to a record $140 million fine from the U.S. Department of Transportation, and losses exceeding $1.1 billion. Elliott Investment Management, an activist hedge fund, capitalized on Southwest's vulnerabilities by acquiring more than 10% of the company's shares, advocating for leadership and operational changes to improve profitability. A settlement between Southwest and Elliott in October 2024 resulted in former CEO Gary Kelly stepping down as executive chairman and five Elliott-backed directors joining the board; however, CEO Bob Jordan remained despite Elliot's efforts to oust him. Under new oversight, Southwest initiated major changes, including its first-ever layoffs affecting approximately 15% of employees, ending its popular two free checked bags policy on May 28, 2025, transitioning to assigned seating beginning in 2026, introducing premium seating and basic fare options, adding red-eye flights, limiting flight credit validity to one year, listing flights on third-party platforms like Expedia and Google Flights, and establishing a codeshare partnership with Icelandair.

== Destinations ==
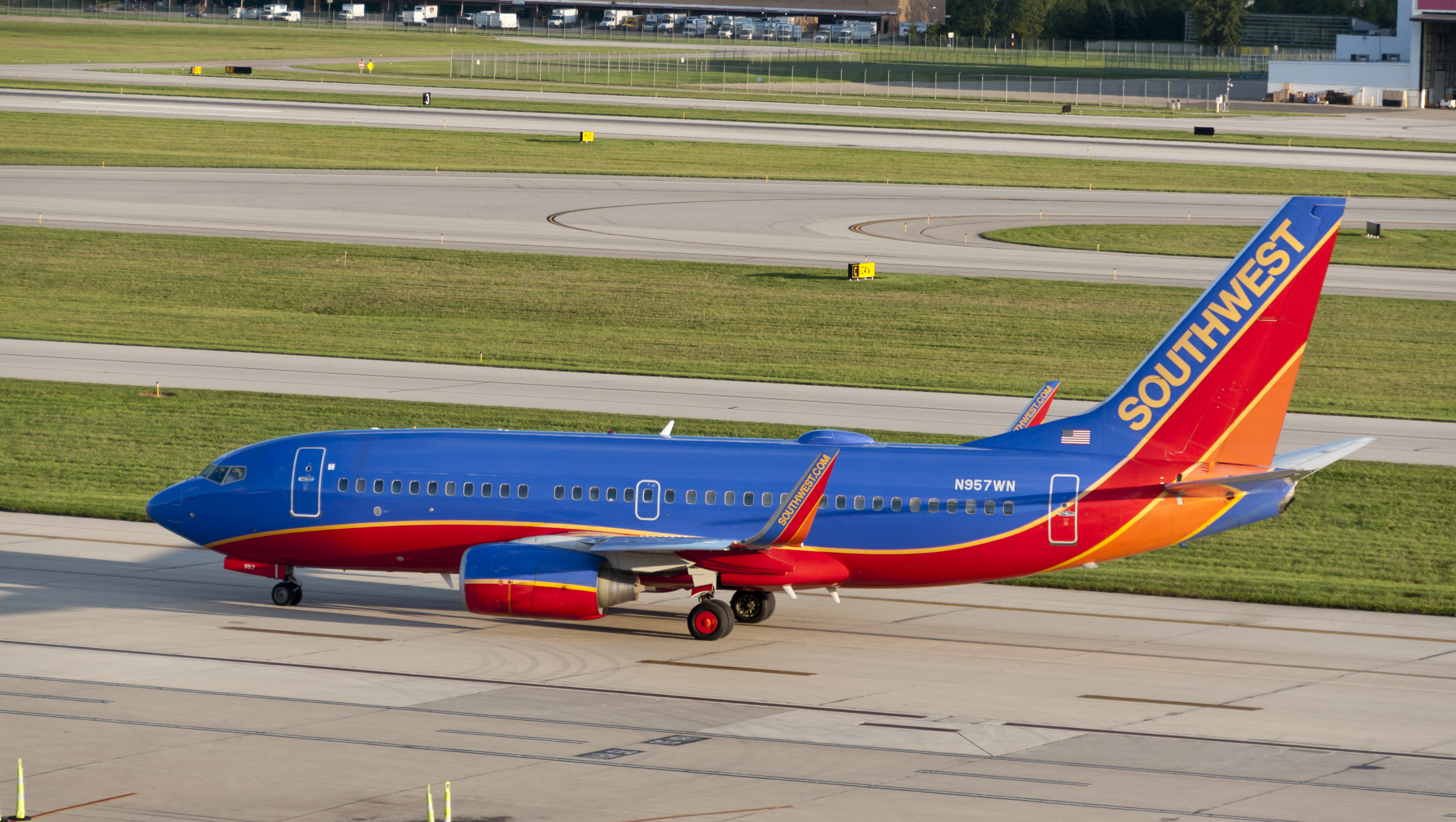
A 737-700 of Southwest in their Canyon Blue livery

Southwest uses a point-to-point system combined with a rolling-hub model in its base cities, in contrast to the hub-and-spoke system of other major airlines. As of June 2026, Southwest Airlines flew to over 100 destinations in 43 states, Puerto Rico, Mexico, Central America, and the Caribbean. This system means that the airline has no real hubs, but rather some airports with more destinations than others.

=== Interline agreements ===
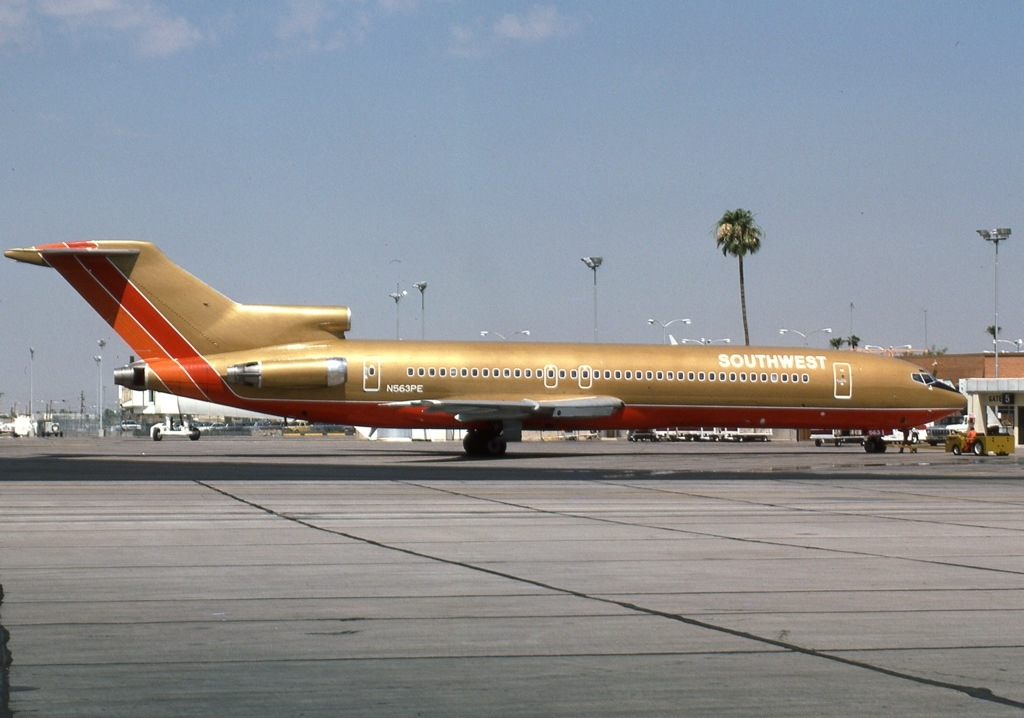
The 727 pictured along with others were leased from other airlines and were eventually retired in 2000.

Southwest currently has interline agreements with the following airlines:

- Air Premia
- All Nippon Airways
- China Airlines
- Condor
- EVA Air
- Icelandair
- Polish Airlines LOT
- Philippine Airlines
- Singapore Airlines
- Turkish Airlines

== Fleet ==
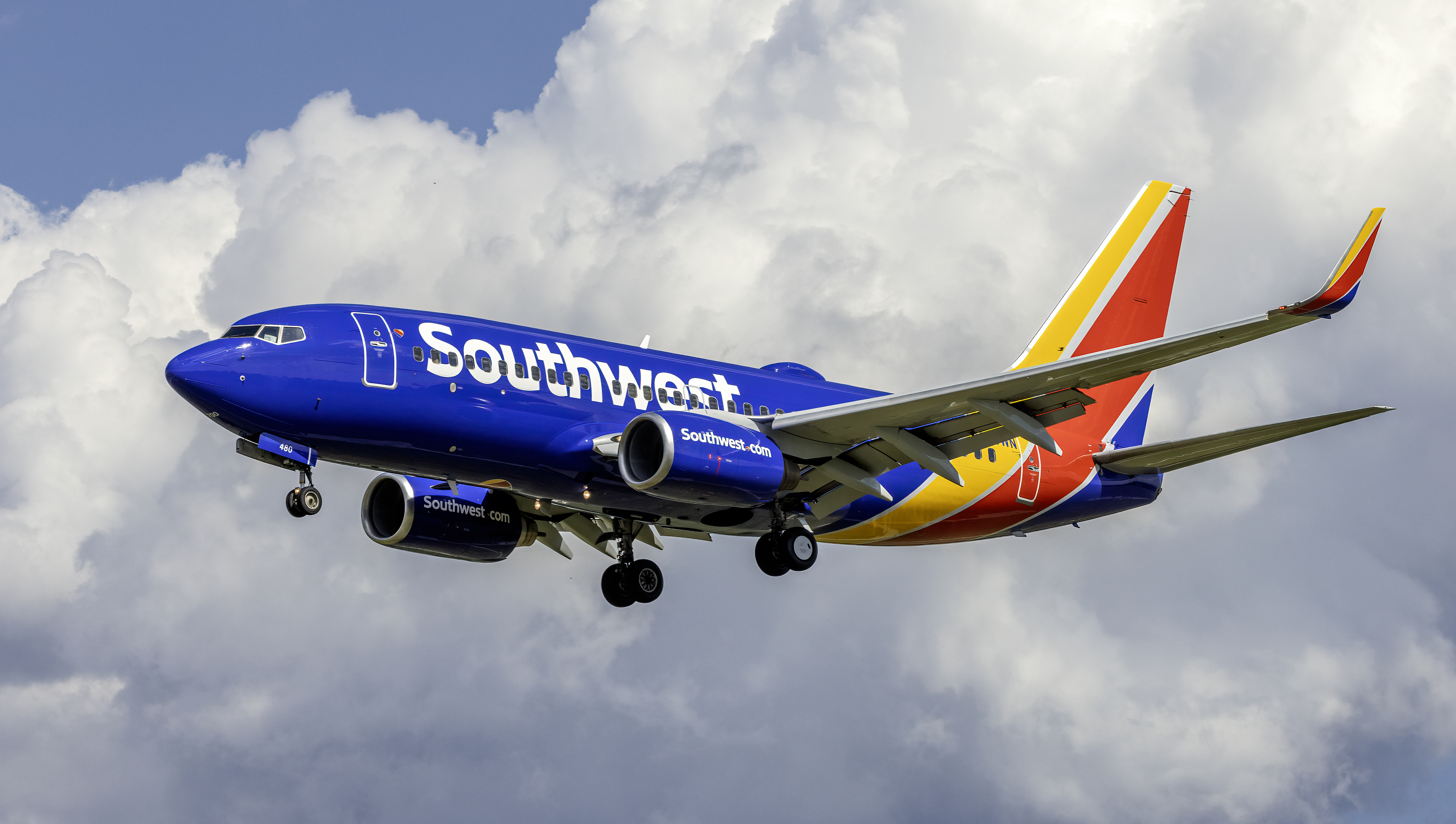
Southwest Airlines is the world's largest operator of the Boeing 737 Next Generation family.

As of June 2026, Southwest Airlines operates an all-Boeing 737 fleet with 803 aircraft, making it the fifth largest commercial airline fleet in the world and the largest 737 operator. Additionally, Southwest has over 400 Boeing 737 MAX aircraft on order. Southwest has only ever operated Boeing 737 aircraft, except for a brief period during the late 1970s and early 1980s, when they operated six Boeing 727-200 aircraft. The airline served as the launch customer of the 737-300, 737-500, 737-700, 737 MAX 7, and 737 MAX 8. The use of a single aircraft type across its fleet allows Southwest's pilots to operate any aircraft without restrictions, allows the company to stock fewer spare parts, and reduces training time and costs. Southwest Airlines aims to be an all 737 MAX-operator by 2031.

== Passenger experience ==
Southwest Airlines offers a single-class cabin with economy and extended legroom seating and does not operate separate business or first-class cabins.

The airline provides complimentary light snacks and non-alcoholic beverages on all flights, with alcoholic drinks available for purchase. Complimentary alcoholic beverages are offered on select holidays, including Valentine's Day, St. Patrick's Day, the airline's June 18 anniversary, and Halloween. Southwest does not sell full meals on board.

The airline has become known for informal and sometimes humorous onboard announcements.

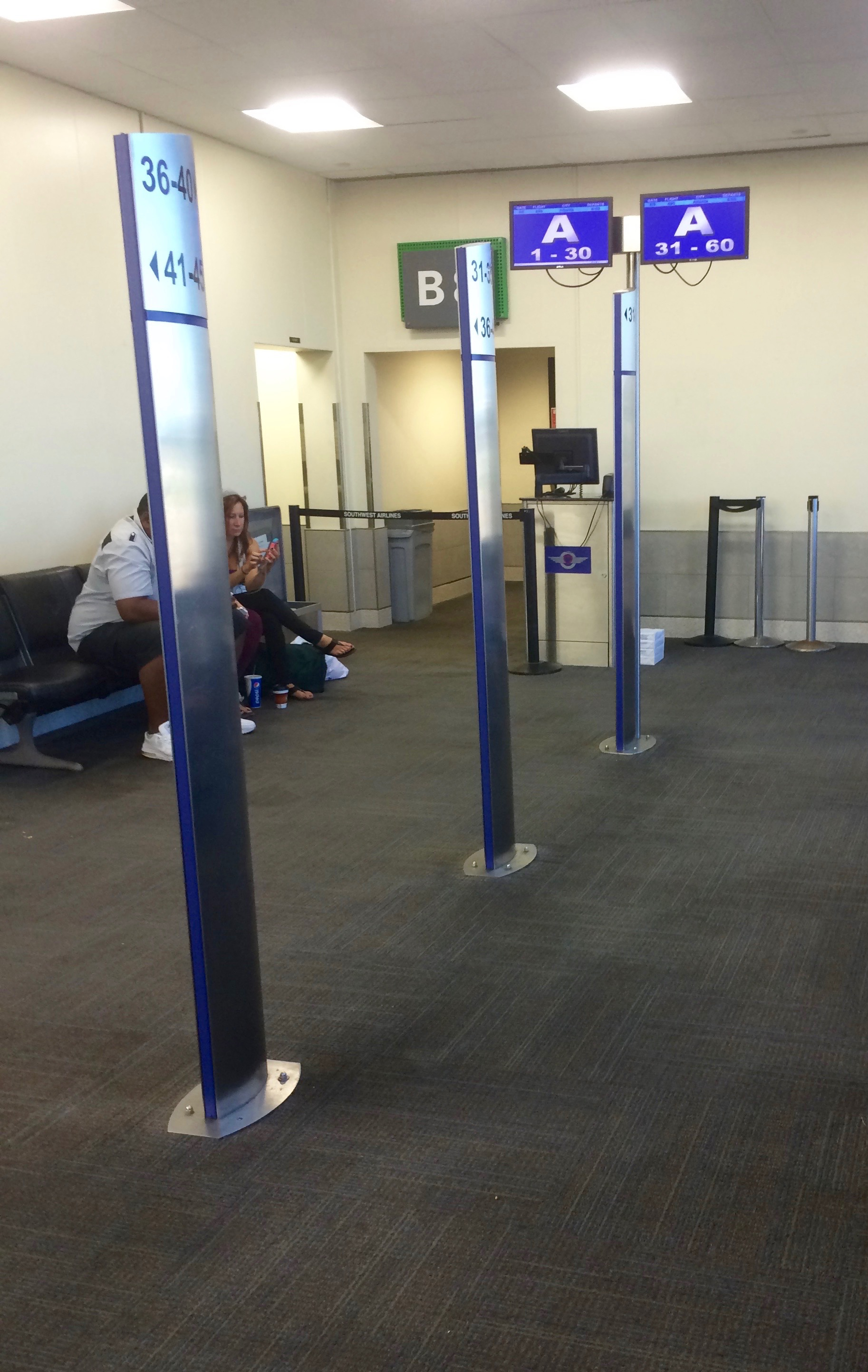
Airport gate boarding area for Southwest's now-abandoned open seating process

Until January 26, 2026, Southwest used an open seating policy in which passengers were assigned a boarding group (A, B, or C) and a number, and selected any available seat upon boarding. A 2012 episode of MythBusters found the process to be faster on average than conventional boarding methods. Assigned seating was introduced beginning January 27, 2026, with passengers grouped by seat location at boarding. Beginning in May 2025, the airline introduced extra-legroom seating in the first rows and at exit doors on Boeing 737-800 and 737 MAX 8 aircraft as part of a phased cabin update.

Southwest maintains a "customer of size" policy under which passengers requiring additional space may purchase a second seat.

=== In-flight entertainment ===
Southwest provides complimentary Wi-Fi access to members of its Rapid Rewards program. After connecting, passengers can access the onboard entertainment portal on their personal devices, which includes a flight tracker, on-demand movies, and live television. Beginning in summer 2026, the airline plans to deploy Starlink satellite-based high-speed internet across its fleet.

=== Rapid Rewards ===
Southwest introduced a frequent-flyer program, The Company Club, on June 18, 1987, awarding credits based on trips flown rather than distance. The program was renamed Rapid Rewards in 1996. Under the original structure, members earned one credit per one-way flight; 16 credits within 24 months qualified for a free round-trip ticket valid for one year.

On March 1, 2011, Rapid Rewards transitioned to a revenue-based points system in which members earn and redeem points according to ticket price and fare type. The revision eliminated blackout dates and seat restrictions. Since October 18, 2019, points do not expire provided the member remains active.

== Corporate affairs ==
=== Business trends ===
The key trends for Southwest Airlines are (as of the end of the calendar year):

Key business trends
Year	Net income (in million US$)	Employees (FTE)	Passengers (in millions)	Load factor (%)	Avg. fare (US$)	Aircraft (Note: At the end of the year)	Ref.
2015	2,181	49,583	118	83.6	154	704	
2016	2,183	53,536	124	84.0	152	723	
2017	3,357	56,110	130	83.9	151	706	
2018	2,465	58,803	134	83.4	151	750	
2019	2,700	60,767	134	83.5	154	770	
2020	−3,074	56,537	54	52.4	141	718	
2021	977	55,093	99	78.5	141	728	
2022	539	66,656	126	83.4	169	770	
2023	465	74,806	137	80.0	172	817	
2024	465	72,450	140	80.4	178	803	
2025	441	72,790	134	77.4	190	803	

=== Headquarters ===
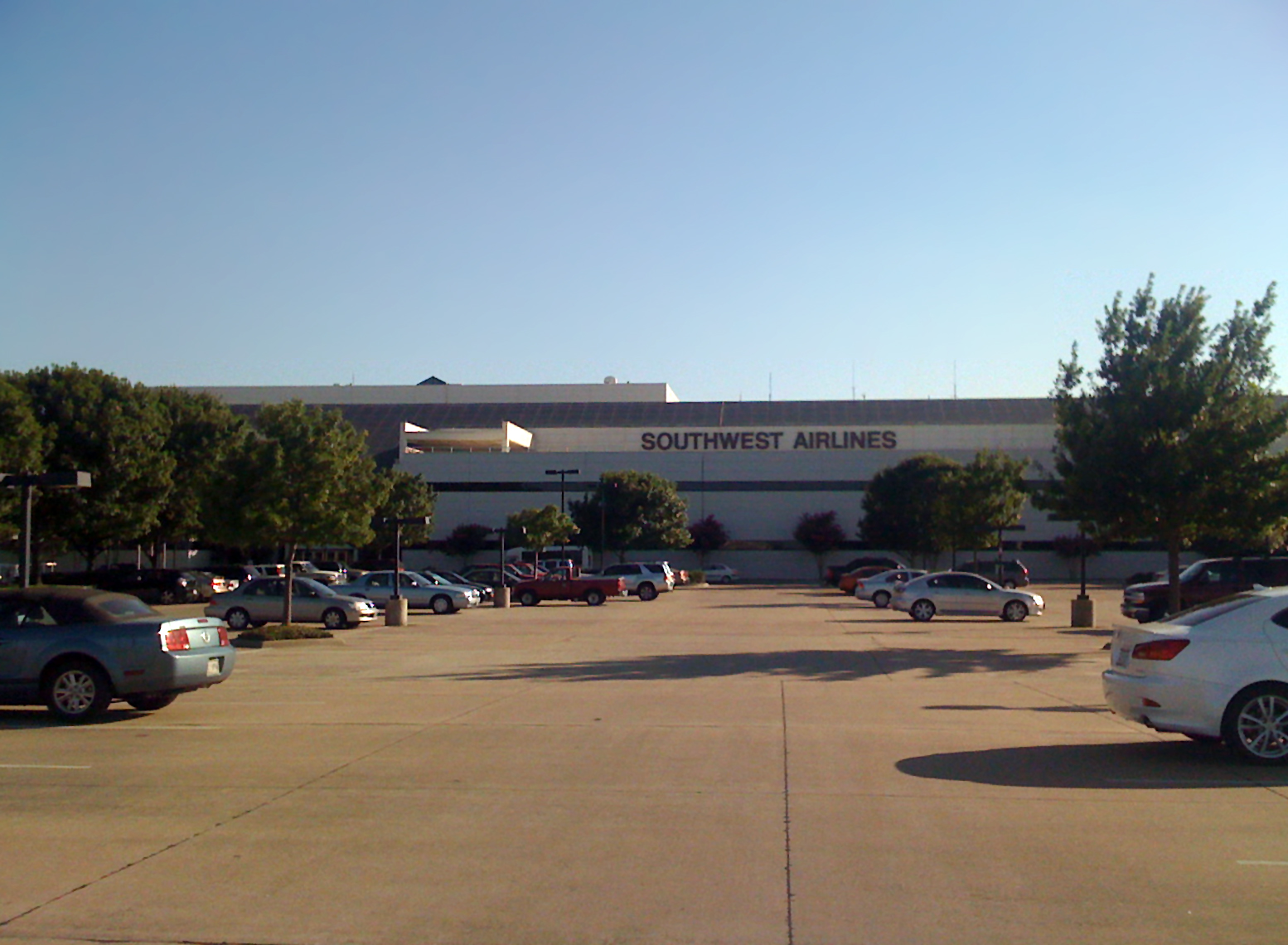
Southwest Airlines' headquarters at Dallas Love Field in Dallas

The Southwest Airlines headquarters are located on the grounds of Dallas Love Field in Dallas.

On September 17, 2012, Southwest broke ground on a new Training and Operational Support building, across the street from its current headquarters building.

On June 2, 2016, Southwest broke ground on its new office and training facility known as Wings. The newest addition to the corporate campus is composed of a 420,000-square-foot, six-story office building, and a 380,000-square-foot adjoining structure called the Leadership Education and Aircrew Development (LEAD) Center that serves as the new pilot training facility. The LEAD Center has the capacity to house and support 18 flight simulators. It is designed to be expanded to accommodate up to 26 simulator bays. The building opened on April 3, 2018.

On August 16, 2019, Southwest announced an expansion of the LEAD Center to accommodate eight additional simulators for future operational and training demands. On January 2, 2020, it was announced that Southwest would be purchasing an additional 3 acres (1.2 ha) of land adjacent to its Wings and LEAD facilities. No additional details were disclosed.

=== Employment ===
As of January 30, 2025, Southwest Airlines had 72,450 active full-time equivalent employees. According to The Washington Post, it uses the hiring motto of seeking people that have a "Servant's Heart, Warrior Spirit, Fun-LUVing Attitude". It also uses the internal practice of ranking "employees first, customers second". Southwest Airlines pilots are represented by the Southwest Airlines Pilot Association union.

Bob Jordan became Southwest's sixth CEO on February 1, 2022, replacing Gary C. Kelly. Kelly continues as chairman of Southwest Airlines. Kelly replaced Jim Parker on July 15, 2004, and assumed the title of president on July 15, 2008, replacing former president Colleen Barrett.

In September 2024, in response to pressure from Elliott Investment Management, Kelly announced that he would not seek reelection as executive chairman in 2025. Jordan is expected to remain as CEO. On October 24, 2024, Kelly announced he would accelerate his retirement, which – along with the previously announced retirements of six other Southwest directors – would go into effect on November 1, 2024. Rakesh Gangwal was announced as independent chair of the board of directors three days later. Gangwal stepped down as chair on August 1, 2025, and Doug Brooks was announced as the new independent chair of the board.

About 83% of Southwest employees are members of a union. The Southwest Airline Pilots' Association, a union not affiliated with the Air Line Pilots Association, represents the airline's pilots. The aircraft maintenance technicians are represented by the Aircraft Mechanics Fraternal Association. Customer service agents and reservation agents are represented by the International Association of Machinists and Aerospace Workers Union. Flight dispatchers, flight attendants, ramp agents, and operations agents are represented by the Transport Workers Union.

The company has appeared on various "best places to work" list, with its employee culture mentioned by Travel and Leisure, CNBC, and Forbes. The company has also been named to Fortune magazine's "Most Admired Companies" list, reaching number 14 in 2021.

Before the COVID-19 pandemic, Southwest never furloughed an employee. As a result of the pandemic, the company launched voluntary separation and extended time-off programs in 2020, and around 16,900 employees volunteered to take an early retirement or long-term leave. Roughly 24% were pilots and 33% were flight attendants. In late 2020, the airline issued some WARN Act notices and announced incipient pay cuts for many employees in response to pandemic impacts, but these measures were rescinded after the Consolidated Appropriations Act, 2021 was enacted on December 27, 2020, providing additional financial aid to US airlines.

The latest five-year labor contract for Southwest Airlines pilots was approved in January 2024.

Following the Elliot board takeover in February 2025, Southwest laid off 1,750 of its non-contract staff, approximately 15% of its corporate workforce.

=== Impact on carriers ===
Southwest and its business model have had an influence on other low-cost carriers (LCCs). The competitive strategy combines a high level of employee and aircraft productivity with low unit costs by reducing aircraft turnaround time, particularly at the gate. Europe's EasyJet and Ryanair are two of the best-known airlines to follow Southwest's business strategy in that continent. Other airlines with a business model based on Southwest's system include Canada's WestJet, Malaysia's AirAsia (the first and biggest LCC in Asia), India's IndiGo, Australia's Jetstar, a subsidiary of Qantas (although Jetstar now operates three aircraft types), Philippines' Cebu Pacific, Thailand's Nok Air, Mexico's Volaris, Indonesia's Lion Air and Turkey's Pegasus Airlines.

=== Lobbying against high-speed rail ===
In the early 1990s, Southwest Airlines actively opposed proposals to develop high-speed rail in Texas, viewing the project as a competitor to its short-haul flights. The proposed rail system would have connected Dallas, San Antonio, and Houston. Southwest lobbied both the United States Congress and the Texas Legislature, and filed multiple lawsuits aimed at halting the initiative. In a 1991 statement to Texas officials, the airline argued that high-speed rail would only be feasible if it displaced existing airline services and received substantial public subsidies. The project was cancelled in 1994 with many observers citing Southwest’s lobbying efforts as a significant factor in its failure.

=== Advertising ===
The company has always employed humor in its advertising. Former slogans include "Love Is Still Our Field", "Just Plane Smart", "The Somebody Else Up There Who Loves You", "You're Now Free to Move About the Country", "THE Low Fare Airline", "Grab your bag, It's On!", and "Welcome Aboard". The airline's slogan (as of 2022) is "Low fares. Nothing to hide. That's TransFarency!"

In March 1992, shortly after Southwest started using the "Just Plane Smart" motto, Stevens Aviation, which had been using "Plane Smart" for its motto, advised Southwest that it was infringing on its trademark. Instead of a lawsuit, the CEOs for both companies staged an arm-wrestling match, dubbed as "Malice in Dallas". It was held at the Dallas Sportatorium and set for two out of three rounds, the loser of each round was to pay $5,000 to the charity of his choice, with the winner gaining the use of the trademarked phrase. A promotional video was created showing the CEOs "training" for the bout (with CEO Herb Kelleher being helped up during a sit-up where a cigarette and glass of Wild Turkey 101 whiskey was waiting) and distributed among the employees and also as a video press release along with the video of the match itself. Herb Kelleher lost the match for Southwest, with Stevens Aviation winning the rights to the phrase. Kurt Herwald, CEO of Stevens Aviation, immediately granted the use of "Just Plane Smart" to Southwest Airlines. The net result was both companies having use of the trademark.

== Accidents and incidents ==
Southwest Airlines has been involved in the following accidents:

- March 5, 2000 – Flight 1455: A Boeing 737-300 (registration N668SW) overran the runway upon landing at Burbank Airport in California, injuring 44 people. The captain was later dismissed, and the aircraft was damaged beyond repair. Two people were seriously injured, and 42 had minor injuries.
- August 11, 2000 – Flight 1763: A Boeing 737-700 (registration N798SW) en route from Las Vegas, Nevada, to Salt Lake City, Utah, experienced an air rage incident in which a passenger attempted to storm the cockpit. He was restrained by other passengers but died of asphyxiation during the struggle. One other passenger sustained a minor injury.
- December 8, 2005 – Flight 1248: A Boeing 737-700 (registration N471WN) overran the runway during landing at Chicago Midway International Airport in Illinois during heavy snow, striking several cars on a nearby street and killing a six-year-old boy. Several passengers and people on the ground were injured. One person on the ground was killed, nine others were seriously injured, and three people on board sustained minor injuries.
- July 13, 2009 – Flight 2294: A Boeing 737-300 (registration N387SW) operating from Nashville International Airport to Baltimore/Washington International Airport diverted to Yeager Airport in Charleston, West Virginia, after a hole formed in the fuselage near the tail, causing cabin depressurization. The aircraft landed safely and was later repaired. No injuries were reported. Following the incident, Boeing issued a service bulletin recommending additional inspections to detect potential cracking in this area of the fuselage skin. The U.S. Federal Aviation Administration (FAA) subsequently issued an airworthiness directive mandating these inspections for all Boeing 737 Classic aircraft.
- April 1, 2011 – Flight 812: A Boeing 737-300 (registration N632SW) diverted to Yuma International Airport after a hole appeared in the fuselage while en route from Phoenix Sky Harbor International Airport to Sacramento International Airport. The aircraft landed safely. Two passengers sustained minor injuries. The incident was similar to Flight 2294 and prompted the FAA to issue a second airworthiness directive requiring more frequent inspections.
- July 22, 2013 – Flight 345: A Boeing 737-700 (registration N753SW) suffered a hard landing at New York's LaGuardia Airport after a flight from Nashville International Airport. The nose gear collapsed and penetrated the electronics bay, causing the aircraft to slide off the runway. The captain was dismissed, and the aircraft was scrapped. Ten passengers sustained minor injuries.
- August 4, 2016 – Flight 149: A Boeing 737-300 (registration N368SW) suffered a nose gear collapse during pushback at Baltimore/Washington International Airport after a tug operator exceeded safe towing speed. The aircraft sustained severe damage and was written off. No one was injured.
- August 27, 2016 – Flight 3472: A Boeing 737-700 (registration N766SW) suffered an uncontained engine failure while en route from New Orleans to Orlando, damaging the engine nacelle and fuselage. The aircraft diverted safely to Pensacola International Airport. No one was injured.
- April 17, 2018 – Flight 1380: A Boeing 737-700 (registration N772SW) suffered an uncontained engine failure while en route from New York–LaGuardia to Dallas, causing debris to shatter a window. Cabin depressurization partially ejected a passenger, who later died from her injuries. Eight other passengers sustained minor injuries.

== Controversies and passenger incidents ==
In October 2019, a Southwest flight attendant filed a lawsuit against the airline, claiming that two pilots had livestreamed footage from a camera hidden in the plane's toilet to an iPad, and that one of the pilots said that such cameras were a "top-secret security measure" installed in all of the airline's 737-800 aircraft. Southwest and the pilot union stated that the film was a hoax and a "poor attempt at humor" by one of the pilots, who had previously recorded himself on a different aircraft, fully clothed.

In February 2020, a report conducted by the DOT inspector general found that Southwest was flying airplanes with safety concerns and that the Federal Aviation Administration was failing to properly oversee the airline.

Citing four whistleblowers, federal investigators with the US Office of Special Counsel released a report on July 27, 2022, that follows up on the 2020 DOT inspector general's report. The 2022 report claims that Southwest stonewalled Federal Aviation Administration (FAA) investigations into maintenance and piloting safety lapses, and criticized the FAA for failing to adequately oversee the airline, stating that senior FAA staff "mismanaged and interfered" with investigations "in the face of SWA's intimidation tactics". The report accuses Southwest of misusing the FAA's Aviation Safety Action Program (ASAP) to hide pilot errors, while accusing the FAA of failing to adequately oversee Southwest's mechanics, and of failing to adequately vet maintenance records provided by the airline for forty-nine 737 aircraft purchased from foreign carriers whose documentation practices did not meet FAA standards.

=== Christmas 2022 meltdown ===
The airline experienced severe delays and thousands of flight cancellations starting on December 21, 2022, and continuing through Christmas. Many cancellations were due to bad weather from the severe late December winter storm across much of the United States, but industry experts and SWAPA also blamed inadequate staffing and the airline's "outdated" employee scheduling system, citing reports of pilots awaiting work assignments for up to eight hours. On December 26, the airline initiated a massive system "reset", preemptively canceling thousands of flights and halting ticket sales over concerns that travelers might buy tickets for flights that were subsequently canceled.

In December 2023, the airline reached a settlement with the United States Department of Transportation for a record-breaking $140 million fine, exceeding the previous record by a factor of roughly 30. The financial impact from the crisis exceeded $1.1 billion in losses. The settlement included a $35 million fine payable directly to the federal government. However, USDOT waived the final $11 million payment of the fine.

== See also ==
- Air transportation in the United States
- Effect of low-cost airlines on communities
- Transportation in the United States
- Nuts!

== Bibliography ==
- Solberg, C. (1979). Conquest of the skies. Boston: Little, Brown & Co.
- Davies, R.E.G. (1982). Airlines of the United States since 1914. Washington (D.C.): Smithsonian Institution Press.
- Shives, B.; Thompson, B. (1984). Airlines of North America. Sarasota (Fla): Crestline Publishing Co. Inc.
- Creedy, K.B. (1992). Time flies... San Antonio (TX): Loflin & Ass.
- Lusk, B. Southwest Airlines-35 years of luvin’ you 1971-2006. Sandpoint (Indiana): Airways Int.
