= Bob Jordan (businessman) =

American business executive

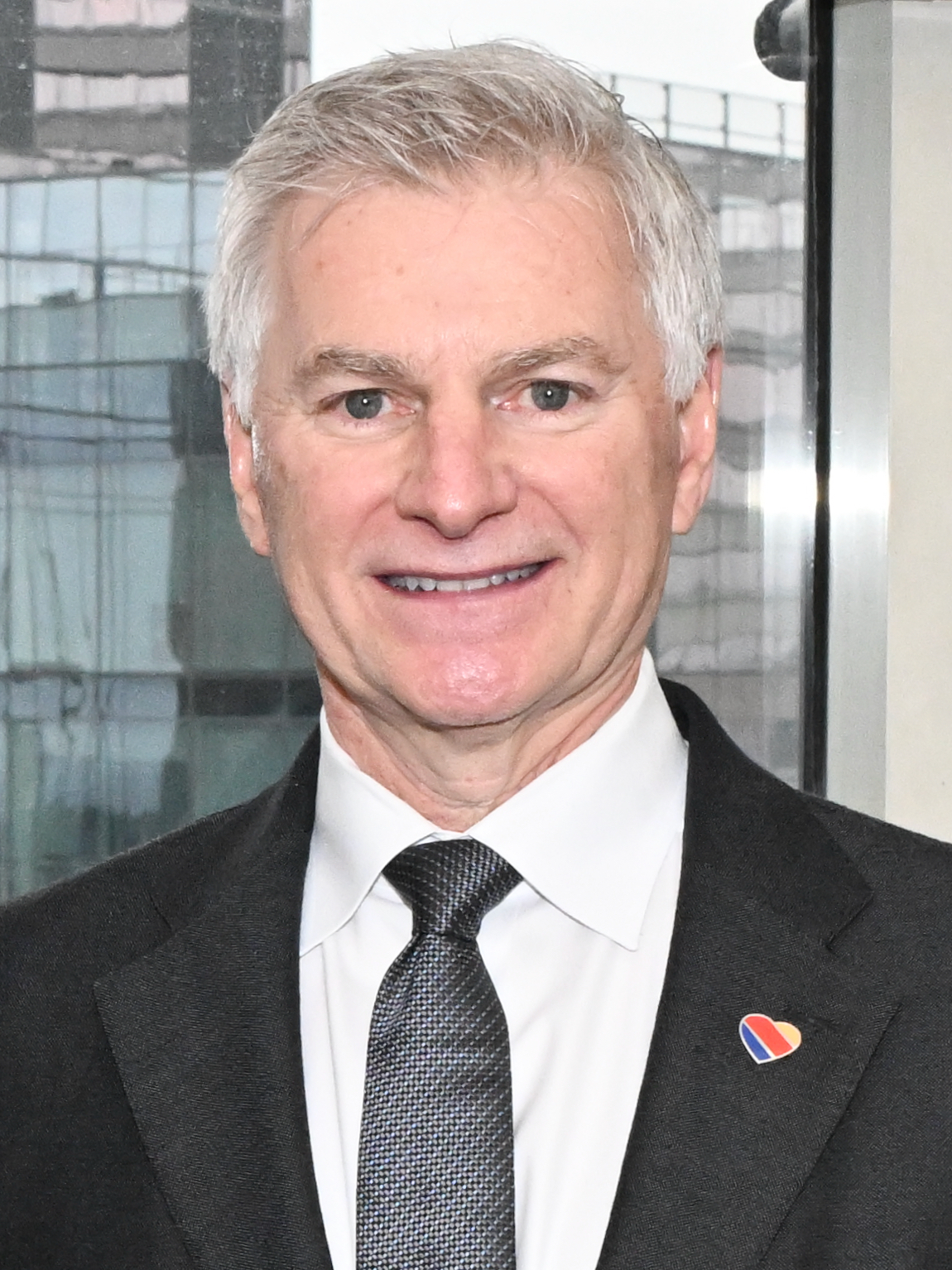
- Jordan in 2024
- Born: Robert Jordan
- Education: Texas A&M University (BS, MBA)
- Occupation: Business executive

Robert Jordan is an American business executive who took on the role of chief executive officer (CEO) at Southwest Airlines on February 1, 2022.

In June 2021, it was announced that Jordan would succeed Gary C. Kelly as the sixth CEO of the company in February 2022. Previously he was executive vice president of corporate services for Southwest Airlines.

== Education ==
Jordan graduated from Texas A&M University with a computer science degree. He has both a bachelor’s degree and an MBA from the university.

== Career ==
Before joining Southwest Airlines in 1988, he worked as a programmer and financial analyst for Hewlett-Packard. During his time at Southwest, he has served in a wide variety of roles, notably previously running AirTran Airways following Southwest's acquisition of the carrier in 2011.

In December of 2022, Jordan presided over the 2022 Southwest Airlines Scheduling Crisis, during which a significant number of flights were cancelled in the week following Christmas due to an operational systems failure.

Under Jordan's leadership, Southwest ended its 54 year open-seating model and "Bags Fly Free" perk. While Jordan initially promised to protect its signature "Bags Fly Free" perk, he later reversed course, announcing it would eliminate free checked bags for standard ticketholders, instituting $35 fee for the first bag and $45 for the second bag.

These changes drew mixed reactions. Whilst the public reacted with intense immediate pushback, characterized by widespread anger, accusations of a corporate "money grab," and threats of a mass boycott from loyal fliers, others saw it as a concession to satisfy other stakeholders—notably Elliot investment group. While Southwest suffered a 42% decline in profits in the aftermath of these changes, it returned to profitability in Q1 2026, posting a net income of $227 million compared to a $149 million loss the prior year.

Jordan's compensation as CEO was $10.5 million as of 2025.
