= Gary C. Kelly =

American business executive (born 1955)

Gary Kelly
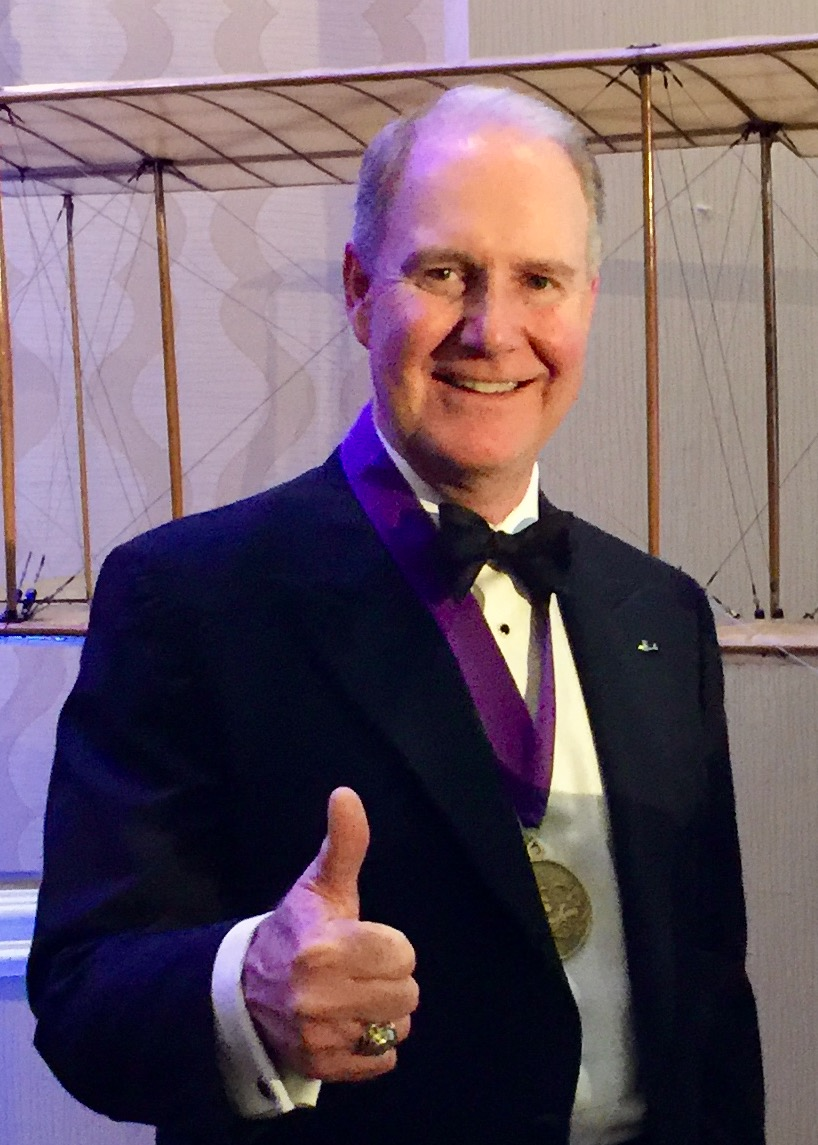
- Born: Gary Clayton Kelly; March 12, 1955 (age 71); San Antonio, Texas, U.S.
- Education: University of Texas, Austin (BBA)
- Occupation: Business executive
- Title: Chairman emeritus, Southwest Airlines
- Term: 2024–present

Gary Clayton Kelly (born March 12, 1955) is an American business executive. He is the former chairman and former chief executive officer of Southwest Airlines.

== Education ==
Kelly studied accounting at the University of Texas at Austin.

== Career ==
Prior to his work at Southwest, Kelly worked as an audit manager for Arthur Young & Co. and a controller for Sterling Software.

Kelly first joined Southwest Airlines in 1986 as a controller. In 1989, Kelly was promoted to chief financial officer and vice president of finance. In 2001, he was promoted to Executive Vice President. Kelly spent 3 years in this role until he was promoted to become Southwest's fifth CEO and vice chairman in 2004 replacing James Parker who succeeded Herb Kelleher in 2001.

Kelly was named chairman of the board of directors of Southwest Airlines on May 21, 2008, replacing co-founder Herb Kelleher. Gary Kelly also became president of Southwest Airlines the same year, replacing Colleen Barrett when her contract expired on July 15, 2008.

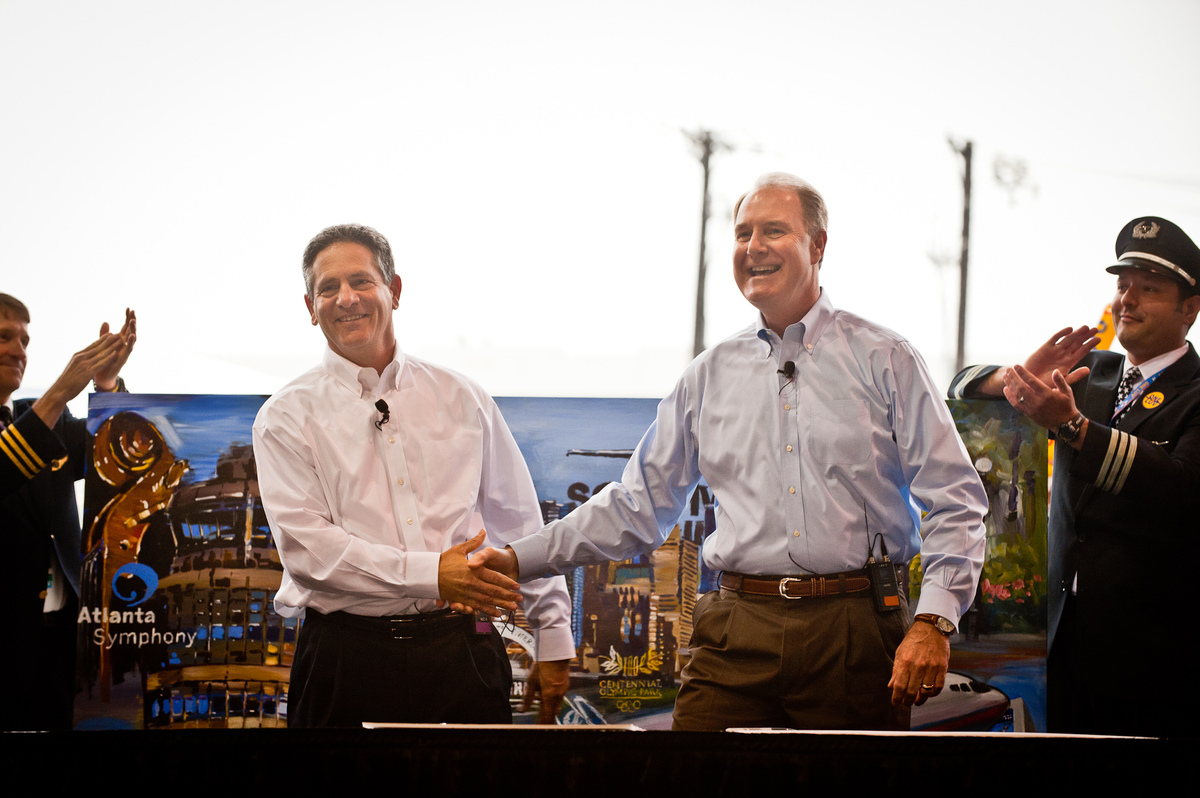
Gary Kelly and Bob Fornaro during AirTran acquisition

As CEO, Kelly has guided the airline to become the largest carrier of domestic passengers in the United States. He has led the company through a number of transformative, large-scale initiatives including the revamp of the airline's Rapid Rewards program, the introduction of the Boeing 737–800 and 737 MAX aircraft to Southwest's fleet, the acquisition of AirTran Airways, the launching of Southwest's first international service, an update to the airline's branding, the adoption of the Amadeus reservation system, and large expansion projects at the company's corporate headquarters in Dallas.

On January 10, 2017, Kelly announced changes to the company's executive leadership ranks with Thomas M. Nealon named as president and Michael G. Van de Ven named as the airline's chief operating officer. These changes were effective immediately. Kelly retained the title of chairman and chief executive officer.

After agreeing to take a salary cut to prevent employee furloughs, his base salary reduced to zero until the end of 2021.

On 23 June 2021, Kelly announced he would relinquish his role as CEO in February 2022, with Bob Jordan announced to take his place at that time. Kelly said he would remain as executive chairman of the board until at least 2026.

On December 15, 2021, Kelly testified against mask mandates on airplanes at a Senate Committee on Commerce, Science, and Transportation hearing while sitting unmasked next to other unmasked senior airline executives opposed to mask mandates; two days later he tested positive for COVID-19.

In late December 2022, the airline experienced a catastrophic holiday meltdown with severe delays and thousands of flight cancellations through the Christmas holiday. The US Department of Transportation (USDOT) launched an investigation, and in December 2023, the airline reached a settlement and received a record-setting $140 million fine from the USDOT and reported losses exceeding $1.1 billion stemming from the crisis. A major cause of the crisis was the inability of Southwest's crew scheduling system to cope with disruptions from a major winter storm affecting Chicago and Denver. In the midst of protracted contract negotiations under federal mediation, the Southwest Airline Pilots Association, the union representing Southwest pilots, had warned publicly for months that the unreliability of the crew scheduling system would cause mass cancellations and that management was neglecting the problem. The union blamed the crisis on Kelly's leadership, saying that he had fostered a corporate culture in which senior executives made decisions in isolation, and contrasting this with what it described as Southwest's history of "ground-up decision-making". Union president Tom Nekouei said, "This is not a Southwest Airlines problem. This is not an employees of Southwest Airlines problem. This is not an unprecedented weather problem. This is a Gary Kelly problem."

In June 2024, Elliott Investment Management, an activist investment fund, announced that it had taken a $1.9 billion position in Southwest and would seek to oust leadership at the carrier, arguing it had "failed to evolve" citing "leadership’s stubborn unwillingness to evolve the Company’s strategy." The purchase amounted to over 10% of common stock in Southwest, entitling Elliott to call a special meeting of shareholders if Southwest would not agree to its demands. Elliott demanded that Kelly and Jordan step down, blaming the pair for the sharp decrease in the value of Southwest stock over the preceding years.

On September 10, the day after the Southwest board of directors met with Elliott, Kelly said in a letter to shareholders that he would not seek reelection as executive chairman at the spring 2025 annual shareholder meeting. However, the airline announced in late October that Kelly would retire early on November 1, 2024, instead, and would assume the title of chairman emeritus. (Note: Chairman emeritus is typically a ceremonial title that allows the honoree to attend board meetings and act in an advisory capacity, but not to vote on official board matters.) Southwest promoted aviation industry veteran Rakesh Gangwal, had been appointed to the board in July 2024, to chair of the board.

== Awards and recognition ==
Kelly was named one of the best CEOs in America for 2008, 2009 and 2010 by Institutional Investor magazine and serves on the President's Council of Jobs and Competitiveness.

In 2014, Kelly received the Advertising Innovation and Marketing Excellence (AIME) Award.

Kelly was the 2016 recipient of the Tony Jannus Award for distinguished achievement in commercial air transportation.

In 2017, Fortune named Kelly the #3 most underrated CEO in America (after Satya Nadella and Jeff Bezos) based on a survey of Fortune 500 CEOs asking them which of their fellow CEOs do not get enough credit. Kelly received 85 votes.

On February 18, 2020, Gary Kelly was named as the recipient of the 2020 Philanthropic Leadership Award from The Ireland Funds.

On October 25, 2021, Gary Kelly was the recipient of the 2021 Lifetime Achievement Award from 3BL Media.

== Personal life ==
Kelly was born in San Antonio on March 12, 1955. Kelly received a Bachelor of Business Administration in Accounting from the University of Texas at Austin. He is a Certified Public Accountant.

Kelly first met his wife Carol in eighth grade. They married in 1976. Together, they have two daughters.
