= 2022 Southwest Airlines scheduling crisis =

Flight scheduling crisis in late December 2022

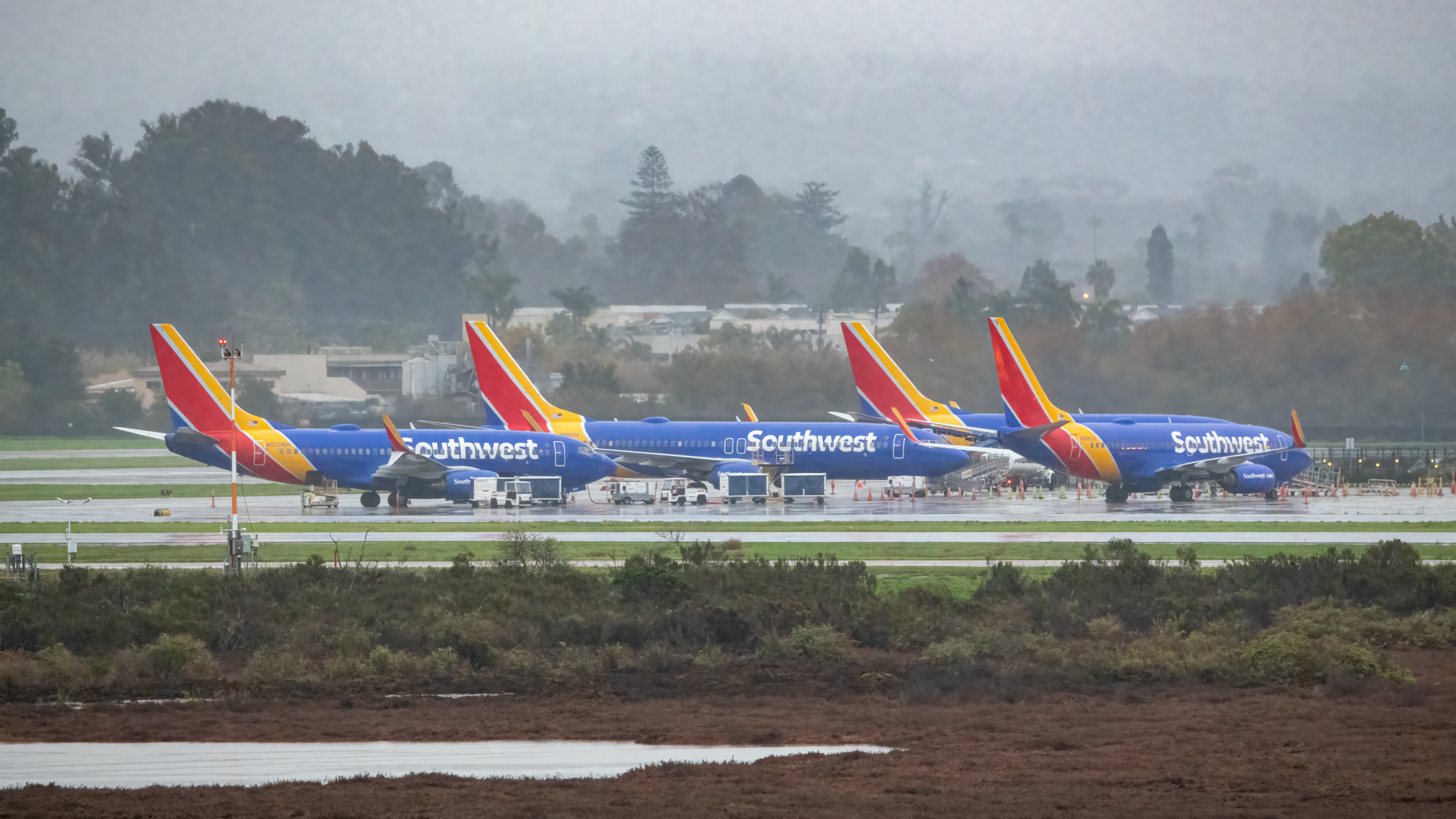
- Southwest Airlines aircraft parked at Santa Barbara Airport during the mass cancellation event
- Date: December 21–30, 2022
- Location: United States
- Also known as: Southwest Airlines holiday meltdown Southwest Airlines holiday travel meltdown 2022 Southwest Airlines flight cancellations
- Type: Flight cancellations
- Cause: Computer system failure and the December 2022 North American winter storm
- Outcome: Formal investigations, flight cancellations and reimbursements, government settlement

The 2022 Southwest Airlines scheduling crisis refers to an incident in December 2022 when Southwest Airlines, a major U.S. airline, and the third largest by domestic passenger volume, canceled more flights than usual, including more than 60% of its flights on two days. The crisis spanned December 21–30, at the peak of the holiday travel season, and is referred to in the news media as the Southwest Airlines holiday travel meltdown, or simply holiday meltdown, a name also used by the Southwest Airlines pilot's union, and U.S. Department of Transportation. The disruption to operations was described as the most costly and largest in the history of U.S. airlines. More than 15,000 flights were canceled throughout the crisis.

On December 18, 2023, Southwest was fined $140 million by the U.S. Department of Transportation, surpassing the highest previous fine in the agency's history by a factor of about 30. As of that date, Southwest had paid about $600 million in reimbursement to passengers, and reported losses of $1.1 billion to over $1.2 billion as a result of the events.

== Background ==
Southwest's flight cancellation rate tripled from 0.8% in 2012 to 2.4% by 2022. The airline had also had higher cancellation rates than other major airlines. Meanwhile, their flight on time rate had slid to its lowest level in 10 years. Michael Santoro, the vice president of the Southwest Airlines Pilots Association (SWAPA) said that Southwest had not invested in an updated software system. There had been complaints for a decade from members of the flight attendant's union that the technology behind Southwest's scheduling system was outdated.

In the early summer of 2022, SWAPA picketed Southwest not for increased pay or benefits—the traditional goals of an airline worker's union—but rather for the improvement of the airline's crew scheduling system. SWAPA said the system was inflexible, often canceling delayed flights when the crews did not have enough remaining allowable duty hours, rather than locating and dispatching backup crews. Crews of canceled flights often found themselves stranded without lodging and the airline would lose track of them, said the union, predicting that these problems would lead to future mass cancellations.

In June and October 2021 Southwest suffered mass cancellation events. Southwest canceled more than 2,000 flights during the October 2021 event, blaming a combination of weather, insufficient staff, and air traffic control. The disruption to Southwest's system was worse than with other airlines at the time. SWAPA blamed the failure on poor planning by management.

== Summary and timeline ==
On Wednesday, December 21, 2022, a major winter storm caused severe winter weather across much of the western United States, prompting many airlines to cancel many flights. In a December 21 memo to airport ramp staff at Denver International Airport (DEN), Southwest's vice president for ground operations declared a "state of operational emergency" because of an "unusually high number of absences" there, implementing mandatory overtime and disallowing telemedicine appointments to excuse absences due to sickness. The state of operational emergency was only implemented at DEN, which was subjected to unusually frigid conditions. An airline spokesperson later denied that the Denver absences were the result of a "coordinated 'job action'" by ramp employees there.

From Wednesday, December 21, until Sunday, December 25, 2022, Southwest canceled around 25% of its flights. On December 26, Southwest canceled over 50% of its trips, blaming the winter storm. Some customers could not contact the airline nor locate their luggage. On Monday, December 26, Southwest initiated a massive systemwide "reset", preemptively canceling thousands of scheduled flights that week, and halting ticket sales over concerns that travelers might buy tickets for flights that would be subsequently canceled; the airline said it would not allow flights to be rebooked until December 31 or later. Parents reported that, on December 26, the airline stopped allowing unaccompanied minors to travel.

By December 27, it became more clear that weather was not the sole cause of the mass cancellations; rather, the airline's operational systems were struggling to recover from the disruptions. On December 25 and 26, Southwest canceled over 5,500 flights, whereas its competitor Delta Air Lines canceled 311. It was reported that Southwest cockpit and cabin crews had been suffering extremely long delays contacting crew scheduling, with telephone hold times exceeding five hours. It was later reported that some pilots and flight attendants had gone to sleep with their phones on hold and had woken up the next morning to find that they were still on hold. On December 26, weather at DEN warmed substantially and other airlines largely resumed normal operations, yet Southwest canceled 415 flights, about 75% of its schedule there, accounting for about 90% of the total cancellations at the airport that day. That same day, Southwest canceled over 200 flights at Dallas Love Field, while Dallas Fort Worth International Airport—which is located a short distance away, handles many more flights, and is not used by Southwest—saw 31 cancellations.

On December 28, Southwest canceled 2,348 more flights.

On December 30, Southwest began flying most of its regular schedule. Chief executive officer (CEO) Robert Jordan issued an apology via video recording seven days after mass cancellations began.

Throughout the crisis, a substantial number of passengers were left stranded at airports across the Southwest route network seeking alternative flights or modes of transportation, with multi-hour wait times for rental car counters a common occurrence. Passengers seeking to purchase tickets on competing carriers encountered substantial price hikes due to increased demand, before some carriers announced temporary price caps on certain routes. Many Southwest crews found themselves competing with stranded passengers for scarce hotel rooms and ground transportation, with no help from the company.

On Monday January 2, 2023, three days after Southwest had declared a return to normal operations, 160 flights (3% of its flights) had been canceled, the most of any American airline, according to tracking site FlightAware. Another 422, or 10%, of its scheduled flights were delayed. The majority of disrupted flights were scheduled to fly in or out of Denver.

=== Cancellations and delays by day ===
Cancellations and delays by day:
Date	Number of flights canceled	Percentage of schedule canceled	Number of flights delayed	Percentage of flights delayed
December 21, 2022	178		1,435	
December 22, 2022	1,026		1,750	
December 23, 2022	1,445		1,926	
December 24, 2022	1,420		1,512	
December 25, 2022	1,854	43%	1,422	48%
December 26, 2022	3,037	71%	733	16%
December 27, 2022	2,731	64%	974	22%
December 28, 2022	2,525	61%	391	
December 29, 2022	2,397	58%	214	7%
December 30, 2022	34	1%	939	23%

== Causes ==
=== Computer technology ===
Initial investigations said outdated technology was to blame and an industry analyst said it was also due to airlines "running these razor thin margins". The number of full-time tech workers at Southwest declined by 27% from 2018 to 2021 while overall full-time employment at the airline declined by just 6% over the same period. Antiquated computer infrastructure and software systems used for managing and crewing flights contributed heavily to the quantity of flight cancellations; Southwest Airlines was unable at points to locate crew members to adequately staff flights. In November 2022, SWAPA predicted the company was "one IT router failure away from a complete meltdown." At a media event that same month, CEO Robert Jordan mentioned that "the company's growth outstripped the tools needed", referencing the airline's switch to electronic baggage and weather reporting, a technology adopted by other airlines years prior; Southwest had been delivering the reports on paper to all of its daily flights. A representative of the Transport Workers Union of America (TWU) Local 556, the union representing Southwest's flight attendants, said that the airline's hesitance to adopt new technology had "almost became a running joke around the company".

Rather than using standard commercial scheduling software like that used by other airlines, Southwest relied at the time on two proprietary and internally-maintained software programs, SkySolver and Crew Web Access. Although both programs were available as mobile apps, they frequently failed during even mild weather disruptions, forcing crews to telephone crew scheduling specialists. During the crisis, telephone operators at scheduling were overwhelmed, and crews found themselves waiting on hold for hours and being assigned to flights that had already been canceled, in turn preventing them operating other flights before their duty hours expired. The airline resorted to training 1,000 additional employees to help crews on the telephone.

=== Route network ===
Unlike other large U.S. airlines which mostly used hub-and-spoke systems, Southwest used point-to-point operations in 2022, making it unusually vulnerable to scheduling disruptions because its available pilots and flight attendants were not concentrated at its hubs and it could not easily reroute passengers by sending them to the hubs. Experts attributed the crisis largely to the lack of scheduling flexibility inherent in the point-to-point operations model.

== Aftermath ==
In a letter from Transportation Secretary Pete Buttigieg to CEO Jordan dated December 29, 2022, the Department of Transportation identified that the cancellations were not caused by weather. This places the onus of financial responsibility for the cancellations on Southwest. On January 6, 2023, Southwest issued about US$300 worth of frequent flyer points to affected customers to be claimed by March 31, 2023. By January 6, 2023, Southwest stock had lost 8% of its value from immediately before the crisis.

In an unofficial report released by Southwest, the losses for the 4th quarter of 2022 are expected to be $725 million to $825 million.

Southwest announced their intention to spend $1.3 billion on maintenance and technology upgrades to correct the problems that caused the crisis.

=== Investigation ===
On December 27, 2022, the United States Senate Commerce Committee promised to investigate.

On December 28, 2022, the U.S. Department of Transportation launched a formal investigation. Meanwhile, Buttigieg criticized Southwest in various interviews.

=== Settlement ===
In December 2023, Southwest reached a settlement and received a $140 million fine from the U.S. Department of Transportation. The fine is thirty times larger than any other consumer protection penalty, making it the largest in history. As part of the settlement, Southwest agreed to establish a $90 million compensation fund for future delays.

== In popular culture ==
Saturday Night Live parodied the crisis in a sketch aired on January 28, 2023. The sketch, titled "Southwest Airlines Announcement," featured Heidi Gardner and Devon Walker as Southwest spokespeople announcing the airline's response to the crisis: upgrading its entire communications system to use Dell computers from 2008, sorting luggage by color instead of by destination, and only hiring flight attendants with prior experience as Waffle House servers.

== See also ==
- Contract of carriage
- History of Southwest Airlines
