= List of breweries in Georgia (U.S. state) =

Breweries in Georgia produce a wide range of beers in different styles that are marketed locally, regionally and nationally.

In 2012 Georgia's 29 breweries and brewpubs employed 1,650 people directly, and more than 31,000 others in related jobs such as wholesaling and retailing. Including people directly employed in brewing, as well as those who supply Georgia's breweries with everything from ingredients to machinery, the total business and personal tax revenue generated by Georgia's breweries and related industries was more than $1.4 billion. Consumer purchases of Georgia's brewery products generated another $366 million in tax revenue. In 2012, according to the Brewers Association, Georgia ranked 48th in the number of craft breweries per capita, with 24.

For context, at the end of 2013 there were 2,822 breweries in the United States, including 2,768 craft breweries subdivided into 1,237 brewpubs, 1,412 microbreweries and 119 regional craft breweries. In that same year, according to the Beer Institute, the brewing industry employed around 43,000 Americans in brewing and distribution and had a combined economic impact of more than $246 billion.

== Georgia breweries ==
=== Historic ===
1738 - first brewery in Georgia; Major William Horton, aide to James Oglethorpe, administers Jekyll Island; his residence, Horton House, includes a brewery supplying beer to soldiers and settlers in the area

=== Current ===
Georgia breweries, brewpubs, and client brewers in current operation
Name	Location	Initial Production	Type	Barrels/year production	Distributed By
Awkward Brewing®	Fayetteville	2015 (WA)	Brewery	Unknown	Liberator
Camp Brewing Company	Hampton	2022	Brewery	Unknown	Modern Hops
Cherry Street Brewing Co-op (Rick Tanner's)	Cumming	2012	Brewpub	750	Atlanta Beverage Company/Modern Hops
Coastal Empire Beer Co.	Savannah	2011	Brewery	Unknown	Savannah Distribution
Creature Comforts	Athens	2014	Brewery	50,000+	Savannah Distributing
Debellation Brewing Company	Richmond Hill	2019	Brewery	400	Modern Hops Distribution
Eagle Creek Brewing Company	Statesboro	2013	Brewery	4,500	Atlanta Beverage Company
Line Creek Brewing	Peachtree City	2018	Brewery	Unknown	Unknown
Monday Night Brewing	Atlanta	2011	Brewery	7,500	Atlanta Beverage Company
Pearl & Pine Brewery	Senoia	2023	Brewery	Unknown	No Distribution
Piedmont Brewery & Kitchen	Macon	2016	Brewpub	Unknown	Modern Hops
Pontoon Brewing Co.	Sandy Springs	2014	Brewery		Savannah Distribution
Printer's Ale Manufacturing Company	Carrollton	2017	Brewery		Atlanta Beverage Company
Reformation Brewery	Woodstock	2012	Brewery	5,000	Atlanta Beverage Company
Riverwatch Brewery	Augusta	2016	Brewery	Unknown	Atlanta Beverage Company
Savannah River Brewing Co.	Augusta	2017	Brewery	Unknown	
Schoolhouse Brewing	Marietta	2019	Brewery		
Slow Pour Brewing Company	Lawrenceville	2017	Brewery		Eagle Rock
Southbound Brewing Co	Savannah	2013	Brewery	6,000	United Distributing
Southern Brewing Co	Athens	2015	Brewery	2,500	Leon Farmer/Modern Hops
StillFire Brewing Co	Suwanee	2019	Brewery	2,000	United Distributing
SweetWater Brewing Company	Atlanta	1997	Brewery	192,500	United Distributors
Terrapin Beer Company	Athens	2002	Brewery	57,000	United Distributors
Three Taverns Craft Brewery	Decatur	2013	Brewery	2,500	Savannah Distributing
Twains Billiards and Tap	Decatur	2006	Brewpub	750	Savannah Distributing
Two Tides Brewing Company	Savannah	2018	Brewpub		
Wild Heaven Beer	Avondale Estates	2010	Brewery	7,000	Georgia Crown
Wild Leap Brew Co.	LaGrange	2017	Brewery		Atlanta Beverage Company
Normaltown Brewing Company	Athens	2020	Brewery		Modern Hops
Variant Brewing Company	Roswell	2015	Brewery		

=== Former ===
Georgia breweries, brewpubs, and client brewers in current operation
Name	Location	Initial Production	Last Production	Type	Barrels/year production	Distributed By
Burnt Hickory Brewery	Kennesaw	2011	2023	Brewery	2,000	
Jekyll Brewing	Alpharetta	2011	2025	Brewery	7,500	Atlanta Beverage Company
Moon River Brewing Company	Savannah	1999	2024	Brewpub	Unknown	Savannah Distributing
Red Hare Brewing Company	Marietta	2011	2025	Brewery	8,000	Atlanta Beverage Company

== See also ==
- Beer in the United States
- List of breweries in the United States
- List of microbreweries
