= Kenny Friedkin =

American aviator and businessman (1915–1962)

Kenneth Giles Friedkin
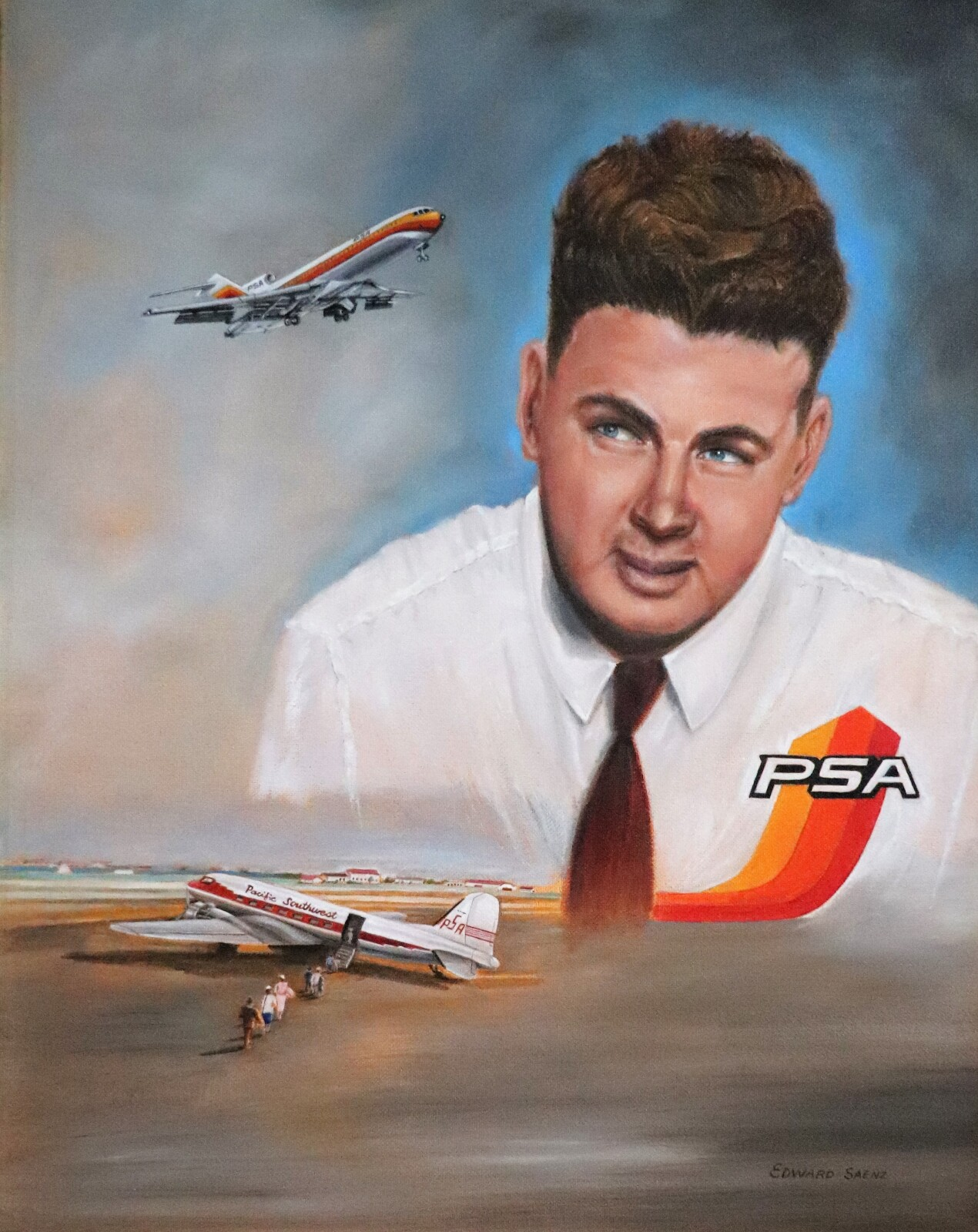
- Born: September 1, 1915; Utica, New York, US
- Died: March 16, 1962 (aged 47); San Diego, California, US
- Occupation: Businessman
- Known for: Founding Pacific Southwest Airlines; Establishing a business dynasty
- Spouse: Jean Friedkin
- Children: Thomas H. Friedkin

Kenneth Giles Friedkin (September 1, 1915 – March 16, 1962) was an American aviator and businessman. He founded Pacific Southwest Airlines (PSA), generally viewed as the original low-cost airline. PSA was the acknowledged inspiration for Southwest Airlines, which in turn inspired low-cost airlines globally. Friedkin is therefore a key figure in the advent of low-cost air travel. In 2001, Forbes referred to Friedkin as "an early-model Herb Kelleher." Friedkin's son and grandson went on to even greater business success outside of aviation.

== Biography ==
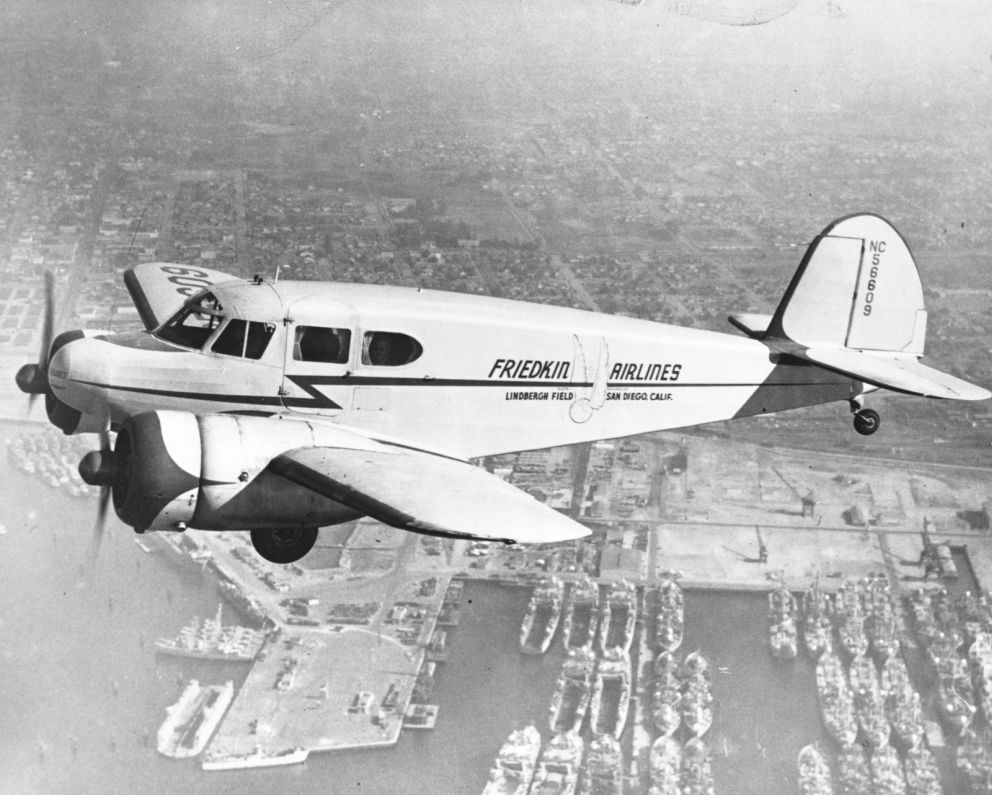
Friedkin Airlines

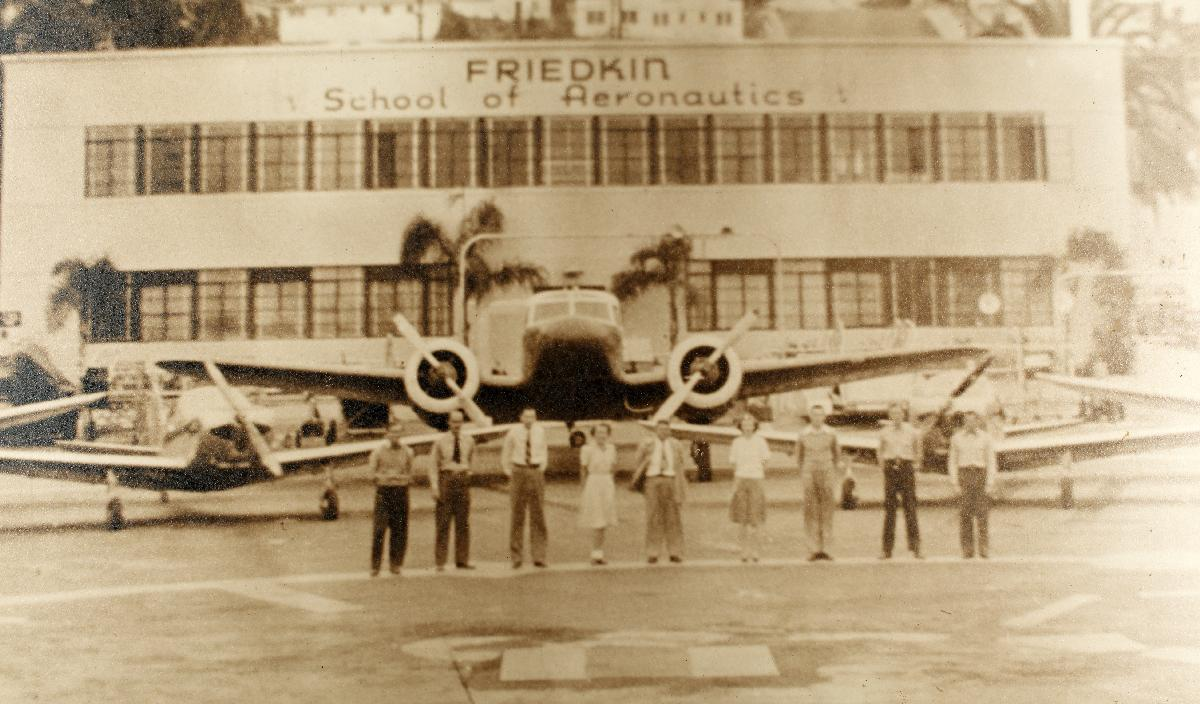
School of Aeronautics, San Diego

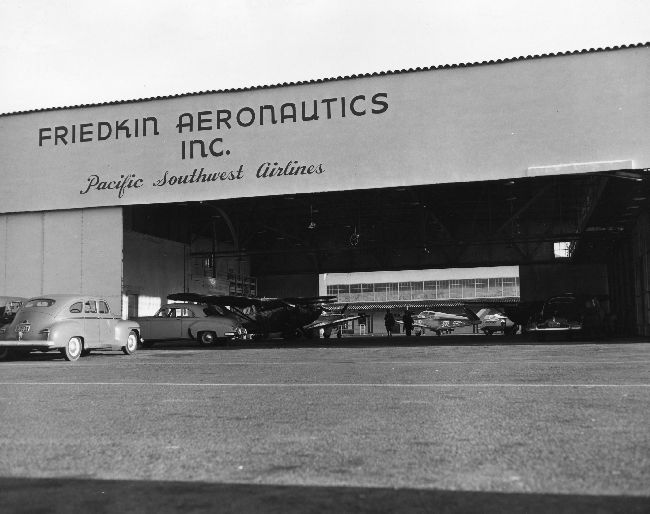
Friedkin Aeronautics Inc., San Diego

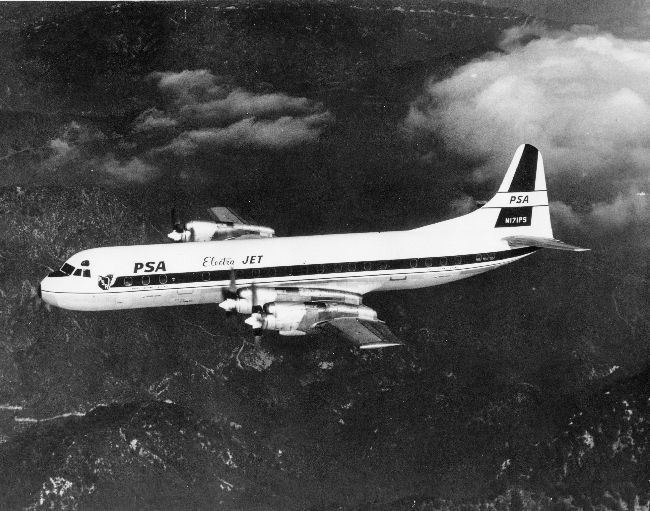
Lockheed Electra of PSA around 1959

Friedkin was the son of a Russian-born Jewish tailor and an American mother. He and his parents moved to Kansas, and later San Diego, California.

Friedkin became interested in aviation after he saw an air show in San Diego at age 8. He obtained his pilot license at the age of 17. In 1945, he opened a flight school called the Plosser-Friedkin School (later named the Friedkin School of Aeronautics). The parent company to the school was Friedkin Aeronautics Inc. The school was not making enough profit. He tried numerous business methods from aerial fish delivery to banner towing with the help of his comrades J. Floyd Andrews and Bill Shimp. Friedkin tried a charter airline called Friedkin Airlines. Friedkin Airlines was a failure.

Using the lessons learned from Friedkin Airlines and receiving advice from a travel agent, he and his wife Jean Friedkin created an airline called Pacific Southwest Airlines in 1949, flying a route from San Diego to Oakland by way of Burbank. In a time when the US airline business was tightly regulated by the federal government, PSA escaped such regulation by operating as an intrastate airline, restricting its flights to California and taking other steps to ensure it minimized participation in interstate commerce. PSA was not the first such airline in California, but it was by far the most successful.

Friedkin died at the age of 47 in 1962 of a cerebral hemorrhage, having seen his then-still tiny airline become a success. His wife, Jean, died the following year. After he died, J. Floyd Andrews became president of PSA, which became utterly dominant within California during the late 1960s and 1970s, with an intra-California market share of 70%. PSA's success in turn inspired Southwest Airlines to do in Texas what PSA had done in California. PSA provided assistance to Southwest in establishing itself and Southwest acknowledged the debt.

Friedkin's son, Thomas Friedkin, was a PSA pilot and a member of the board of directors until the airline was purchased by US Air in 1987. Tom Friedkin made an astute investment in a Toyota distributor in the late 1960s that multiplied the family's wealth many times over. As of 2024, Gulf States Toyota is a multibillion dollar business run by Tom's son, Dan Friedkin.

In 2015, Friedkin was inducted into the International Air & Space Hall of Fame at the San Diego Air & Space Museum.

== Friedkin's companies ==
- Friedkin Aeronautics Inc. (later Pacific Southwest Airlines Inc.) - Parent company for most of Friedkin's businesses
  - Plosser-Friedkin School (Friedkin School of Aeronautics)
  - Friedkin Airlines
  - Pacific Southwest Airlines
- The Giles Company - Aviation leasing company
