= 30West =

American film production company

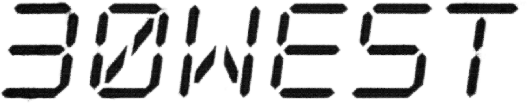
- Type: Private
- Industry: Film
- Founded: 2017; 9 years ago
- Founder: Dan Friedkin; Micah Green
- Headquarters: 1663 18th Street, Santa Monica, California, United States
- Area served: United States
- Subsidiaries: Neon (5%); Altitude Film Distribution (5%); Creature Comforts Brewing Co. (30%); Constellation Immersive (30%); BlueEcho (30%)
- Website: 30west.com

30West (stylized in all caps) is an American independent film production, distribution, and sales company founded in 2017 by Dan Friedkin and Micah Green.

The company is most known for co-distributing, I, Tonya (2017), and producing Destroyer (2018), Ben Is Back (2018), Late Night (2019), and Triangle of Sadness (2022). It also produced the television series Tiger King.

== History ==
In April 2017, it was announced Dan Friedkin and Micah Green would launch a company focusing on investing capital in independent film production. In September 2017, it was announced the company would be named 30West, and would additionally handle sales on projects.

The company co-distributed I, Tonya with Neon, Colette with Bleecker Street, and Beast with Roadside Attractions. The company handled the sales for films including Assassination Nation, The Souvenir, and Flee.

The company has invested in Neon, Altitude Film Distribution, Creature Comforts Brewing Co., Constellation Immersive and recently in 2025 the independent film company BlueEcho founded in Detroit, Michigan.
