= Pacific Southwest Airlines =

US intrastate airline based in San Diego (1949–1988)

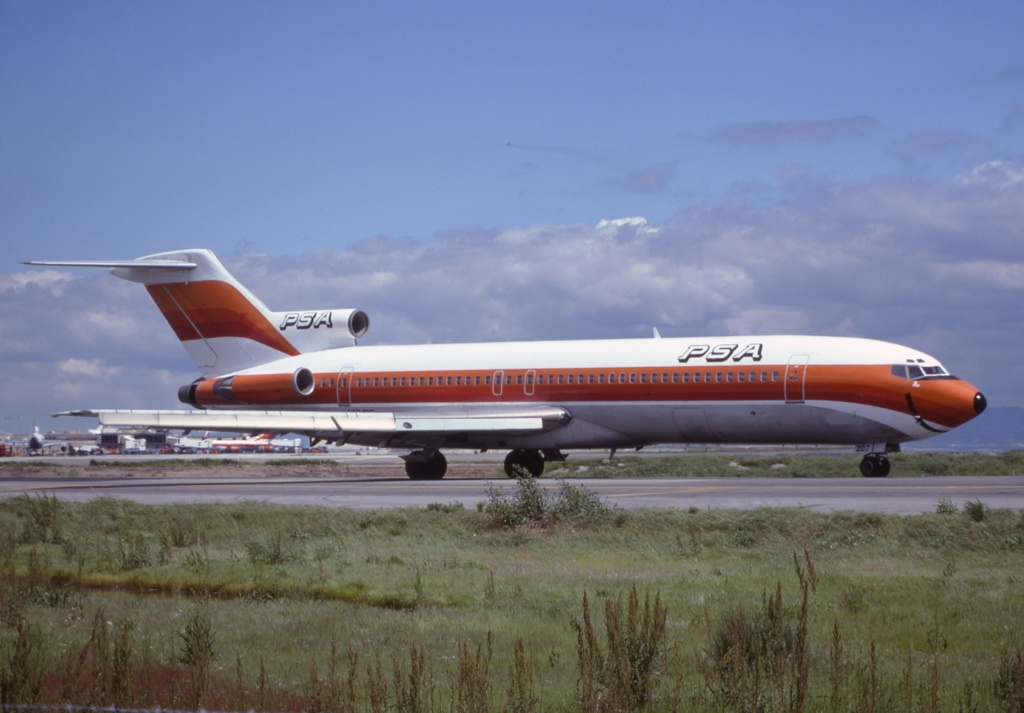
- A Boeing 727-200 of PSA
IATA	ICAO	Call sign
PS	PSA	PSA
- Founded: May 6, 1949 in San Diego, California
- Commenced operations: May 6, 1949
- Ceased operations: April 9, 1988 (merged into USAir)
- Hubs: Los Angeles; San Diego; San Francisco
- Parent company: PSA, Inc. (1973–1986); PS Group, Inc. (1986–1987); US Airways Group (1987–1988)
- Headquarters: San Diego, California, United States
- Key people: Kenny Friedkin; J. Floyd Andrews

Pacific Southwest Airlines (PSA) was a low-cost airline in the United States headquartered in San Diego, California, that operated from 1949 to 1988. Founded by Kenny Friedkin and J. Floyd Andrews, it was the first substantial scheduled discount airline. PSA called itself "The World's Friendliest Airline" and painted a smile on the nose of its airplanes, the PSA Grinningbirds. The Los Angeles Times called PSA "practically the unofficial flag carrier airline of California for almost forty years".

For three quarters of its existence, PSA operated as a California intrastate airline. PSA's early success as an intrastate airline served as a model for Southwest Airlines, which did in Texas what PSA had done in California. After the Airline Deregulation Act of 1978, PSA expanded to cities in other US western states and Mexico. However, PSA's performance in the new deregulated era was disappointing relative to that of Southwest and PSA's former fellow California intrastate carrier AirCal.

In 1986, USAir agreed to purchase PSA, the transaction closed in 1987 and PSA was integrated into USAir in 1988. The PSA acquisition gave USAir a network on the West Coast, but by 1991 USAir had largely withdrawn from California in the face of fierce fare wars driven, in significant part, by the spread of Southwest. Today's American Airlines Group continues to protect the PSA trademark by using it as a name for a regional airline subsidiary, PSA Airlines. PSA did not survive for long after deregulation, but its influence lives on through the continued success of Southwest.

== History ==
PSA 1953 logo

=== Startup, early competition ===
PSA started as an offshoot of San Diego–based Friedkin Aeronautics, the flight school Kenny Friedkin started to train returning GIs. When GI business dried up, on May 6, 1949, Friedkin started flying once a week from San Diego to Oakland via Burbank with a $1,000-a-month leased Douglas DC-3. Friedkin obtained information from a travel agent upon starting the airline due to lessons learned from a failed precursor airline (Friedkin Airlines). Reservations were initially taken at a World War II surplus latrine refitted as a ticket office. The original fare from Burbank to Oakland was $9.99. In July 1951 PSA added a flight to San Francisco. Oakland was dropped in 1954, but restored to the system in 1965. DC-3s went in and out of the fleet, but the total number was never more than four.

PSA was one of eight California intrastate carriers that started flying in the 13 month period from January 1949 through January 1950 - but only California Central Airlines (CCA) and PSA lasted longer than a year. CCA started in January 1949 and through its demise in February 1955 was larger, and flew better equipment (Martin 2-0-2s) than PSA. But CCA was not as focused as PSA (which stuck just to the San Diego to Bay Area route) and ultimately went bankrupt. PSA bid on CCA in the bankruptcy auction, but lost to a group composed of Allegheny Airlines and Southwest Airways (no relation to today's Southwest Airlines) which shut CCA immediately, leaving PSA as the only intrastate competitor.

California Central Airlines and Pacific Southwest Airlines annual passengers, 1949–1954
Passengers	1949	1950	1951	1952	1953	1954
California Central Airlines	73,487	93,045	145,101	190,187	148,091	162,012
Pacific Southwest Airlines	15,011	45,390	75,995	92,484	115,028	102,124

=== Better aircraft, expansion ===
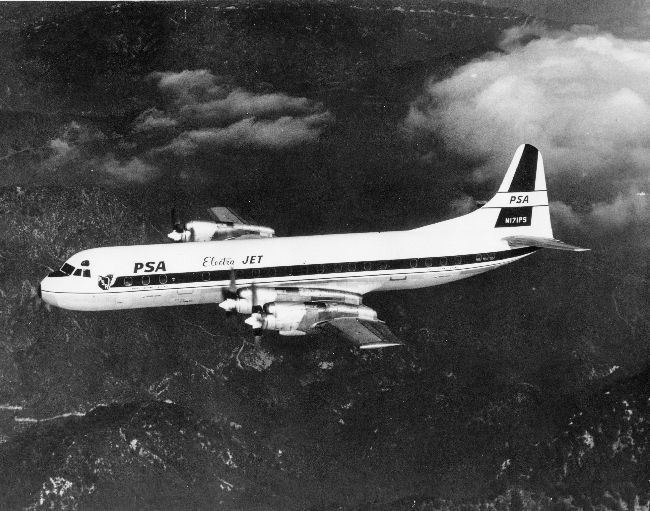
Lockheed L-188 Electra of PSA around 1959

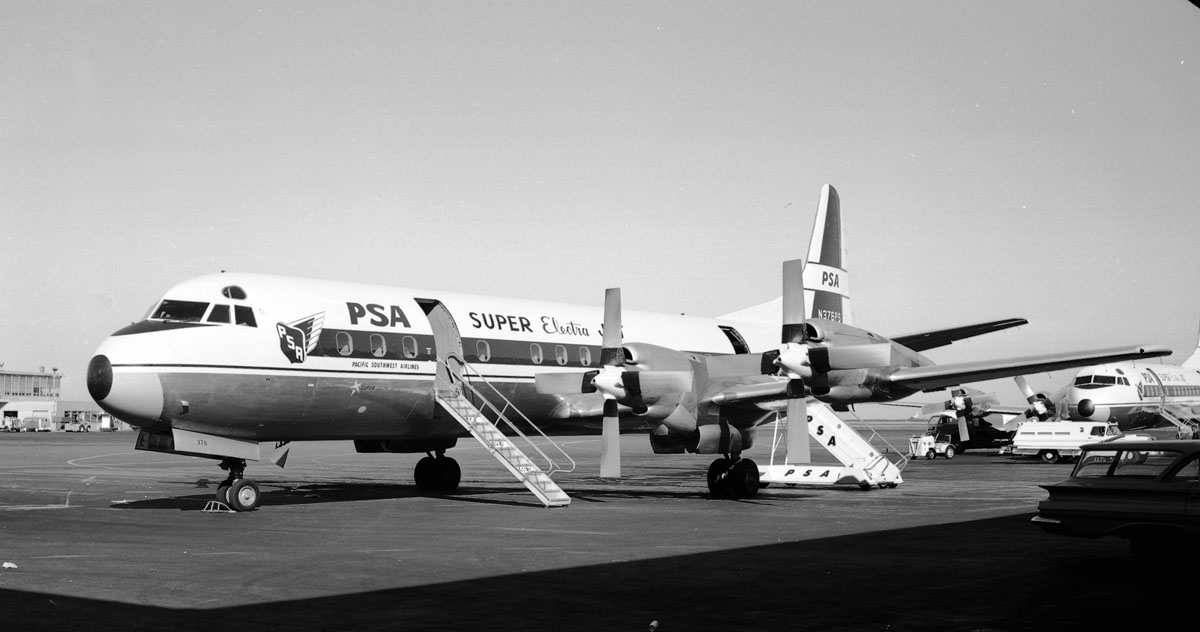
San Francisco 1963

In 1955, four Douglas DC-4s replaced the DC-3s, with PSA painting rectangles around the windows to make them resemble the more modern Douglas DC-6.

In January 1958, PSA scheduled 37 DC-4s a week Burbank to San Francisco (29 of which originated in San Diego) and four nonstops San Diego to San Francisco; United Airlines, Western Airlines and TWA then scheduled a total of 241 nonstop flights each week from Los Angeles to San Francisco, plus 49 flights a week from Burbank to San Francisco. About half of these flights by the competition were First Class only ($22.05); the rest carried coach passengers for $13.50, all fares subject to then 5% federal excise tax. In July 1958 PSA shifted some flights from Burbank to Los Angeles International Airport (LAX); that year it carried 296,000 passengers.

In late 1959, PSA began flying Lockheed Electra turboprops with 92 seats and a six-seat lounge, replacing 70-seat DC-4s. In 1963 PSA got its sixth Electra; by then it carried more passengers between the Bay Area and Los Angeles than any other airline. Total PSA passengers climbed from 355,000 in 1959 to 1,305,000 in 1963 and 5,162,000 in 1970.

=== Public company ===
On March 16, 1962, founder Kenny Friedkin, only 47 years old, died of a cerebral hemorrhage. He had lived to see his airline become a success, but it was still tiny, with only five aircraft. J. Floyd Andrews, one of Friedkin's fellow founders, took over. Andrews's era was tumultuous, PSA achieving a high national profile. This was the era of hot-pant clad flight attendants on pink-liveried aircraft, a classic image of California in the late 1960s and early 1970s. As discussed below, PSA became utterly dominant in the intra-California market, but also overreached to the point it almost went bankrupt.

Less than a year later, PSA went public, with a February 14, 1963, initial public offering, 313,000 shares (100,000 of them primary) at $19. Preparations had been underway for some time. PSA had an unusual corporate structure, with its aircraft owned through three companies owned by founders (Friedkin and others). In January 1962, these were merged into PSA. Prospectus facts that caught the eye of one observer included:

- With only five 98-seat Electras, PSA nonetheless had the second-highest passenger marketshare in San Francisco, and the fifth largest in Los Angeles.
- Speedy 20 minute aircraft turnarounds and no-frills service.
- Nine months profit to September 30, 1962, of over $1 million (at a time when the Los Angeles to San Francisco fare was just $13.50)
- 937,000 passengers carried between San Francisco and Los Angeles in 11 months ending November 30, 1962, compared to 642,000 in the same period the prior year.

Pacific Southwest Airlines Financial Results, 1955 thru 1965
(USD 000)	1955	1956	1957	1958	1959	1960	1961	1962	1963	1964	1965
Op revenue	1,588	2,265	3,126	3,930	4,776	8,130	10,300	14,205	17,852	20,773	24,015
Op profit	64	120	399	663	909	21	1,127	3,402	4,952	5,946	4,410
Net profit	244	59	197	322	456	0	310	1,369	2,252	2,946	2,035
Op margin	4.1%	5.3%	12.8%	16.9%	19.0%	0.3%	10.9%	23.9%	27.7%	28.6%	18.4%
Net margin	15.4%	2.6%	6.3%	8.2%	9.5%	0.0%	3.0%	9.6%	12.6%	14.2%	8.5%

=== CPUC era, 1965–1978 ===
Until 1965, as an intrastate airline PSA had a free hand in terms of how and where it flew within California. The California Public Utilities Commission (CPUC) was limited to regulating PSA's prices. So long as PSA stayed within the boundaries of an intrastate airline, the federal Civil Aeronautics Board (CAB), which otherwise tightly regulated US airlines, had no say, though as with any US airline, the Federal Aviation Administration (FAA) operationally regulated PSA. As of September 17, 1965, the CPUC had new powers over California intrastate airlines of economic certification (PSA was grandfathered) route entry/exit and service quality (e.g. frequency).

PSA was in favor of this. In the early 1960s, a number of new entrant California intrastate carriers had come and gone, the most notorious being Paradise Airlines, which had a terrible accident in 1964. PSA believed it would benefit from market stability, but observers predicted that over time the CPUC would become just as restrictive as the CAB, which, in fact, happened. From 1965 through US airline deregulation in 1978, the CPUC certified only two intrastate airlines: Air California and Holiday Airlines. From September 17, 1965, through 1978, PSA had to apply to the CPUC for all new routes, generally in competition with Air California.

=== Air California and lost opportunity ===
Despite having total network freedom, PSA evolved its network minimally from 1949 to 1965: it served only five airports: San Diego, LAX, Burbank, San Francisco and Oakland. In 1965, Orange County Airport (later John Wayne Airport (SNA)), had a new runway. It approached PSA (among other airlines) about serving it (SNA had long-standing minimal service from Bonanza Air Lines), and like the others, PSA demurred. This was a mistake:

- The CPUC certificated Air California to bring intrastate air service to Orange County, and the airport became a big deal. The County was the fastest growing in the nation in the 1960s, population increasing from 700K in 1960 to 1.4mm in 1970. There was a lot of demand for Orange County service.
- Having certificated Air California, the CPUC was open about its desire that Air California survive, so it kept PSA out of Orange County, gave other desirable routes to Air California and otherwise took steps to protect it. The CPUC assigned routes to PSA or Air California but rarely both. Despite a rocky first five years, Air California survived and the CPUC ensured minimal competition between it and PSA.

PSA tried to buy Air California twice:

- In December 1969, an ailing Air California agreed to a merger, but the CPUC was slow to approve. In May 1970, PSA withdrew, citing the slow CPUC, and almost immediately thereafter, San Diego tycoon C. Arnholt Smith took control of Air California through his Westgate-California Corporation (WCC).
- In mid 1972, PSA agreed to buy WCC's majority stake in Air California. Against heavy opposition, the CPUC agreed to the merger when WCC said it would no longer fund Air California losses. However, the US Department of Justice sued to prevent the merger, noting PSA had a 70% intra California market share and Air California had an 11% share. By now a year had passed. PSA withdrew from the merger after Air California auditors withdrew certification of 1971 and 1972 financial statements, one of the first steps in a scandal that enveloped C. Arnholt Smith including the 1973 seizure of his bank, the largest in San Diego, and the 1974 bankruptcy of WCC.

=== 1960s–1970s fleet ===
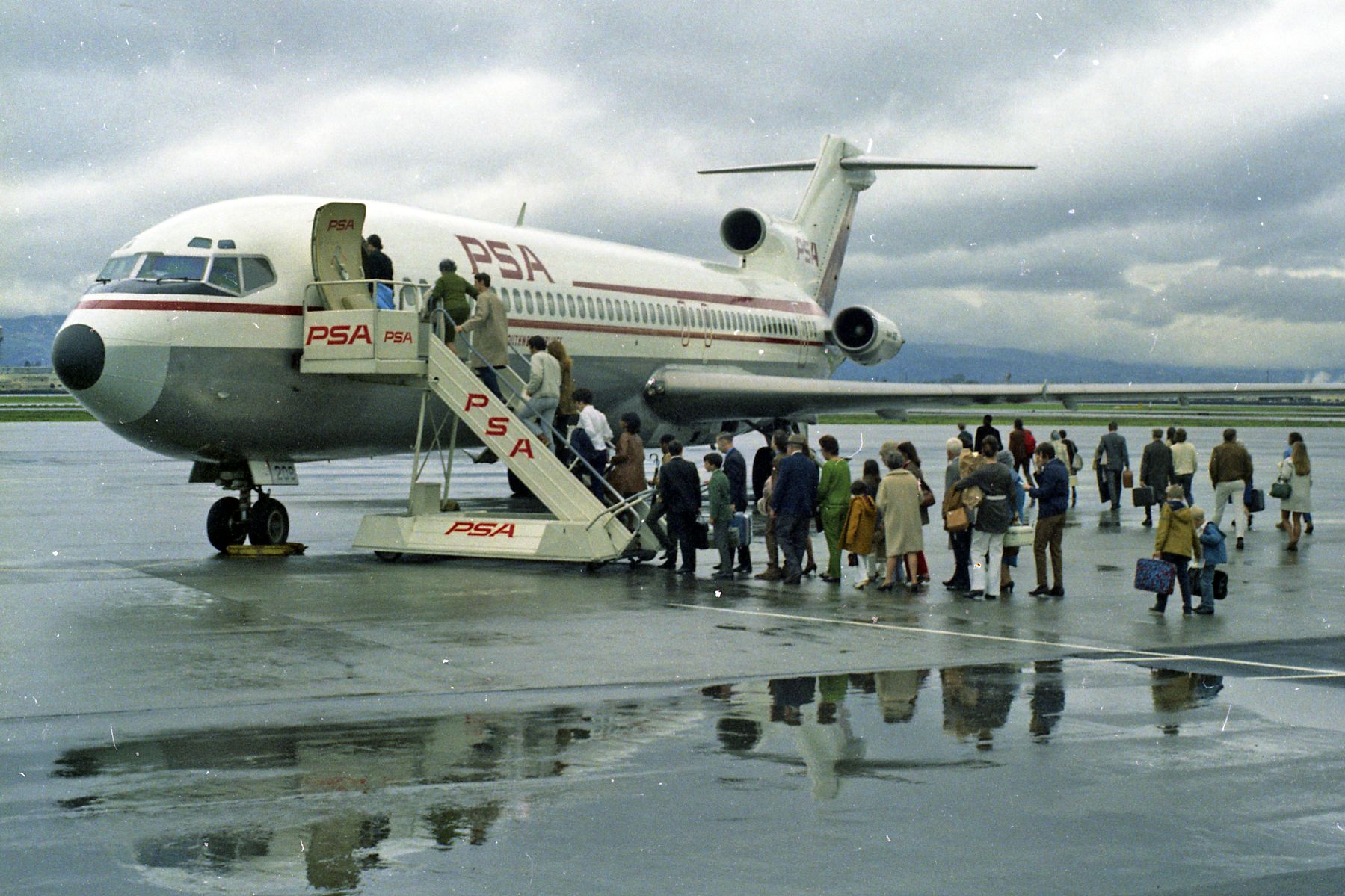
Boeing 727-200 in 1971

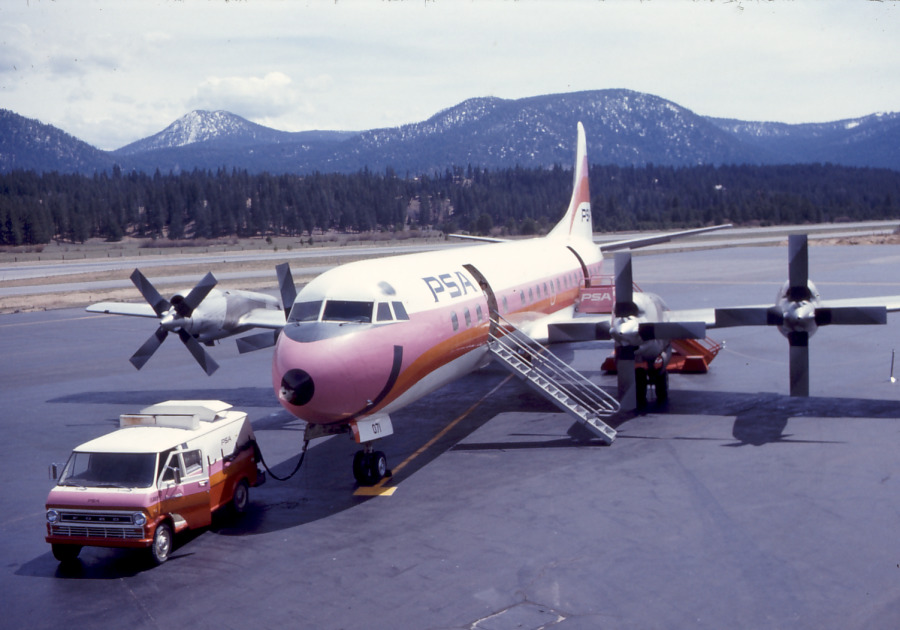
Electra South Lake Tahoe 1977

PSA’s fleet changed constantly in the 1960s and 1970s. The 1960s started with Electras, then Boeing 727-100s arrived in 1965, PSA's first pure jet. The last Electra flight was September 1968 By 1969, PSA was swapping out 727-100s and replacing them with bigger 727-200s plus 737-200s. At the beginning of 1970, the fleet comprised one 727-100, 16 727-200s and nine 737s. In the late 1960s PSA also briefly had DC-9s, the justification was to train pilots of other airlines. As discussed below, the L-1011s made a brief appearance in 1974-1975, but by then PSA was shedding the 737s; the last left in the fleet in 1976. In 1975, Lockheed Electras returned to support flights to Tahoe (see below). Other than the Electras (required to operate to Tahoe), PSA settled on 727s in the late 1970s, acquiring used 727-100s as well as additional new 727-200s.

PSA entered Tahoe after Holiday Airlines collapsed. Holiday basically served nowhere other than Tahoe, a choice that sealed its fate. PSA applied to the CPUC for Holiday's routes in 1974 Holiday said it couldn’t afford to defend itself in front of the CPUC and went out of business in February 1975. The CPUC split the Tahoe routes between Air California and PSA on an emergency basis, but required the two carriers use Electras for Tahoe. One of PSA's first actions of the deregulated era (which started January 1, 1979) was to exit Tahoe, citing the high cost of Electras in a fleet that otherwise comprised 31 727s.

In 1967 PSA was finally allowed to use offshore airway V25 to San Diego, despite being an intrastate airline.

=== Attempted Western Air Lines merger ===
An early indication that, for J. Floyd Andrews, PSA was not enough came in December 1968 with an audacious bid for Western Air Lines, then under attack by Kirk Kerkorian. Western was four times the revenue of PSA, and as an interstate carrier, regulated by the CAB. It was unclear how this would work, putting together two airlines with different regulators, whether CAB approval would be forthcoming. PSA pulled the bid in April 1969, citing deteriorating Western results. By that time, Kerkorian was, while not a majority owner of Western, difficult to dislodge, controlling nine out of 21 seats on the board. As outlined in a section below, PSA instead pursued a non-airline acquisition strategy.

=== Southwest Airlines ===
Southwest Airlines was founded in 1967, but grueling legal challenges caused its operational start to be delayed until June 1971. Founder Rollin King took inspiration from PSA. Founding president Lamar Muse was open about the debt to PSA, saying "we don't mind being copycats of an operation like that", including hotpants. PSA hosted King and Muse for a four day visit in 1971 and gave them a copy of PSA's FAA operating manuals, from which Southwest created its own in what Muse said was "primarily a copy-and-paste procedure". PSA helping Southwest made sense in 1971, with each airline strictly limited to flying within its state and seemingly no prospect of that ever changing. Mutual admiration was expressed monetarily: in 1978, Southwest management and directors owned 6% of PSA, while PSA directors and management owned 10% of Southwest.

=== Laid low by diversification and widebodies ===
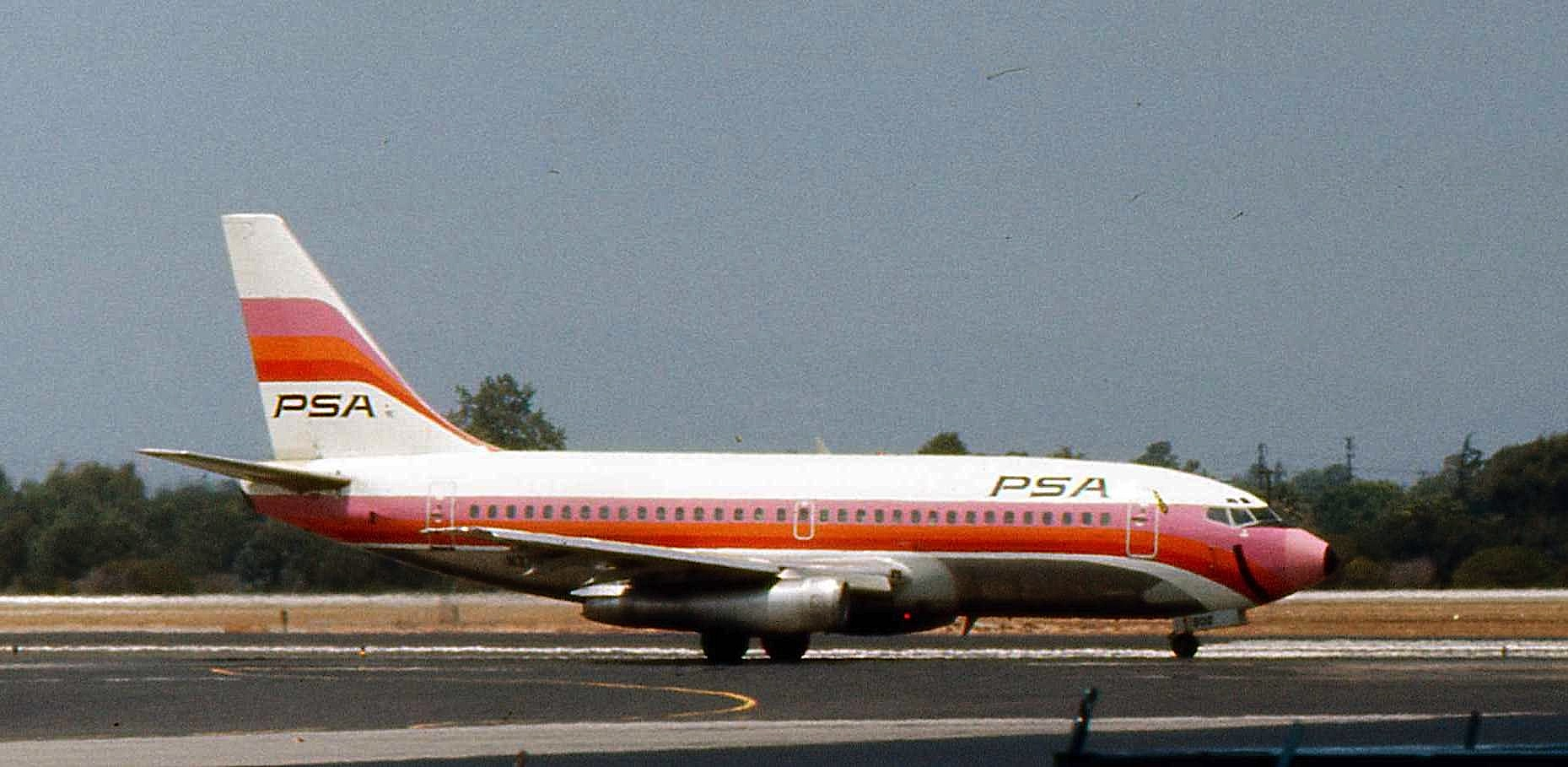
Boeing 737-200 with the “smiling” livery in 1974

In July 1968, PSA bought rental car company Valcar, a former Hertz subsidiary with a west-coast presence. Like PSA, Valcar had a budget orientation, but PSA couldn't make it work and shut it down in 1971, after failing to sell it.

In April 1969, PSA bought the San Franciscan Hotel in downtown San Francisco. In June, PSA bought the Islandia in San Diego's Mission Bay. In June 1971, PSA committed to a to-be constructed hotel at the Los Angeles Hollywood Park Racetrack (now the site of SoFi Stadium), and in December 1971, committed to a to-be constructed hotel within the Queen Mary attraction in Long Beach The synergies were not obvious. None of the hotels were located at airports, none of them were value-oriented. In 1973, CEO Andrews called the hotels "a complete flop" and in 1974 gave three of them to Hyatt to run. It took years for PSA to extricate itself. In 1979, PSA finally sold the San Franciscan but had yet to sell the Queen Mary hotel.

In August 1970, PSA started buying radio stations. By 1975, its four stations were for sale. PSA also bought a catamaran. In 1973, PSA created a holding company, "PSA, Inc." for the airline and many non-airline subsidiaries.

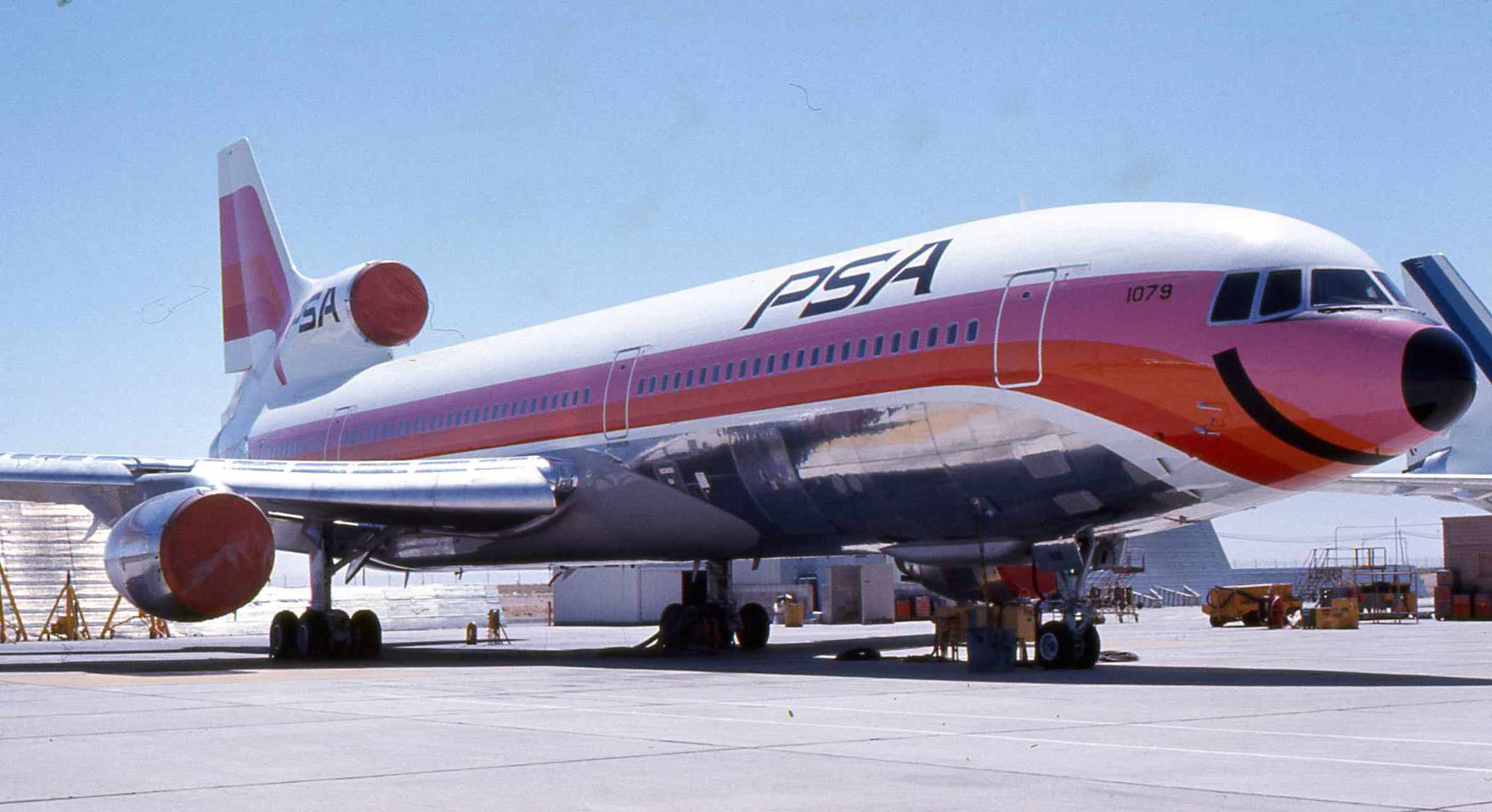
Lockheed L-1011 pre-delivery

In late summer 1970, PSA ordered five Lockheed L-1011 widebody aircraft, deliveries starting 1972. In the next 12 months, the L-1011 engine maker, Rolls-Royce, went bankrupt, and Lockheed required a US government bailout to avoid the same. In December 1971, PSA cancelled the order, but Lockheed said it couldn't. In September 1972, PSA signed a new order, deliveries starting 1974. PSA grounded its two L-1011s after eight months. A 300 seat aircraft never made sense in a business model that depended on quick aircraft turnarounds. Economics presented to the CPUC showed L-1011 per-seat costs no better than a 727 despite being twice as large. PSA refused the last three aircraft and was stuck paying a 15-year lease on the first two. It entered into years of litigation with Lockheed.

By 1975, losses from diversification and L-1011s brought PSA to the brink of bankruptcy. Operating losses on rental cars, radio stations and hotels through 1974 (not including cost of acquisition) were almost $9M. Through 1977, PSA lost another $1M on discontinued businesses and recognized $18mm in L-1011 losses. In 1982, PSA took another $4.2M loss against its two L-1011s, still unable to find a home for them. PSA's troubles attracted national attention. PSA went to the CPUC asking for a fare increase to bail them out. The CPUC excoriated PSA, questioning management competency at length and especially withering about a 1974 $8mm share buyback. In March 1976, J. Floyd Andrews gave up the CEO position, and in May, resigned as chair of the board.

=== Getting out from under the CPUC ===
As airline deregulation was being debated, for most of the country, it promised lower prices. But California already had lower prices, set by the CPUC. By comparison, in Texas, Southwest Airlines set its own fares, the Texas Aeronautics Commission didn’t get involved. The concern (and expectation) was deregulation would lead to higher prices. California legislators and governor Jerry Brown wanted the CPUC to remain in charge of any airline that did over 50% of its business in California. This amendment was voted down in the relevant US House of Representatives subcommittee by one vote. Instead, deregulation as passed included strong Federal preemption – states had little say over an airline with a Federal certificate.

By then, the CPUC had become the restrictive bureaucracy observers had predicted when it was given additional powers in 1965, second-guessing (in glacial and burdensome processes that could and did last for years) everything California intrastate carriers did, and even itself, as exemplified in the role the CPUC played in the 1975 demise of Holiday Airlines. PSA also played a special role at the CPUC. It was assumed to be the most efficient carrier, therefore CPUC fares were set relative to what would make the highest permissible profit for PSA – all other carriers operating in California then had to toe that line. So PSA had ample reason to regret its support of that 1965 legislation. However, under the Airline Deregulation Act, the minute PSA started flying to Nevada in December 1978, it was free of the CPUC. The CPUC didn’t take that lying down. The CPUC sued in Federal court to overturn the Airline Deregulation Act, lost, appealed, and lost again.

=== Flight 182 ===
As the regulated era drew to a close, PSA suffered a fatal accident in September 1978 when a Boeing 727 collided with a small aircraft over San Diego, killing all occupants of both aircraft and several people on the ground. The impact on PSA was compounded by:

- The presence of a large number of deadheading employees on board, resulting in the deaths of 37 PSA employees out of 135
- The fact that San Diego was the company's hometown
- The flight crew’s failure to maintain visual separation from the smaller aircraft prior to the collision

=== Harold Simmons ===
At the end of 1978 it transpired corporate raider Harold Simmons had accumulated a 20% stake. When PSA, appealing to investors, referred to a 30-year history of success, Simmons printed ads summarizing PSA’s far-from-successful 1970s financials and noting 1977 profits were about half those of 1971, despite revenues almost twice as large. But as PSA said, Andrews was gone. Simmons evinced no desire to "destroy" PSA, seeing it instead as a takeover candidate from which he could profit. PSA won a shareholder vote to implement takeover defenses with just a bit more than 50% but the company had post-dated the shareholder record date to ensure Simmons couldn’t vote his whole stake. Simmons said he’d sue. In the end, PSA paid him off by giving him some aircraft in exchange for his stake. To be fair, notwithstanding Flight 182, PSA’s 1978 financials were somewhat better, but significantly flattered by an accounting change.

=== PSA on the brink of deregulation ===
As PSA headed towards deregulation, both the airline and Wall Street thought it would be a winner. But in December 1978, Paul Barkley, then PSA’s chief operating officer (later CEO), spoke about the deregulated future a few weeks away. He expected something fairly sedate, quite different from the bitter Darwinistic struggle that would engulf the industry:

- Discounted airfares would fade away due to a shortage of aircraft and “passenger capacity”. Another factor against discount airfares was that they were too hard to administer.
- Capacity would be tight through the mid-1980s due to lack of aircraft
- The airline industry would be healthier in deregulation, there would be no revolutionary changes. Competition would not be intense, again, due to lack of aircraft.

Pacific Southwest Airlines^{(1)} Financial Results, 1979 thru 1986
(USD mm)	1979	1980	1981	1982	1983	1984	1985	1986
Op revenue	293.0	301.6	335.2	378.1	443.9	505.4	582.8	694.1
Op profit (loss)	35.5	2.6	(16.0)	(17.4)	(10.0)	31.0	31.9	23.0
Net profit (loss)	23.1	4.2	22.7	18.6	(12.6)	(4.8)	(0.6)	(3.1)
Op margin	12.1%	0.9%	-4.8%	-4.6%	-2.3%	6.1%	5.5%	3.3%
Net margin	7.9%	1.4%	6.8%	4.9%	-2.8%	-0.9%	-0.1%	-0.4%
(1) Solely the airline, not the holding company containing the airline and other subsidiaries.

=== Striking out in Texas ===
Dallas-Fort Worth–based Braniff International Airways was the first trunk carrier to fail after deregulation. US trunk airlines were the descendants of the original 16 airlines certified by the CAB and thereafter regulated to be the main US carriers. Braniff had been successful just prior to deregulation, but Harding Lawrence, Braniff’s imperious long-time leader, expanded the carrier excessively immediately after deregulation, resulting in its May 1982 bankruptcy and shut-down. Until Continental did so in 1983, no one knew an airline could recover from Chapter 11 bankruptcy.

In October 1982, PSA announced a cheap and low-risk deal to expand into a new geography: under an eight year contract, Braniff would fly 25 to 30 727s from its Texas base with PSA colors and marketing, employing 1,500 Braniff employees (who would have to agree to lower wages and higher productivity) as well as gates and takeoff/landing slots. These slots were key Braniff assets. In the wake of the August 1981 air traffic controllers strike, the FAA had limited air traffic control capacity, so allocated each airline takeoff/landing slots at specific airports. When Braniff collapsed, those rights were temporarily allocated to others. If Braniff flew again, it could recover those rights, grounding some operations at other carriers. It was a strong competitive lever.

The initial deal failed when Braniff pilots refused to agree to lower seniority than PSA pilots in the event PSA ever merged with the PSA-Braniff operation (to ensure PSA pilots always got first pick of flying). Pride as well as pay was in play: PSA was perceived as junior-league relative to Braniff. A new deal with Braniff simply equipped a new carrier with Braniff equipment to fly under contract to PSA, sidestepping Braniff’s unions. Braniff would even loan PSA the funds. Further, the FAA noted if Braniff resumed flying it was entitled to its takeoff/landing slots, but a new airline that just happened to use Braniff assets was not. The deal died in March 1983. A second iteration of Braniff did start flying in 1984 without PSA help, ultimately without success, possible due to Texas already being home to Southwest (which, expanding westward, had already entered PSA’s home city of San Diego in January 1982), American Airlines (which viewed Dallas-Fort Worth as its own, having moved its headquarters there in 1979) and Continental Airlines, which in 1983 would go through a bankruptcy that dramatically lowered its costs.

Meanwhile, PSA was making money, but not by flying passengers. In 1982 and 1981 it sold aircraft and tax credits on aircraft to make a net profit while still producing an operating loss.

=== Disappointing deregulation performance ===
In the years prior to deregulation, PSA said it must be ready for the day it was able to fly outside of California. When the day came, PSA management saw themselves as one of the natural beneficiaries of deregulation (see prior sections). But in fact, PSA did poorly. As the nearby table shows, AirCal’s nominal growth from 1978 (the last year of regulation) to 1985 was double that of PSA, Southwest was nearly triple. Perhaps most striking was the comparison of PSA with Piedmont Airlines, which pre-deregulation had been a local service airline regulated by the CAB. Piedmont was smaller than PSA in 1978 but well over twice its size in 1985. Piedmont also had an unbroken string of profits since deregulation.

1985 operating revenue as multiple of 1978 for four airlines^{(1)}
(USD mm)	1978	1985	1985/1979
Pacific Southwest Airlines	229.8	582.8	2.54x
AirCal	67.6	344.5	5.10x
Piedmont Airlines	205.6	1,366.6	6.65x
Southwest Airlines	81.1	606.1^{(2)}	7.48x
(1) In each case, airline revenue only (not including other holding company subsidiaries, if any). (2) Does not include Muse Air, bought by Southwest in 1985.

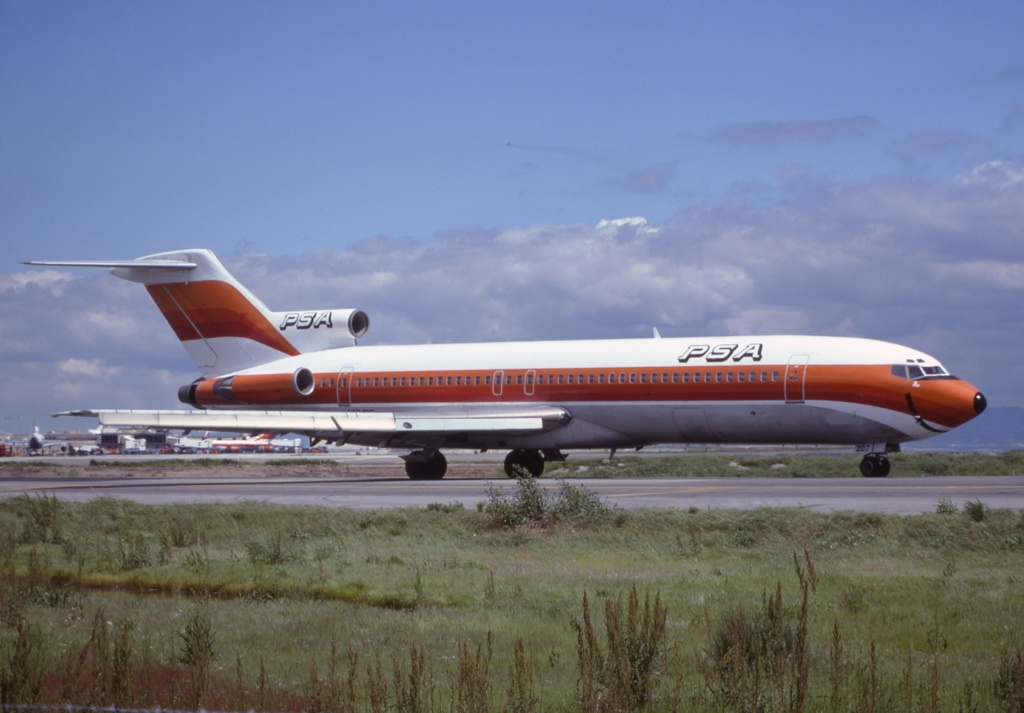
Pre-delivery Boeing 727-200

A July 1984 Los Angeles Times article noted PSA had been hanging fire since deregulation; management always waiting for some obstacle to clear. For instance, waiting to swap out the 727 fleet it had at deregulation (yet the abortive 1982/1983 Braniff deal would have doubled-down on 727s), which were too large and too fuel inefficient (given the rise in fuel prices, which PSA also blamed) and too labor intensive (given its three person cockpit vs two places for the MD-80). 727s were a big factor in driving the company to ordering 20 BAe-146 aircraft in late 1983, which were both smaller and extremely quiet (an advantage in California where noise politics was a factor at airports like Orange County, Long Beach and Burbank). PSA may have overcorrected – PSA ultimately configured BAe-146s with only 85 seats vs 150 for the MD-80s and 175 for the 727-200s. In one respect, PSA was lucky: the BAe-146 was eventually notorious for fairly significant engine problems that PSA management never had to deal with because it sold the company before they became well known. As a stopgap, the airline also acquired four 110-seat used DC-9s from Air Canada in 1983. PSA did not prioritize a single fleet type.

But if looking for reasons for underperformance, management might have considered itself, since it was of long-standing. William Shimp, CEO and Chairman from 1976 to 1984, joined PSA in 1949. Paul Barkley, who succeeded Shimp, had been a C-suite officer at PSA since 1967. Notwithstanding the disastrous experience of the 1970s, management never lost its taste for diversification, diverting corporate attention from the airline. PSA, Inc.'s 1983 annual report noted energy subsidiaries involved in fuel supply and distribution and oil and gas exploration and production, as well as aviation-related subsidiaries providing engine maintenance, aircraft leasing and flight training.

=== Employee givebacks, PS Group, sale to USAir and Flight 1771 ===
In 1984, following another poor year in 1983, PSA asked for wage givebacks from airline employees. Employees would reduce pay by 15% in exchange for 15% of pre-tax airline profits and a 15% stake in the airline. Note, "airline profits", not the holding company, PSA, Inc., which included aircraft leasing and fuel distribution among other businesses. After some back-and-forth, employees went along with this in late 1984. Employees got to nominate four directors to the airline board. Famed retailer Sol Price of Price Club (a Costco constituent) and FedMart was one such employee director. Another requirement was a separate publicly traded stock for the airline. On July 28, 1986, there was an initial public offering for the airline (1.8mm shares at $7). Meanwhile, to eliminate confusion, the parent company (which retained its own stock listing) was renamed "PS Group, Inc.". In the midst of this activity, the holding company continued to diversify. In September 1985, it added to its oil and gas investments.

1986 was the year of the airline merger – Republic into Northwest, Ozark into TWA, Western into Delta Air Lines and others. In November, AirCal accepted an offer from American Airlines. On December 8, USAir announced an agreement to purchase PSA for $400mm. The combination had its skeptics: USAir’s pre-PSA California presence was 12 flights per day to Pittsburgh and Indianapolis so its brand awareness among Californians was minimal. The purchase closed May 29, 1987, but PSA and USAir pilot union chapters fought over transition agreements, delaying the merger of PSA into USAir beyond the original January 1, 1988, date.

PSA thus still existed under USAir ownership when, on December 7, 1987, a fired USAir employee used his credentials (which had not been recovered from him) to sneak a gun on board PSA Flight 1771. En-route, he shot the flight crew and others, causing the aircraft to crash and killing everyone on board. The fact pattern of a (former) USAir employee killing PSA crew and passengers overshadowed the last days of PSA.

PSA finally merged into USAir on April 9, 1988. PS Group had banked what it was paid for PSA, creating a well-funded life-raft for select former PSA executives, including Chairman Paul Barkley. By the time the merger was consummated, PS Group had used some of the PSA sale money to buy a stake in a travel agency business to go along with its aircraft leasing and oil & gas interests.

== Legacy ==
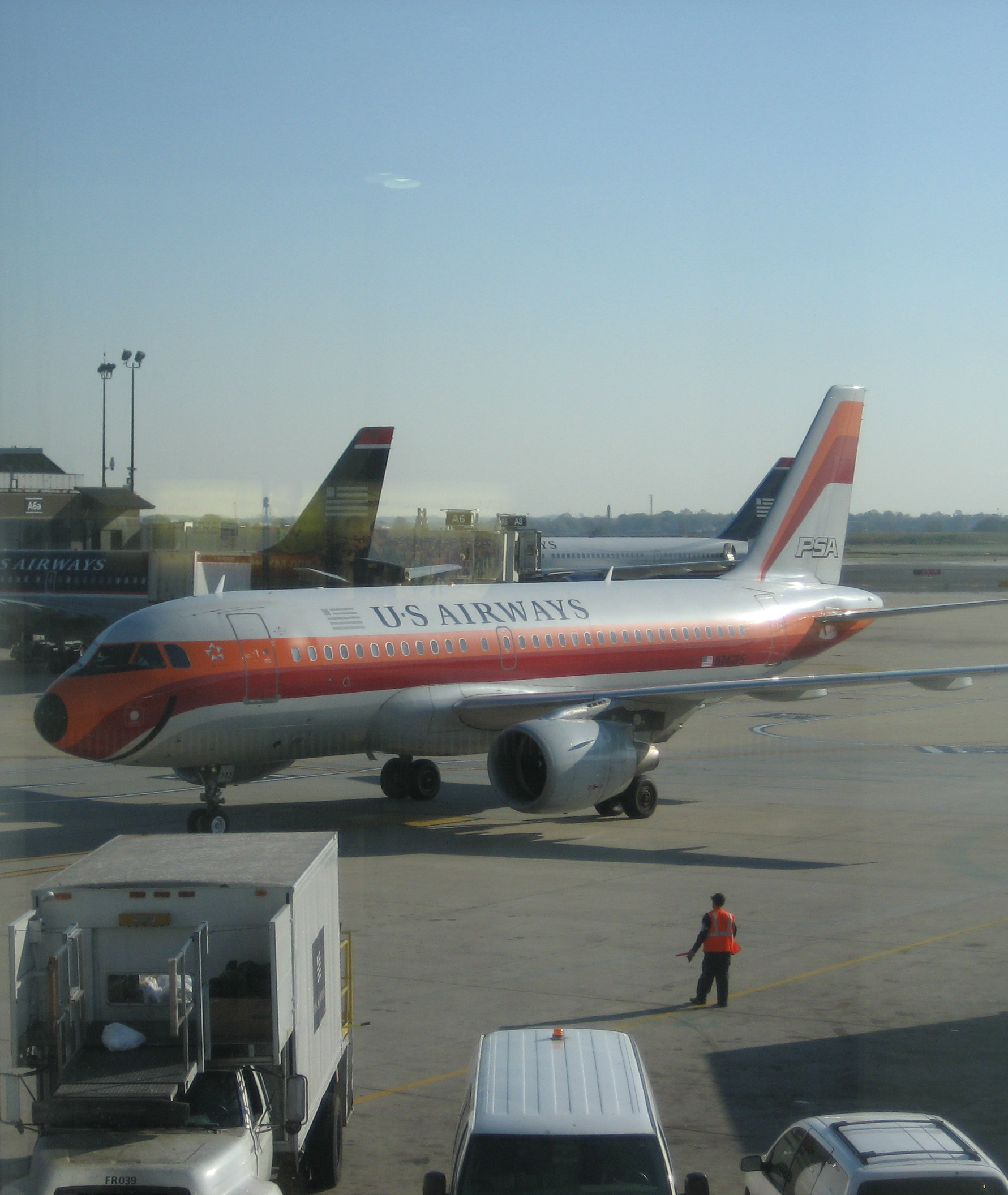
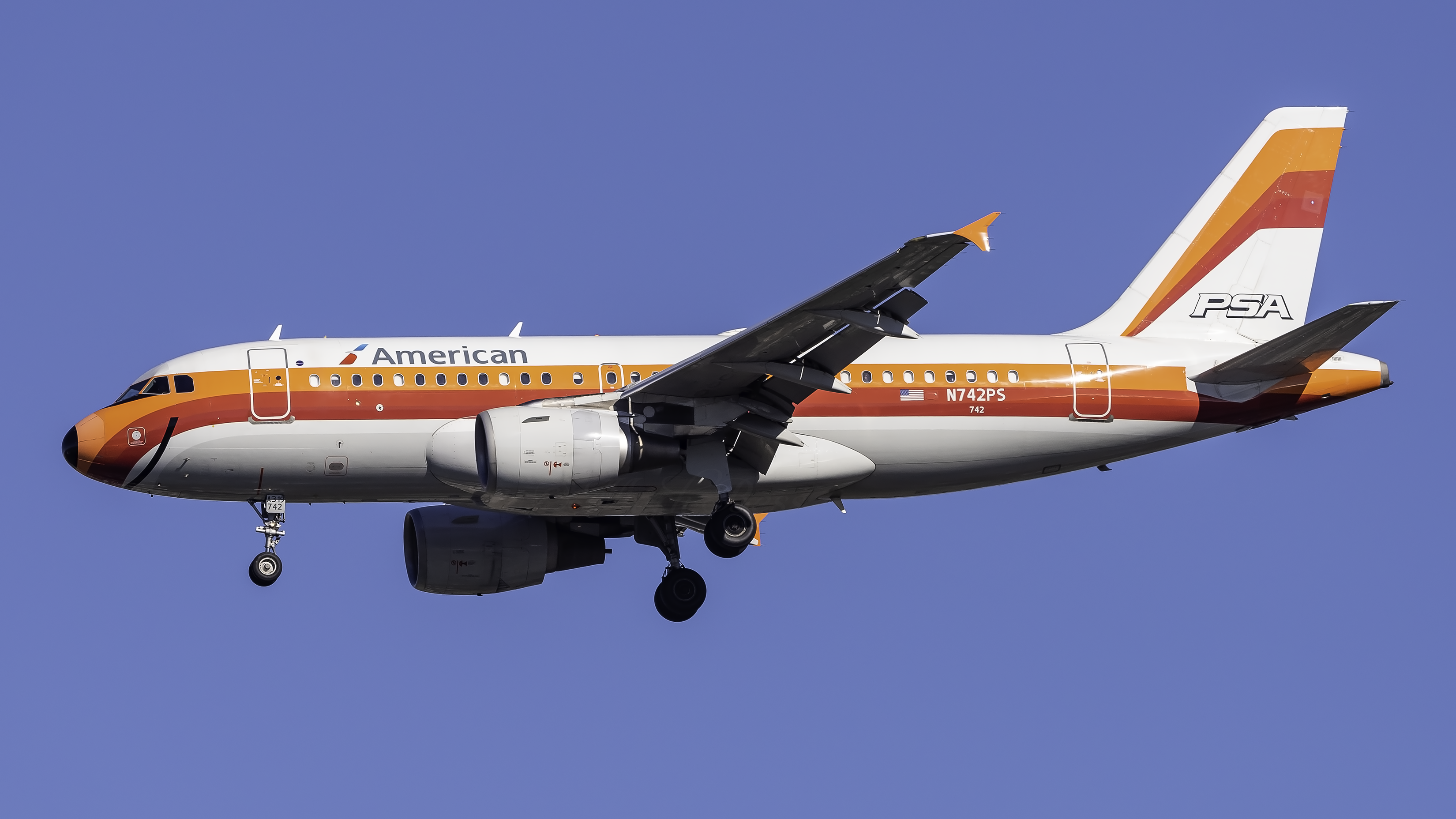
PSA heritage liveries. The top picture shows a US Airways Airbus A319 with the Pacific Southwest livery, and the bottom picture shows the same aircraft in service with American Airlines

The successors of PSA and AirCal, USAir and American, raised prices, reflecting their higher costs. In early 1990, the last-minute roundtrip fare from Los Angeles to Sacramento was $456, over $1000 in 2024 dollars. State legislators were increasingly irate, finally proposing a raft of bills to punish the carriers, even suggesting a state-owned airline, but the market had already taken care of the problem. United Airlines had already announced an increase in frequency on Los Angeles to San Francisco from 16 to 27 per day and Southwest Airlines had announced it was entering Burbank with 10 a day service to Oakland at a last-minute fare of $59 one way, $29 in advance.

The resulting Los Angeles Basin to San Francisco Bay fare war was brutal, made worse when Iraq invaded Kuwait thereby spiking oil prices, collapsing demand for international travel and tipping the US into the Gulf War. In January 1991, in announcements made only two weeks apart, American and USAir dismantled the former AirCal and PSA systems, effectively abandoning the acquisitions less than five years after purchasing the intrastate airlines.

The indirect legacy of PSA is Southwest Airlines, originally a Texas intrastate airline that PSA inspired. Southwest inspired low-cost airlines globally. PSA therefore was a key company in the advent of low-cost air travel.

Another legacy stems from Kenny Friedkin's son Thomas H. Friedkin, a PSA pilot in 1962 when his father died. A year later, Tom's mother (Kenny's widow) died, making him the largest PSA shareholder. Tom had a seat on the Board of Directors but continued as a full-time pilot for the airline. Tom astutely invested in a Toyota distributorship in the late 1960s, Gulf States Toyota, now a multi-billion dollar business run by Tom's son, Kenny's grandson, Dan Friedkin.

PSA's successor airlines also made legacy liveries. US Airways painted an Airbus A319 (N742PS) in the PSA livery and even after US Airways merged with American Airlines, it continued to wear the PSA colours until 2024. American themselves also painted an Airbus A321 (N582UW) in the PSA colours and the A321 still wears the scheme as of 2025.

== Corporate culture ==
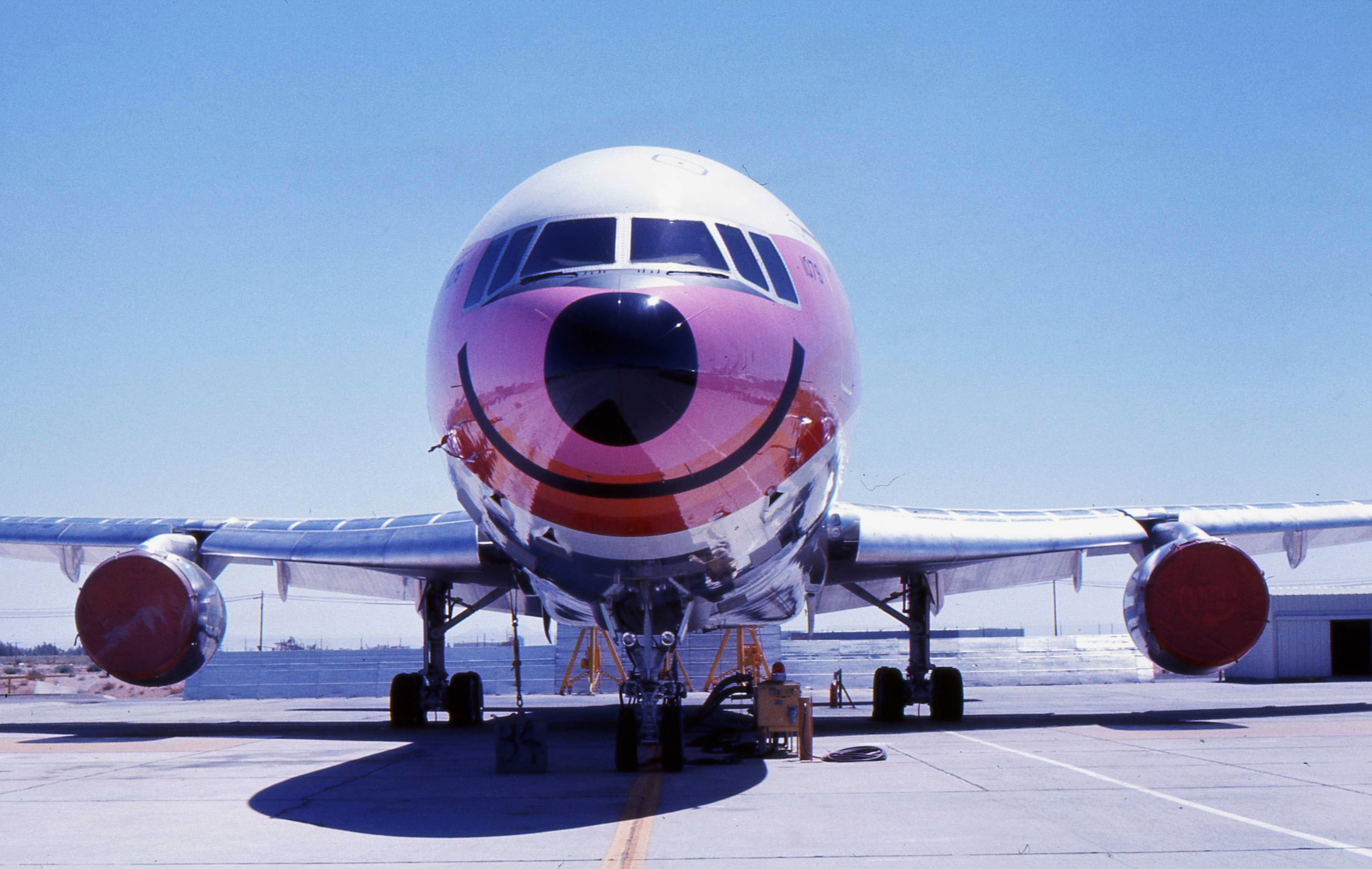
PSA smile on an L-1011

PSA was known for its sense of humor. Founder Ken Friedkin wore Hawaiian shirts and encouraged his pilots and stewardesses to joke with passengers. Its slogan was "The World's Friendliest Airline", and its recognizable trademark was a smile painted on the nose of each plane and an accompanying advertising campaign declaring "Catch Our Smile". Because of the major San Diego flight schedule and its discount fares, military personnel nicknamed PSA the "Poor Sailor's Airline." After PSA was bought by USAir, ex-PSA mechanics would occasionally paint smiles on USAir planes as a joke.

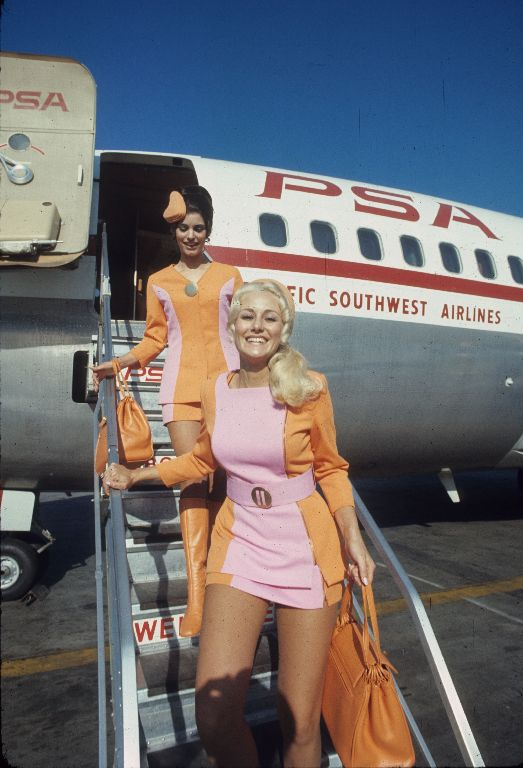
PSA flight attendants in microskirt and boots uniform

In the 1960s PSA was known for the brightly colored flight attendant uniforms, with miniskirts; in the early 1970s the fashion changed to hotpants. PSA wanted to use colors that other airlines did not use to create a corporate image. A PSA flight attendant, Marilyn Tritt, wrote a book about her tenure at the company titled Long Legs and Short Nights.

Throughout PSA's lifetime, the flight attendants, with their humor, over-the-top passenger service, and sense of duty, helped to create a loyal passenger following. One flight attendant, Sandy Daniels, with the help of a frequent flyer, started the "Precious Stewardess Association". Frequent fliers would bring tasty treats to the crew, particularly on morning flights. In turn, PSA started the "Precious Passenger Association", with certificates and free drinks given to friendly and helpful passengers. PSA also occasionally had “lucky seat” giveaways and comedy routines from the crew.

== Headquarters ==
PSA headquarters were a windowless gray-brown building on Harbor Drive in San Diego, California. The building was San Diego International Airport's commuter terminal until 2015 when it was converted into administrative offices of the San Diego County Regional Airport Authority.

== Accidents and incidents ==
- On January 15, 1969, while it was climbing to its cruising altitude, PSA Flight 990, a Boeing 727-100 registered as N973PS, collided with a Cessna 182 registered as N42242 at around what the Cessna 182's pilot, Richard A. Bridgeford, believes was 1,800 feet (550 m). Both aircraft were in controlled airspace on the same frequency. The 727 continued on to Ontario, CA and made a safe landing. The Cessna lost its right wingtip and three-quarters of its right aileron, so Bridgeford decided returning to San Francisco. He also decided to cut his engine and managed to glide to San Francisco International Airport without any further incident. A passenger on board the Boeing 727 reported that he had seen a light plane fly very close to the aircraft. UPI reported that "A PSA spokesman said that a nacelle on one of the engines and the bottom tip of the tail were slightly damaged."
- On March 5, 1974, a PSA NAMC YS-11 training aircraft's engines failed, resulting in the aircraft crashing in the desert near Borrego Springs, California. The turboprop aircraft was doing a simulated landing stall. All of the four crew members survived the crash. The aircraft was written off.
- On September 25, 1978, PSA Flight 182, a Boeing 727-200, crashed in San Diego while trying to land at Lindbergh Field, California, after colliding with a Cessna 172. All 135 aboard the PSA flight were killed, as were the two in the Cessna and seven on the ground. At the time, it was the deadliest plane crash in U.S. airspace; it remains the worst mid-air collision in the United States. A lawsuit argued by Gary Aguirre resulted in a verdict against PSA for damages.
- On December 7, 1987, PSA Flight 1771, a BAe 146, bound for San Francisco from Los Angeles, was airborne above the California central coast when it entered a high-speed nosedive and crashed near the town of Cayucos in San Luis Obispo County. Investigations determined that David Burke, a former US Air employee who had been fired for theft, armed himself and boarded the flight, which was carrying his former manager. After writing a note on an air sickness bag, Burke shot his ex-manager, a flight attendant, both pilots and the airline's chief pilot. Burke then pushed down on the control column, causing the aircraft to enter a dive. There were no survivors among the 38 passengers and five crew.

=== Hijackings ===
There were other attempted hijackings which resulted in no injuries and the surrender of the hijacker(s). These incidents are not included. The following are notable hijackings because of fatalities or because the aircraft flew to another country:

- On January 7, 1972, PSA Flight 902, a Boeing 727-200 flight from San Francisco to Los Angeles was hijacked to Cuba. The captain negotiated the release of the passengers in Los Angeles and the hijackers, who had with them a baby and were armed with a shotgun and other arms, proceeded to Cuba, with a fueling stop in Tampa. Three flight attendants and three off-duty flight attendants accompanied the flight to Cuba.
- On July 5, 1972, PSA Flight 710, a Boeing 737-200 flight from Sacramento to San Francisco was hijacked with demands to fly to the Soviet Union. The plane was stormed while on the ground at San Francisco, resulting in the deaths of one passenger and the two hijackers. One of the passengers, who survived being shot in the back, was the actor Victor Sen Yung, best known as Hop Sing from the Bonanza television series. One other passenger was shot and survived.

== Destinations ==
PSA served the following domestic destinations in the U.S. at various times during its existence.

Arizona

- Phoenix Sky Harbor International Airport, Phoenix (PHX)
- Tucson International Airport, Tucson (TUS)

California

- Arcata-Eureka Airport, Arcata/Eureka (ACV)
- Burbank-Glendale-Pasadena Airport, Burbank (BUR)
- Buchanan Field Airport, Concord (CCR)
- Fresno Yosemite International Airport, Fresno (FAT)
- Lake Tahoe Airport, South Lake Tahoe (TVL)
- Long Beach Airport, Long Beach (LGB)
- Los Angeles International Airport, Los Angeles (LAX)
- Monterey Peninsula Airport, Monterey (MRY)
- Oakland International Airport, Oakland (OAK)
- Ontario International Airport, Ontario (ONT)
- Palm Springs International Airport, Palm Springs (PSP)
- Sacramento Municipal Airport (SAC) – (all airlines serving Sacramento then moved to the then-new SMF in October 1967 and SAC was renamed Sacramento Executive Airport)
- Sacramento Metropolitan Airport, Sacramento (SMF)
- San Diego International Airport, San Diego (SAN) – home base
- San Francisco International Airport, San Francisco (SFO)
- San Jose International Airport, San Jose (SJC)
- John Wayne Airport, Santa Ana (SNA)
- Stockton Metropolitan Airport, Stockton (SCK)

Colorado

- Yampa Valley Airport, Steamboat Springs (HDN)

Idaho

- Boise Air Terminal, Boise (BOI)

New Mexico

- Albuquerque International Sunport, Albuquerque (ABQ)

Nevada

- McCarran International Airport, Las Vegas (LAS)
- Reno-Tahoe International Airport, Reno (RNO)

Oregon

- Eugene Airport-Mahlon Sweet Field, Eugene (EUG)
- Medford-Jackson County Airport, Medford (MFR)
- Portland International Airport, Portland (PDX)
- Redmond-Roberts Field, Redmond (RDM)

Texas

- Dallas, Texas - Love Field (DAL)
- San Antonio, Texas - San Antonio International Airport (SAT)

Utah

- Salt Lake City International Airport, Salt Lake City (SLC)

Washington

- Bellingham International Airport, Bellingham (BLI)
- Pasco-Tri Cities Airport, Pasco (PSC)
- Seattle-Tacoma International Airport, Seattle (SEA)
- Spokane International Airport, Spokane (GEG)
- Yakima Air Terminal, Yakima (YKM)

Mexico

PSA also served the following destinations in Mexico at various times during its existence:

- Los Cabos (Cabo San Lucas) (SJD)
- Mazatlan (MZT)
- Puerto Vallarta (PVR)

== Fleet ==
=== Final fleet ===
As of April 9, 1988, at the time of the merger, Pacific Southwest Airlines' fleet consisted of the following aircraft:

Pacific Southwest Airlines fleet
Aircraft	In service	Passengers	Notes
BAe 146-100	1	85	Transferred to US Airways and retired in 1988.
BAe 146-200	22	85	All were transferred to US Airways and later retired in 1991. One crashed operating as Pacific Southwest Airlines Flight 1771 in 1987.
McDonnell Douglas DC-9-32	4	100	Former Altair Airlines fleet. All were transferred to US Airways and later retired in 2001.
McDonnell Douglas MD-81	21	150	All were transferred to US Airways and later retired in 2002.
McDonnell Douglas MD-82	10	150	All were transferred to US Airways and later retired in 2002.
Total	58		

=== Retired fleet ===
Pacific Southwest Airlines previously operated the following aircraft:

Pacific Southwest Airlines retired fleet
Aircraft	Total	Introduced	Retired	Notes
Bell 206	1	1967	Unknown	
Boeing 727-100	16	1965	1983	Single aircraft listed in 1975 Directory
Boeing 727-200	33	1968	1985	21 aircraft listed in 1975 Directory; One crashed in 1978 as Flight 182
Boeing 737-200	14	1968	1976	3 aircraft listed in 1975 Directory
Douglas DC-3/C-47 Skytrain	9	1949	1955	
Douglas C-54 Skymaster	4	1955	1961	
Douglas DC-6B	1	1960	1963	Operated to Oakland while awaiting Electras.
Lockheed L-188A Electra	4	1961	1979	Type was in the fleet during two different time periods. (Note: Originally, six L-188 examples were delivered new or used by Lockheed to PSA, between 1959 and 1963. The aircraft were retired in 1968 in favor of newer jet aircraft, including the Boeing 727, Boeing 737 and McDonnell Douglas DC-9. Four L-188 aircraft, including one aircraft previously owned by PSA, were purchased used or leased, between 1975 and 1977, due to jet aircraft restrictions at Lake Tahoe Airport. Due to high operating costs, service to Lake Tahoe was discontinued and the four aircraft were sold in 1979.)
Lockheed L-188C Electra	5	1959	1979	Type was in the fleet during two different time periods.
Lockheed L-1011 TriStar	2 (Note: A total of five L-1011-1 aircraft were initially ordered from Lockheed by PSA. The airline only accepted the delivery of two aircraft, with the examples being operated briefly as high capacity commuter aircraft. The further three examples were cancelled during production and were resold by Lockheed to LTU International.)	1974	1975	Used briefly between Los Angeles and San Francisco and San Diego. Only widebody aircraft operated by PSA.
McDonnell Douglas DC-9-31	2	1967 (Note: Two DC-9-30 aircraft were delivered to PSA in 1967 new. These were operated and owned, prior to the four ex-Air Canada DC-9-32 aircraft, purchased used from Altair Airlines in 1983.)	1970	

=== PSA training fleet ===
Pacific Southwest Airlines training aircraft fleet
Aircraft	Total	Introduced	Retired	Notes
Beechcraft Model 99	1	1972	1975	
Bell 47-G4A	1	Unknown	1969	
Brantly B-2	1	Unknown	Unknown	
Beech Bonanza F33-A	8	1967	1992	
Learjet 24	1	Unknown	Unknown	
NAMC YS-11A-200	1	1972	1974	Never painted in PSA livery
NAMC YS-11A-212	1	1974	1975	Never painted in PSA livery
Piper PA-23	16	Unknown	Unknown	
Piper PA-24 Comanche	5	1967	Unknown	
Piper PA-28R Cherokee Arrow	1	Unknown	Unknown	
