= Creature Comforts (disambiguation) =

Creature Comforts is a British stop-motion comedy franchise.

Creature Comforts may also refer to:

- Creature Comforts (album), a Black Dice album
- "Creature Comforts" (Star Wars: Young Jedi Adventures), a 2023 television episode
- Creature Comforts Brewing Co.
