= Dan Friedkin =

American businessman and film producer (born 1965)

- Born: Thomas Dan Friedkin; February 27, 1965 (age 61); San Diego, California, U.S.
- Education: Georgetown University; Rice University
- Occupations: Businessman, Film producer
- Title: Owner and CEO of Gulf States Toyota; CEO of The Friedkin Group; Owner and chairman of Everton F.C. Owner and president of AS Roma
- Spouse: Debra Lynn Friedkin
- Children: 4
- Parent: Thomas H. Friedkin

Thomas Dan Friedkin (born February 27, 1965) is an American businessman. He is the chairman and CEO of The Friedkin Group, a privately held consortium of businesses and investments in the automotive, luxury hospitality, sports and entertainment industries.

He is also the owner and chairman of Serie A club Roma and Premier League club Everton. As of January 2026, his estimated net worth is US$9.4 billion.

== Early life ==
Dan Friedkin was born in San Diego, California on February 27, 1965, the son of Thomas H. Friedkin, founder of Gulf States Toyota Distributors, and grandson of Kenny Friedkin, founder of Pacific Southwest Airlines. He earned a bachelor's degree from Georgetown University, and a master's from Rice University.

== Career ==
Friedkin established The Friedkin Group as a consortium of companies, including Gulf States Toyota (GST), across the automotive, hospitality, entertainment, and sports industries. He is also the owner and CEO of GST.

Since 2013, Friedkin has been chairman of Auberge Resorts, a portfolio of luxury resorts, hotels and vacation properties in the U.S., Mexico, Costa Rica, Europe, and the Caribbean.

In December 2019, Friedkin started negotiations to purchase the Italian football club AS Roma, and, on August 6, 2020, signed the preliminary contract to agree to pay $591 million to James Pallotta, the main shareholder of Roma.

In July 2024, Friedkin started negotiations to purchase English football club Everton. He agreed to buy the 94.1% share of the club owned by Farhad Moshiri in September 2024. On December 19, 2024, the deal was completed, and he became the majority owner of Everton at 99.5%.

In March 2025, it was reported that Friedkin met with the NHL regarding placing an expansion team in Houston and later met with the NHL Board of Governors in June 2026 to get the expansion team.

=== Film work ===
In 2017, Friedkin co-formed 30West, an independent film production, distribution company and sales agency. In 2018, Friedkin and 30West acquired majority ownership in Neon, a theatrical marketing and distribution company that distributed the Academy Award-winning film Parasite. In 2023, Friedkin successfully negotiated Neon’s purchase of Michael Mann’s Ferrari.

Friedkin is the co-founder and principal at Imperative Entertainment, a studio specializing in the development, production and financing of original and branded entertainment across all platforms focusing on film, television and documentaries.

Friedkin was a producer on over a dozen Imperative Entertainment films, including: The Square (Palme d'Or at the 2017 Cannes Film Festival), Killers of the Flower Moon (ten-time nominee at the 96th Academy Awards) All the Money in the World, The Mule, Hot Summer Nights, Arizona, The Last Vermeer, The Bay of Silence, Triangle of Sadness, and A Big Bold Beautiful Journey. He also executive produced the films Destroyer, The Mauritanian, The Contractor, Ben Is Back, The Crow and Wildcat as well as television series such as Treadstone, Landman and Black Bird. Friedkin was the director of the 2019 film The Last Vermeer.

Additionally, Friedkin won a Taurus Stunt Award for Best Specialty Stunt for his work in the film Dunkirk. Friedkin piloted an authentic Spitfire through an aerial dogfight, landing on the beach at Dunkirk, France.

== Personal life ==
He and his wife have four children. Friedkin has been described as “an avid outdoorsman and dedicated conservationist”, engaged both in Texas and internationally.

Friedkin is the founder and chairman of the Air Force Heritage Flight Foundation and is "one of ten civilian Heritage Flight pilots qualified to fly in formation with US. Air Force single-ship demonstration teams". Friedkin flies a variety of high-performance vintage military aircraft, performing in aerobatic air shows across North America and Europe with the U.S. Air Force and the Horsemen P-51 Flight Team. He actively collects and flies a warbird collection, including the T-6, P-51 Mustang, F-86 Sabre, Northrop F-5, F6F, F8F, F4U-4, Hawker Hurricane and various models of Spitfire. Friedkin has directed and coordinated over 1,000 hours of helicopter air‐to‐air, ground‐to‐air and in‐cockpit footage. He also owns and pilots Gulfstream aircraft.

An avid golfer, Friedkin built the Congaree golf course in South Carolina that was designed by Tom Fazio. Congaree is ranked No. 42 on Golf Digest's list of America's 100 Greatest Golf Courses. He is owner of Diamond Creek Golf Club in North Carolina which he purchased from Wayne Huizenga in 2012. Diamond Creek Golf Club is ranked as one of America's 100 Greatest Golf Courses by Golf Digest.

In August 2019, Friedkin was voted chair of Project Recover, a collaborative effort to enlist 21st century science and technology in a quest to find and repatriate Americans missing in action since World War II. He produced the documentary film To What Remains, which focuses on Project Recover’s recovery of over 80,000 American WWII MIA remains.

== Conservation ==
Friedkin is involved in conservation efforts through the Friedkin Conservation Fund, which works to protect millions of acres of endangered wildlife areas and stimulate community development in East Africa. FCF also conducts research and monitoring in order to make effective wildlife management decisions and promote long-term sustainability of wildlife and their wilderness. The family also leases 3.2 million acres of protected wildlife areas across Tanzania for conservation. Friedkin owns Mwiba Lodge, a luxury secluded lodge, located in a private wildlife reserve in the southern part of the Serengeti National Park in Tanzania.

He served on the Texas Parks and Wildlife Commission, which manages and conserves the natural and cultural resources of Texas, from 2005 to 2018, including serving as chairman from 2011 to 2013 and again from 2015 to 2018. Friedkin is currently the Chairman-Emeritus of the Texas Parks and Wildlife Commission. The Friedkin Group has been a supporter of the Texas Parks and Wildlife Foundation for over 20 years.

In 2014, Friedkin and Texas Parks and Wildlife Foundation, along with other conservation organizations, made the largest conservation investment in Texas history when they purchased the 17,351-acre Powderhorn Ranch to preserve one of the largest remaining tracts of unspoiled coastal prairie in Texas. Subsequent to Friedkin’s purchase, the ranch was being considered for a new wind farm project.

He was also instrumental in the success of the $100 million Keeping it Wild Campaign, originally launched in 2014.

Friedkin was among landowners and conservationists who supported a Texas legislative bill that would regulate the siting of wind and solar power projects in Texas. Environmentalists criticized the bill, saying it unfairly targets renewable energy and undermines climate change mitigation. Supporters of the bill stated that SB 624 was not meant to stop renewable projects but felt that “there are some areas of the state that should be off limits to turbines”. As Chairman Emeritus for Texas Parks and Wildlife, Friedkin’s support for such legislation was prompted after multiple renewable projects were planned in close proximity to Texas State Parks and natural areas; such examples included a proposed wind farm development adjacent to Pecos Canyon and Devil’s River, which would have negatively impacted migratory pathways of birds and monarch butterflies, and a NextEra Energy windfarm next to Palo Pinto Mountains State Park.

In 2023, Friedkin sought to prevent an electric transmission line being built on his sprawling ranch in West Texas. That same year, Friedkin was inducted into the Texas Conservation Hall of Fame.
