= Friedkin Airlines =

American charter airline

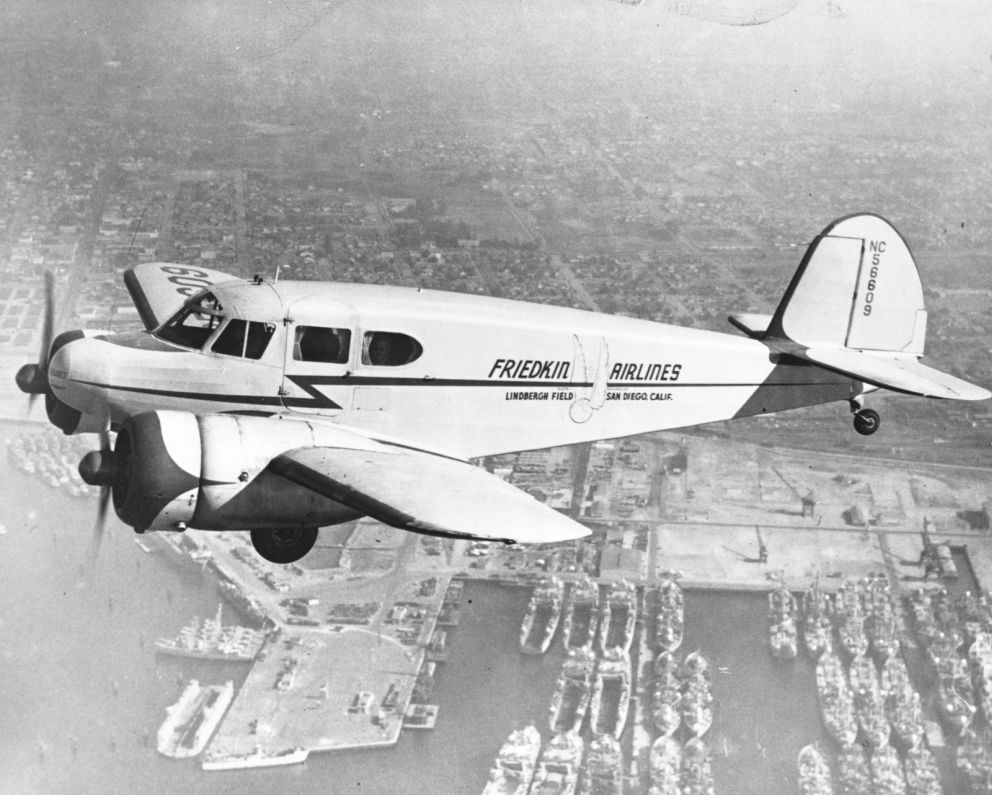
Friedkin Airlines

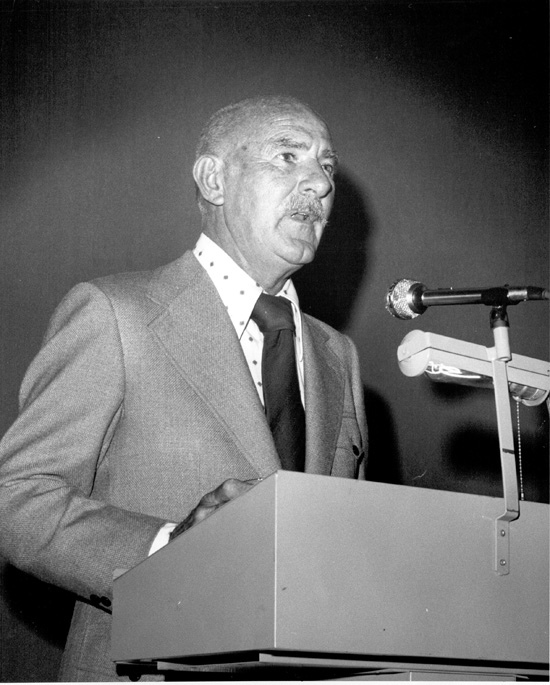
J. Floyd Andrews

Friedkin Airlines was an unsuccessful charter airline created by the businessman and aviator Kenneth Giles Friedkin. The airline flew between El Centro and San Diego, California.

== History ==
The first customer was flown by J. Floyd Andrews (who later became the president of the successor Pacific Southwest Airlines) to El Centro. As it was raining, the passenger was afraid to fly back to San Diego, and drove instead. On the drive back, the customer's car slipped off the road, and he was killed. Another passenger was a pregnant woman having a baby. The airline's failure led to the success of Pacific Southwest Airlines. This time, Friedkin obtained advice from a travel agent.

== See also ==
- List of defunct airlines of the United States
