= Thomas H. Friedkin =

American businessman (1935–2017)

Tom Friedkin
- Born: August 29, 1935; San Diego, California, U.S.
- Died: March 14, 2017 (aged 81); New York City, U.S.
- Occupations: Businessman, philanthropist, pilot
- Known for: Founder of Gulf States Toyota
- Spouse: Susan Friedkin (m. 1963)
- Children: 4 (including Dan Friedkin)
- Parent(s): Kenny Friedkin; Jean Friedkin

Thomas Hoyt Friedkin (August 29, 1935 – March 14, 2017) was an American billionaire businessman, airplane pilot, and stuntman who founded Gulf States Toyota Distributors.

== Early life ==
Thomas Friedkin was the son of Jean and Kenny Friedkin. His father was a combat pilot and trainer with the British Royal Air Force during World War II. After the war, his father opened Friedkin Aeronautics, a flight school in San Diego, California, before founding Pacific Southwest Airlines in 1949 with a single leased DC-3. In 1958, it carried nearly 300,000 passengers. Friedkin learned to fly while he was a youth and in 1962, started working as a pilot for PSA.

In 1962, Friedkin's father died abruptly of a cerebral hemorrhage at age 47. In 1963, PSA went public and soon after, his mother also died, making the younger Friedkin the largest shareholder of the airline. Although he had a seat on the Board of Directors, he continued working as a full-time pilot for the carrier. The airline continued operating until 1988, reaching $500 million in revenues, when US Airways purchased the carrier for $400 million. Friedkin received just $3.4 million.

== Career ==
During the 1960s, one of Friedkin's hobbies was racing cars. He was friends with Carroll Shelby, who had turned down an offer to become a distributor for Toyota Motors. Shelby introduced Friedkin to Toyota and Friedkin founded Gulf States Toyota Distributors (GST). Friedkin has built GST into a multibillion-dollar franchise that buys Toyota, Scion and Lexus cars wholesale and sells them—as well as parts and service—to about 150 dealerships in his franchise states of Arkansas, Louisiana, Mississippi, Oklahoma and Texas. GST's sales account for nearly 13% of Toyota sales in the United States. GST is a wholly owned subsidiary of the Friedkin Group and ranked 53rd on the Forbes 2008 list of America's Largest Private Companies with revenues estimated at $5.7 billion.

GST's corporate headquarters is in west Houston with a 400,000-square-foot (37,000 m^{2}) campus consisting of a five-story and a ten-story building, connected by a concourse and an eight floor parking garage. The complex includes a 40,000-square-foot (3,700 m^{2}) training center, in addition to Gulf States Marketing and Gulf States Financial Services offices. Gulf States Toyota Distributors is one of only two remaining private Toyota distributors in the United States, the rest having been reacquired by Toyota. The other is Southeast Toyota Distributors, founded by the late billionaire Jim Moran.

By 2001, Tom Friedkin, then 66, had turned over responsibility for running the holding firm and its 3,000 employees to son Dan, but remained chairman and was content to dispense advice. "I'm kind of a bum these days," he told Forbes. "I am not a greedy person, and I don't have to make the last dollar there ever was."

== Hobbies ==
=== Automobiles ===
Friedkin was a Grand National Owner from 1965 to 1969 and two of his drivers, Jim Paschal and Bobby Allison were moderately successful. He was friends with Bill Thomas of Bill Thomas Race Cars in Anaheim California and creator of the Bill Thomas Cheetah. Bill Thomas Race Cars built one of the first sprint cup cars for Friedkin enterprises in 1965 for driver Jim Paschal to race in the 1965 season. It was a 1965 Impala powered by a new secret 396 Chevrolet big block engine that was bored to 427 cubic inches. Friedkin's close friend Carroll Shelby, the Texan who was famous for designing the Shelby Cobra and the Shelby Mustang for Ford, would probably be a billionaire today if he had accepted Toyota's 1968 offer to become an automobile distributor. According to Shelby: "I turned it down because I went to Lee Iacocca, and he told me not to take it because the domestic makers were going to push the Japanese back into the ocean. In the end I was just 'dumb' for listening to him at all."

=== Power sports ===
For several years, Friedkin co-owned the Miss Budweiser with Bernie Little. The Hydroplane boat won American Power Boat Association Gold Cup Races in 1969, 1970, and 1973.

=== Airplanes ===
Friedkin also owned numerous warbirds, including a North American F-86F Sabre, a Chinese Air Force MiG-15, a Republic P-47D Thunderbolt and the General Motors version of a Grumman F4F Wildcat, among other planes. Many have been used in motion picture and television production. When asked to allow his F4U Corsair to be used in the television show Baa Baa Black Sheep, Friedkin insisted on piloting it himself; he has since flown in several films. Friedkin is a member of the Screen Actors Guild and the Motion Picture Pilots Association.

=== Hunting ===
Wildlife conservation and Big-game hunting were two additional passions of Friedkin. He created Tanzania Game Tracker Safaris in 1989. Profits from those expeditions help fund the Friedkin Conservation Fund, which works with the Tanzanian government to protect 3.2 million acres of wild Tanzania from poachers and illegal harvesting of natural resources.

== Philanthropy ==
The Friedkin Group, the owner of Gulf States Toyota, contributed $2 million in 2005 to establish the Friedkin Disaster Relief Fund to help provide relief to Hurricane Katrina victims who worked for Toyota and other dealerships. The Friedkin Foundation takes care of his philanthropic activities.

== Personal life ==
In 1961, Friedkin married Susan Wille Friedkin; and they had four children: Dan Friedkin (Debra), Tomisu Friedkin Dawley (James Raymond Dawley III), Dorothy Friedkin Tang, and Kenneth Friedkin (Mary). His son Dan is chairman of the family-owned holding company, Friedkin Group, which owns the auto distributorship Gulf States Toyota.

Friedkin died after a short illness on March 14, 2017.

== Film/TV credits ==
Friedkin served in several movies either on the crew working as a pilot or as an actor, including:

- Miscellaneous crew:
  - The Cat from Outer Space (1978) (pilot) (as Tom Friedkin)
  - Uncommon Valor (1983) (helicopter pilot)
  - Police Academy 4: Citizens on Patrol (1987) (pilot) (as Tom Friedkin)
  - Jaws: The Revenge (1987) (pilot) (as Thomas Friedkin)
- Actor:
  - The Gauntlet (1977) .... Helicopter Pilot #2 (as Tom Friedkin)
  - Blue Thunder (1983) .... Helicopter Pilot #4 (as Tom Friedkin)
  - Pale Rider (1985) .... Miner Tom (as Tom Friedkin)
  - The Rookie (1990) .... Pilot #2 (as Thomas Friedkin) (final film role)
- Stunts:
  - Heartbeeps (1981) (stunts) (as Tom Friedkin)
  - Mulholland Falls (1996) (stunt pilot) (as Thomas Friedkin)
- Thanks:
  - Firefox (1982) (special thanks) (as Tom Friedkin)
