= Coastal Empire Beer Co. =

American craft brewery

- Industry: Alcoholic beverage
- Founder: Kevin Haborak
- Headquarters: Savannah, GA, United States
- Products: Beer
- Website: www.coastalempirebeer.com

Coastal Empire Beer Co. is a craft brewery founded in 2010 by Kevin Haborak in Savannah, Georgia.

== History ==
The brewery is currently brewing out of their 79 Ross Road facility in Savannah, Georgia. Coastal Empire Beer won first place in the 2011 Savannah Craft Brew Fest People's Choice category for their Savannah Brown Ale.

Coastal Empire Beer Co. is Savannah's most award-winning production brewery, they have won 9 medals in international beer competitions.

== Beers ==
- Savannah Brown Ale
- Tybee Island Blonde
- Pale Ale
