= Gulf States Toyota Distributors =

American automobile distributor

Gulf States Toyota
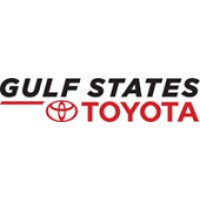
- Type: Private
- Industry: Automotive Distribution and Parts Distribution
- Founded: 1969
- Founder: Thomas H. Friedkin
- Headquarters: Houston, Texas, U.S.
- Key people: Dan Friedkin (Chairman & CEO); Jeff Parent (President & General Manager)
- Products: Cars, Trucks, Parts, Marketing, Training
- Revenue: $8.3 billion (2020)
- Number of employees: 2,000 (2015)
- Parent: The Friedkin Group
- Website: Gulf States Toyota

Gulf States Toyota, founded in 1969, is a private distributor of Toyota vehicles in the United States. They are franchised by Toyota Motor Sales, USA to sell vehicles to car dealerships in the five states of Arkansas, Louisiana, Mississippi, Oklahoma, and Texas. Corporate headquarters is located within the Houston Energy Corridor on a 400,000-square-foot (37,000 m^{2}) campus with a five and ten-story building beside an eight-story parking garage.

== History ==
During the 1960s, one of Thomas H. Friedkin's hobbies was racing cars. He was friends with Carroll Shelby, famous for designing the AC Cobra and the Shelby Mustang. Shelby had turned down an offer to become a distributor for Toyota because Lee Iacocca told Shelby that "the domestic makers were going to push the Japanese back into the ocean". Shelby introduced Friedkin to Toyota, and Friedkin entered into an agreement to distribute Toyota vehicles from the Port of Houston. Gulf States Toyota Distributors (GST) was founded in 1969.

== Operations ==
Gulf States Toyota is the smaller of just two private distributors of Toyota vehicles in the United States. The other is Southeast Toyota Distributors in Jacksonville, Florida, founded by the late Jim Moran.

=== New Rail Site ===
GST signed an economic development agreement with Temple, Texas in 2008 to construct a $50-million Inland Processing facility. The city is located between Houston and Dallas. GST was granted a 300-acre tract as an incentive to locate there. Construction was expected to begin in July 2009 and be completed by December 2011. However, the 2008 financial crisis and 2009–2011 Toyota vehicle recalls caused Gulf States and Temple to adopt an amendment to the agreement in 2010. GST was allowed to postpone construction for up to five years while compensating the city for infrastructure improvements already made: $4.6 million over three years. The project was never resumed.

Hurricane Harvey inflicted severe damage on the company's headquarters in August 2017, causing staff to relocate for several months while repairs were made.

=== Leadership ===
Toby Hynes served as president and general manager at GST from 1999 to 2012.
Martin "Marty" Collins, formerly a marketing executive for Ford Motor Company, was hired after Hynes retired. Ford filed a lawsuit in Detroit, claiming that Collins violated his employment contract by working for a competitor and sharing proprietary information. Collin's attorney responded that Collins was employed by the Friedkin Group, an investment company which owns GST. The suit was eventually dropped.
Collins quit abruptly in 2017 and was replaced by Jeff Parent, a Senior VP who remains in that position as of early 2022.

=== Vehicle processing center ===
Vehicle processing center in Houston includes an industrial spur with 7-sidings to offload vehicles from Rail cars. Vehicles are customized to order with options, such as window tinting and they're loaded to Car carrier trailers for transport to dealerships. All vehicles destined for Texas receive the required state inspection before leaving the center so that receiving dealers do not have to.

=== Parts ===
Gulf States Toyota built a 300,000-square-foot (28,000 m^{2}) Parts Distribution Center (PDC) near Sealy, Texas in 1986. The center was expanded by 40% in 2019 to 426,000-square-foot (39,600 m^{2}) in May, 2019. The expansion created a shipping dock on the north side of the facility to separate shipping and receiving operations. The warehouse handles 55,000 different parts/accessories.

== Community ==
Outreach efforts in the community include several programs.

=== Hurricane relief ===
After Hurricane Harvey in 2017, Toyota people from the US raised over $1.5 million for the Friedkin Disaster Relief Fund . GST parent Friedkin Group also donated $500,000 to the United Way of Greater Houston.

=== Stadiums ===
In September 2013, the soccer-specific stadium formerly known as Pizza Hut Park in Frisco, Texas was renamed Toyota Stadium. It is primarily used by Major League Soccer club FC Dallas (also sponsored by Gulf States Toyota) and Frisco Independent School District.

GST also purchased naming rights to Toyota Field in San Antonio, now the home of USL Championship club San Antonio FC, in 2013. GST also has the naming rights for Toyota Center in Houston, Texas where the Houston Rockets of the National Basketball Association play.
