= Creature Comforts Brewing Co. =

American craft brewery

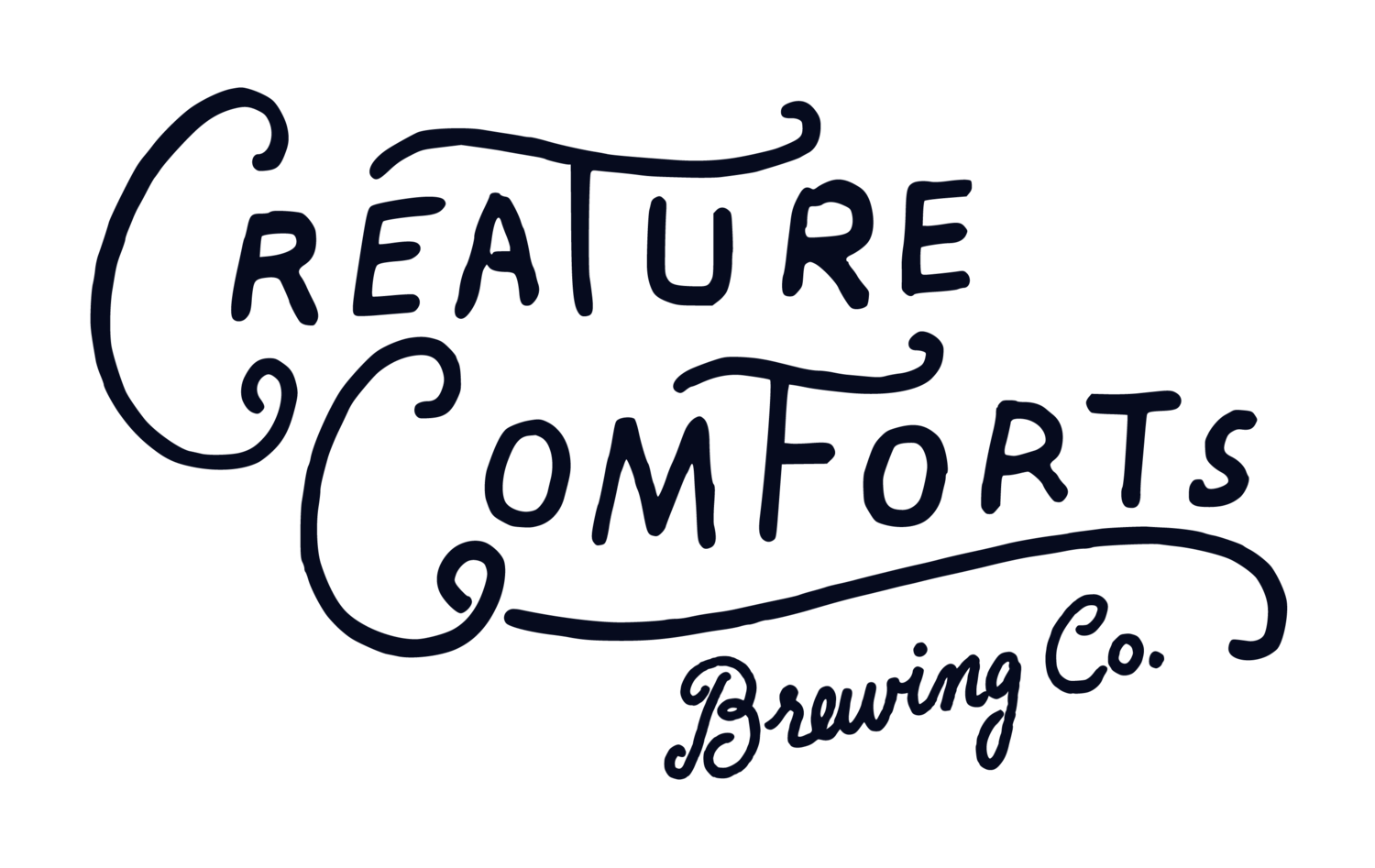

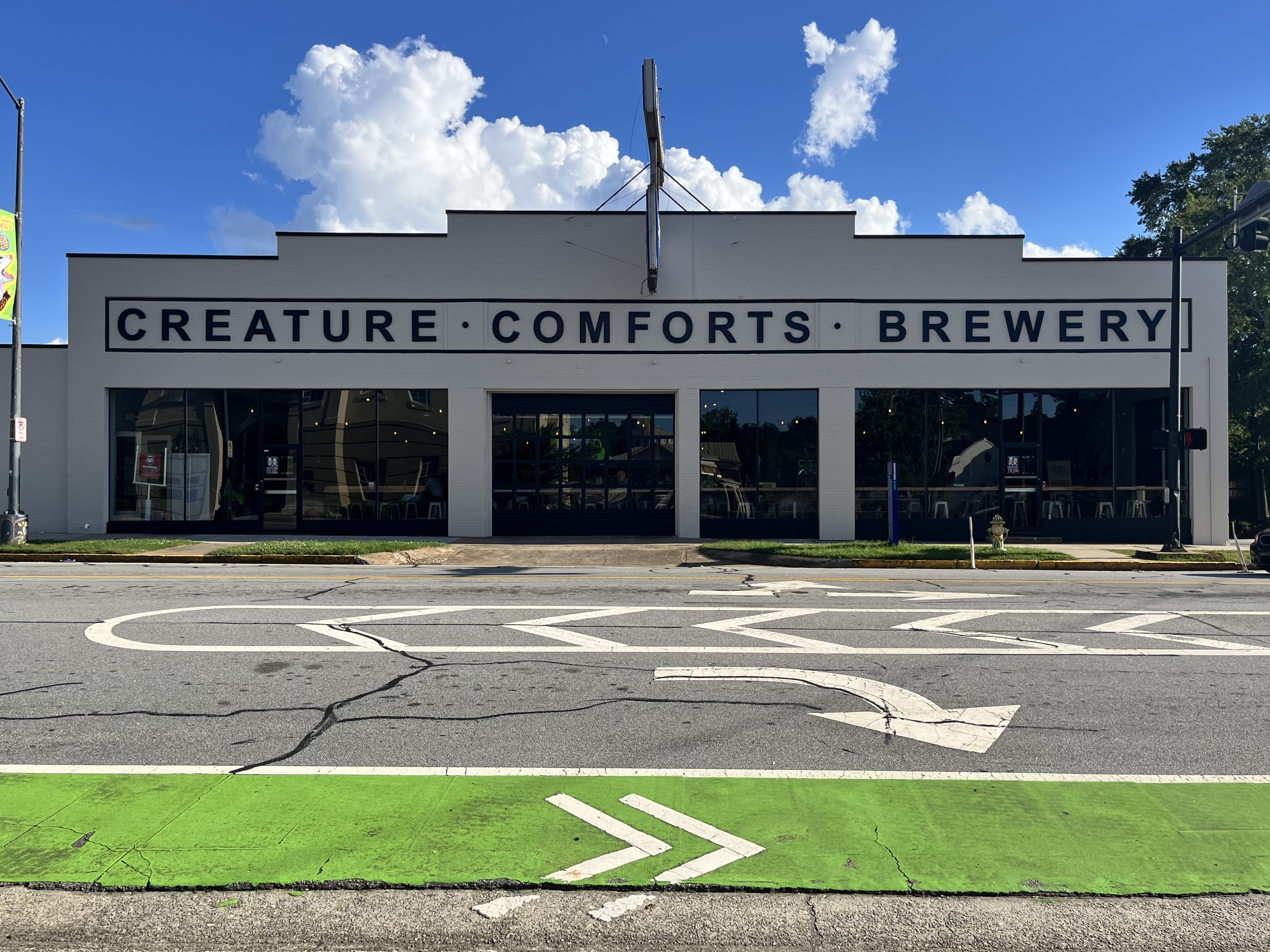
- Creature Comforts Brewing Co. in Athens, Georgia
- Interactive map of Creature Comforts Brewing Co.
- Location: 271 W Hancock Avenue, Athens, Georgia, United States
- Coordinates: 33°57′32″N 83°22′52″W
- Opened: April 2014
- Website: www.creaturecomfortsbeer.com

Creature Comforts Brewing Co. is an American craft brewery founded in April 2014 by David Stein, Adam Beauchamp, Katie Beauchamp, Derek Imes, Blake Tyers, and Chris Herron in Athens, Georgia. They have become popular for their core beer brands—most notably their Tropicália IPA—as well as a variety of seasonal and specialty releases.

== History ==
The brewery has a taproom located in a former Chevrolet dealership turned tire shop. The 13,000-foot warehouse is located in the city's downtown and is a central location for pedestrians. When the brewery moved in, an open floor plan was created and renovations were needed to the building. Memorabilia, including the large outdoor signage and another sign advertising Michelin tires, still remain. Keeping the integrity of the building's character while renovating it into a brewery earned the founders a preservation award from the Athens Heritage Foundation in 2014.

In 2018, Creature Comforts expanded their production into a second building in the Southern Mill historic complex. The additional location was an investment of $11 million. This 40,000-square-foot building is just north of downtown Athens and added 50,000 barrels to meet growing demand for their beer. The new facility and equipment is estimated to have doubled the brewery's ability to produce its popular Tropicalia IPA. In 2020, it was announced that Creature Comforts would expand into California by opening a taproom and production facility in Downtown Los Angeles. This was expected to open by summer of 2021.

The brewery has made several expansions throughout the southeast, including Tennessee and South Carolina. In 2021, they entered South Carolina Charleston, South Carolina and Hilton Head, South Carolina markets. The following year, the company announced its intentions to expand its distribution to Columbia, South Carolina. The brewery also announced plans to expand distribution to Greenville, South Carolina in the fall of 2022. In July 2022, the brewery expanded to Tennessee via Nashville.

== Culture ==
Beyond beer, Creature Comforts is involved in community outreach, most notably through its Get Comfortable program. Founded in 2014, the program provides grants to local organizations assisting those experiencing poverty or homelessness. In 2020, the initiative won the Champion Award from goBeyondProfit, a Georgia business leader alliance focused on community engagement, due to raising $351,841 for nine agencies located in the Athens community.

In June 2018, Creature Comforts launched their second community outreach program, Get Artistic. The program supports and invests in the professional development of artists in the Athens, Georgia, area.

In August 2021, Creature Comforts announced they had achieved a B Corporation certification, making them the 16th brewery in the United States to achieve the certification.

In 2023, employees at Creature Comforts announced the Brewing Union of Georgia and their intention to unionize.

== Beers ==
Year Round Beers
Brand	Style	ABV%
Tropicália	IPA	6.6
Classic City Lager	Lager	4.2
Athena	Berliner Weisse	4.5
Bibo	Pilsner	4.9
Automatic	Pale Ale	5.5
Cosmik Debris	DIPA	8.0
Tritonia	Gose	4.5

Seasonal Beers
Brand	Style	ABV%	Available
Koko Buni	Milk Porter	6.5	November - January
Imperial Trop Haze	DIPA	8.0	September - October
Duende	DIPA	8.0	January - February
Crescendo	IPA	7.2	July - August
Galactic Space Circus	IPA	6.6	March - April
Loopulus	DIPA	8.0	May - June
Stellar Drift	DIPA	8.0	November - December
Athena Paradiso (Cherry, Raspberry, & Cranberry)	Berliner Weisse	4.5	February - April
Athena Paradiso (Passion Fruit & Guava)	Berliner Weisse	4.5	May - July
Athena Paradiso (Pineapple & Lemon)	Berliner Weisse	4.5	August - September
Athena Paradiso (Blackberries & Black Currant)	Berliner Weisse	4.5	October - November

== In popular culture ==
Two of the brewery's beers, Athena and Tropicália, appear in the 2019 film, Avengers: Endgame. Joe Russo, one of the directors of that film, is a partner in the Los Angeles location.
