= Paradise Airlines =

Short-lived US intrastate airline (1962–1964)

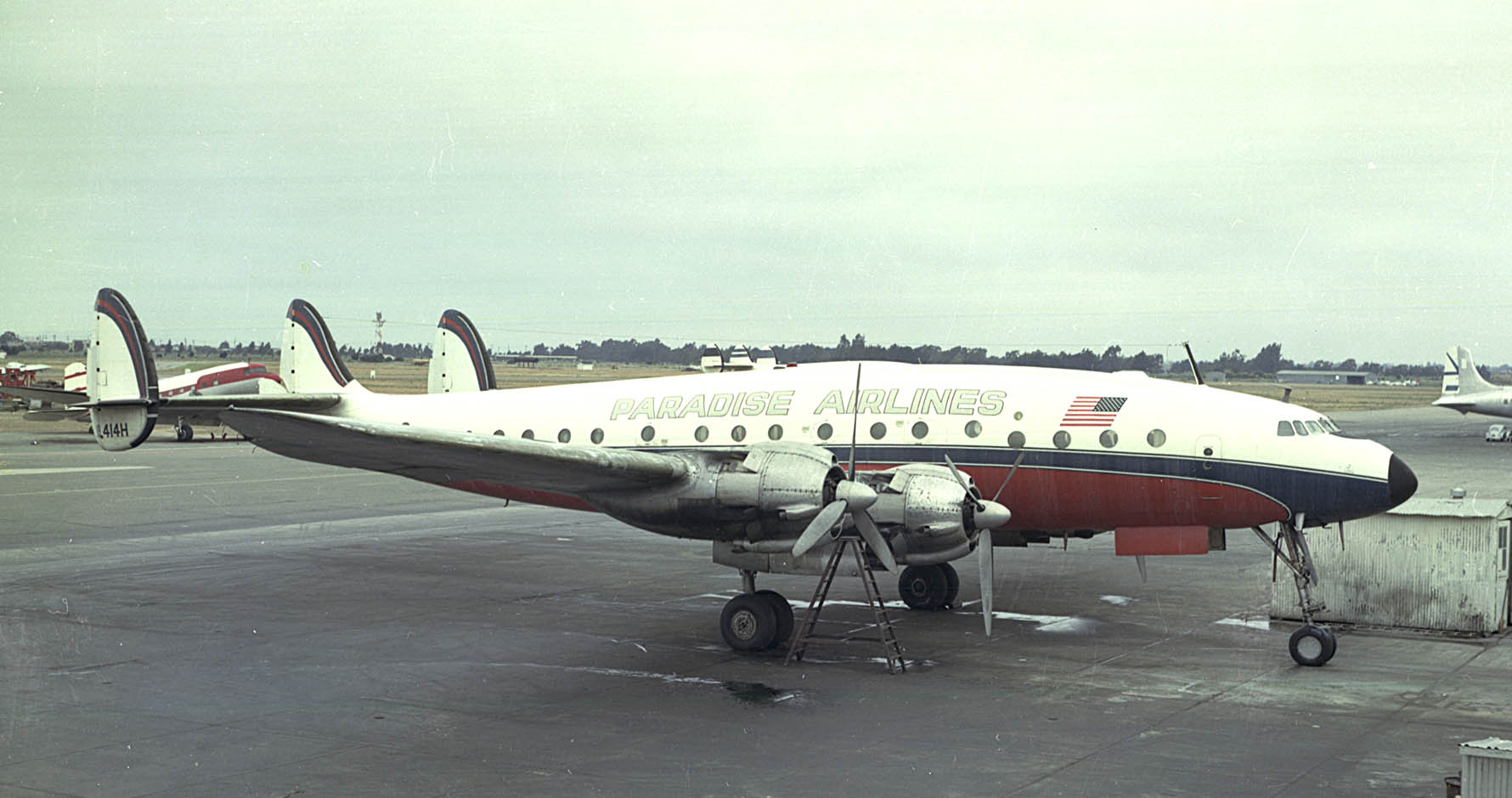
- Constellation at Oakland 1964, sister ship of the aircraft that crashed
- Founded: 27 June 1962 (incorporated in California)
- Commenced operations: 14 May 1962
- Ceased operations: 4 March 1964 (shut down by FAA)
- Operating bases: Oakland, California
- Fleet size: See Fleet below
- Destinations: See Destinations below
- Headquarters: Oakland, California
- Founders: Herman Jones; Henry Kengla

Paradise Airlines was a small California intrastate airline best remembered for a high-mortality 1 March 1964 crash of a Lockheed L-049 Constellation subsequent to a failed approach to South Lake Tahoe Airport in 1964, killing all 85 aboard. The crash helped induce a substantial 1965 change in California's economic regulation of its intrastate airlines. The carrier was shut down by the Federal Aviation Agency (FAA) on 4 March of that year.

== History ==
Paradise Airlines was an intrastate airline, a type of carrier that, by flying within a single state, sidestepped regulation by the Civil Aeronautics Board (CAB), the now-defunct Federal agency that, at the time, tightly controlled almost all commercial air transport in the United States. As an intrastate airline, the carrier was operationally certificated by the Federal Aviation Agency (predecessor to today's Federal Aviation Administration) while being economically regulated by the California Public Utilities Commission (CPUC). As a California intrastate carrier, Paradise was limited to offering service only between points in California.

The airline was incorporated 27 June 1962 by Herman Jones and Henry Kengla. Jones was president and Kengla was initially vice president of operations. However, the airline had been operating since 14 May 1962.

South Lake Tahoe Airport is located in California, close to the Nevada border, thus acting as a gateway to the casinos in Tahoe, Nevada. Paradise initially advertised its service in conjunction with Barney's Casino, Nevada. In 1963, Paradise flew over 59,000 passengers into South Lake Tahoe.

The airline initially flew a pair of 30-seat DC-3s, expanding in 1963 with a pair of 80-seat Lockheed L-049 Constellations, the first joining the fleet in March. In May, the airline was permitted to fly into Tahoe at night. Also in May, Paradise started Sacramento to Tahoe service. In June the airline started brief-lived service from Los Angeles International Airport to Tahoe, dropping it citing conflicts with a US Forest Service contract. In August 1963, Kengla stepped down from his position at Paradise.

== Crash ==
Paradise dispatched flight 901A from San Jose to Lake Tahoe on 1 March 1964 into weather that precluded the safe landing of the aircraft. The Constellation also had inadequate de-icing equipment to fly into icing conditions, inconsistent with the airlines own manuals. The pilot attempted to make a landing into poor weather, was unable to land and ascended to divert to Reno, which required flying over mountains. Unfortunately, the pilot became disoriented and crashed into mountains at about 8,700 ft, killing all 4 crew and 81 passengers on board.

Paradise resumed operations on 3 March, only for the FAA to issue an emergency suspension of its operating certificate, effective 4 March. The airline lost an appeal and by May had shut down its Oakland airport HQ.

== Legacy ==
The 1964 Paradise Airlines crash was a factor in passing 1965 legislation that changed the regulation of California intrastate airlines. Until 1965, the CPUC could only regulate intrastate airline ticket prices, it otherwise had no control over entry. From 1965 until the 1978 Airline Deregulation Act stripped California of such powers, the CPUC also had the right to regulate entry (and exit) from all intrastate routes, including the ability to prevent an intrastate carrier from operating at all. During the period 1965 to 1978, the CPUC certificated only two airlines flying large aircraft: Air California and Holiday Airlines, the latter of which was founded in 1965 by Henry Kengla originally to fly the same San Francisco Bay area to Tahoe routes that Paradise had flown. Holiday was thus, in some respect, a successor to Paradise.

== Fleet ==
As of 31 December 1962:

- 2 Douglas DC-3

As of 31 December 1963:

- 2 Douglas DC-3
- 2 Lockheed L-049 Constellation

== Destinations ==
From an October 1963 timetable:

- Oakland, California
- San Jose, California
- South Lake Tahoe, California

== See also ==
- List of defunct airlines of the United States
