= Holiday Airlines (US airline) =

California intrastate airline serving Tahoe (1965–1975)

IATA	ICAO	Call sign
HD	HOL	HOLIDAY
- Founded: 1965
- Commenced operations: 15 June 1965
- Ceased operations: 6 February 1975
- Focus cities: Lake Tahoe
- Fleet size: 3
- Headquarters: Oakland (1965–1970); Los Angeles (1970–1975)
- Key people: Henry Kengla; Harry A. Trueblood, Jr. John McCandish King

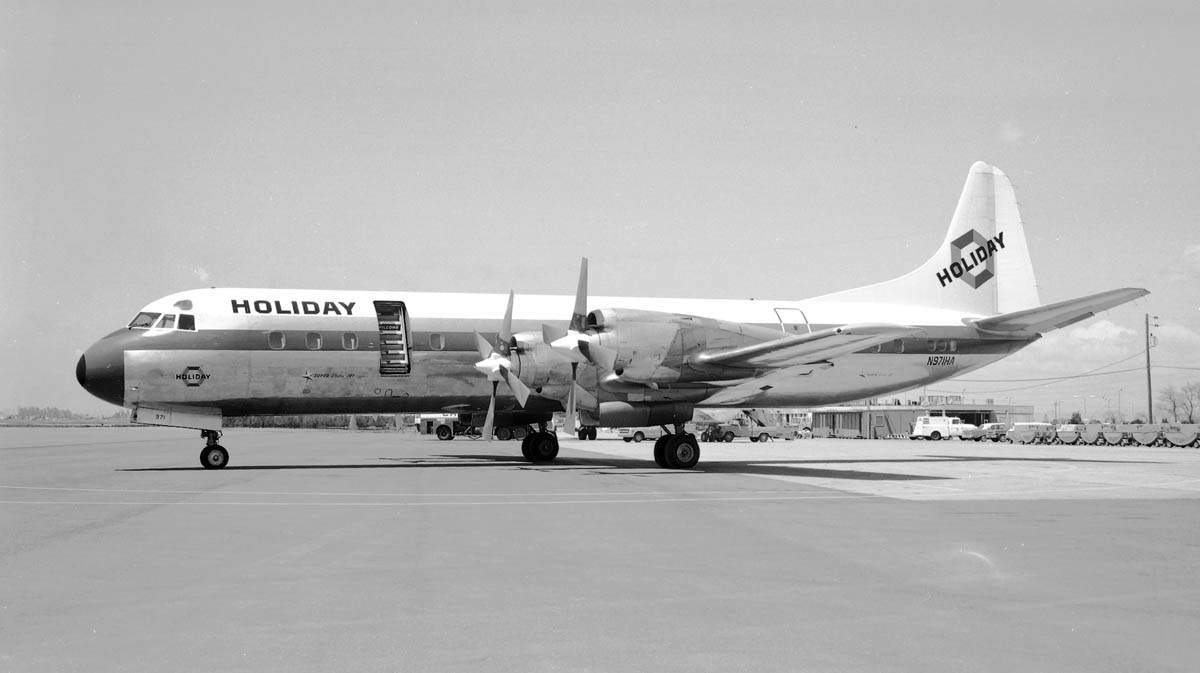
Holiday Airlines Lockheed L-188 Electra (N971HA)

Holiday Airlines was a California intrastate airline. Holiday operated scheduled passenger service with Lockheed Electra turboprops in California almost exclusively serving Lake Tahoe from Southern California and the San Francisco Bay Area during period 1965–1975. Holiday started roughly contemporaneously with Air California but the two airlines had different trajectories.

It is not to be confused with Holiday Airlines, a 1980s commuter air carrier in the northeast U.S. operating Beechcraft 1900 and de Havilland Canada DHC-6 Twin Otter aircraft under the JO IATA airline code.

== History ==
=== Startup thru Electras ===
Henry P. Kengla started flying a pair of de Havilland Dove aircraft from San Jose and Oakland on June 15, 1965 under the name "Holiday Airlines" as a sole proprietor for a fare of $11.95. Kengla was an original partner and former vice-president and director of operations for Paradise Airlines but resigned prior to the notorious accident which shut down Paradise in March 1964. His wife, also involved with Holiday, was the former head flight attendant for Paradise. Kengla started flying before the September 17, 1965 effective date of the California legislation that required approval by the California Public Utilities Commission (CPUC) to start an airline and thus, as a sole proprietor, was grandfathered. But he incorporated as Holiday Airlines, Inc. after the legislation and thus ran afoul of the CPUC, which said he had no right to transfer his grandfathered operating rights to another entity. After rapping Kengla on the knuckles, the CPUC granted the new corporation the requisite authority on December 6, 1966. Air California was certified three months earlier, but would first fly in January 1967.

On August 18, 1967, Holiday upgraded to a DC-3, retiring the Doves. In April 1968 it added a DC-6. After an extension to the Tahoe runway, Holiday added two Electras acquired from Pacific Southwest Airlines (PSA), including flights to Burbank. The first Electra went into service November 8, 1968, the second on March 7, 1969.

=== Public company ===
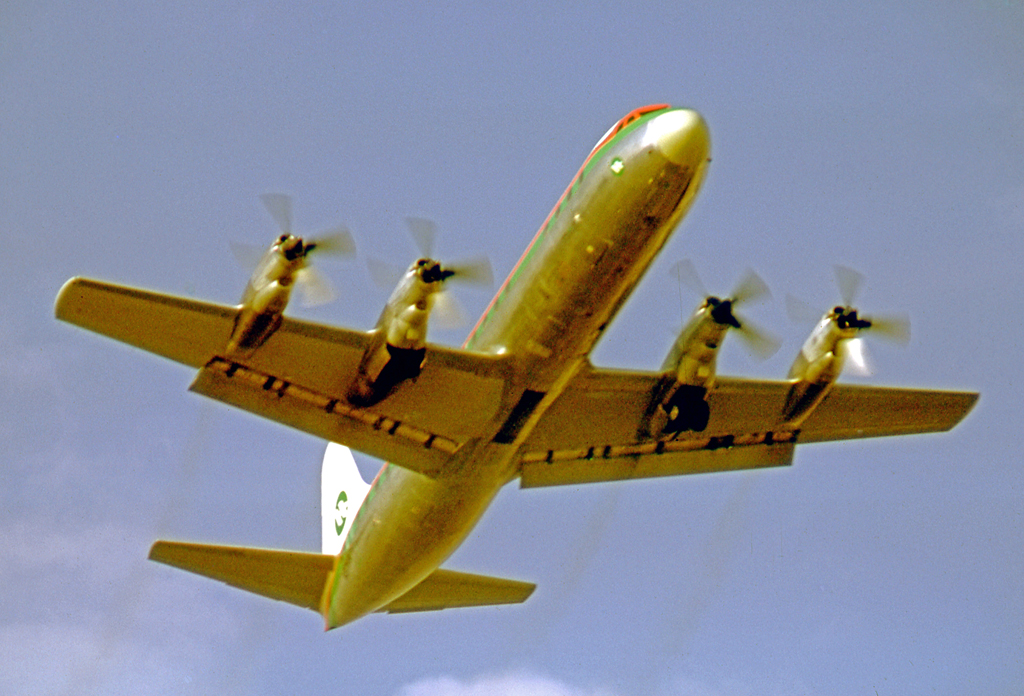
971HA taking off from Burbank in 1970

On October 28, 1969, Holiday completed an initial public offering (IPO) (400,000 shares at $7.50), making it a public company. A 1970 article by the Los Angeles Times based in part on the IPO prospectus, showed that the main shareholder was Harry A. Trueblood, Jr., a Denver oilman, and that another Denver figure, John McCandish King, had a significant influence, including leasing an aircraft to the airline through one of his companies. In 1973, Holiday Airlines, Inc. changed its name to Holiday Resources, Inc, with a new operating subsidiary created as Holiday Airlines Corporation.

Holiday ultimately also expanded to Los Angeles International Airport (LAX) (1971) and San Diego (1972). At LAX, Holiday used the so-called West Imperial Terminal, on the south side of the airport.

=== Non-economic ===
Holiday was non-economic. From its first fiscal year (ending October 31, 1966) through September 30, 1972, the airline lost a cumulative $4.16mm on cumulative revenues of $6.93mm. After 1970, financial institutions would not permit it to borrow. Holiday made a small profit in the summers, and then gave it back and more in the winters.

Holiday Airlines Financial Results, Financial Years 1966 thru 1972(1) Changed financial year end in 1970 from Oct 31 to Sep 30
	YE Oct 31				11moE Sep 30	YE Sep 30	
USD 000	1966	1967	1968	1969	1970(1)	1971	1972
Op revenue	124.9	89.6	127.1	1,238.1	2,179.0	1,453.0	1,721.3
Op expense	166.5	257.1	658.8	2,652.5	3,317.2	1,960.8	2,012.8
Op result	(41.6)	(167.6)	(531.7)	(1,414.4)	(1,138.2)	(507.8)	(291.4)
Non operating	(2.2)	(5.0)	(0.3)	(113.6)	29.2	22.0	(3.3)
Net loss	(43.8)	(172.6)	(532.0)	(1,528.0)	(1,109.0)	(485.9)	(294.8)
Op margin	-33%	-187%	-418%	-114%	-52%	-35%	-17%
Net margin	-35%	-193%	-419%	-123%	-51%	-33%	-17%

Holiday put itself in a box. It had Electras as early as 1968 and the proceeds of an IPO in 1970, yet until close to the end, Holiday applied only for routes that involved Tahoe. In stark contrast is Air California, which only started flying in 1967, also with two Electras; every single one of its routes was granted by the CPUC (PSA came into the CPUC era with grandfathered routes). From 1966 onward Air California and PSA competed at the CPUC for routes. Holiday never asked for anything outside of Tahoe. Particularly notable is that at the end of 1969, Air California won routes between Palm Springs and the Bay Area. Those would have been seasonally complementary to Holiday's Tahoe business, but Holiday was silent. Moreover, the CPUC explicitly saw itself as obligated to ensure the survival of carriers it regulated, so there was good reason to believe that it would have made some non-Tahoe awards to Holiday. But Holiday never asked and remained a subscale niche player.

=== Too little, too late, too bureaucratic ===
Towards the end, Holiday made ineffectual attempts to escape the trap, substantially hindered by bureaucracy. Holiday had multi-stop flights to/from Tahoe, but until 1973 the CPUC required all tickets on Holiday to either originate or terminate in Tahoe, so as not to disturb the intrastate carrier (generally PSA or Air California) that had the intermediate stages. Holiday wanted to sell intermediate stages so long as a flight started or ended in Tahoe. For example, on a flight from Tahoe to San Diego via LAX, Holiday wanted to sell the LAX to San Diego leg, even though that competed with PSA. In late 1973, the CPUC said that would be OK. Returning to that example, in April 1974, there were over 30 jet flights (ten of them PSA's) from LAX to San Diego, with equipment ranging in size from DC-9s to DC-10s. Holiday had two turboprop flights. In other words, this decision did little to improve Holiday's situation.

At the end of 1974, PSA and Air California applied to the CPUC for Tahoe, noting that they could do a much better job than Holiday, then the sole Tahoe provider. In response, Holiday finally asked for routes outside of Tahoe, but then withdrew, saying the CPUC process had become an overwhelming financial burden for a small airline. Holiday wasn't wrong. The 1973 CPUC decision referenced above was the result of a process that started over 10 months earlier with three days of public hearings in Tahoe, four days of public hearings in San Francisco, and briefs and supporting evidence submitted almost six months before the decision, and ended with the CPUC producing 15 pages of closely-written quasi-juridical reasoning, with findings of fact, findings of law, references to past cases and a formal order. Each of Holiday and five opposing airlines had consultants and/or lawyers, all listed in the decision (one of Holiday's consultants was Ed Beauvais, later the founder of America West Airlines). But that was just the start. In 1974, an appeal was granted (the CPUC produced a page of reasoning to justify an appeal of its own decision). This resulted in another process, lasting over six months, no hearings this time but more briefs and submissions, with the CPUC affirming (in January 1975) its prior decision with another 21 pages of reasoning. This was somewhat futile, because Holiday stopped flying a month later on February 6, 1975.

With no intrastate Tahoe service, the CPUC had to act quickly, giving emergency authorization to PSA and Air California to serve Tahoe, with the stipulation they use Electras. Between PSA and AirCal, passengers at South Lake Tahoe in the year ending June 1976 increased to 2.5 times the previous yearly high.

== Fleet ==
From 1969 onward Holiday Airlines generally had two Lockheed Electras, registrations N971HA and N974HA. The US Civil Aircraft registry for January 1975 (shortly before Holiday shut down) reflects a third Electra, N972HA.

Holiday Airlines Fleet January 1, 1975
Registration	Serial	Variant	Year	Owner
N971HA	188C-1091	L-188C	1959	Petroleum Investment Services
N972HA	188A-1114	L-188A	1960	Holiday Airlines Corporation
N974HA	188A-1001	L-188A	1957	Petroleum Investment Services

== Destinations ==
The airline served the following destinations in California during its existence:

- Burbank (BUR)
- Lake Tahoe (TVL) - focus destination
- Los Angeles (LAX)
- Oakland (OAK)
- San Diego (SAN)
- San Jose (SJC)

== See also ==
- Paradise Airlines
- List of defunct airlines of the United States
