= Louis Freeman =

Louis Freeman may refer to:

- Scottie Wilson (Louis Freeman, 1888–1972), Scottish outsider artist
- Louis Freeman (pilot) (born 1952), American commercial airline pilot

== See also ==
- Louis Friedman (disambiguation)
