= Intrastate =

Intrastate could refer to:

- Intrastate Interstate Highway
- Intrastate airline
