= Texas Aeronautics Commission =

Former agency of the State of Texas (1945-1989)

The Texas Aeronautics Commission (TAC) was a Texas government body established in 1945 by the Texas Aeronautics Act with a remit to promote and establish aviation within Texas, including assisting with the construction of airports and other aviation infrastructure. Amendments to the act in the 1960s increased the size of the commission from three to six commissioners and broadened its role to include, among other things, acquiring land for airports and the economic regulation of intrastate airlines operating within Texas. Activities of the Commission were published in an annual report. The TAC was reorganized out of existence in 1989.

== Role in the foundation of Southwest Airlines ==
The TAC played what might be its most prominent role in certifying and regulating Southwest Airlines as a Texas intrastate airline. For the first eight years of operation, Southwest flew solely within the state of Texas. In doing so, and taking certain other steps to minimize its participation in interstate commerce, it escaped then-tight Federal economic regulation. Without the alternative of TAC intrastate regulation, it is unlikely Southwest would have started at all, as Southwest was explicitly modeled on Pacific Southwest Airlines, a successful intrastate carrier operating within California. TAC oversight gave Southwest far more freedom to operate as it saw fit than did then Federal regulation.

TAC hearings for Southwest (then styled "Air Southwest") were held in 1967, and in February 1968, the TAC voted to grant the necessary certificate and give Southwest the economic right to fly between Dallas, Houston and San Antonio. There then followed two-to-three years of legal challenges to that decision, with Federally-regulated airlines flying within Texas determined to stop Southwest before it started. This included two successful appeals to the Texas Supreme Court on the part of Southwest and one unsuccessful appeal to the US Supreme Court by those determined to stop Southwest.

Under TAC economic oversight, Southwest successfully started operations in 1971 and expanded across Texas by 1978, from Harlingen in the south to El Paso in the west, growing from three aircraft to 13. By that time Southwest had come to dominate intra-Texas air travel, having dropped fares significantly and stimulated markets substantially.

Southwest's prominent success in Texas ultimately helped inspire the deregulation of the US airline industry starting in 1979. This would leave the TAC with no airlines to regulate, since under US deregulation, Federal economic airline regulation was effectively abolished. This meant there was no longer any advantage in being an intrastate carrier. Starting in 1979, Southwest converted its certificate from state to Federal and started the process of expanding outside of Texas.

== Demise ==
The remaining functions of the TAC were reorganized into the new Texas Aviation Department in 1989, which in turn was folded into the Texas Department of Transportation in 1991 as the Aviation Division.

== See also ==
- History of Southwest Airlines
