= Louis Friedman (disambiguation) =

Louis or Lewis Friedman or Freedman may refer to:

- Louis Friedman (born 1941), American astronautics engineer
- Louis L. Friedman (1906–1997), American lawyer and politician
- Louis Freedman (1917–1998), British businessman, racehorse owner and breeder
- Lewis Friedman, American screenwriter
- Lewis Freedman, producer of Benjamin Franklin, a 1974 American television miniseries

== See also ==
- Louis Freeman (disambiguation)
