= Tahoe Air =

Airline of the United States

IATA	ICAO	Call sign
XP	CXP	CASINO EXPRESS
- Founded: June 1999; 26 years ago
- Commenced operations: June 25, 1999; 26 years ago
- Ceased operations: October 1999; 26 years ago
- Hubs: South Lake Tahoe Airport
- Frequent-flyer program: Diamond Club
- Fleet size: 1
- Destinations: 3
- Parent company: Casino Express
- Headquarters: Elko, Nevada
- Website: Old web page

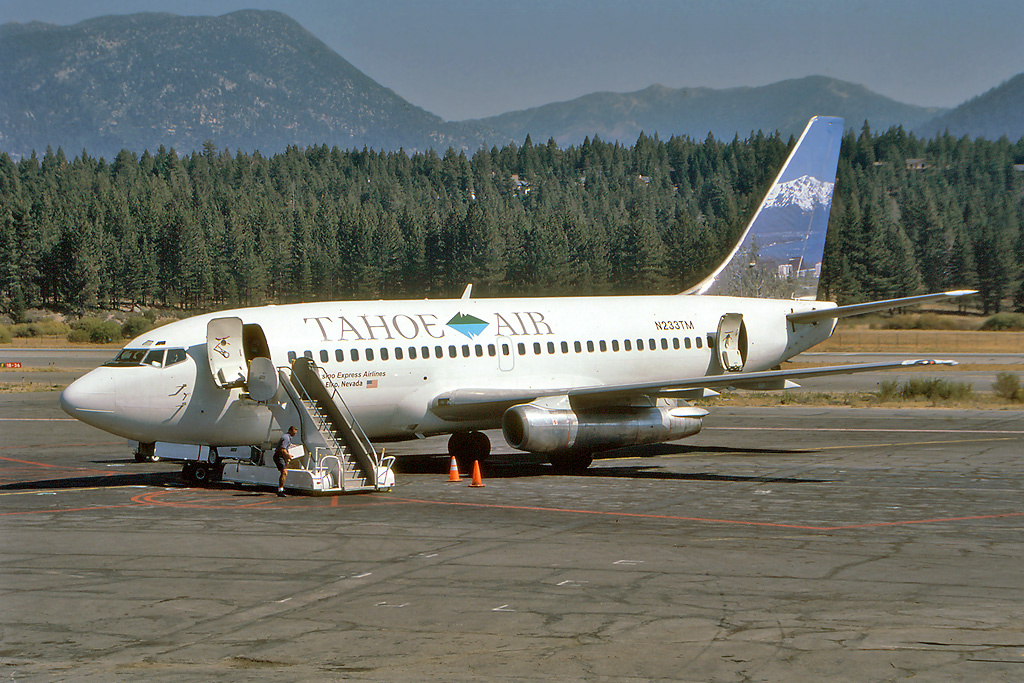
Tahoe Air's 737-200 at Lake Tahoe Airport in September 1999

Tahoe Air was a United States airline founded by Mark Sando, who used Casino Express Airlines to fund their plane purchase. Tahoe Air offered jet flights directly out of South Lake Tahoe via the South Lake Tahoe Airport using a Boeing 737-200.

== History ==
Scheduled passenger service was planned to be operated with McDonnell Douglas MD-80 jetliners; however, before any orders were placed, operations began with a single Boeing 737-200 jet, registered N233TM and operated by its parent company Casino Express. The lone aircraft was painted in the Tahoe Air livery. Tahoe Air made its first flight to Los Angeles (LAX) on June 25, 1999. On July 1, 1999, the airline started service to its second destination, San Jose, California (SJC).

The carrier offered low fares in a two class cabin with inexpensive upgrades. However, by October 1999, the airline had ceased operations, never having received any of its proposed MD-80 aircraft. The demise of Tahoe Air also marked the end of airline service to Lake Tahoe, which has not seen scheduled passenger air carrier flights since.

== Destinations ==
- South Lake Tahoe Airport (TVL) Hub
- San Jose International Airport (SJC)
- Los Angeles International Airport (LAX)

== Fleet ==
- 1 Boeing 737-200 (N233TM)

== See also ==
- List of defunct airlines of the United States
