= Cal Sierra Airlines =

US regional airline, San Diego 1980–1981

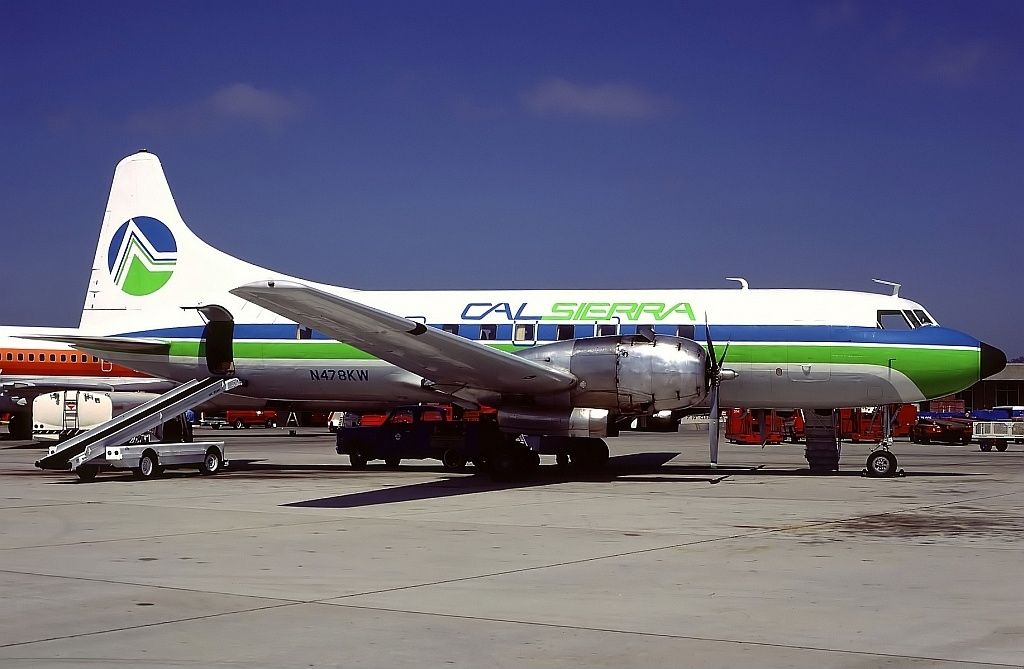
- One of two Convairs operated by Cal Sierra, reg. N478KW.
- Commenced operations: 1980; 46 years ago
- Ceased operations: 1981; 45 years ago
- Destinations: San Diego, California, South Lake Tahoe, California
- Headquarters: San Diego, California, United States
- Key people: E. D. Perry, Alan Goddard

Cal Sierra Airlines was a start-up commuter airline based in San Diego, California. The airline was founded by retired Pan Am Captain E. D. Perry and his business partner Alan Goddard.

== History ==
The airline started in December 1980 with a route between San Diego and South Lake Tahoe, California, operating Convair 440 aircraft, which were chosen partly to meet noise restrictions standards at Lake Tahoe Airport. The flights were stopped on Jan 21 1981, and resumed later in June when the FAA certified its only remaining operating aircraft.

A planned expansion was halted with the PATCO strike in the United States. Because of the shortage of air traffic controllers in the United States, airlines were not given the authority to add new routes. The new airline was short-lived without the chance to expand. It ceased operations after less than nine months of service in 1981.

== See also ==
- List of defunct airlines of the United States
