= Louis Freeman (pilot) =

American pilot (born 1952)

- Born: Louis Lawrence Freeman; June 12, 1952 (age 74); Austin, Texas, U.S.

Louis Freeman (born June 12, 1952, in Austin, Texas) is a commercial airline pilot. In 1980 Freeman became Southwest Airlines' first black pilot, and, in 1992 he became the first black chief pilot of a major United States airline. His last flight was June 8, 2017.

== Education ==
Freeman attended Woodrow Wilson High School in Dallas, Texas. In 1967 Freeman and his brother, along with 8 others, were the first African American students to integrate the school. They were also the first African American assistant drum majors for the Wilson High School. Freeman became the first African American cadet corps commander at the school's ROTC, prior to graduating in 1970.

Thereafter, he enrolled at the East Texas State University. Here, once again, he was the first African American ROTC cadet corps commander. Freeman first attempted the Air Force Officers' Qualifying Test (AFOQT) in his Freshman year at East Texas. Though he failed the pilot aptitude section of the test, he passed the AFOQT in his subsequent attempt, the following year. In 1974, he graduated with a bachelor's degree in sociology and psychology.

== Air Force Career ==
Freeman was the first African American trainee to attend the United States Air Force Undergraduate Pilot Training program at Reese Air Force Base outside of Lubbock, Texas. After completing his training, Freeman was assigned to the 454th Flying Training Squadron at Mather Air Force Base in California. While at the 454th he flew the T-43's, and was one of the first Lieutenants to become a flight instructor and supervisor of flying. He remained at the Mather Air Force Base until 1980, before resigning his commission and moving to commercial aviation.
