= Lake Tahoe Airport =

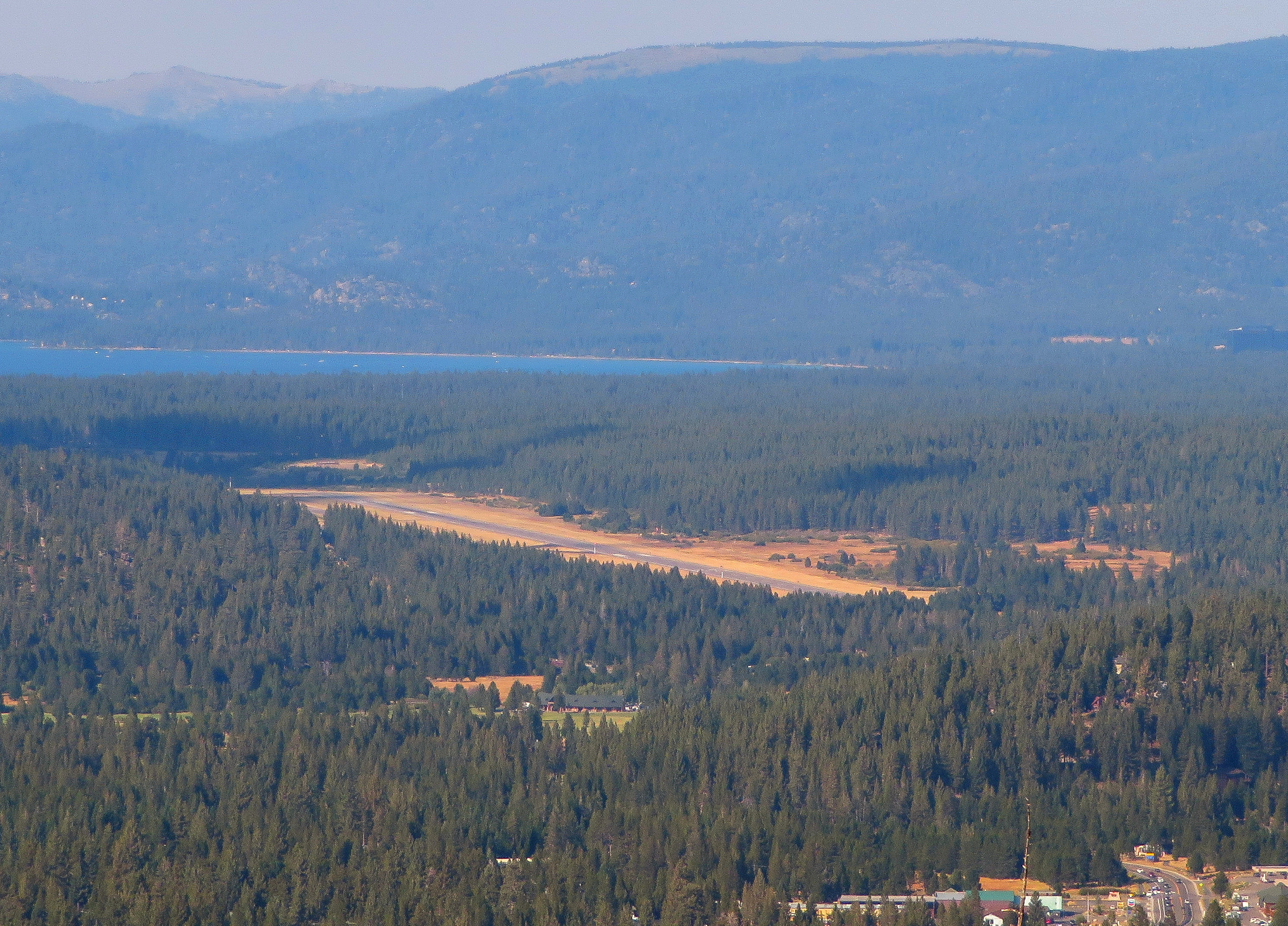
- IATA: TVL; ICAO: KTVL; FAA LID: TVL

Summary
- Airport type: Public
- Owner/Operator: City of South Lake Tahoe
- Location: South Lake Tahoe, California
- Elevation AMSL: 6,269 ft (1,911 m)
- Coordinates: 38°53′38″N 119°59′43″W
- Website: cityofslt.us/182/Airport
- Interactive map of Lake Tahoe Airport

Runways
Direction	Length		Surface
Direction	ft	m	Surface
18/36	8,541	2,603	Asphalt

Lake Tahoe Airport (IATA: TVL, ICAO: KTVL, FAA LID: TVL) is a public airport three miles southwest of South Lake Tahoe, in El Dorado County, California. It covers 348 acres (141 ha) and has one runway; it is sometimes called Tahoe Valley Airport. Although the airport had almost forty years of airline service, since 2000, it has served only general aviation.

== History ==
The airport in the Sierra Nevada mountains just south of Lake Tahoe opened in 1959 with a 5900-ft runway. Beginning in 1962 it had a few airline flights: the first were on Futura Airlines, an intrastate airline, and on Paradise Airlines, both flying Lockheed L-049 Constellations. In 1963, Paradise was operating three daily flights between Lake Tahoe and Oakland and San Jose in the Bay Area with some flights occasionally being operated with Douglas DC-3 aircraft instead of the Constellation. Paradise then ceased operations after a fatal accident in the mountains near Lake Tahoe.

Pacific Air Lines arrived in 1964 with Fairchild F-27 turboprops. That summer, Lake Tahoe was a stop on an F-27 "milk run" service: Pacific flight 771 operated Reno-Lake Tahoe-Sacramento-San Francisco-San Jose-Fresno-Bakersfield-Los Angeles-San Diego. In 1966, Pacific started the first jet service to Lake Tahoe, Boeing 727-100s flying Los Angeles (LAX)-San Jose-Lake Tahoe. A 1966 Pacific Air Lines route map depicted nonstop 727 service to San Francisco (SFO) and Reno. This 727 service lasted less than a year, and Lake Tahoe did not see scheduled jets again until 1983; scheduled airline jet flights were banned by the local government after Pacific ended its 727 flights. Pacific Air Lines and successors Air West and Hughes Airwest continued operating F-27 flights until 1973.

Holiday Airlines served Lake Tahoe with Lockheed L-188 Electras in the 1960s and early 1970s, followed by Pacific Southwest Airlines (PSA) and Air California (later AirCal) Electras starting in 1975. Sierra Pacific Airlines, a commuter air carrier, served the airport in the mid-1960s with flights to San Francisco, San Jose, Oakland and Monterey. Commuter air carrier Skymark Airlines, a predecessor of Golden West Airlines (which later served the airport as well), flew de Havilland Canada DHC-6 Twin Otters in the late 1960s nonstop to Sacramento and Fresno and direct to Oakland, San Jose and Monterey. Golden Pacific Airlines (1969-1973), a commuter air carrier, was operating nonstop to Lake Tahoe from San Francisco, Sacramento and Reno in 1969 with Beechcraft 99 turboprops. Valley Airlines, another commuter airline, was also serving the airport in 1969 with nonstop flights to Reno, San Francisco, San Jose and Stockton.

PSA dropped Lake Tahoe in 1979, as did Air California a few months later. The replacements were Aspen Airways and Cal Sierra Airlines, both flying Convair 580s, and Air Pacific (United States) and successor Golden Gate Airlines as well as Golden West Airlines with all three airlines operating de Havilland Canada DHC-7 Dash 7s. Pacific Coast Airlines (formerly Apollo Airways) served the airport with Handley Page Jetstreams while Gulf Air Transport, McCulloch International Airlines and Nomads air travel club nonscheduled gambling charters all used Electras. Other turboprop operators were Royal American Airways with the Vickers Viscount, Sierra Expressway with the BAe Jetstream 31 and Alpha Air operating as Trans World Express for TWA with the Beechcraft 1900C.

According to the Official Airline Guide, six regional and commuter airlines were serving Lake Tahoe in spring 1981 including Air Sierra, Aspen Airways, Cal Sierra Airlines, Golden Gate Airlines, Golden West Airlines and Great Sierra Airlines with a combined total of up to 24 flights a day. The April 1, 1981 OAG edition lists nonstop flights from Burbank, Fresno, Los Angeles, Oakland, Orange County, Reno, San Diego, San Francisco, San Jose and Truckee, CA.

Jet service resumed in 1983 with AirCal McDonnell Douglas MD-80s followed by Boeing 737-300s. AirCal flew nonstop to Los Angeles, San Francisco and San Jose, CA and direct to Burbank and Orange County. In 1987, a daily AirCal 737-300 flight was scheduled direct to Chicago O'Hare Airport via San Francisco and Orange County. American Airlines acquired AirCal in 1987 and continued to serve Lake Tahoe with the former AirCal 737-300s but soon switched its service to regional partner American Eagle which operated Saab 340s and Fairchild Swearingen Metroliners to the airport in the 1990s. American was the only major airline to serve Lake Tahoe. In late 1989, American and code sharing affiliate American Eagle were the only airlines at Lake Tahoe, American with Boeing 737-200s and American Eagle with Metro IIIs. At one point, Reno Air flew McDonnell Douglas MD-80s and MD-87s nonstop to Los Angeles; other jets included BAC One-Elevens and Convair 990s on nonscheduled casino charters. The four engine Convair 990 jet operated by Ports of Call Travel Club could land at the airport but could not depart from Lake Tahoe with a full load of passengers, so departing passengers were bused to the Reno airport and boarded the 990 there.

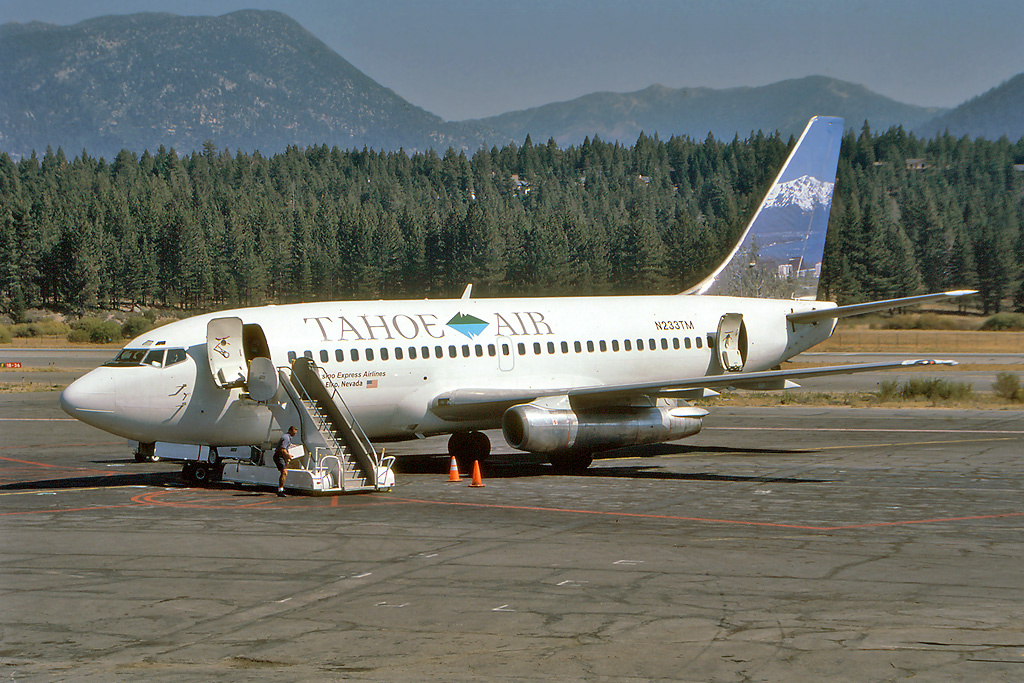
A Tahoe Air Boeing 737-200 at Lake Tahoe Airport in 1999.

In 1999, Casino Express Airlines operating as Tahoe Air started low fare Boeing 737-200 service nonstop to San Jose and Los Angeles (LAX). Allegiant Air flew McDonnell Douglas DC-9 nonstops to Burbank, Fresno, Las Vegas and Long Beach in 1999–2000. Tahoe Air ceased operations later in 1999 while Allegiant ended all service in 2000 and later became a low fare air carrier that is still in business. Lake Tahoe has not had scheduled passenger flights since, and the area is now served by Reno-Tahoe International Airport and Sacramento International Airport.

Due to budget cuts in 2001, the FAA ceased funding on-site weather observers who had also served as the airport's air traffic controllers. Unable to find replacement funding, the South Lake Tahoe city council voted to close the airport's Air Traffic Control Tower on October 1, 2004. Despite the tower's closure, the airport continues to serve general aviation traffic using self-announce procedures for uncontrolled airports.

Beginning in 2006, the airport's former commercial airline terminal building was renovated and converted into a new city hall and administrative services office for the City of South Lake Tahoe. Relocating to airport land allowed the city to counter rising lease costs at its old location in the Al Tahoe neighborhood. Renovations were completed and the new city hall opened in 2007.

== Facilities ==
Fixed-base operator services (e.g. fuel and ground support) are provided by Mountain West Aviation.

Attached to the former airline terminal building, the Flight Deck Sports Bar & Grill provides a public restaurant overlooking the airport's runway.
