= Intrastate airline =

Pre-1979 US airline that minimized participation in interstate commerce

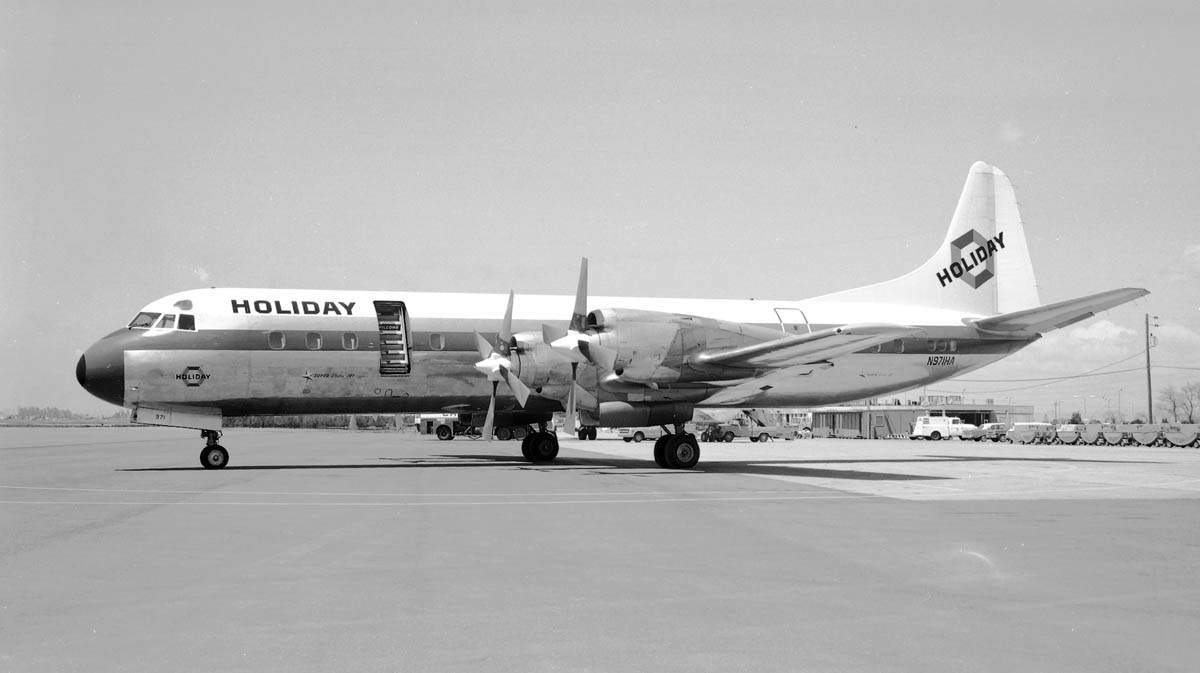
Holiday Airlines was a California intrastate airline from 1965 to 1975

Intrastate airlines in the United States were air carriers operating solely within a single US state and taking other steps to minimize participation in interstate commerce, thus enabling them to escape tight federal economic airline regulation prior to US airline deregulation in 1979. These intrastate carriers therefore amounted to a small unregulated, or less regulated, sector within what was otherwise then a tightly regulated industry. As detailed below, flying within the geographic boundaries of a single state was a necessary but not sufficient condition to qualify as an intrastate carrier.

Despite providing a small proportion of US airline capacity, the success of these airlines, in particular Pacific Southwest Airlines (PSA), and Southwest Airlines, played a major role in the advent of US airline deregulation and thus airline deregulation globally, and the subsequent growth of low cost and ultra-low cost carriers. Further, US airline deregulation was merely the first in a wave of general economic deregulation by the federal government, eventually extending to railroads, trucking, energy, communications and finance.

== Significance ==
In aggregate, US intrastate carriers never comprised a large portion of the US airline industry. At year-end 1978 (the end of the regulated era), the fleets of PSA, Air California and Southwest numbered 34, 13 and 13 aircraft respectively against a total of 2,263 aircraft in US air carrier fleets. A 1976 report for the US Department of Transportation said such airlines accounted for less than 2% of all US airline revenue-passenger miles. Nonetheless, these carriers had an outsized impact because of their prominent success. Despite being much smaller than the federally-regulated carriers, PSA and Air California came to dominate intra-California air travel, and Southwest the same in Texas. Moreover, the fares of such carriers were notably lower than federally regulated fares, leading to substantial increases in passenger traffic on the routes on which they competed, despite which the financial results of these carriers were far superior.

The contrast was stark. The success of these small carriers stood out among a US economy that, in the 1970s, was generally stagnant. They therefore helped inspire the 1979 deregulation of the US airline industry. While PSA and Air California had minor impact thereafter, choosing to become effectively traditional carriers and being swept up in the first decade of post-deregulation consolidation, Southwest stuck to its business model and became the most consistently successful airline in the United States, in turn inspiring many copycats worldwide. The advent of airline deregulation globally, and in particular such carriers as Ryanair and EasyJet in Europe and IndiGo and Air Asia in Asia, can therefore be traced back, in significant part, to these intrastate pioneers.

== History ==
=== Legal basis ===
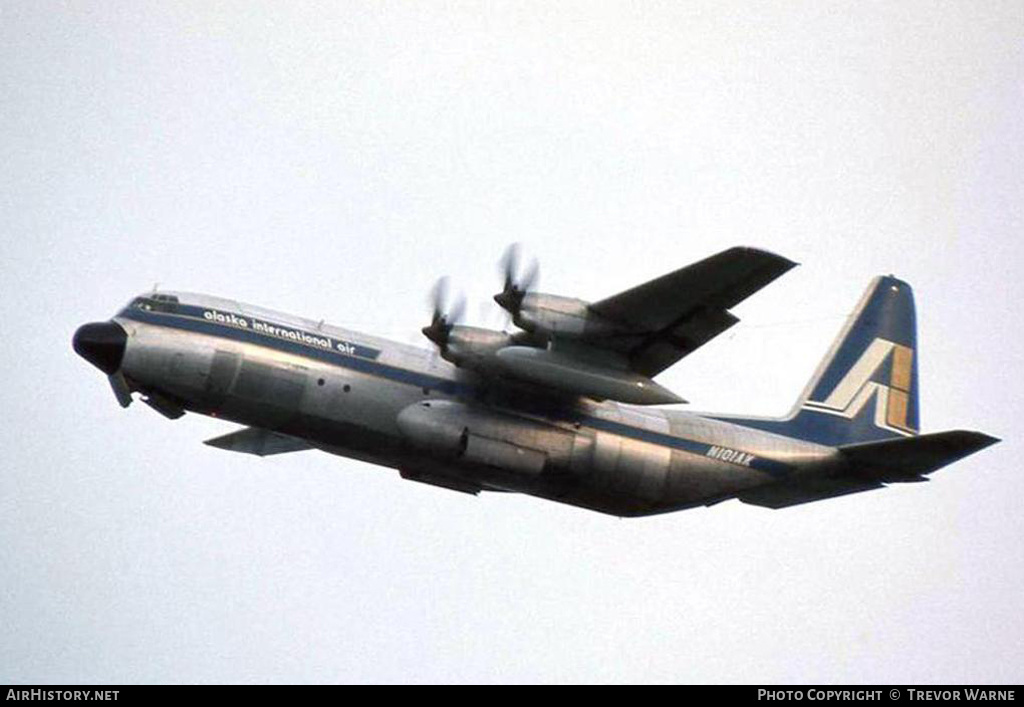
Alaska International Air was an intrastate airline that after deregulation operated 1984–1995 as the jet carrier MarkAir

The opportunity for intrastate carriers to escape federal economic regulation arose because of the Commerce Clause of the Constitution of the United States, under which the US federal government may only regulate interstate commerce, leaving states considerable leeway to regulate companies that operate solely within a single state, so long as that operation has minimal interstate impact.

Prior to PSA's launch in 1949, it was not obvious that such a niche existed for airlines - PSA had to assert the Commerce Clause against the US Civil Aeronautics Board (CAB), the federal agency responsible for economic airline regulation, and the CAB's requirement that PSA's service not have a material impact on interstate commerce required, among other things, that PSA not sell joint tickets to/from out-of-state cities and that PSA not sell tickets on its routes to anyone located outside California. It also meant that when the CAB allowed interstate carriers competing on such routes (e.g. United Airlines and Western Airlines) to match the lower fares of PSA, such fare matching applied only to tickets sold within the state of California - on purchases of tickets outside of California on United on a route within California that competed with PSA, normal (higher) CAB fares applied.

The CAB took the requirement for minimal impact on interstate commerce extremely seriously. As an example, in the dying days of the regulated era, the CAB was still engaged in a fight with PSA and Air California over the service of these carriers to Lake Tahoe Airport. This airport is located in California, right next to Nevada, and clearly many travelers used such flights to travel between California and Nevada. In the eyes of the CAB, this constituted a more-than-incidental impact on interstate commerce, which therefore meant such service should be regulated by the CAB, notwithstanding that the route itself was between two California points.

==== Geography vs law ====
Hawaiian Airlines and Aloha Airlines are examples of airlines that, prior to 1979, operated solely within a single state yet for several reasons remained regulated by the CAB. First, the carriers did participate in interstate commerce by, for instance, selling connecting tickets to the rest of the United States. Moreover, at times in their history the two carriers were directly subsidized by the CAB, including participating in CAB aircraft finance programs.

Further, when the State of Hawaii attempted to certificate an intrastate carrier, Island Airlines, the CAB challenged it on the basis that the channels between the Hawaiian islands were under CAB jurisdiction and therefore no airline could fly from one Hawaiian island to another without engaging in interstate commerce. This was upheld in court. So intrastate Hawaiian carriers were limited to flying within the boundaries of each individual island.

For similar reasons, California intrastate airlines could not fly too far offshore. In 1967, the CAB provided Pacific Southwest Airlines with a specific exemption to allow it to fly between Los Angeles and San Francisco more than three miles offshore. Federal Aviation Administration asked PSA to request CAB permission to use such a routing in the name of safety. The "high seas" were otherwise reserved for CAB certificated carriers.

Geographical intrastate operation alone did not imply legal intrastate status.

=== Role of state regulators ===
Prior to 1979, airlines with such status were economically regulated, if at all, by their home state. For example, prior to 1965, the California Public Utilities Commission (CPUC) regulated ticket prices for California intrastate carriers like PSA and Air California under pre-existing legislation pertaining to intrastate transportation generally. Only in that year did legislation increase the CPUC's authority to airline certification, market entry/exit and service quality. Southwest Airlines was certified by the Texas Aeronautics Commission (TAC). Air Florida was overseen by the Florida Public Service Commission.

By 1976, 25 US states regulated intrastate carriers within their borders. Of the 25 requiring certification for intrastate airlines, 15 regulated flight schedules, 17 regulated quality of service, 19 regulated market entry/exit and 19 regulated prices. However, other than in a handful of states, intrastate carriers tended to be tiny, a reflection of the fact that the economic opportunity was limited except in larger states. But such state regulation tended to be lighter than that exerted by the CAB. Moreover, state regulators had an interest in seeing "their" airlines succeed. The CPUC allocated non-overlapping routes between Air California and PSA, ensuring the survival of Air California (a new entrant in 1967) against interstate airlines competing on Air California routes. In Texas, enabling legislation specified that the TAC was to encourage and develop intrastate air service. Lamar Muse, Southwest's first CEO, saw the TAC as "anxious to have a real airline ... under the TAC's jurisdiction." In Florida, the Public Service Commission likewise sought to increase service by intrastate carriers.

=== Inability to swap state for federal (CAB) certificate ===
During the regulated era, certification of new domestic scheduled passenger carriers by the CAB was extremely rare. From 1950 until 1974, there was only one certification (Air New England). Only in the last year of regulation (1978) did the CAB relax and award economic certificates. Until deregulation it was impossible for an intrastate airline to swap its state certificate for a CAB certificate. Therefore, while intrastate carriers were one of the few ways to start a scheduled carrier, there was a natural limit bounded by the geography/demography/economics of the state they were certified within. PSA became superdominant within California, hitting a market share of 70% of passengers flying within California, but until deregulation had no ability to go beyond California.

=== Airline deregulation and the effective end of intrastate airlines ===
The 1978 Airline Deregulation Act effectively abolished federal economic regulation of domestic air travel in the United States starting in 1979 (the CAB was dissolved in 1985 under the same legislation). Further, it protected federally certified air carriers from attempted state economic regulation. Federal, not state, certification now provided the most economic freedom for intrastate airlines, which left state regulatory bodies with no airlines to regulate.

For safety purposes, intrastate carriers were regulated, as with any other US carrier, by the Federal Aviation Administration (FAA). This too is a consequence of the Commerce Clause - one aircraft is the same as any other in matters such as air navigation, and it would make no sense for both state and federal agencies to both provide services like air traffic control. Courts have long viewed safety as a federal responsibility.

== Prominent intrastate airlines ==
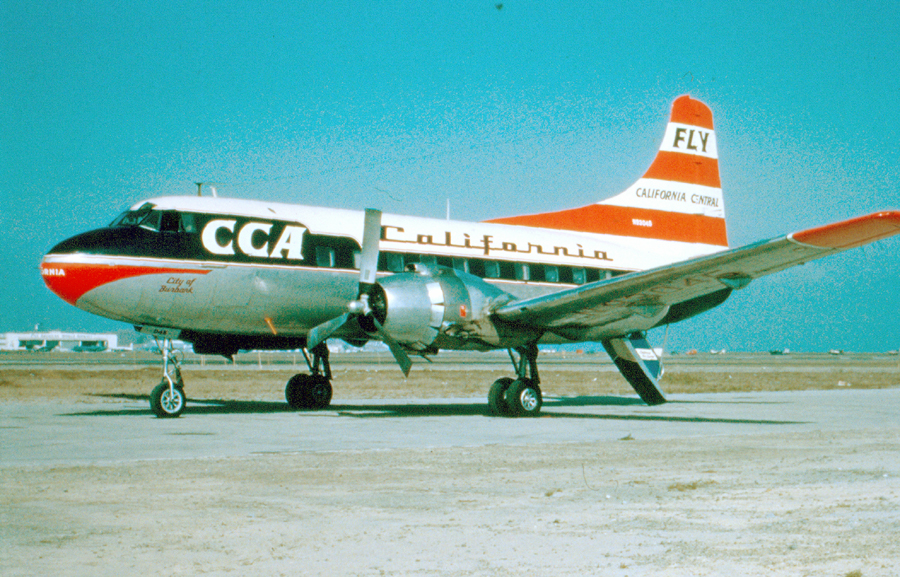
California Central Martin 2-0-2

=== Forerunner ===
The first intrastate carrier to make a substantial impact was California Central Airlines (CCA) from 1949 to 1955. CCA slightly preceded PSA (which started later in 1949) and during its existence flew many more passengers than PSA. CCA was credited to moving most transport between Los Angeles and San Francisco from ground to air, which was noticed nationally.

=== Four successful intrastate jet airlines ===
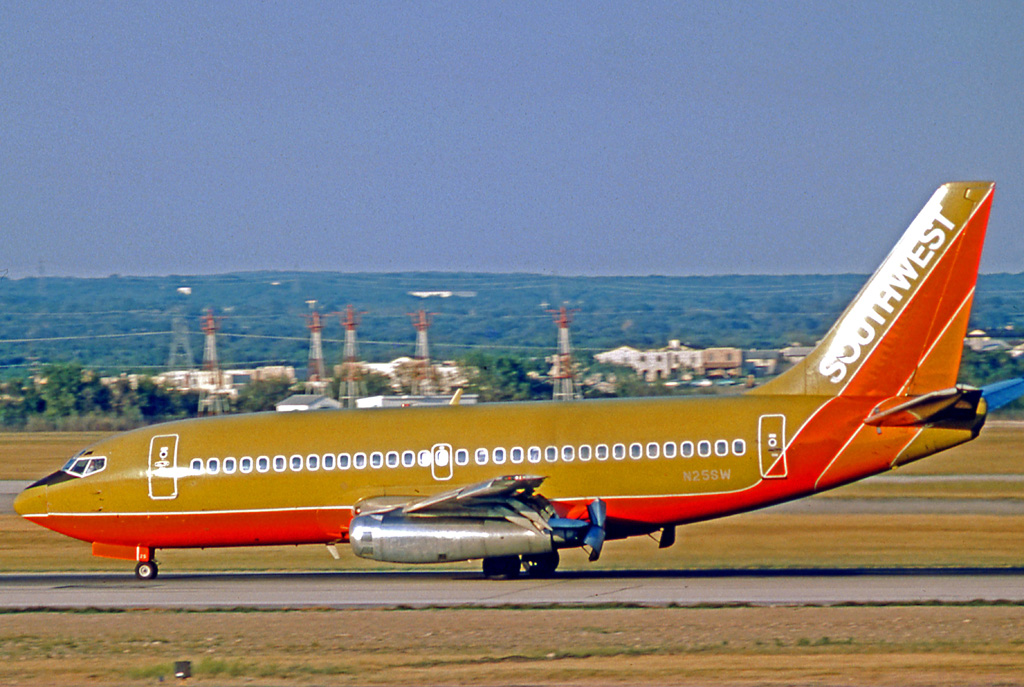
Southwest 737-200

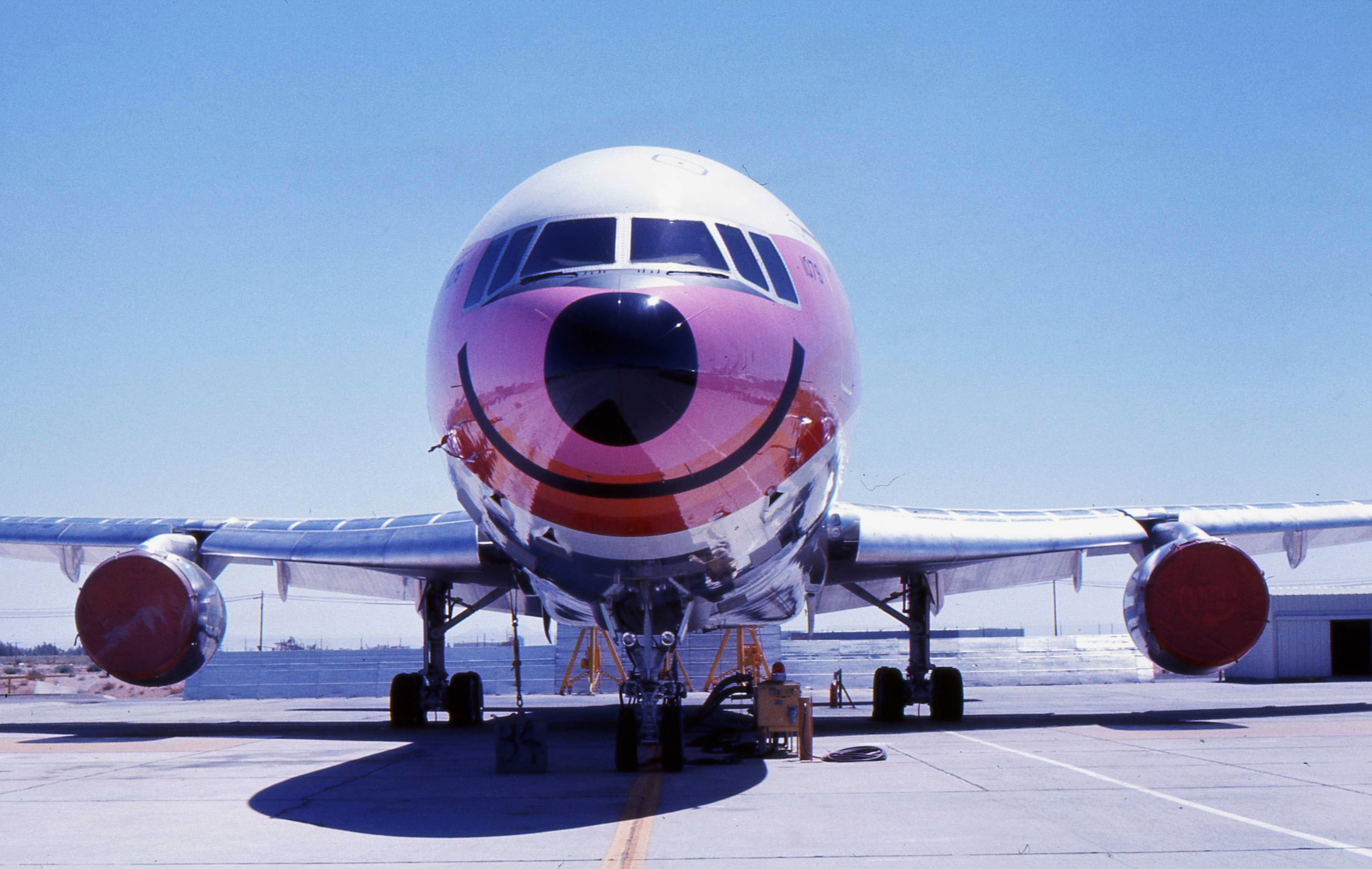
PSA Lockheed L-1011

Intrastate carrier success required a state that was physically large and had a substantial population. Unsurprisingly, the four intrastate airlines that acquired jet equipment were from California (PSA and Air California), Texas (Southwest Airlines) and Florida (Air Florida). Air California first flew in 1967, Southwest in 1971 and Air Florida in 1972. In 1970, the populations of California, Texas and Florida were 20.0mm, 11.2mm and 6.8mm respectively.

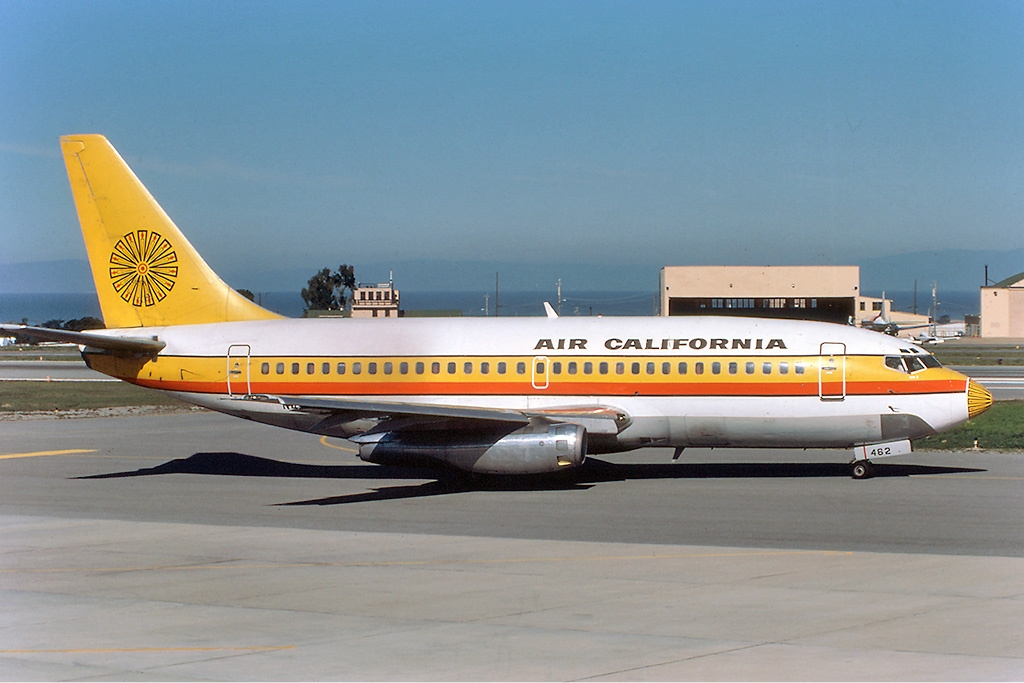
Air California 737-200

The highest profile intrastate carrier was PSA, the acknowledged inspiration for the other three. PSA became super dominant within California, with a market share as high as 70% and playing a substantial role in the life of the state. However, in the late 1960s and early 1970s it became distracted by ill-conceived diversification into hotels, rental cars and radio stations, and made a very poor decision to buy wide-bodied aircraft, leading to significant financial distress.

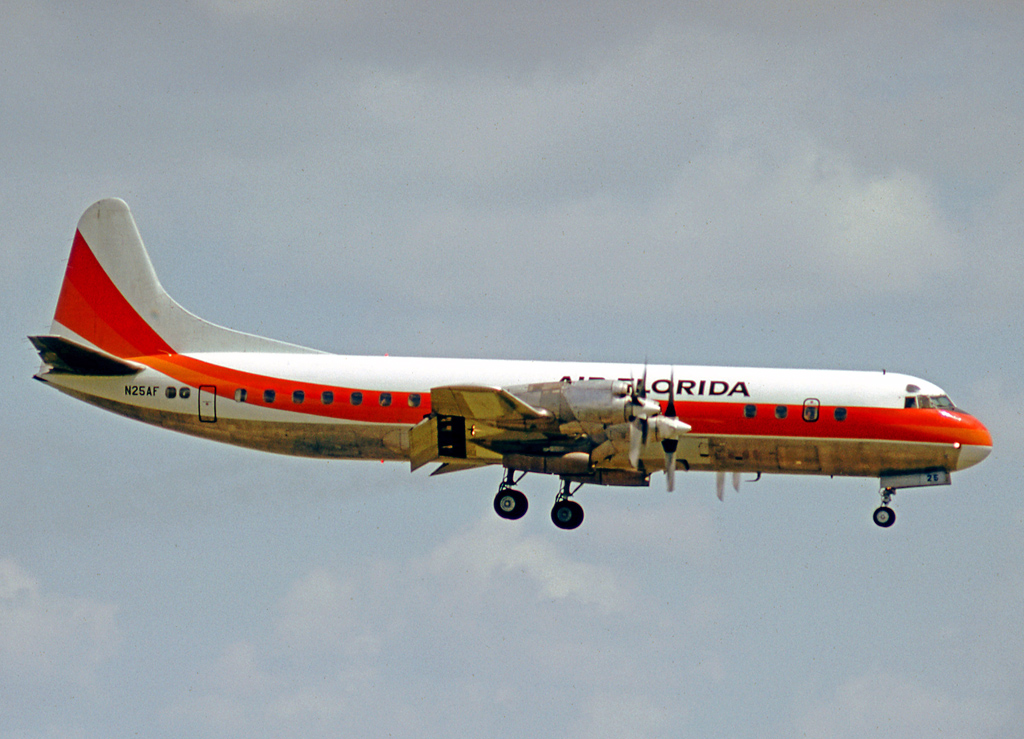
Air Florida Lockheed Electra

Air California was the one other notable California intrastate airline, not so much a rival to PSA as a complement, because its success was in large part due to being protected from PSA competition by its state regulator and by being part of a duopoly (from which PSA was excluded) at its main base.

Air Florida was unsuccessful for most of its intrastate existence, finally turning it around in the last year of regulation (1978). Air Florida thereafter expanded extremely rapidly in the early years of deregulation and was celebrated as the "little airline that could" until a devastating accident in early 1982, after which it fell on hard times until its bankruptcy in 1984. After being grounded for three months, it operated in Chapter 11 as Midway Express, flying under contract to Midway Airlines until being acquired by that airline in 1985.

Southwest is now the largest airline in the US by domestic passengers carried. Southwest was fortunate that deregulation occurred when it did, almost at the exact time the airline ran out of Texas cities to which to expand. Southwest had swept Texas of competition but had not had a chance to lose its competitive fire, its focus nor discipline. It simply kept methodically expanding nationally the same way it had within Texas.
