= Community Foundation of the Eastern Shore =

Non-profit foundation in Salisbury, Maryland, US

Community Foundation of the Eastern Shore, Inc.
- Formation: April 10, 1984; 42 years ago
- Type: Non-Profit Community Foundation
- Tax ID no.: 52-1326014
- Location: Salisbury, Maryland
- Coordinates: 38.369192°N 75.569709°W
- Region served: Somerset County, Maryland, Wicomico County, Maryland, Worcester County, Maryland
- Method: Donations and Grants
- Board Chair: Velda Henry
- President: Erica Joseph
- Board of directors: 25
- Key people: David Plotts (Vice President, Finance and Administration); Sharon Dickson (Vice President, Community Investment); Jessica Meehan (Senior Director, Advancement)
- Endowment: $161 million (Fiscal 2021)
- Staff: 11
- Website: cfes.org
- Member of Maryland Association of Nonprofit Organizations and Council on Foundations

The Community Foundation of the Eastern Shore (CFES) was established in 1984, and is located in Salisbury, Maryland. Its mission is to "To strengthen our community by connecting people who care with causes that matter to improve quality of life in our region" and its vision is for "...a community where all can live, learn, work, create and prosper". It serves the three lower counties of the Eastern Shore of Maryland: Somerset, Wicomico, and Worcester.

Annually CFES awards more than $6 million in grants and scholarships. In June 2010, the Council on Foundations released a report titled Benchmarking Beyond Asset Size which ranked the Community Foundation of the Eastern Shore 23 in the nation, out of over 700 community foundations, for receiving the most gifts per capita for fiscal year 2009. The same report was released in April 2014 ranking CFES 84 in the nation for most gifts received per capita for fiscal year 2013.

CFES is one of a growing number of community foundations across the U.S. and the world, and is a 501(c)(3) public charity organization.

== Philanthropic funds ==
CFES works with individuals, families, businesses, and nonprofit partners to establish funds suited to their philanthropic needs. Available funds are donor-advised, designated, field of interest, scholarship, unrestricted, and agency. Each donor's funds are pooled for investment management purposes to minimize costs and achieve a greater return, therefore making it possible for a smaller individual fund to enjoy the same benefits as a large foundation.

The Foundation is also able to respond to urgent community needs through funds such as the Disaster Fund which supported areas such as Crisfield, Maryland affected by Hurricane Sandy and the Tri-County region during the 2020 COVID-19 pandemic in Maryland. Another urgent need fund is the Help Your Neighbor Fund. This fund provides pharmaceutical, food, and utility assistance to over 150 local charities.

Another example of funds that benefit the community are two funds established in July 2011 to benefit the Salisbury Police Department: Salisbury Police Department K-9 and Mounted Unit Fund, which will establish a K-9 unit and reestablish the mounted unit, and the Salisbury Police Department Future Officer Recruits College Education Scholarship Fund, which will allow the Salisbury Police Department to offer college scholarships to the 2-year Criminal Justice program at Wor-Wic Community College.

In 2011 the Foundation's donors launched The Women's Fund, which provides grants that address the needs of women and girls in the Maryland Counties of Somerset, Wicomico, and Worcester. They focus of financial literacy, housing, counseling, job training, and education.

In 2015 CFES launched Shore Gives More, a Giving Tuesday campaign, raising $7,500 for 23 local nonprofits. In 2017, over $164,000 was raised for 80 nonprofits. In 2018, 99 local nonprofits are participating. With this campaign, CFES contracts with a 3rd party platform, currently CiviCore to operate a giving day at no cost to the nonprofit, other than credit card fees, thanks to its sponsors 47ABC, Pohanka of Salisbury, the Perdue Family Fund, and the Hershey Family Fund.

== Grant opportunities ==
CFES offers grants to local nonprofit, community, and faith-based organizations. Grant programs are Community Needs, Education Awards, Neighborhood Grants, Workforce Development, Women's Fund, and a Mini-Grants Program. The Mini-Grants program encompasses many programs such as the Technical Mini-Grant Program, Help Your Neighbor Program, Chairman's Fund, and various Field of Interest and Designated Funds.

== ShoreCAN volunteer center ==
In 2009, CFES established the ShoreCAN Volunteer Center. The purpose of the Volunteer Center was to "connect local nonprofit organizations that need volunteers with individuals on the Lower Shore who are looking for volunteer opportunities." ShoreCAN served the same tri-county area as CFES. The ShoreCAN Volunteer Center collaborated with the Salisbury University Volunteer Center on volunteers and opportunities. The Volunteer Center operated through HandsON Connect, a volunteer portal powered by the HandsOn Network and the Points of Light Institute.

The ShoreCAN Volunteer Center was partially funded in 2009 and 2010 through the Community Experience Partnership of the Atlantic Philanthropies. CFES was one of 30 community foundations selected to participate in The Community Experience Partnership. The second phase of the Community Experience Partnership was focused on volunteerism for the 50+ population.

In 2011, the ShoreCAN Volunteer Center received a three-year grant through the Maryland Governor's Office of Service and Volunteerism from the Corporation for National and Community Service's Volunteer Generation Fund. The Volunteer Generation Fund was established as part of the Edward M. Kennedy Serve America Act. The Volunteer Center is also sponsored by Delmarva Power.

In 2015, in an effort to avoid duplication of services, the Community Foundation of the Eastern Shore joined forces with the United Way of the Lower Eastern Shore, and migrated the nonprofits listed on ShoreCAN to the United Way's Get Connected database platform.

== Publications ==
=== Newsletter ===
CFES publishes quarterly newsletters titled The Pillar.

=== Television ===
The local public-access television cable TV station, PAC 14, produces a monthly television show titled Community Foundation Spotlight. On this show CFES President Erica Joseph interviews executive directors from various local nonprofits.

== Annual awards ==
The Community Foundation awards three awards at their Annual Meeting each November. The Henson Award for Nonprofit Excellence was established in 1989 to recognize Richard A. Henson's contributions to the community. The Frank H. Morris Humanitarian Award was established to recognize Frank H. Morris' dedication to humanitarian ideals. In 2011, the Mary Gladys Jones Volunteer of the Year Award was established to recognize an individual who made outstanding contributions to community service and volunteerism.

Year	Richard A. Henson Award for Nonprofit Excellence Recipient	Frank H. Morris Morris Humanitarian Award Recipient	Mary Gladys Jones Volunteer of the Year Award Recipient
1989	American Red Cross		
1990	Dove Pointe, Inc.		
1991	Coastal Hospice & Palliative Care		
1992	Joseph House Village	Anne W. Taylor	
1993	Christian Shelter, Inc.	J. Arthur DeHoff, Jr.	
1994	Big Brothers Big Sisters of the Lower Eastern Shore	Anna Emond	
1995	Life Crisis Center, Inc.	George I. Whitehead, III	
1996	Habitat on Maryland's Lower Shore	Charles B. "Benny" Riddick	
1997	Salisbury Neighborhood Housing Services, Inc.	Jack R. Nichols	
1998	Maple Shade Youth and Family Services, Inc.	Virginia B. Layfield	
1999	Fruitland Community Center	Paul Rendine	
2000	Diakonia, Inc.	Kaye S. Thomas	
2001	Salisbury Urban Ministries	Edward T. Taylor	
2002	Seton Center	Lewis Casey Parsons	
2003	United Way of the Lower Eastern Shore	James G. Barrett	
2004	MAC, Inc.	Richard F. Hazel	
2005	Worcester County G.O.L.D.	Dr. Clara Small	
2006	Easter Seals DE and MD's Eastern Shore	Hattie Miller	
2007	Lower Shore Enterprises	Jack Lewis	
2008	Habitat for Humanity of Wicomico County & Village of Hope	Jay Tawes	
2009	Kids of Honor	William Gordy	
2010	Women Supporting Women	Donna Clark & Celeste Savage	
2011	Worcester Youth and Family Counseling Services	Martin T. Neat	Mary Gladys Jones
2012	Delmarva Zoological Society	Gerald B. Truitt	Al Nurmi & John Leatherbury
2013	Coastal Hospice	Deborah S. Abbott	Alexis P. Dashield
2014	Salisbury Wicomico Arts Council & Magi Fund	Arthur M. Cooley	Dave Duitscher
2015	Art League of Ocean City	Tom Hershey	Barbara Whitehead
2016	Help and Outreach Point of Entry, Inc. (HOPE)	Mary Gladys Jones	Walter McCabe
2017	The Delmarva Discovery Center	Bonnie Luna	Pat Vorus
2018	Junior Achievement of the Eastern Shore	Col. Bob Cook	Ed Montgomery
2019	Chesapeake Housing Mission	Pam and Macky Stansell	Ace Parker
2020	Operation We Care	Grace Murdock	Shawna Keasley
2021	Ward Museum of Wildfowl Art	Peggy Bradford	Martin Hutchison

== History ==
1984 - The Salisbury Regional Community Foundation was formed by the Greater Salisbury Committee . First Executive Director - Bob Cook.

1985 - Richard A. Henson announces $1 million gift to the Foundation. First endowed funds established. First grants to Life Crisis Center and Coastal Hospice for $1,000 each.

1987 - Foundation formally changes its name to Community Foundation of the Eastern Shore

1988 - Foundation's assets reach $1 million.

1994 - Foundation's 10th anniversary. Assets are $6.9 million.

1995 - Grants to the community exceed $1.5 million.

1996 - Foundation's assets reach $10 million.

1999 - Selected by the Kresge Foundation for a campaign to raise community capital. Foundation's assets reach $20 million.

2000 - Foundation completes the Kresge Challenge phase 1, receiving $1 million from the community and a match of $1 million from the Kresge Foundation.

2000 - Frank and Mitzi Perdue announce a gift of $4 million to the Foundation.

2001 - Foundation's assets reach $30 million.

2002 - Foundation grants $50 thousand to Wor-Wic Community College to expand their nursing program.

2003 - Foundation is the first to receive the Seal of Excellence from the Maryland Association of Nonprofit Organizations.

2004 - Foundation's 20th anniversary. Assets reach $42 million.

2006 - Foundation purchases permanent facility, sets up regional Nonprofit Support Center.

2006 - Foundation selected as one of 10 foundations nationwide to participate in Partners Investing in Nursing's Future, a national initiative of the Robert Wood Johnson Foundation and the Northwest Health Foundation.

2009 - Foundation's 25th anniversary. Assets reach $68.2 million. 25th Anniversary Partnership Prize awarded to The Family Connections Community Service Center. Over $3 million in grants was awarded, and $185,000 in scholarships from over 100 scholarship funds.

2009 - Foundation opens ShoreCAN Volunteer Center.

2010 - Foundation offers office space to nonprofits in their Nonprofit Office Center. Initial nonprofits occupying space include: Women Supporting Women, Del-Mar-Va Council Boy Scouts of America, Delmarva Education Foundation, Delmarva Water Transport Committee, and Delmarva Low Impact Tourism Experiences.

2011 - Foundation's donors launch The Women's Fund which quickly reaches $100,000 in donations in five months.
One of three Community Foundations featured in a study by The Center for Effective Philanthropy, as evidence of the use of strategic planning.

2014 - Foundation makes three Pearls of Service awards as part of their 30th Anniversary Gala. Awards of a $10,000 endowment fund were made to MAC, Inc., Seton Center, and Diakonia.

2019 - Foundation marked its 35th anniversary with a SPARK campaign for Lower Shore Education. This campaign challenged the Wicomico and Worcester County Education Foundations and Somerset County Public Schools to raise $35,000, to which the Foundation would match.

2020 - Foundation establishes COVID-19 Emergency Response Fund with funding from the Richard A. Henson Foundation, Perdue Farms, Carefirst, Delmarva Power, M&T Bank, First Shore Federal, and numerous local donors.

== See also ==
- Community foundation
