= Homer Gudelsky =

- Born: Homer Sidney Gudelsky; March 26, 1911; Maryland
- Died: July 13, 1989 (aged 78); University of Maryland Hospital, Baltimore
- Occupations: Real estate developer and philanthropist
- Spouse: Martha

Homer Sidney Gudelsky (1911–1989) was a prominent American real estate developer and philanthropist in the Baltimore-Washington area who helped develop major shopping malls including Tysons Corner Center and Westfield Wheaton, as well as much of the waterfront in West Ocean City, including the Sunset Marina, Martha's Landing, and the Ocean City Fishing Center. One of the wealthiest people in the region, Gudelsky made his fortune mining sand and gravel and constructing roads. A 1963 sale of land in Howard County to James Rouse allowed the Rouse Company to begin construction of the planned community of Columbia.

== Life ==
Gudelsky's father Abraham was a Polish-Jewish immigrant who had found success as a junk dealer in Baltimore. He had a wife named Martha; five children: Avrum Gudelsky, Rita Regino, Medda Gudelsky, Holly Stone and John Gudelsky; and eight grandchildren. After 1974, Gudelsky moved to Boca Raton, Florida. Gudelsky died from leukemia in 1989 at age 78.

During the 1970s and the 1980s, a bitter fight among the Gudelsky family was waged in the courts. Homer and his brother Isadore together had created the Contee Sand & Gravel Co., later renamed Percontee. Following Isadore's death in 1963, his widow Bertha accused Homer of improperly withholding Isadore's $4 million dollar Contee share for 5 years before distributing it to her. Bertha Gudelsky filed a lawsuit in 1973 alleging losses between 1963 and 1968. The case was brought to trial in Baltimore in November 1983. The case was dismissed in February 1984 after Bertha Gudelsky decided to drop the lawsuit.

== Legacy ==
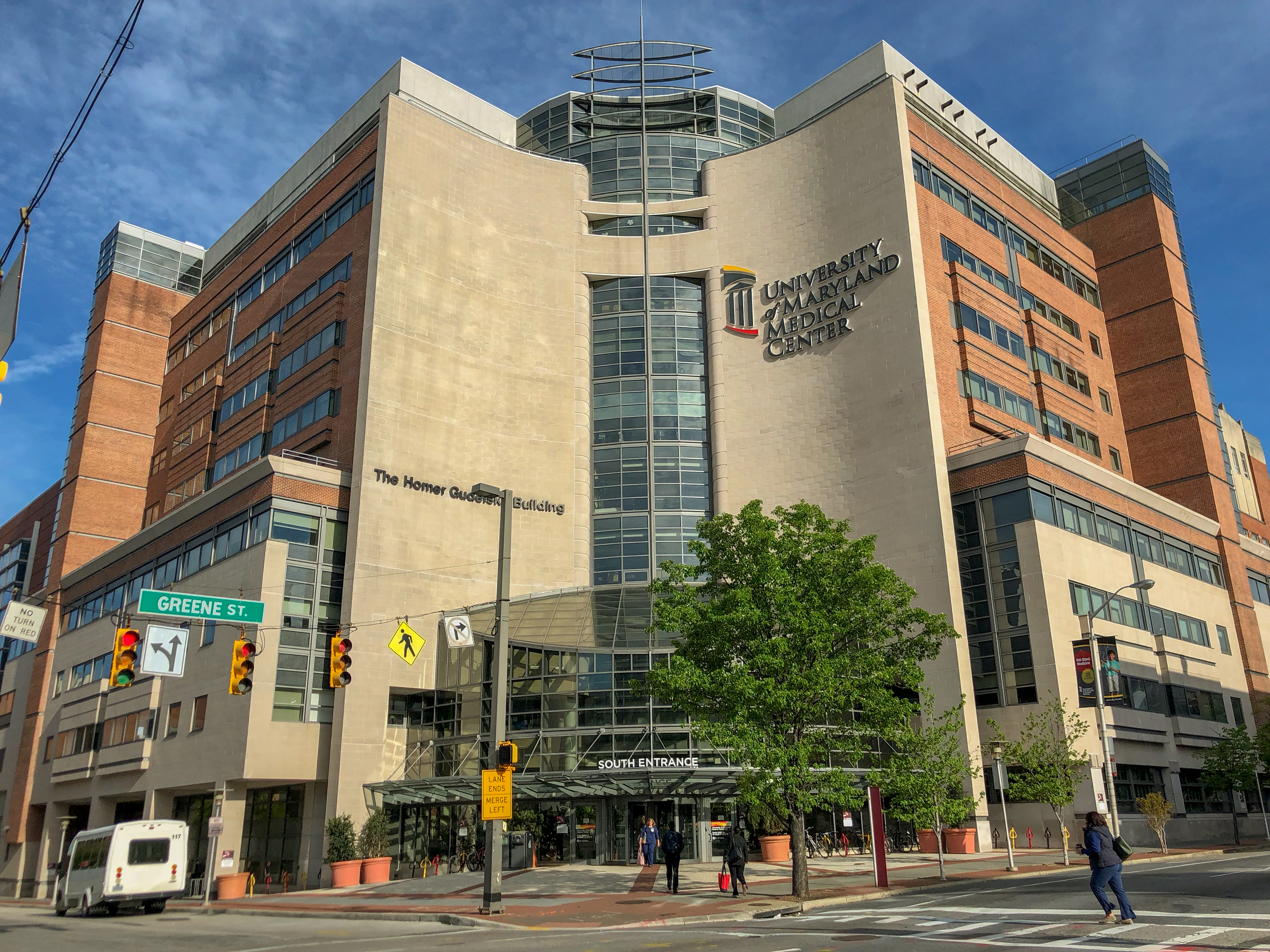
The Gudelsky Building of the University of Maryland Medical Center, April 2018.

In 1964, with the help of Gudelsky, the B'nai Israel Congregation acquired land for educational center at the intersection of Georgia Avenue and Evans Drive in Wheaton, Maryland. In 1967, the center opened as the Paul Himmelfarb Hebrew School of Congregation B'nai Israel.

The Homer and Martha Gudelsky Foundation, a philanthropy organization, was founded by Gudelsky in 1968. $300,000 in donations from the foundation were gifted to the Coastal Hospice & Palliative Care in Berlin, Maryland, a hospice center serving the growing elderly population of Worcester County.

The Gudelsky Building of the University of Maryland Medical Center is named in honor of Homer Gudelsky.

Homer Gudelsky Park in West Ocean City, Maryland was named in honor of Gudelsky. The property was a gift to Worcester County Recreation & Parks. The beach is colloquially known as Stinky Beach by many locals.
