= Sun Air Express =

Airline of the United States

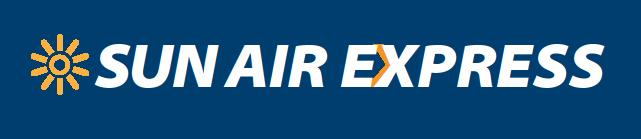
IATA	ICAO	Call sign
6G	FDY	FRIENDLY
- Commenced operations: 2012; 13 years ago
- Ceased operations: March 7, 2016; 9 years ago (bought by Southern Airways Express)
- Fleet size: 12
- Destinations: 8
- Parent company: Sun Air Express, LLC
- Headquarters: Dania Beach, Florida, USA
- Key people: Philip LeFevre (President, COO); Mark Cestari (VP Marketing); Roy Canter (VP Customer Care)
- Website: http://www.flysunairexpress.com

Sun Air Express was a United States airline with its headquarters in Dania Beach, Florida in Greater Miami (the headquarters had a Fort Lauderdale mailing address). It operates charter services as well as scheduled passenger services subsidized under the federal Essential Air Service (EAS) program.

The airline ended subsidized scheduled service to Victoria Regional Airport from George Bush Intercontinental Airport in Houston, Texas on October 31, 2014 after its two-year EAS contract expired. A little over a month later, Sun Air began service from Washington Dulles International Airport to Lancaster Airport (Pennsylvania) and Hagerstown Regional Airport in Maryland.

Sun Air had planned to begin service between Atlanta and Middle Georgia Regional Airport in Macon, Georgia on December 1, 2012. However, the airline decided to pull out of the airport deal.

Sun Air Express had a focus city at Pittsburgh International Airport and provided frequent daily service to Altoona, Hagerstown (Maryland), Jamestown (New York), Lancaster, Bradford and Franklin/Oil City.

Upon beginning scheduled service, Sun Air Express' passenger bookings were handled by Pacific Wings and their flight listings in travel reservation systems were under Pacific Wings' IATA code, LW. On April 21, 2015, Sun Air Express flights began being handled by and listed under the code of Mokulele Airlines, (6G).

As of November 2013, Sun Air International received $6,583,848 in annual Federal subsidies for Essential Air Services that they provided to Hagerstown, Maryland, Lancaster, Pennsylvania and Victoria, Texas airports in the U.S.

On March 7, 2016, Southern Airways Express bought Sun Air Express for an undisclosed amount. It will continue the routes currently running and will keep the focus cities that were established by Sun Air. The company withdrew from its Jamestown service after losing Essential Air Service funding.

== Destinations ==
State	City served	Airport	Notes
Pennsylvania	Altoona	Altoona–Blair County Airport	
Pennsylvania	Bradford	Bradford Regional Airport	
Pennsylvania	Franklin	Venango Regional Airport	
New York	Jamestown	Chautauqua County-Jamestown Airport	
Maryland	Hagerstown	Hagerstown Regional Airport	
Pennsylvania	Lancaster	Lancaster Airport (Pennsylvania)	
Pennsylvania	Pittsburgh	Pittsburgh International Airport	Focus City
Virginia Washington, D.C.	Washington, D.C.	Washington Dulles International Airport	

== Fleet ==
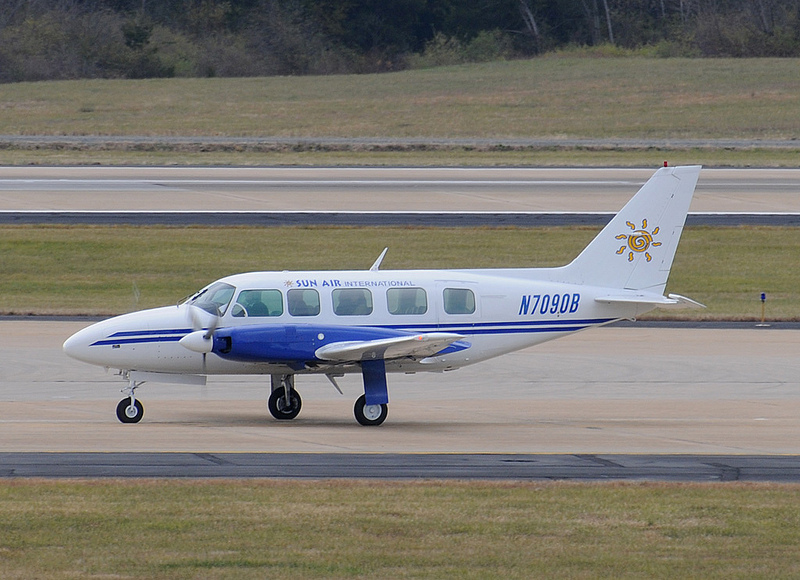
Sun Air International Piper Navajo N7090B at IAD.

Aircraft	In service	Passengers	Notes
Piper PA-31 Navajo	9	8	
Cessna 208B Grand Caravan	3	9	All aircraft leased from and operated by Mokulele Airlines.

== See also ==
- List of defunct airlines of the United States
