= Salisbury Police =

Salisbury Police may refer to one of the following police forces:

- Salisbury City Police, a defunct city police force, operational between 1836 and 1943, covering the city of Salisbury, Wiltshire.
- Salisbury Police Department, a nationally accredited full-service agency serving Salisbury, Maryland.
