= Isadore Gudelsky =

Real estate developer and philanthropist

- Born: Isadore Morton Gudelsky; September 15, 1904; Baltimore, Maryland
- Died: December 17, 1963 (aged 59); Suburban Hospital, Bethesda, Maryland
- Occupation(s): Real estate developer and philanthropist
- Spouse: Bertha

Isadore Morton Gudelsky (1904-1963) was a prominent real estate developer and philanthropist in the Baltimore-Washington metropolitan region during the 1930s to 1960s. Gudelsky helped develop shopping malls, apartment complexes, and industrial parks in Maryland.

== Life ==
Gudelsky was born in Baltimore on September 15th, 1904. His brother Homer Gudelsky also became prominent in the real estate industry. Gudelsky was married to and survived by his wife Bertha Gudelsky.

== Career ==
Gudelsky arrived in Silver Spring, Maryland in 1930 and established a gravel business in White Oak with his brother Homer. Gudelsky took over for his father Abraham Gudelsky, who had started the gravel business in 1911. Notable Gudelsky developments included the Tysons Corner Center in McLean, Virginia and the Westfield Wheaton mall in Wheaton, Maryland.

== Death ==
Gudelsky died at the age of 59 on December 17th, 1963 at Suburban Hospital in Bethesda, Maryland. He is buried at Mount Lebanon Memorial Park Cemetery in Adelphi, Maryland.

== Legacy ==
During the 1970s and the 1980s, a bitter fight among the Gudelsky family was waged in the courts. Isadore and his brother Homer together had developed the Contee Sand & Gravel Co., later renamed Percontee. Following Isadore's death, his widow Bertha accused Homer of improperly withholding Isadore's $4 million dollar Contee share for 5 years before distributing it to her. Bertha Gudelsky filed a lawsuit in 1973 alleging losses between 1963 and 1968. The case was brought to trial in Baltimore in November 1983. The case was dismissed in February 1984 after Bertha Gudelsky decided to drop the lawsuit.
