= Hagerstown Regional Airport =

Airport in Maryland, United States of America

Hagerstown Regional Airport Richard A. Henson Field

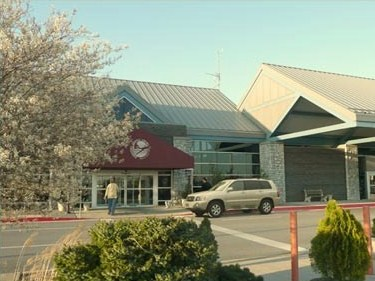
- IATA: HGR; ICAO: KHGR; FAA LID: HGR

Summary
- Airport type: Public
- Owner/Operator: Washington County
- Serves: Hagerstown, Maryland
- Elevation AMSL: 703 ft (214 m)
- Coordinates: 39°42′31″N 077°43′35″W
- Website: flyHGR.com

Maps
- FAA airport diagram
- Interactive map of Hagerstown Regional Airport

Runways
Direction	Length		Surface
Direction	ft	m	Surface
9/27	7,000	2,134	Asphalt
2/20	3,165	965	Asphalt

Statistics (2024)
- Passengers: 81,980
- Aircraft operations: 39,322
- Based aircraft: 160
- Source: Federal Aviation Administration

Hagerstown Regional Airport (IATA: HGR, ICAO: KHGR, FAA LID: HGR) (Richard A. Henson Field) is in Washington County, Maryland, 5 miles (8.0 km) north of Hagerstown, Maryland and a half mile (800 m) from the Maryland/Pennsylvania border. The airport is off Interstate 81 at exit 10 and U.S. Route 11, not far from Northern Virginia, South Central Pennsylvania, and the eastern panhandle of West Virginia.

The Federal Aviation Administration says this airport had 29,105 passenger boardings (enplanements) in calendar year 2019, 14,373 in 2020, 23,227 in 2021 and 32,197 in 2022. The National Plan of Integrated Airport Systems for 2023-2027 categorized it as a "non-hub primary commercial service airport" based on 2021 enplanements.

== History ==
The airfield opened in 1928 on 60 acres (24 ha) of farmland purchased by the Kreider-Reisner Aircraft Company. It was purchased by the City of Hagerstown in 1933.

In 1934, after purchase by Fairchild, Kreider-Reisner was renamed the Fairchild Aircraft Corporation. In the following years, an aircraft manufacturing facility was built on the Hagerstown municipal airport site. In the 1940s, the Fairchild Aircraft factory at Hagerstown produced PT-19 trainers and C-82 Packet transport aircraft for the war at the facility, designated Air Force Plant 11. After World War II, Fairchild would go on to produce C-119 and C-123 military transports and license-produce Fokker F27 airliners at Hagerstown. From 1973 to 1984, final assembly and checkout of the A-10 Thunderbolt II was performed at Hagerstown. Following A-10 production, Fairchild shut down the Hagerstown plant. In 57 years of operation, the Fairchild Aircraft factory had built over 10,000 aircraft.

The facility was named Washington County Regional Airport in 1981, when ownership was transferred from the City of Hagerstown to Washington County. In 1998, the county renamed it Hagerstown Regional Airport - Richard A. Henson Field.

Subsidiaries of US Airways Express had served Hagerstown Regional Airport for some time. The airport lost eligibility for Essential Air Service funding on October 1, 2007, because it was located less than 70 miles (110 km) from a larger airport. The last discontinued destination from Hagerstown by this air carrier group was Pittsburgh International Airport. Due to low ridership and the expired federal subsidy, Air Midwest ended their flights from Hagerstown on September 30, 2007.

Hagerstown Regional Airport was without an airline for just over a year until the advent of Allegiant Air which flew from Hagerstown Regional Airport to Orlando Sanford International Airport with two departures on Friday and two arrivals on Monday. The airline started commercial service on November 14, 2008. The airline used the McDonnell Douglas MD-82/MD-83 aircraft on this route. Scheduled service at Hagerstown ended on July 19, 2010, but service later resumed. On August 13, 2013, Allegiant began another hiatus from operations at Hagerstown Regional Airport. They resumed service on November 15, 2013, with afternoon flights.

Beginning on March 24, 2009, Cape Air served Hagerstown Regional with four flights daily on Cessna 402 aircraft to Baltimore-Washington International Airport in Baltimore. These flights were subsidized by the Essential Air Service federal program. This service ended in 2012 and was replaced on November 5, 2012 with EAS-subsidized service when Sun Air International began offering daily flights to Washington Dulles International Airport in suburban Washington, D.C.

On June 23, 2011 Hagerstown Regional Airport began service from Direct Air, operated by Dynamic Airways, to Lakeland, Florida, and Myrtle Beach, South Carolina. In August 2011, Direct Air decided to temporarily suspend service from Hagerstown, saying that demand for service during the winter was expected to decrease. Direct Air stated they would consider returning to the Hagerstown market in the spring of 2012. Direct Air was subject to Chapter 7 liquidation on April 12, 2012.

Hagerstown Regional Airport's eligibility for Essential Air Service was planned to be cut because the airport had fewer than ten enplanements per service day in 2013, in accordance with the FAA Modernization Act of 2012. United States Senators Ben Cardin and Barbara A. Mikulski and U.S. Congressman John Delaney advocated for the United States Department of Transportation to approve a waiver, pointing to a significant increase in enplanements in early 2014. The Department of Transportation approved the waiver, and Hagerstown Regional Airport retained its eligibility for Essential Air Service.

In February 2015 Allegiant Air began nonstop jet service twice weekly to St. Petersburg/Clearwater International Airport, which was followed by twice weekly service to Orlando Sanford International Airport.

By 2015, Hagerstown Aircraft Services, a maintenance, repair, and overhaul facility at the airport, had closed. A portion of the former Fairchild plant was put up for auction in 2017. After its cancellation due to the owner's bankruptcy, a portion of the plant was sold in August 2019 and the remainder was put up for auction.

In October 2019, the Department of Transportation again announced the end of Essential Air Service to Hagerstown, pending any successful appeals. Southern Airways Express subsequently announced the suspension of ticket sales for their routes from the airport in October 2019.

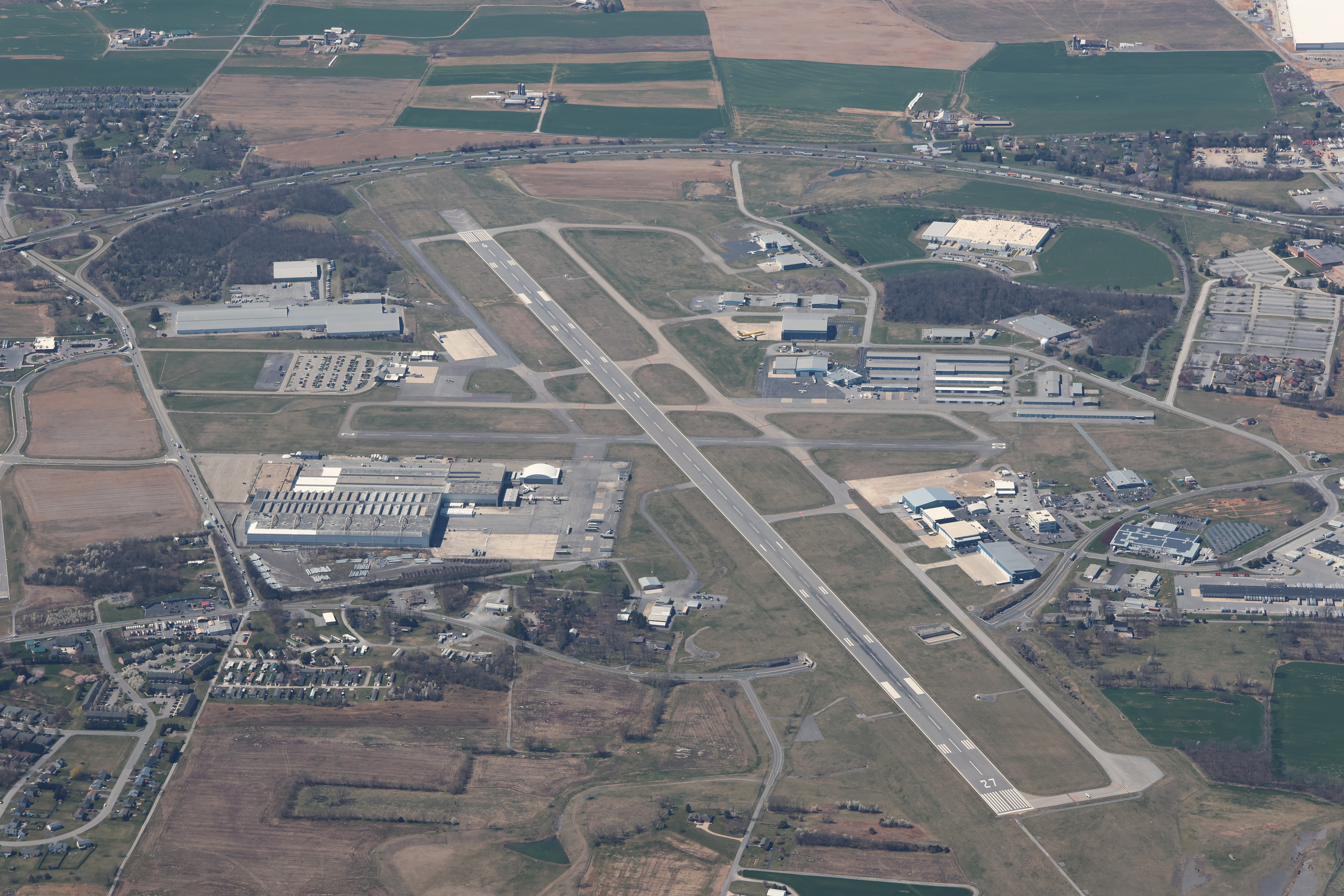
An aerial photo of Hagerstown Regional Airport. The former Fairchild plant is to the lower left of the intersection of the runways.

Given the location near Camp David, Air Force One has landed at Hagerstown Regional Airport on several occasions, but usually the Boeing C-32 aircraft rather than the Boeing VC-25 aircraft.

== Facilities ==
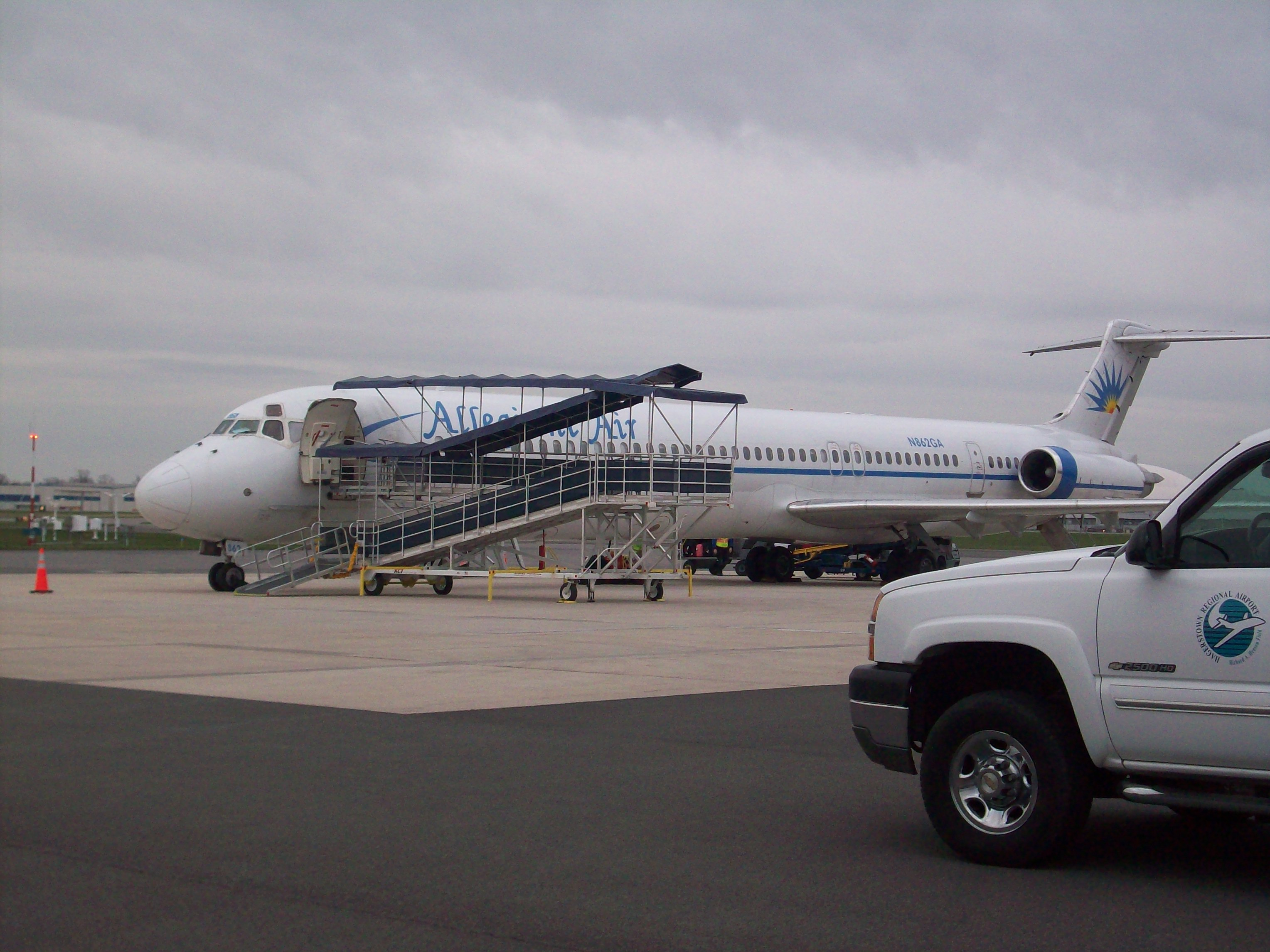
Allegiant Air MD-83 at HGR in 2009

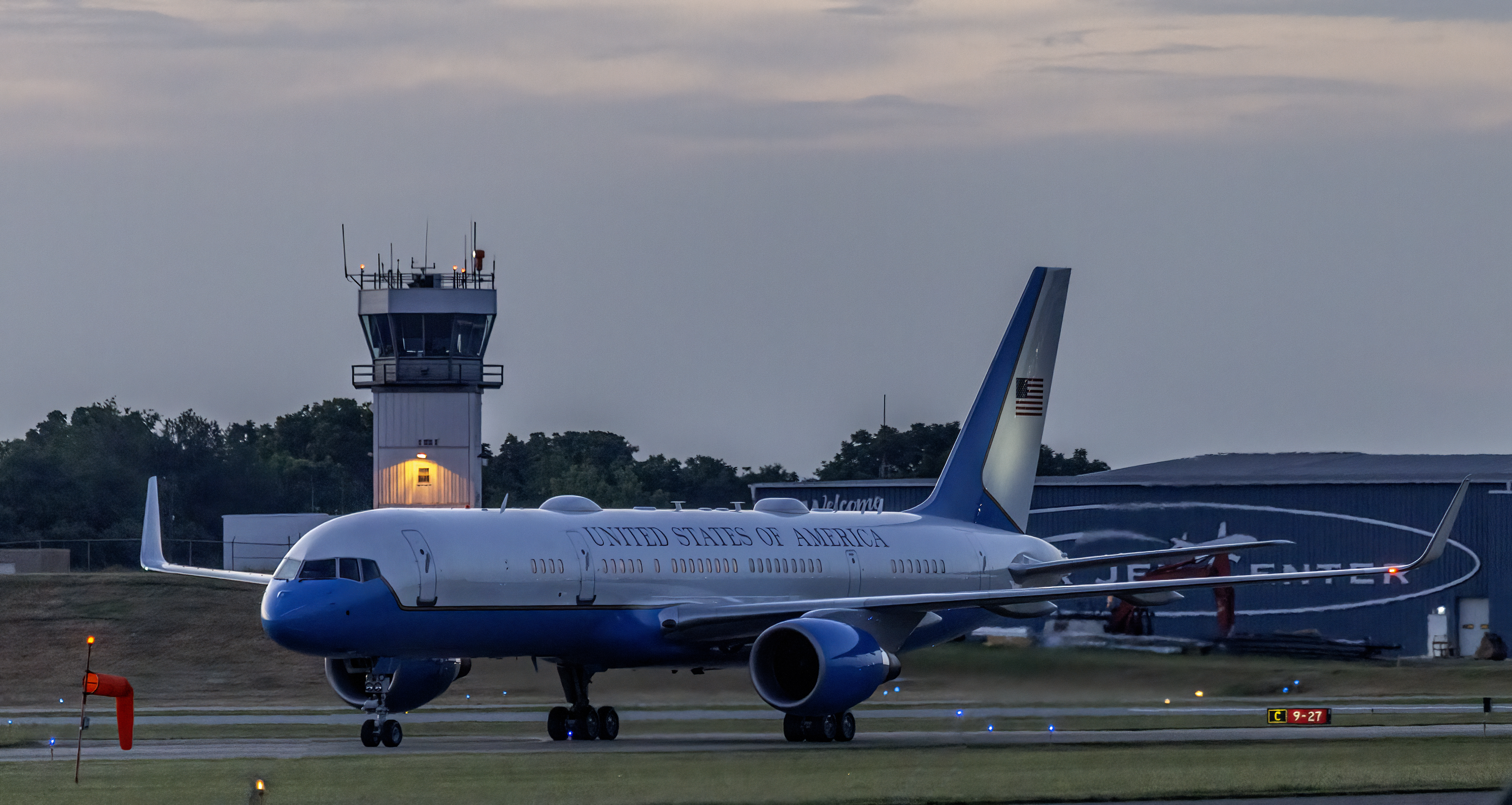
HGR is often utilized by the President of the United States during visits to nearby Camp David.

Hagerstown Regional Airport covers 693 acres (280 ha) at an elevation of 703 feet (214 m). It has two asphalt runways: 9/27 is 7,000 by 150 feet (2,134 x 46 m) and 2/20 is 3,165 by 100 feet (965 x 30 m).

In October 2010, a new 43,000-square-foot (4,000 m^{2}) hangar opened. Construction of the hangar was financed with $6.5 million of Recovery Zone Facility Bonds, a tax-exempt bond from the Maryland Department of Business and Economic Development for projects that stimulate business development projects in distressed areas.

In the year ending March 31, 2023, the airport had 39,303 aircraft operations, average 108 per day: 82% general aviation, 12% military, 5% air taxi, and 1% airline. 153 aircraft were then based at this airport: 126 single-engine, 18 multi-engine, 7 jet, 1 helicopter and 1 ultralight.

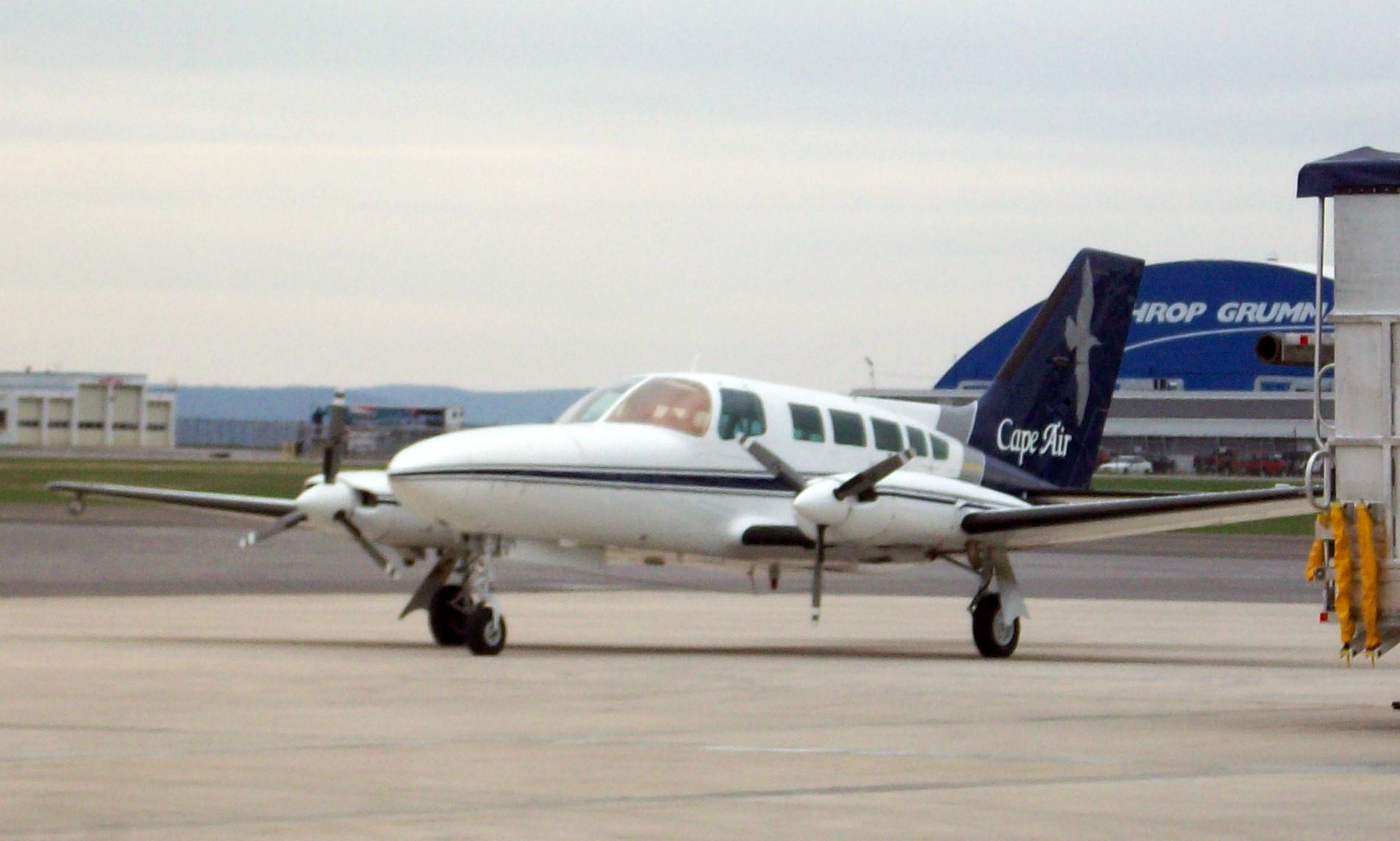
Cape Air Cessna 402 at HGR in 2009

In 2014 the United States Department of Transportation awarded a $1,000,000 grant to Hagerstown Regional Airport to plan and design major rehabilitation on two taxiways, including ensuring the structural integrity of the taxiway and adding LED safety lighting.

Rider Jet Center is the airport fixed-base operator. Dining is available at “the Grille at Runways” within the FBO and at Nick's Airport Inn Restaurant, however both are located on the north-side of the airport and not directly accessible from the south-side passenger terminal.

== Airline and destinations ==
Passenger:

Airlines	Destinations	Refs
Allegiant Air	Orlando/Sanford, St. Petersburg/Clearwater; Seasonal: Myrtle Beach	

Cargo:

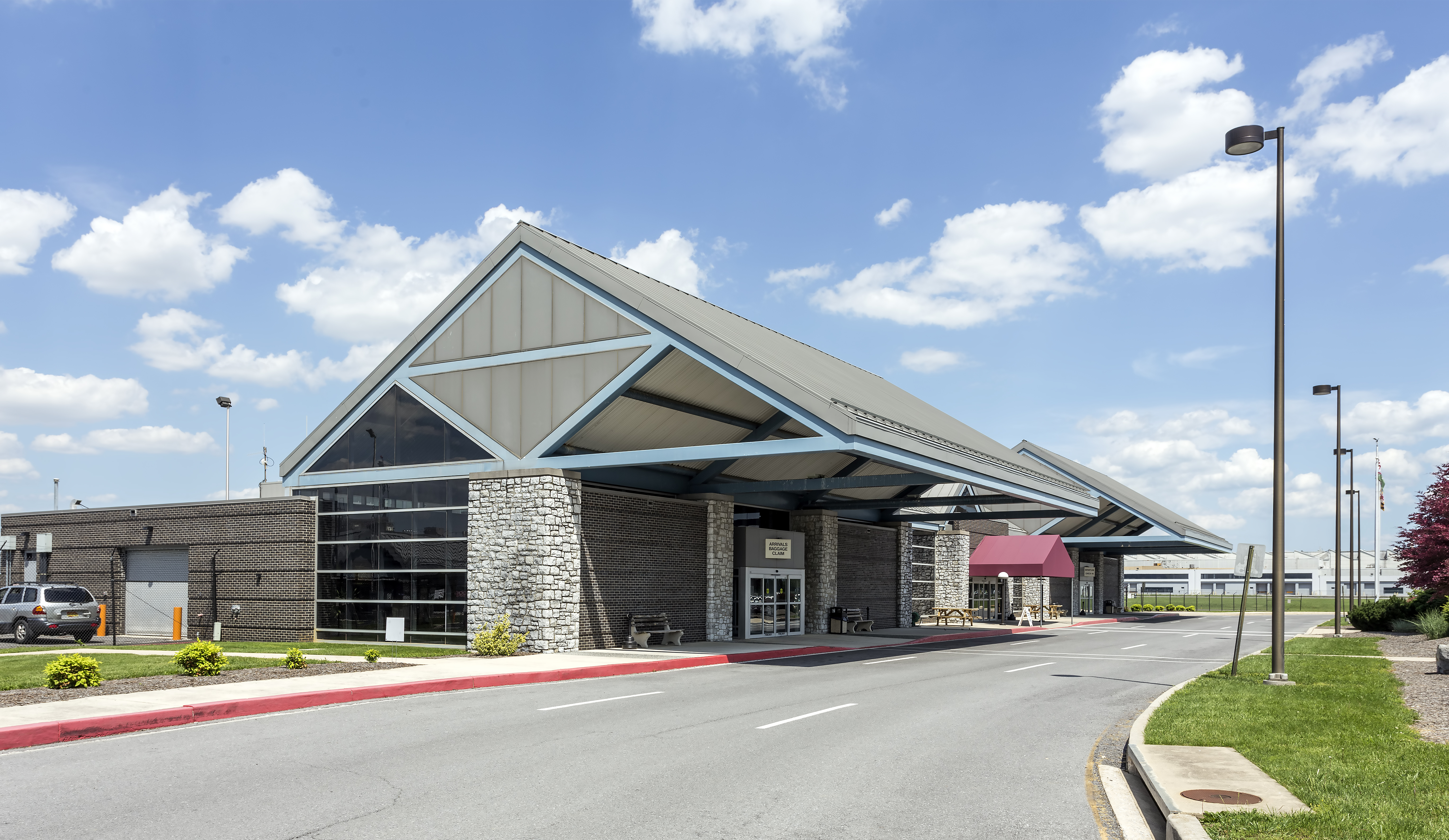
Commercial Airline Service Terminal - 18434 Showalter Road.

== Statistics ==
=== Top destinations ===
Busiest domestic routes from HGR (August 2025 – July 2026)
Rank	Airport	Passengers	Carriers
1	Orlando/Sanford, Florida	17,900	Allegiant
2	St. Petersburg/Clearwater, Florida	15,400	Allegiant
3	Myrtle Beach, South Carolina	9,080	Allegiant

=== Annual Traffic ===
Annual Traffic
Year	Passengers	Change from Previous Year	Airline(s)	Destination(s)	Total Cargo (Freight & Mail) (lbs.)	Change from Previous Year
2005	9,852		Air Midwest dba US Airways Express	Pittsburgh	36,000	
2006	11,711	▲18.87%	Air Midwest dba US Airways Express	Pittsburgh	49,000	▲37.19%
2007	5,413	▼53.78%	Air Midwest dba US Airways Express	Pittsburgh	22,000	▼55.75%
2008	3,286	▼39.29%	Allegiant	Orlando/Sanford	0	▼100.00%
2009	26,600	▲709.49%	Allegiant	Orlando/Sanford	16,000	▲100.00%
2009	26,600	▲709.49%	Cape Air	Baltimore	16,000	▲100.00%
2010	20,900	▼21.43%	Allegiant	Orlando/Sanford	0	▼100.00%
2010	20,900	▼21.43%	Cape Air	Baltimore	0	▼100.00%
2011	6,890	▼67.03%	Cape Air	Baltimore	17,000	▲100.00%
2012	20,030	▲190.71%	Allegiant	Orlando/Sanford	46,000	▲178.37%
2012	20,030	▲190.71%	Cape Air	Baltimore	46,000	▲178.37%
2012	20,030	▲190.71%	Sun Air Express	Washington–Dulles	46,000	▲178.37%
2013	25,010	▲24.86%	Allegiant	Orlando/Sanford	116,000	▲152.41%
2013	25,010	▲24.86%	Sun Air Express	Washington–Dulles	116,000	▲152.41%
2014	29,460	▲17.79%	Allegiant	Orlando/Sanford	56,000	▼51.89%
2014	29,460	▲17.79%	Sun Air Express	Washington–Dulles	56,000	▼51.89%
2015	49,630	▲68.47%	Allegiant	Orlando/Sanford	52,000	▼6.15%
2015	49,630	▲68.47%	Allegiant	St.Petersburg/Clearwater	52,000	▼6.15%
2015	49,630	▲68.47%	Sun Air Express	Pittsburgh	52,000	▼6.15%
2015	49,630	▲68.47%	Sun Air Express	Washington–Dulles	52,000	▼6.15%
2016	53,700	▲8.20%	Allegiant	Orlando/Sanford	15,000	▼72.13%
2016	53,700	▲8.20%	Allegiant	St.Petersburg/Clearwater	15,000	▼72.13%
2016	53,700	▲8.20%	Southern Airways Express	Baltimore	15,000	▼72.13%
2016	53,700	▲8.20%	Southern Airways Express	Pittsburgh	15,000	▼72.13%
2016	53,700	▲8.20%	Sun Air Express	Pittsburgh	15,000	▼72.13%
2016	53,700	▲8.20%	Sun Air Express	Washington–Dulles	15,000	▼72.13%
2017	50,370	▼6.61%	Allegiant	Orlando/Sanford	52,000	▲255.93%
2017	50,370	▼6.61%	Allegiant	St.Petersburg/Clearwater	52,000	▲255.93%
2017	50,370	▼6.61%	Southern Airways Express	Baltimore	52,000	▲255.93%
2017	50,370	▼6.61%	Southern Airways Express	Pittsburgh	52,000	▲255.93%
2018	46,480	▼7.72%	Allegiant	Orlando/Sanford	74,000	▲42.34%
2018	46,480	▼7.72%	Allegiant	St.Petersburg/Clearwater	74,000	▲42.34%
2018	46,480	▼7.72%	Southern Airways Express	Baltimore	74,000	▲42.34%
2018	46,480	▼7.72%	Southern Airways Express	Pittsburgh	74,000	▲42.34%
2019	57,220	▲23.11%	Allegiant	Myrtle Beach	7,567	▼89.77%
2019	57,220	▲23.11%	Allegiant	Orlando/Sanford	7,567	▼89.77%
2019	57,220	▲23.11%	Allegiant	St.Petersburg/Clearwater	7,567	▼89.77%
2019	57,220	▲23.11%	Southern Airways Express	Baltimore	7,567	▼89.77%
2019	57,220	▲23.11%	Southern Airways Express	Pittsburgh	7,567	▼89.77%
2020	28,750	▼49.76%	Allegiant	Myrtle Beach	25,000	▲227.90%
2020	28,750	▼49.76%	Allegiant	Orlando/Sanford	25,000	▲227.90%
2020	28,750	▼49.76%	Allegiant	St.Petersburg/Clearwater	25,000	▲227.90%
2021	45,690	▲58.92%	Allegiant	Myrtle Beach	0	▼100.00%
2021	45,690	▲58.92%	Allegiant	Orlando/Sanford	0	▼100.00%
2021	45,690	▲58.92%	Allegiant	St.Petersburg/Clearwater	0	▼100.00%
2022	63,340	▲38.63%	Allegiant	Myrtle Beach	7,912	▲100.00%
2022	63,340	▲38.63%	Allegiant	Orlando/Sanford	7,912	▲100.00%
2022	63,340	▲38.63%	Allegiant	St.Petersburg/Clearwater	7,912	▲100.00%
2023	64,840	▲2.37%	Allegiant	Myrtle Beach	112,000	▲1,317.42%
2023	64,840	▲2.37%	Allegiant	Orlando/Sanford	112,000	▲1,317.42%
2023	64,840	▲2.37%	Allegiant	St.Petersburg/Clearwater	112,000	▲1,317.42%
2024	81,980	▲26.43%	Allegiant	Myrtle Beach	4,962	▼95.58%
2024	81,980	▲26.43%	Allegiant	Orlando/Sanford	4,962	▼95.58%
2024	81,980	▲26.43%	Allegiant	St.Petersburg/Clearwater	4,962	▼95.58%

== Transportation ==
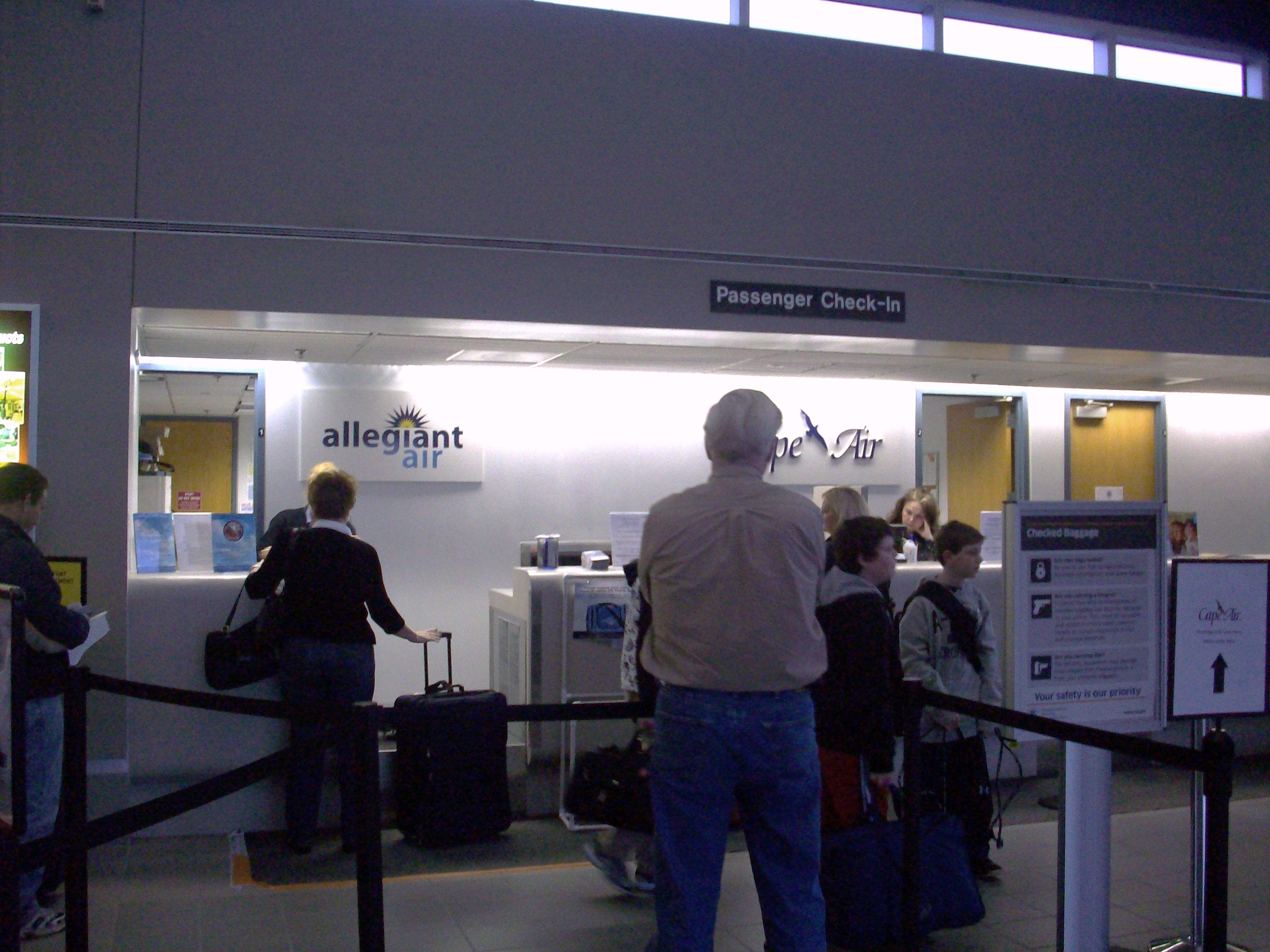
Check-in counters

Hagerstown Regional Airport is 15 minutes by car from downtown Hagerstown, and it is located directly off Interstate 81 and U.S. Route 11. Interstate 70 is 5 miles (8.0 km) south of the airport and the airport is accessible via Interstate 81. Parking at the airport is $5 per day with the first hour free. Car rental service are available at the airport. Taxi service is available to and from the airport upon request. Washington County Transit buses make regular stops at the airport, and there are also buses to nearby hotels.

== Incidents ==
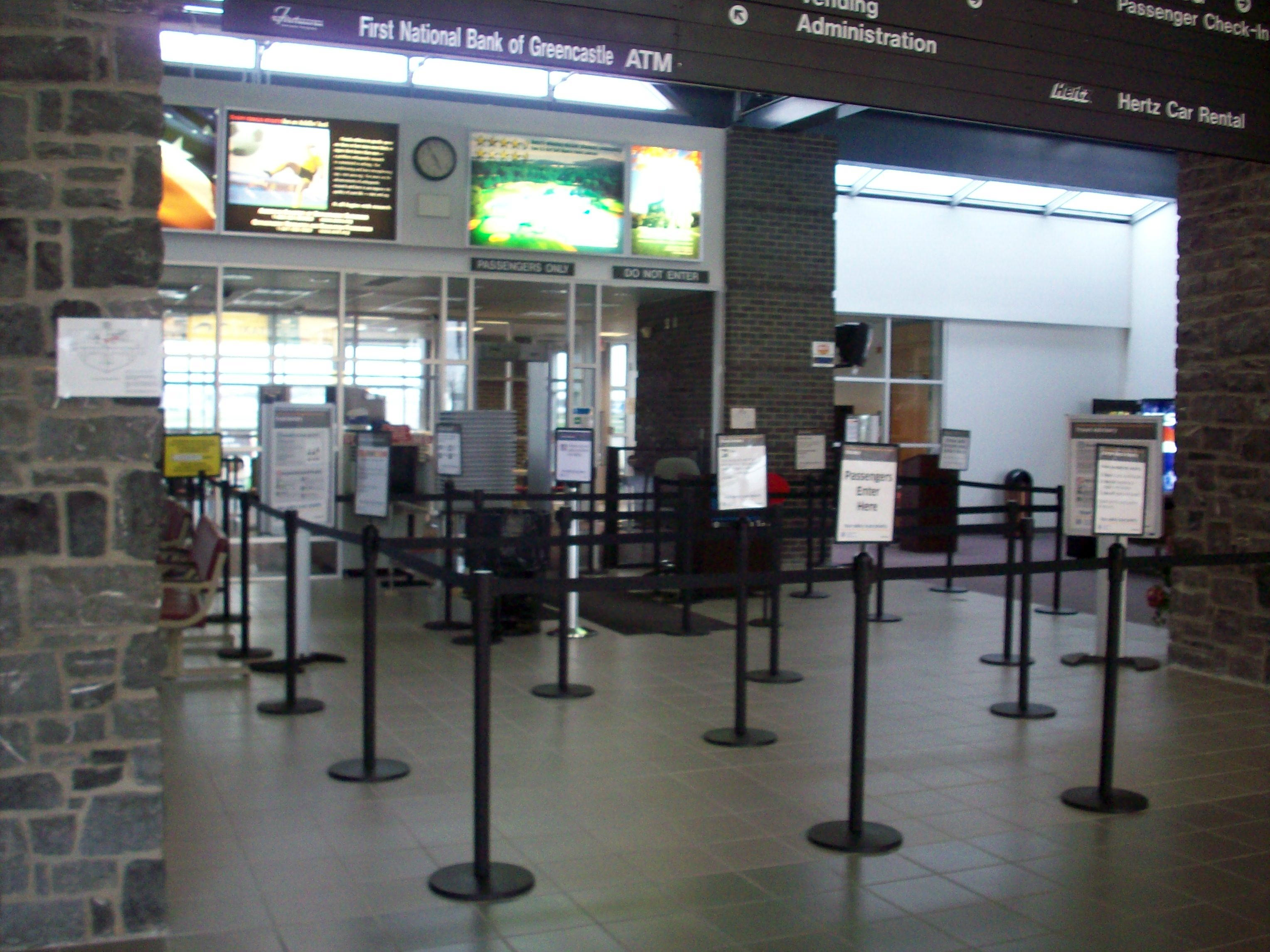
TSA security checkpoint

On February 19, 2005, a Cessna 402 landed without the right wheel of the main landing gear. The pilot managed to burn most of the fuel off to prevent a fire. The pilot was able to land on Runway 27 and all five people on board deplaned within minutes. Nobody was hurt. Several fire departments around the Tri-State area responded to the incident.

On July 23, 2009, a Robinson R-44 helicopter crashed shortly after taking off from Hagerstown Regional Airport. The helicopter crashed onto Interstate 70 near South Mountain at 10:30 p.m. Four people on board were killed and nobody on the ground was hurt.

== See also ==
- List of airports in Maryland

== Other sources ==
- Essential Air Service documents (Docket OST-2006-25228) from the U.S. Department of Transportation:
  - Order 2006-10-12 (October 25, 2006): selecting Mesa Air Group, Inc., d/b/a Air Midwest, Inc., to provide subsidized essential air service (EAS) at Hagerstown, Maryland, consisting of two nonstop round trips a day to Pittsburgh International Airport, at the annual subsidy rate of $854,452, beginning 45 days after the date of service of this order, or when the carrier inaugurates two-round-trip service, whichever occurs first, through September 30, 2007.
  - Order 2008-12-33 (December 31, 2008): selecting Hyannis Air Service, Inc. d/b/a Cape Air, to provide subsidized essential air service (EAS) at Hagerstown, Maryland, and Lancaster, Pennsylvania, beginning when the carrier inaugurates service, through September 30, 2009, at the annual subsidy rates of $1,203,167 for Hagerstown and $1,372,474 for Lancaster.
  - Order 2010-10-1 (October 1, 2010): extending the current subsidy contract of Cape Air to provide subsidized essential air service (EAS) at Hagerstown, Maryland, and Lancaster, Pennsylvania, through September 30, 2011.
  - Order 2012-2-13 (February 17, 2012): extending the contract of Hyannis Air Service, Inc. d/b/a Cape Air to provide subsidized Essential Air Service (EAS) at Hagerstown, Maryland, and Lancaster, Pennsylvania, until further notice; and requesting proposals from carriers interested in providing EAS at Hagerstown and/or Lancaster, through September 30, 2015, with or without subsidy.
  - Order 2012-8-9 (August 3, 2012): selecting Sun Air Express, LLC d/b/a Sun Air International, to provide subsidized Essential Air Service (EAS) with nine-passenger twin-engine Piper Chieftain aircraft at Hagerstown, Maryland, and Lancaster, Pennsylvania, through September 30, 2015. The annual subsidy rate for Hagerstown will be set at $1,785,638, and $2,504,174 for Lancaster, or a combined total of $4,289,812.
  - Order 2014-4-26 (April 24, 2014): directing interested persons to show cause as to why the Department should not terminate the eligibility ... under the Essential Air Service (EAS) program based on criteria passed by Congress in the FAA Modernization and Reform Act of 2012 (Public Law No. 112-95). We find that Hagerstown is within 175 miles of a large or medium hub, Washington Dulles International Airport (IAD), a large hub, and, thus, is subject to the 10-enplanement statutory criterion. We also find that during fiscal year 2013, Hagerstown generated a total of 2,419 passengers (inbound plus outbound). Consistent with the methodology described above, that results in an average of 3.9 enplanements per day, below the 10-enplanement statutory criterion necessary to remain eligible in the EAS program.
