= Piedmont Airlines =

American regional airline operating since 1962

Piedmont Airlines, Inc.

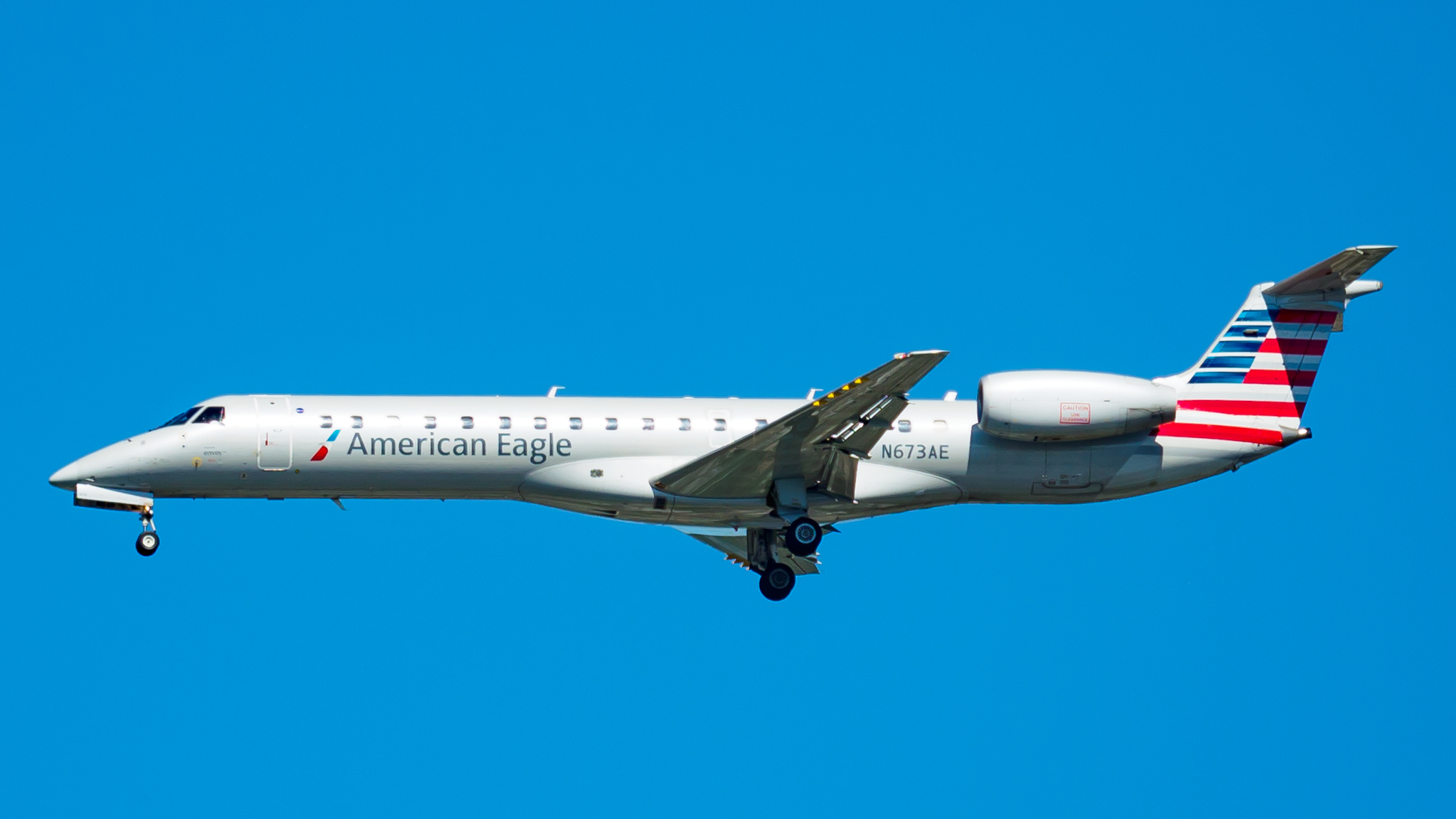
- Piedmont Airlines ERJ 145 operated for American Eagle
IATA	ICAO	Call sign
PT	PDT	PIEDMONT
- Founded: 1961; 65 years ago (as Henson Airlines)
- Commenced operations: 1962; 64 years ago (as Henson Airlines); 1993; 33 years ago (as Piedmont Airlines)
- AOC #: HNAA001A
- Hubs: Charlotte; Philadelphia
- Frequent-flyer program: AAdvantage
- Alliance: Oneworld (affiliate)
- Fleet size: 68
- Destinations: 55+
- Parent company: American Airlines Group
- Headquarters: Salisbury Regional Airport, Wicomico County, Maryland, United States
- Key people: Eric Morgan (President & CEO)
- Founder: Richard A. Henson
- Employees: 10,500 (2024)
- Website: piedmont-airlines.com

Piedmont Airlines, Inc. (/ˈpiːdmɒnt/ PEED-mont) is an American regional airline headquartered at the Salisbury Regional Airport in Wicomico County, Maryland, near the city of Salisbury. The airline is a wholly owned subsidiary of the American Airlines Group and it is paid by fellow group member American Airlines to staff, operate and maintain aircraft used on American Eagle flights that are scheduled, marketed and sold by American Airlines. Piedmont also provides ground handling and customer service for airports in the northeastern and western United States.

Piedmont operates a fleet consisting exclusively of Embraer ERJ 145 regional jet aircraft. Its main base is Charlotte Douglas International Airport with an additional hub at Philadelphia International Airport. The company has a team of more than 9,800 employees, operating flights to nearly 50 destinations.

Started in 1961 as Henson Airlines, the airline was rebranded in 1993 to re-use the name of the 1948–1989 airline, Piedmont Airlines, one of the predecessors of today's American Airlines, to protect the trademark.

== History ==
The airline was formed in 1961 by Richard A. Henson as Henson Aviation, a fixed-base operator in Hagerstown, Maryland. It began its first scheduled flights to Washington National Airport in 1962 under the Hagerstown Commuter name, later changed to Henson Airlines. Allegheny Airlines (which became US Airways, which in turn has now merged with American Airlines) and Henson began one of the world's first code sharing arrangements in 1967. Henson re-branded itself as an Allegheny Commuter carrier using Beechcraft 99 aircraft. It initially developed a route structure serving Washington D.C., Philadelphia and Baltimore, while establishing a new headquarters for Allegheny Commuter at Salisbury, Maryland in 1968. In the 1970s, the airline upgraded to Short 330 and de Havilland Canada Dash 7 turboprops.

In 1983, Piedmont Aviation bought Henson Airlines and re-branded the airline as "Henson, The Piedmont Regional Airline". Under Piedmont's control, the airline expanded rapidly, particularly in Florida. Both were purchased by the USAir Group in 1987 with Piedmont absorbed two years later and Henson's aircraft repainted in USAir Express livery. The 1980s saw rapid growth by the company with the upgrade of its fleet to the de Havilland Canada Dash 8 aircraft and fleet expansion. With the growth in capacity, the airline expanded to Florida, including numerous intrastate routes in Florida, and it opened a maintenance facility in Jacksonville.

The Piedmont name was resurrected in 1993, when USAir (the erstwhile Allegheny Airlines that became US Airways) renamed Henson to "Piedmont Airlines", to protect the Piedmont brand name, which could be used by others if not exercised in trade use for a period of time. USAir continued this practice by changing the name of its two other wholly owned regional airline subsidiaries, Jetstream and Suburban Airlines, to PSA Airlines and Allegheny Airlines, respectively (Pacific Southwest Airlines was the name of a California-based airline merged into USAir). In 1997, USAir was renamed US Airways, and Piedmont and Allegheny were likewise re-branded as US Airways Express carriers. US Airways merged Allegheny Airlines into Piedmont in 2004.

== Operations ==
The airline had more than 10,000 employees as of August 2022 and operated nearly 400 daily flights to more than 55 destinations.

As of January 2024, Piedmont is currently the exclusive operator at Pitt–Greenville Airport, Florence Regional Airport, and Watertown International Airport.

Piedmont Airlines currently flies under the American Eagle brand after a merger of American Airlines and US Airways in December 2013.

The airline operates maintenance bases in Albany, Charlotte, Harrisburg, Philadelphia, Richmond, Roanoke and Salisbury. Piedmont has crew bases in Charlotte, Harrisburg, and Philadelphia.

== Fleet ==
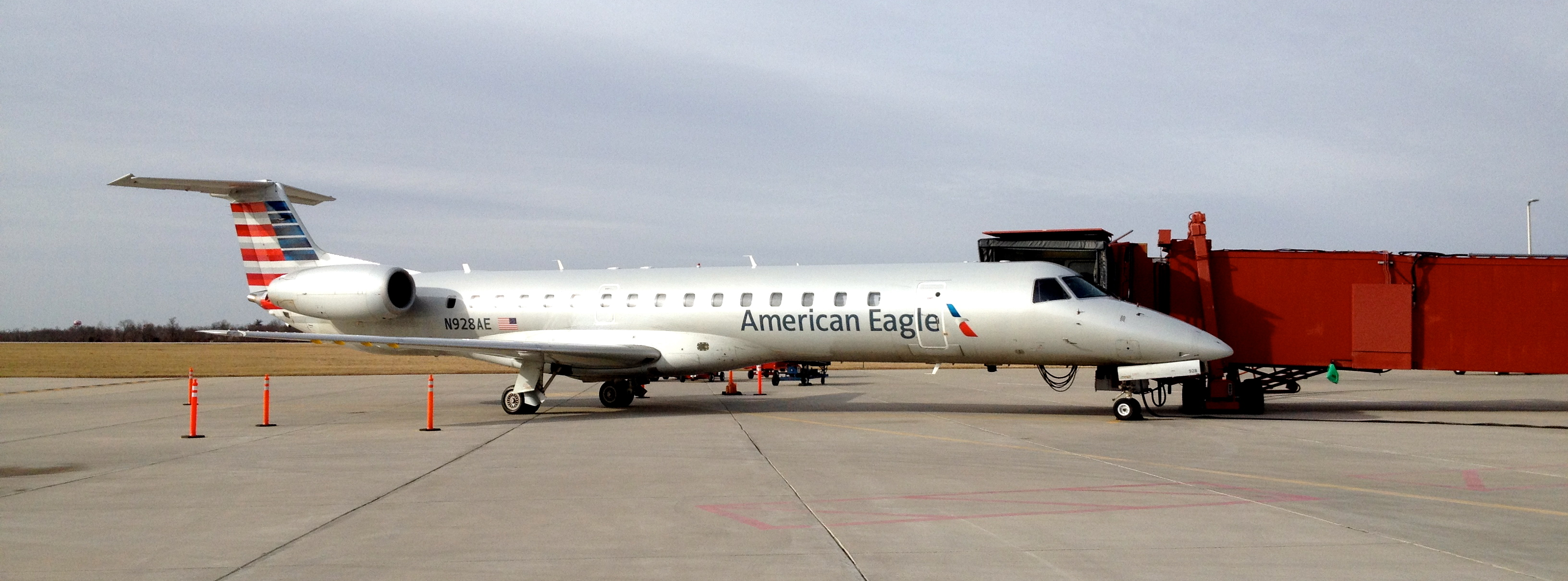
Embraer ERJ 145

As of June 2025, Piedmont Airlines fleet consists of the following aircraft:

Piedmont Airlines fleet
Aircraft	In service	Orders	Passengers				Notes
Aircraft	In service	Orders	F	Y+	Y	Total	Notes
Embraer ERJ 145	68	—	—	3	47	50	3 to come from long term storage
Embraer 175	—	45	12	20	44	76	Deliveries start in the beginning of 2028
Total	68	45					

=== Retired fleet ===
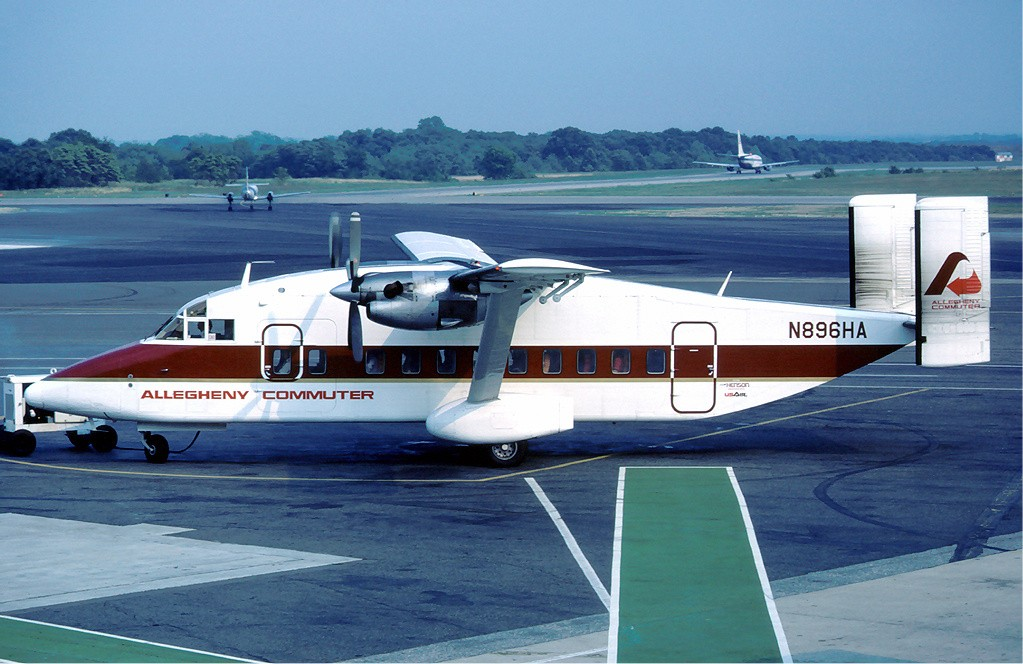
Allegheny Commuter Short 330 operated by Henson Airlines at BWI Airport in 1983

Piedmont Airlines retired fleet
Aircraft	Introduction	Retired	Replacement(s)	Notes
Beechcraft Model 99	1967	1987	Short 330	
Bombardier Q200	1996	2008		
Dash 7	1979	1997	Dash 8-300	
Dash 8-100	1993	2017	Embraer ERJ 145	Last flight was November 29, 2017.
Dash 8-300	2000	2018	Embraer ERJ 145	Last flight was July 4, 2018.
Short 330	1977	1989	Dash 8-100	

== Incidents and accidents ==
- On September 23, 1985, Henson Airlines Flight 1517, a Beechcraft Model B99 turboprop, crashed near Grottoes, Virginia. The crash was fatal to all 12 passengers and both crewmembers. This was the first fatality of a female commercial U.S. pilot, First Officer Zilda A. Spadaro-Wolan. The National Transportation Safety Board concluded that part of the probable cause of the crash was the airline's failure to standardize the cockpit configurations of its aircraft and on its failure to provide adequate training to its pilots.
- On November 16, 2008, US Airways Express Flight 4551, a Piedmont Airlines-operated Dash 8 turboprop, took off from Lehigh Valley International Airport at 8:20am heading to Philadelphia International Airport, had to make an emergency landing. The flight crew was indicated that the front nose gear hadn't come down and had to make a flyover for confirmation. Of 35 passengers and 3 crew, there were no injuries. The aircraft (N326EN) incurred only minor damage and was returned to service.
- On January 1, 2011, US Airways Express Flight 4352, a Piedmont Airlines-operated Dash 8-100 turboprop forced an evacuation of the U.S. Capitol and fighter jets were scrambled from Andrews Air Force Base after Flight 4352 suffered radio problems on approach to Washington, DC's Ronald Reagan Washington National Airport and strayed into restricted airspace. The Capitol was evacuated for approximately 20 minutes until the Dash 8 aircraft landed at Reagan National Airport.
- On January 7, 2011, US Airways Express Flight 4507, a Piedmont Airlines-operated Dash 8-100 turboprop from Philadelphia International Airport to Tweed New Haven Regional Airport in Connecticut was struck by lightning over the Long Island Sound. The captain reported electrical problems and diverted safely to Long Island MacArthur Airport due to more favorable weather conditions. The aircraft had 33 passengers aboard who were then bussed to New Haven.
- On May 18, 2013, US Airways Express Flight 4560 made a belly landing at Newark Liberty International Airport after landing gear would not extend. All passengers and crew members were evacuated safely.
- On December 31, 2022, a Piedmont Airlines ground worker was killed after being ingested into the engine of an Embraer 175 aircraft operated by Envoy Air at Montgomery Regional Airport in Montgomery, Alabama. The incident caused flights at Montgomery Airport to be temporarily grounded.

== See also ==
- Air transportation in the United States
- List of airlines of the United States
- List of airports in the United States
- Transportation in the United States
