= Richard A. Henson =

American test pilot, flight school operator

Richard Adams Henson
- Born: 1910; Hagerstown, Maryland
- Died: June 12, 2002 (aged 91–92); Salisbury, Maryland
- Education: Mountain Park Institute in North Carolina
- Known for: Henson Airlines
- Board member of: Richard A. Henson Foundation
- Parent(s): Frank and Ora Belle Henson
- Website: http://richardhensonfoundation.org

Richard Adams Henson (1910 – June 12, 2002) was an American test pilot, flight school operator, and founder of the modern "commuter airline" concept.

== Biography ==
Henson was a test pilot for Fairchild Aircraft Corporation during the Depression. He also flew for hire out of the Hagerstown Airport.

In 1932, he purchased the Blue Ridge Flying Service and renamed it Henson Flying Service.

Prior to World War II, Henson formed a Civilian Pilot Training Program flight school, training pilots in the Fairchild PT-19.

In 1962, Henson started the pioneering Hagerstown Commuter, a low cost, rapid turnaround airline servicing Washington, D.C., and Hagerstown. Henson started with Beechcraft Model 18 Twin engine aircraft.

In 1979, the need for increased hangar space for an ever enlarging fleet and room to construct training facilities instigated a move of Henson Aviation operations to Salisbury, Maryland, completed by 1981.

Henson partnered with Allegheny Airlines, creating one of the first code sharing arrangements with a major airline flying Beechcraft Model 99, and Shorts 330 aircraft.

Henson later partnered with Piedmont, creating "Henson, the Piedmont Regional Airline". This later was merged with US Air, the name Piedmont Airlines has been reapplied to commuter code sharing partners.

In 1984, Henson helped found the Community Foundation of the Eastern Shore, as one of the first board members.

In 1990, Henson founded the Richard A. Henson Foundation, Inc., a philanthropic organization dedicated to improving communities in and around Salisbury Maryland. Endowments included a multimillion-dollar gift to create the Richard A. Henson School of Science and Technology in 1988 and the Richard A. Henson Medical Simulation center in 2012.

Henson remained an active pilot until the age of 90.

== Honors ==
Hagerstown Regional Airport is named Richard A. Henson Field

The University of Maryland Eastern Shore in the town of Princess Anne, Maryland named its conference center located on the campus after Richard A. Henson.

The Richard A. Henson Cancer Institute is based out of the Peninsula Regional Medical Center in Salisbury, Maryland

Henson endowed the School of Science of Salisbury University in 1988 creating the Richard A. Henson School of Science and Technology.

Annually the Community Foundation of the Eastern Shore awards the Award of Excellence honoring Richard A. Henson in recognition of contributions to the community.

Henson Scout Reservation (Camp Nanticoke) is named in honor of Richard Henson.
