= Lancaster Airport (Pennsylvania) =

Airport in Lancaster County, Pennsylvania, United States

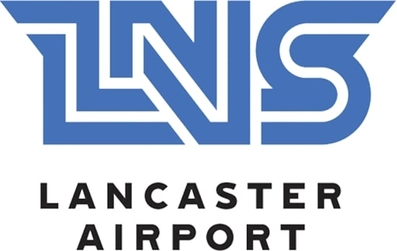

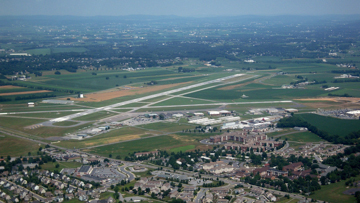
- Aerial view
- IATA: LNS; ICAO: KLNS; FAA LID: LNS

Summary
- Airport type: Public
- Owner: Lancaster Airport Authority
- Serves: Lancaster, Pennsylvania, U.S.
- Elevation AMSL: 403 ft (123 m)
- Coordinates: 40°07′20″N 076°17′40″W
- Website: lancasterairport.com

Maps
- FAA airport diagram as of January 2021
- Interactive map of Lancaster Airport

Runways
Direction	Length		Surface
Direction	ft	m	Surface
8/26	6,933	2,113	Asphalt
13/31	4,102	1,250	Asphalt

Statistics
- Aircraft operations (2020): 73,087
- Based aircraft (2022): 120
- Source: Federal Aviation Administration

Lancaster Airport (IATA: LNS, FAA LID: KLNS, TC LID: LNS) is a public use airport four nautical miles (5 mi, 7 km) north of the central business district of Lancaster, in Lancaster County, Pennsylvania, United States. It is owned by the Lancaster Airport Authority. It is served by one commuter airline subsidized by the Essential Air Service program and one charter airline.

The National Plan of Integrated Airport Systems for 2021–2025 categorized it as a general aviation airport based on enplanements in 2008 (less than 2,500 per year); however, it qualifies as a non-primary commercial service airport based on yearly enplanements in later years.

== History ==
The Lancaster Airport was formed over 75 years ago as a private airport. In 1933 the Lancaster Joint Aviation Committee was formed and the decision was made to operate a municipal airport. Using war relief funds and knowing that the airport would benefit local unemployed constructors, the Lancaster Joint Aviation Committee moved forward on modernizing the airport. They purchased 180 acres of farmland in southern Lititz and constructed the airport.

In 1936 Lancaster became the second airport in Pennsylvania with two hard surface runways, and was certified for both night and daytime operations.

After World War II the airport was becoming obsolete, so using government funds the airport was expanded and modernized, with 22% of the funds needed for the update being raised by the community.

On June 18, 1949 the airport was dedicated after upgrades were completed.

Over the years the airport continued to improve; the terminal was renovated and expanded in the mid-1990s. Most recently, runway 8/26 was expanded in length, bringing it to 6,934 feet long and 150 feet wide.

== Facilities and aircraft ==
Lancaster Airport covers an area of 850 acres (344 ha) at an elevation of 403 feet (123 m) above mean sea level. It has two asphalt paved runways: 8/26 is 6,933 by 150 feet (2,113 x 46 m) and 13/31 is 4,102 by 100 feet (1,250 x 30 m).

For the 12-month period ending December 31, 2020, the airport had 73,087 aircraft operations, an average of 200 per day: 91% general aviation, 6% air taxi and 3% military. In April 2022, there were 120 aircraft based at this airport: 99 single-engine, 9 multi-engine, 6 jet, 5 helicopter and 1 glider.

In addition to hosting general aviation aircraft, Lancaster Airport is host to a variety of businesses: flight schools, planes for charter, aircraft rides, helicopter rides, hot air balloon rides, aircraft maintenance shops, a restaurant and a gift shop. It serves the pilots who call Lancaster their home airport and the community.

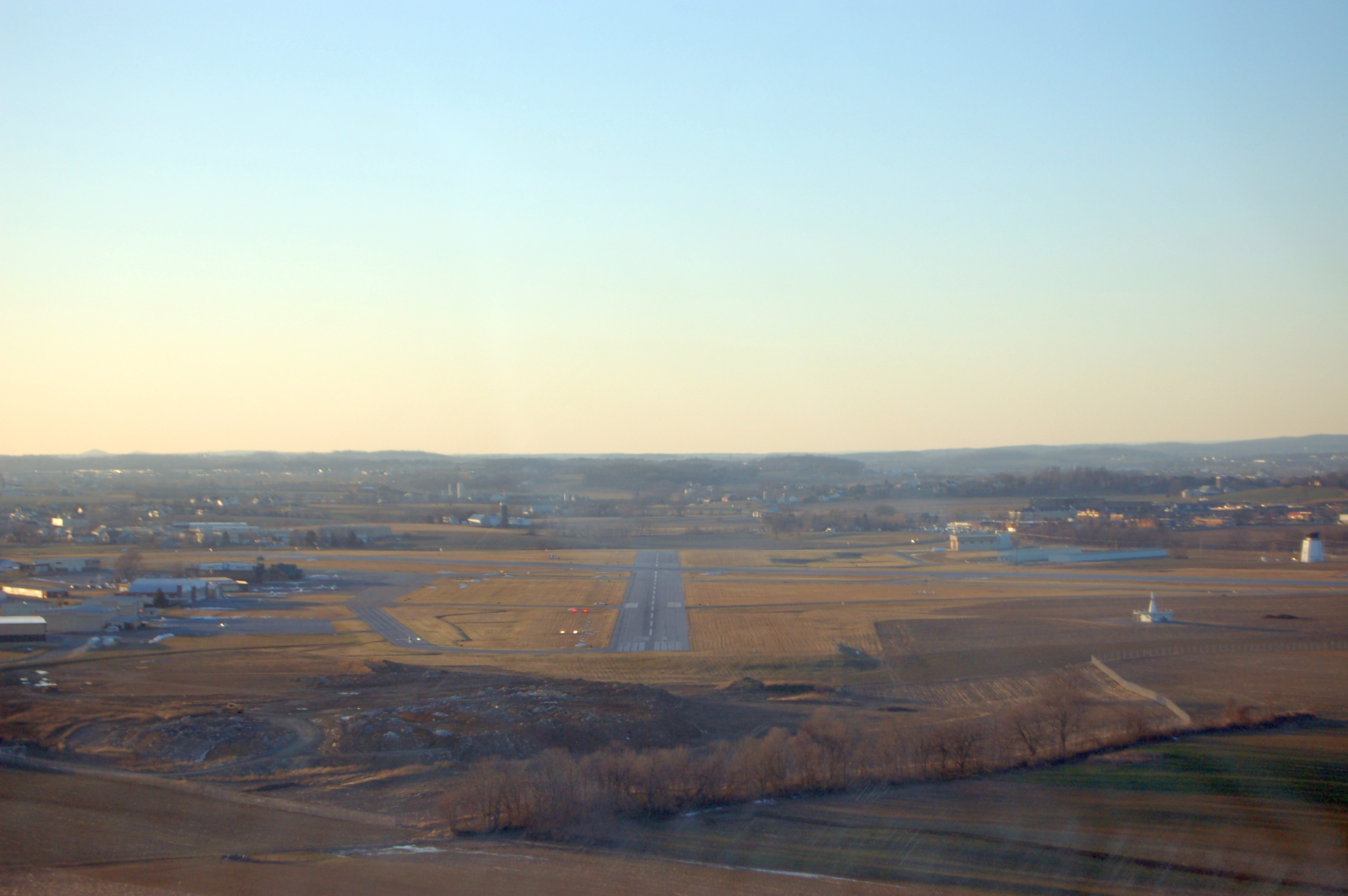
Looking down runway 31. The control tower and the VOR are on the right. The main hangars and terminal are at left. A single engine aircraft is on taxiway A (closest to the end of the runway).

=== Flight schools ===
- Aero-Tech Services, Inc.
- Bristell Flight school
- Flyabella
- Fly Advance

=== Charters ===
- Aero-Tech Services, Inc.
- Hi Tech Helicopters
- Red Rose tours
- Venture Jets, Inc.

=== Commercial Aviation ===
- Breeze Airways (four flights per week to Orlando (MCO))

=== Essential Air Service ===
Skywest D.B.A UnitedExpress daily flights to ORD

=== Aircraft maintenance ===
- Henry Weber Aircraft Dist.
- Lancaster Avionics, Inc.
- Sensenich Propeller Service
- AeroTech Services

=== Miscellaneous operations ===
- Fiorentino's Bar & Grill - restaurant with a runway and ramp view
- Rental cars - Avis, Budget, Enterprise and National

== Airlines and destinations ==
Airlines	Destinations
Breeze Airways	Orlando
United Express	Chicago–O'Hare, Washington–Dulles (begins March 2, 2027)

== Statistics ==
Top domestic destinations from LNS (July 2025 – June 2026)
Rank	City	Passengers	Carrier
1	Orlando, Florida	13,140	Breeze
2	Washington-Dulles, Virginia	2,550	Southern
3	Pittsburgh, Pennsylvania	1,900	Southern
4	Chicago–O'Hare, Illinois	1,130	United

Carrier Shares at LNS (July 2025 – June 2026)
Rank	Carrier	Passengers	Share
1	Breeze Airways	26,530	70.19%
2	Southern Airways Express	9,060	23.96%
3	SkyWest Airlines	2,210	5.85%

== Accidents & incidents ==
- On July 20, 2025, a Piper PA-46 Malibu crashed just after departing the Lancaster Airport. The sole pilot onboard was killed. The crash is under investigation.

== See also ==
- List of airports in Pennsylvania

== Other sources ==
- Essential Air Service documents (Docket OST-2002-11450) from the U.S. Department of Transportation:
  - Order 2004-5-20 (May 27, 2004): selecting Air Midwest to provide subsidized essential air service at Lancaster, Pennsylvania, for a two-year period beginning when the carrier implements its full service pattern. Service is to consist of three nonstop round trips to Pittsburgh each weekday and over each weekend period, with 19-seat Beech 1900D aircraft, at an annual subsidy of $1,611,707.
  - Order 2006-8-22 (August 25, 2006): selecting Mesa Air Group, Inc. d/b/a Air Midwest to provide subsidized essential air service (EAS) at Lancaster, Pennsylvania, with 19-passenger Beech 1900 aircraft, for one year, beginning October 1, 2006, through September 30, 2007. Air Midwest will provide three nonstop round trips to Pittsburgh each weekday and weekend (18 total round trips per week) at an annual subsidy rate of $1,377,257.
  - Order 2008-12-33 (December 31, 2008): selecting Hyannis Air Service, Inc. d/b/a Cape Air, to provide subsidized essential air service (EAS) at Hagerstown, Maryland, and Lancaster, Pennsylvania, beginning when the carrier inaugurates service, through September 30, 2009, at the annual subsidy rates of $1,203,167 for Hagerstown and $1,372,474 for Lancaster.
  - Order 2010-10-1 (October 1, 2010): extending the current subsidy contract of Cape Air to provide subsidized essential air service (EAS) at Hagerstown, Maryland, and Lancaster, Pennsylvania, through September 30, 2011.
  - Order 2012-2-13 (February 17, 2012): extending the contract of Hyannis Air Service, Inc. d/b/a Cape Air to provide subsidized Essential Air Service (EAS) at Hagerstown, Maryland, and Lancaster, Pennsylvania, until further notice; and requesting proposals from carriers interested in providing EAS at Hagerstown and/or Lancaster, through September 30, 2015, with or without subsidy.
  - Order 2012-8-9 (August 3, 2012): selecting Sun Air Express, LLC d/b/a Sun Air International, to provide subsidized Essential Air Service (EAS) with nine-passenger twin-engine Piper Chieftain aircraft at Hagerstown, Maryland, and Lancaster, Pennsylvania, through September 30, 2015.1 The annual subsidy rate for Hagerstown will be set at $1,785,638, and $2,504,174 for Lancaster, or a combined total of $4,289,812.
  - Order 2014-4-26 (April 24, 2014): directing interested persons to show cause as to why the Department should not terminate the eligibility ... under the Essential Air Service (EAS) program based on criteria passed by Congress in the FAA Modernization and Reform Act of 2012 (Public Law No. 112-95). We find that Lancaster is within 175 miles of a large or medium hub, Philadelphia International Airport (PHL), a large hub, and, thus, is subject to the 10-enplanement statutory criterion. We also find that during fiscal year 2013, Lancaster generated a total of 3,943 passengers (inbound plus outbound). Consistent with the methodology described above, that results in an average of 6.3 enplanements per day, below the 10-enplanement statutory criterion necessary to remain eligible in the EAS program.
