= Westfield Wheaton =

Shopping mall in Montgomery County, Maryland, U.S.

Coordinates: 39°02′10″N 77°03′14″W

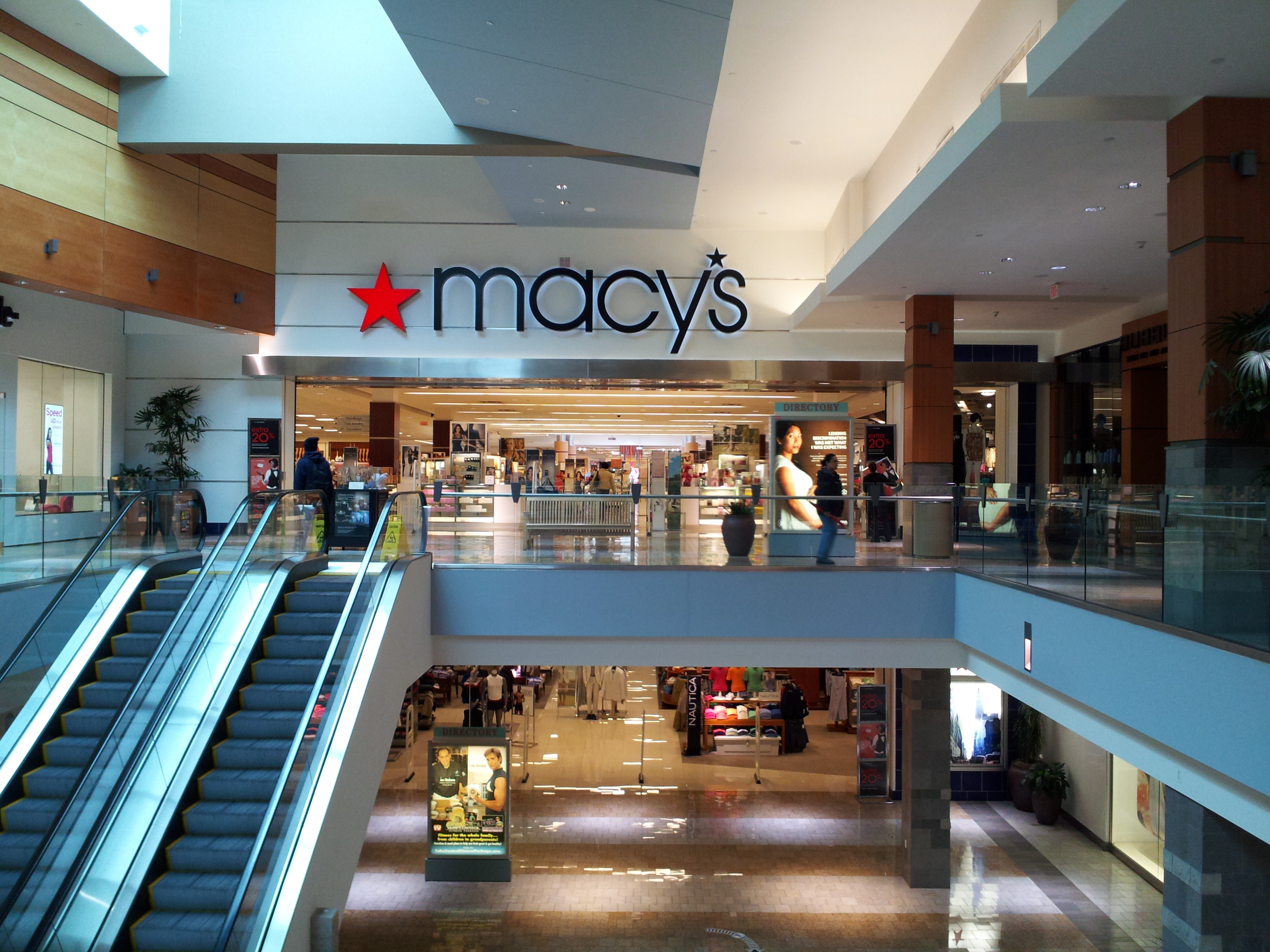
- Mall entrance to Macy's store, viewed from the upper level
- Location: Wheaton, Maryland, United States
- Address: 11160 Veirs Mill Road, Wheaton, Maryland 20902-1094
- Opened: February 5, 1960; 66 years ago
- Developer: Isadore M. Gudelsky; Ted Lerner
- Manager: Unibail-Rodamco-Westfield
- Owner: Unibail-Rodamco-Westfield
- Architect: Arthur L. Anderson; Lathrop Douglas
- Num. of stores: 183
- Num. of anchor tenants: 5
- Floor area: 1,506,947 sq ft (140,000.0 m^{2})
- Floors: 2 (4 in JCPenney)
- Parking: 6,481 parking spaces and 2 four-story parking garages
- Public transit: Washington Metro: at Wheaton; Ride On bus: 7, 8, 9, 31, 34, 37, 38, 40, 41, 48; Metrobus: M12, M20, M22
- Website: Official website

Westfield Wheaton, formerly known as Wheaton Plaza, is a 1,700,000 square feet (160,000 m^{2}), two-level indoor shopping mall in Wheaton, Maryland, north of Washington, D.C. It is owned and managed by Unibail-Rodamco-Westfield and its anchor stores include Macy's, Target, JCPenney, Dick's Sporting Goods, and Costco.

== History ==
On March 23, 1954, real estate developer Simon Sherman announced he had bought 80 acres (32 ha) of land in Wheaton from Charles Heitmuller for $800,000. Heitmuller was a farmer who sold fruit wholesale. At the time Sherman announced the purchase, Sherman would not disclose the plans for the site. Sherman later successfully petitioned to have the zoning for a portion of the land changed from residential to commercial zoning.

Simon Sherman announced plans for a shopping mall in Wheaton on February 9, 1955. The planned shopping mall would include 50 stores in eight buildings on 15 acres (6 hectares), and another 40 acres (10 hectares) of parking and access roads.

The Wheaton Plaza's official groundbreaking was held on January 21, 1956. Giant Foods became the first store to open on the site on September 17, 1956. A Shell service station opened on Veirs Mills Road in August 1957.

The developer applied for a zoning exception in order to allow a parking lot to be built on the land that had been zoned for residential use. The surrounding neighborhood advocated against the zoning exception, saying that the proposed five-foot fence surrounding the parking lot would be insufficient. Montgomery County approved the zoning exception on the condition that the developer only constructed entrances and exits on Veirs Mill Road and Kensington-Wheaton Road. Isadore M. Gudelsky and Theodore N. Lerner took over as the developers at the end of 1957.

On the day before it opened, the Woodward & Lothrop store was picketed because the tea room in its location in Chevy Chase refused service to African Americans.

Wheaton Plaza officially opened on February 5, 1960, as a single-level, open-air mall, with Woodward & Lothrop (now JCPenney) and Montgomery Ward (now Target) as anchors. Thirteen other stores also opened on the same date. Wheaton Plaza's grand opening celebration was held on March 31, 1960.

Wheaton Plaza was built in a modified Georgian architectural style with bubbles, globes, and hemispheres as part of the exterior design. It was decorated with Italian marble, exotic woods, and Florentine glass mosaic panels. There was a marble-tiled fountain that was sculpted by Barbara Chase-Riboud, art instructor from Yale University. The center pathway was an open-air plaza, lined with boxed evergreen trees.

At the time of its opening, Wheaton Plaza was the largest shopping center in the Washington Metropolitan Area and the sixth largest in the United States. 411,000 people visited Wheaton Plaza during its first week.

By March 1960, stores at Wheaton Plaza included Strosnider's Hardware, Dieners Carpets, Bank of Silver Spring, Lamp & Shade Center, Raleigh's Haberdasher, Baker Shoes, E. D. Edwards Shoe Store, Embassy Men's Wear, Hanover Shoes, Peoples Drug Store, Dolls and Dames, Miles Shoes, Happy Time Togs, Hahn Shoes, Variety Records, Fannie May Candy Store, Lerner Shops, National Shirt Shops, Vincent & Vincent, Webster Clothes, Winthrop Jewelers, Kay Jewelers, and Hot Shoppes. Unconventionally, the developers decided where tenants' stores needed to be located, rather than allow tenants to choose. Rents were relatively high.

Store owners in downtown Silver Spring considered Wheaton Plaza to be an economic threat. Developer Theodore N. Lerner said Wheaton Plaza "is the way the future's going to be—a suburban 'downtown' with a mall and free parking."

In May 1960, John F. Kennedy visited Wheaton Plaza during his presidential campaign. Eleanor Roosevelt spoke at a campaign rally for Kennedy in November 1960.

In 1962, construction started on Wheaton Plaza's second office building. At ten stories high, it was the largest office building in Montgomery County. Hechinger opened a store at Wheaton Plaza on December 13, 1963.

In 1964, the nation's first self-service post office opened in Wheaton Plaza. The post office had vending machines for stamps and envelopes, and scales for customers to use. It was located in a plywood shelter in the parking lot.

Wheaton Plaza remained the largest shopping center in the area until the Lerner-Gudelsky development Tysons Corner Center opened in 1968.

Wheaton Plaza was the site of the 1975 disappearance of the Lyon Sisters. Their case was not solved until 2015.

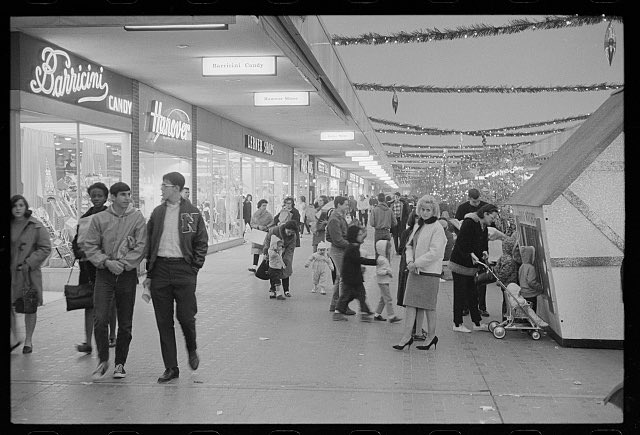
Wheaton Plaza in 1965

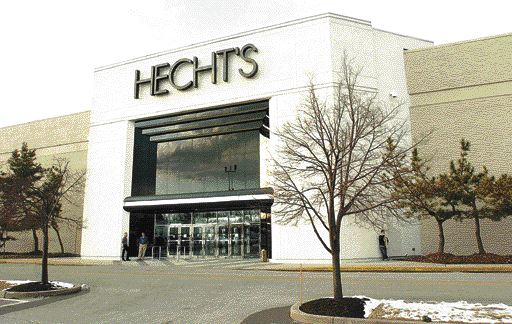
The old Hecht's department store

In 1974, a plan to enclose the mall was initiated. The seven-year delay to enclose the mall and anchor expansion by business partner Lerner, who also had interests in nearby White Flint Mall, caused a $30 million lawsuit between partners. A new wing, anchored by Hecht's, was built in 1987. Target replaced Montgomery Ward after the latter chain ceased operations.

In 2005, the service tunnel beneath the mall was converted to retail space. Macy's opened a new store, shortly before Macy's owner Federated Department Stores purchased Hecht's owner May Department Stores. The Hecht's store was closed after the May-Federated merger. Temporary anchor IFL Furniture took over the Hecht's location in 2006, and closed in March 2008. DSW Shoe Warehouse opened in the mall in November 2008.

In 2010, Costco announced that it would build a new store on the site of the vacant Hecht's; Costco opened in April 2013, in a new building that also contains a Dick's Sporting Goods.

In April 2025, it was revealed that the mall’s owner, Unibail-Rodamco-Westfield, had defaulted on a $235 million loan connected to the mall. The mall is currently one of URW’s last remaining “regional malls” in the United States.

In June 2025, URW confirmed their search for new owners or operators for the mall. Dominic Lowe, URW’s COO in the United States, confirmed the company’s intentions to “exit Wheaton at some point this year.”
