= Wor–Wic Community College =

Community college in Salisbury, Maryland, U.S.

Wor-Wic Community College
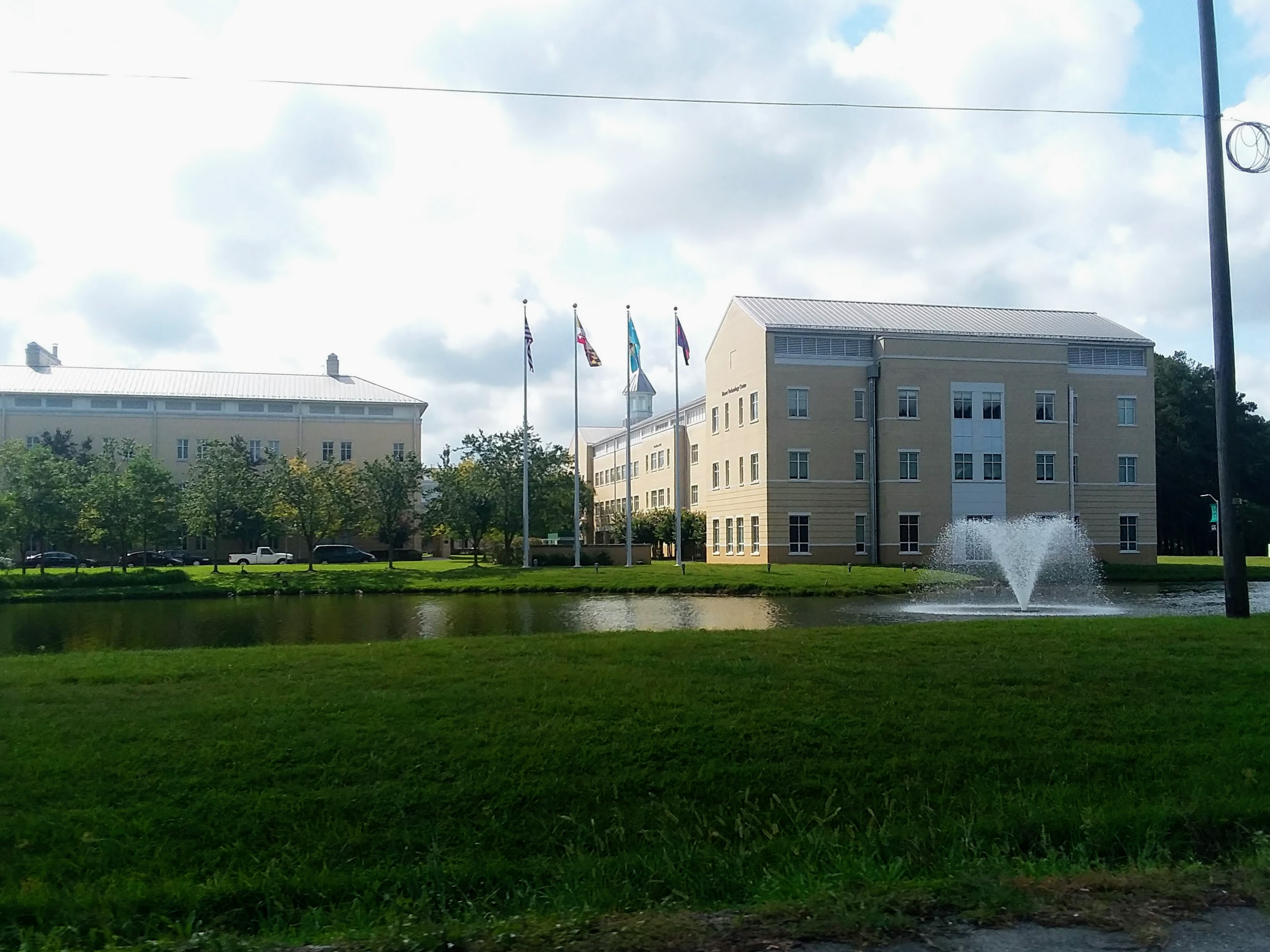
- Type: Public community college
- Established: 1975
- Affiliations: Middle States Commission on Higher Education
- President: Dr. Deborah Casey
- Students: 10,982 (credit & non-credit)
- Location: Salisbury, Maryland, United States; 38.3737°N 75.5033°W
- Campus: 200 acres (81 ha); Suburban
- Colors: Teal & White
- Mascot: Dolphin
- Website: www.worwic.edu

Wor–Wic Community College is a public community college in Salisbury, Maryland. The college's name is a portmanteau of Maryland's Worcester and Wicomico counties. It was founded in 1975 and operated as a "college without walls" in the two counties for 20 years before constructing a campus in Salisbury in 1994. In 1989, state legislation was enacted to allow Somerset County residents to attend Wor-Wic at the in-county tuition rate.

As of 2023 there were 4,486 students enrolled in credit courses and 6,496 students enrolled in non-credit courses. Wor-Wic is popular with students who plan on transferring to Salisbury University because of its proximity, inexpensive tuition, and the similarity of its general education courses to those of Salisbury University.

== Academics ==
Wor-Wic is accredited by the Middle States Association of Colleges and Schools. Its nursing programs are approved by the Maryland Board of Nursing. The radiologic technology program is nationally accredited by the Joint Review Committee on Education in Radiologic Technology.

== Facilities ==
Wor-Wic leases or owns various facilities which provide office, classroom, and laboratory space. In addition, Wor-Wic owns Ocean Resorts Golf Club which is used for their Turf Management and Hospitality courses. In 2023, Wor-Wic opened the new Patricia and Alan Guerrieri Technology Center, bringing "welding, HVACR, metal fabrication and plumbing labs; a CDL simulation lab; and other hands-on instruction areas for electro-mechanical, construction, electrical and alternative energy programs" on-campus.

== Tuition ==
As of the Fall 2023 semester, the tuition cost is $129 per credit hour for in-county residents, $258 per credit hour for other Maryland residents, and $323 per credit hour for out-of-state students.

== Governance ==
The Maryland Higher Education Commission oversees and coordinates higher education in the State of Maryland including academic and financial policies at the college. A seven-member Board of Trustees, appointed by the Governor of the State of Maryland, governs the college. The college also has local sponsors, including the Worcester County and Wicomico County governments.

== Notable alumni ==
- Matthew A. Maciarello - Maryland Circuit Court Judge
