= Salisbury Police Department (Maryland) =

Municipal police department in Maryland, U.S.

City of Salisbury Police Department Salisbury Police Department
- Salisbury Police patch
- Abbreviation: SPD

Jurisdictional structure
- Operations jurisdiction: Salisbury, Maryland, United States
- General nature: Local civilian police

Operational structure
- Headquarters: Salisbury, Maryland; 38°22′5″N 75°36′34″W
- Agency executive: David Meienschein, Chief of Police
- Units: Administration; Criminal Investigations; Operations

Website
- salisbury.md/departments/police

The Salisbury Police Department (SPD) is a nationally accredited full-service agency servicing a population of 33,050 persons within 14.28 square miles (37.0 km^{2}) of the municipality of Salisbury, in the U.S. state of Maryland.

The Chief of Police, since September 25, 2023, is David Meienschein. Chief Meienschein is eleventh chief of police for the Salisbury Police Department.

== History ==
SPD became accredited on April 26, 1987, becoming the 45th agency accredited by the Commission on Accreditation for Law Enforcement Agencies.

In 2011, the Salisbury Police Department partnered with the Community Foundation of the Eastern Shore to create two funds. The first is a College Scholarship program to send a future Salisbury Police Officer to Wor-Wic Community College. The second is a fund to re-establish the Mounted Unit and to assist in the establishment of a K-9 Unit.

In October 2014, three separate lawsuits were filed against the Salisbury Police Department, all accusing the same officer of using excessive force. In 2017, the ACLU sued the Salisbury Police Department to gain access to the settlement agreement for one of those suits.

A screenshot of police body camera video that shows the officer's hand on Colon's neck

On May 26, 2020, one day after the murder of George Floyd, an incident occurred in which an officer from the Department put his hand on the neck of 18-year-old Camren Colon, who was being detained for disorderly conduct. In response to bodycam video of the incident, Police Chief Barbara Duncan said "At no time... was my officer attempting to execute a neck restraint, a chokehold, or restrict the airflow of Mr. Colon." Lawyers representing the Colon family later disagreed, with one stating that the maneuver shown in bodycam video was "absolutely" a neck restraint. The use of neck restraints is prohibited by the Department's use of force policy.
