= The Center for Effective Philanthropy =

The Center for Effective Philanthropy, Inc.
- Formation: 2000
- Type: Non-profit research institute
- Tax ID no.: 04-3523528
- Location: Cambridge, Massachusetts
- Coordinates: 42.2225°N 71.0638°W
- Key people: Phil Buchanan; President
- Website: cep.org

The Center for Effective Philanthropy (CEP) is a nonprofit organization focused on the development of comparative data to enable higher-performing philanthropic funders.

CEP's mission is to provide data so that philanthropic funders can improve their effectiveness. CEP believes that the improved effectiveness of philanthropic funders can have a positive impact on nonprofit organizations and the people and communities they serve.

CEP pursues its mission through data collection that fuels:

- Research that looks into questions facing funders and their leaders. Drawing from comparative data, its objective is to provide funders with insights that they can apply to their work.
- Assessment Tools that are rooted in research and allow individual funders to gauge their performance. CEP offers tools that provide data for foundation leaders to optimize their organization's performance.
- Programming and Communications feeding CEP efforts to build leaders who can maximize the impact of philanthropic institutions.

== History ==
CEP received initial funding in 2001, produced its first publication in 2002, and conducted its first Grantee Perception Reports and Applicant Perception Reports in 2003. Since then, CEP has produced 34 research reports on foundation performance assessment, foundation strategy, foundation governance, and foundation-grantee relationships. More than 285 foundations, most of the largest in the United States, have used CEP's assessment tools, and many have implemented significant changes on the basis of what they have learned.

CEP has created data sets relevant to foundation leaders, surveying foundations' staffs, boards, grantees, stakeholders, donors, and even beneficiaries and applicants. CEP hosts programming focused on issues related to funder effectiveness.

CEP's work was reported on in a 2004 article in The New York Times, "Charities Surprise Donor Foundations with Bluntness" and The Chronicle of Philanthropy profiled CEP in their 2005 article "Giving Charities a Voice". In June 2009, The Chronicle of Philanthropy highlighted CEP's work with the Gates Foundation developing a survey for students attending Gates-funded high schools

CEP has a staff of 36 and has offices in Cambridge, Massachusetts, United States, and San Francisco, California, United States.

== Research ==
CEP's research projects delve into issues of funder effectiveness, examining common practice, and challenging conventional wisdom.

== Publications ==
- Working Well With Grantees: A Guide for Foundation Program Staff (July 2013)
- Foundation Transparency: What Nonprofits Want (May 2013)
- Employee Empowerment: The Key to Foundation Staff Satisfaction (December 2012)
- Room for Improvement: Foundations' Support of Nonprofit Performance Assessment (September 2012)
- Grantees' Limited Engagement With Foundations' Social Media (July 2012)
- The State of Foundation Performance Assessment: A Survey of Foundation CEOs (September 2011)
- Rhetoric versus Reality: A Strategic Disconnect at Community Foundations (September 2011)
- Can Feedback Fuel Change at Foundations? (May 2011)
- Grantees Report Back: Helpful Reporting and Evaluation Processes (January 2011)
- Lessons from the Field: From Understanding to Impact (December 2010)
- A Time of Need (June 2010)
- Working with Grantees: The Keys to Success and Five Program Officers Who Exemplify Them (May 2010)
- Essentials of Foundation Strategy (December 2009)
- The Stuart Foundation Striving for Transformative Change (December 2009)
- Aligning for Impact: Connecting the Dots – Insights from a Gathering of Foundation Executives and Trustees (September 2009)
- Becoming Strategic: The Evolution of the Flinn Foundation (March 2009)
- More Than Money: Making a Difference with Assistance Beyond the Grant (December 2008)
- Aiming for Excellence at the Wallace Foundation (June 2008)
- Improving the Grantee Experience at the David and Lucile Packard Foundation (January 2008)
- Beyond the Rhetoric: Foundation Strategy (October 2007)
- Assessment to Action: A Report on a Gathering of Foundation CEOs, Trustees, and Senior Executives (August 2007)
- CEP at 5: Comparative Data Enabling Higher-Performing Foundations (February 2007)
- In Search of Impact: Practices and Perceptions in Foundations' Provision of Program and Operating Grants to Nonprofits (December 2006)
- Foundation Communications: The Grantee Perspective (February 2006)
- Beyond Compliance: The Trustee Viewpoint on Effective Foundation Governance (November 2005)
- Higher Impact: Improving Foundation Performance: Insights from a Gathering of Foundation CEOs, Trustees, and Senior Executives (August 2005)
- Turning the Table on Assessment: The Grantee Perception Report (GPR) (June 2005)
- Listening to Grantees: What Nonprofits Value in Their Foundation Funders (April 2004)
- Assessing Performance at the Robert Wood Johnson Foundation (March 2004)
- Foundation Governance: The CEO Viewpoint (February 2004)
- Foundation Effectiveness: A Report on a Meeting of Foundation CEOs, Senior Executives, and Trustees (January 2004)
- Lessons Learned From a Gathering of Foundation Leaders (January 2003)
- Indicators of Effectiveness: Understanding and Improving Foundation Performance (August 2002)
- Toward a Common Language: Listening to Foundation CEOs and Other Experts Talk About Performance Measurement in Philanthropy (February 2002)
