= Coastal Hospice & Palliative Care =

Non-profit health care organization in Maryland, US

Coastal Hospice, Inc.
- Formation: July 1, 1980; 45 years ago
- Type: Non-Profit
- Tax ID no.: 52-1214775
- Location: Salisbury, Maryland
- Coordinates: 38.3728485°N 75.5535901°W
- Region served: Dorchester County, Maryland, Somerset County, Maryland, Wicomico County, Maryland, Worcester County, Maryland
- Board of directors: 15
- Key people: Michael P. Dunn (Chairman); Stephen R. Farrow (Vice Chairman); Byron Braniff (Secretary); Lorie L. Phillips (Treasurer) Alane K. Capen (President)
- Staff: 170+
- Volunteers: 250+
- Website: coastalhospice.org

Coastal Hospice and Palliative Care is a non-profit health care organization founded in 1980. It is located in Salisbury, Maryland, and serves Dorchester, Wicomico, Somerset and Worcester counties.

Its mission as a hospice is to serve the needs of the terminally ill in their own homes throughout the four Lower Shore counties. Coastal Hospice also provides palliative care, or medical care for managing pain and other symptoms of cancer. Coastal Hospice uses a team approach, sending registered nurses, counselors, home health aides, social workers, and volunteers to patients' homes.

== Coastal Hospice at the Lake ==
Coastal Hospice at the Lake opened in 2004. It is a 14-bed inpatient facility located within the Deer's Head Center. It is designed to give patients short-term care, usually less than five days, when a patient needs intensified medical care to treat symptoms that cannot be managed at home. The facility is also used for respite care, when a caregiver needs a break.

== Coastal Hospice at the Ocean ==
Recently renamed the Macky & Pam Stansell House of Coastal Hospice at the Ocean, the new facility is expected to open in fall 2018. The facility will be home for hospice patients who have no one to care for them in their own homes. It will also be a community outreach center focusing on palliative care, volunteers, grief support, and community education such as advance directives. Located at The Point in Ocean Pines.

== Coastal Hospice Thrift Shop ==
Coastal Hospice operates a thrift shop in Berlin, Maryland. Sales support Coastal Hospice at the Ocean.
