= Wings over Pittsburgh =

Air show in the United States

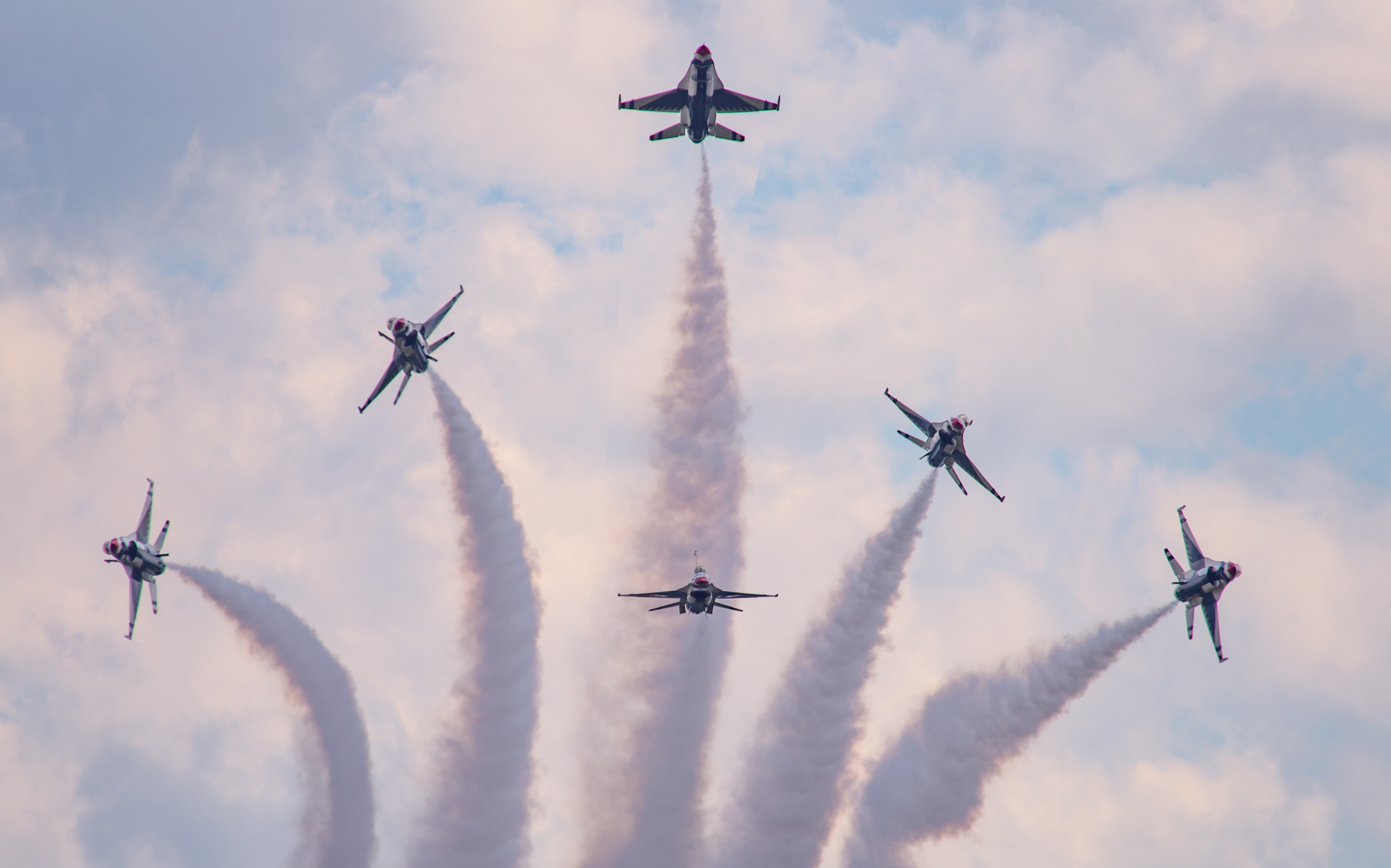
- Air show in 2017
- Status: Discontinued
- Genre: Air show
- Venue: Pittsburgh International Airport
- Locations: Pittsburgh, Pennsylvania, United States
- Coordinates: 40.4958°N 80.2413°W
- Years active: 2000–2017
- Attendance: 200,000 (2005)

Wings over Pittsburgh was an American air show which took place at Pittsburgh International Airport in Pittsburgh, Pennsylvania.

Inaugurated in June 2000, the air show was one of the largest on the East Coast. Over the years the show has seen many unique displays from aircraft from all over the world. Some notable static displays include: Boeing P-8 Poseidon, Boeing C-17, Boeing KC-46 Pegasus, Bell Boeing V-22 Osprey, Boeing C-40 Clipper, Gulfstream C-37, Gulfstream C-20, Lockheed C-130T, Lockheed Martin KC-130, Beechcraft T-6 Texan and Beechcraft T-44A. Also, the 60th College Training Detachment (Army Air Forces Training Command) provided military training at the airfield.

In recent years the air show has featured displays by the Blue Angels and the USAF Thunderbirds. Organizers have announced that future shows may feature commercial airliners, though specific aircraft types or participating airlines have not been disclosed. No further details have been provided.

Over the event’s nearly 20-year history, an estimated 1.5 million people have attended. The highest attendance was in 2005, with over 200,000 spectators.

== Gallery ==
Images from the 2017 Air Show:

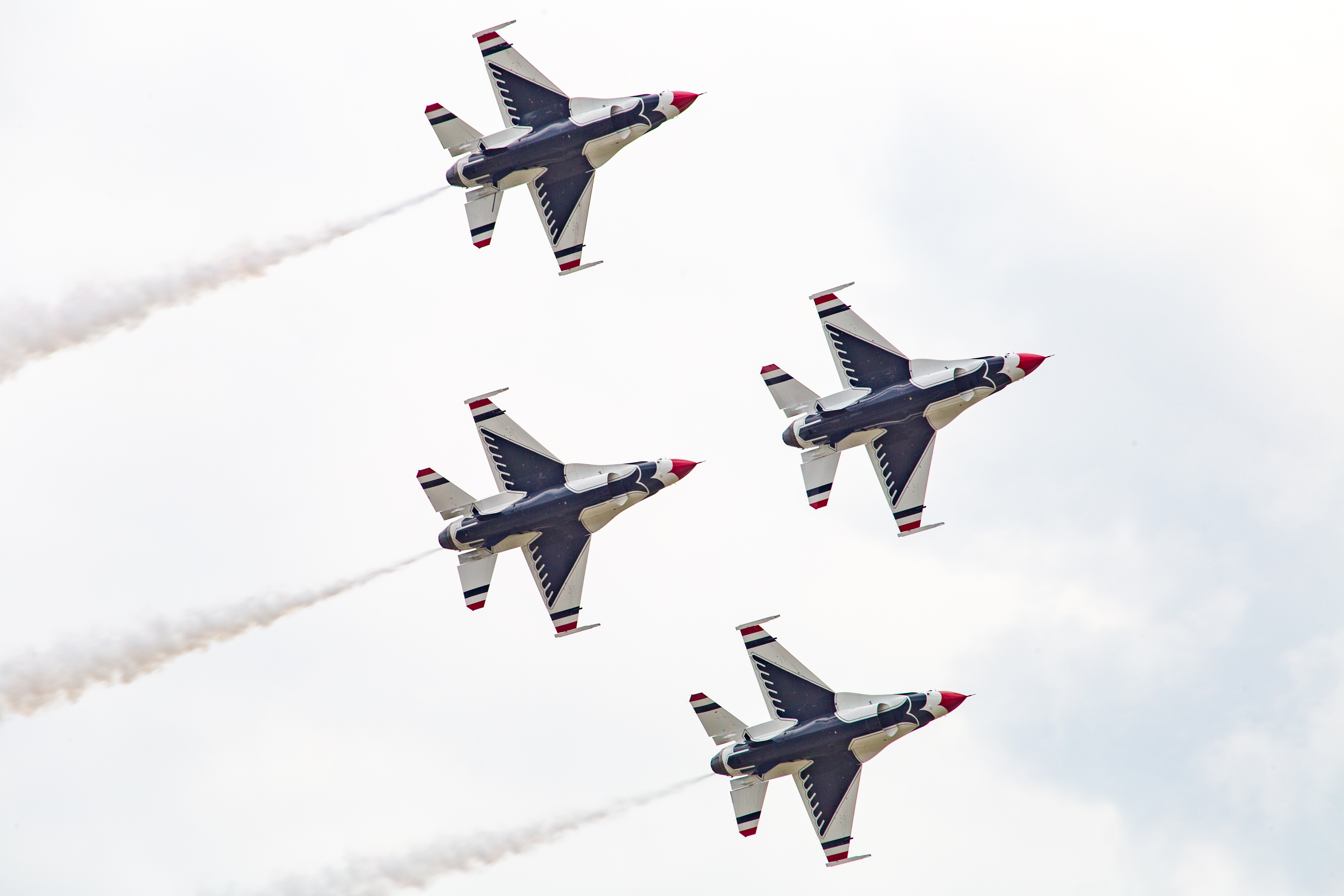
The US Air Force Thunderbirds

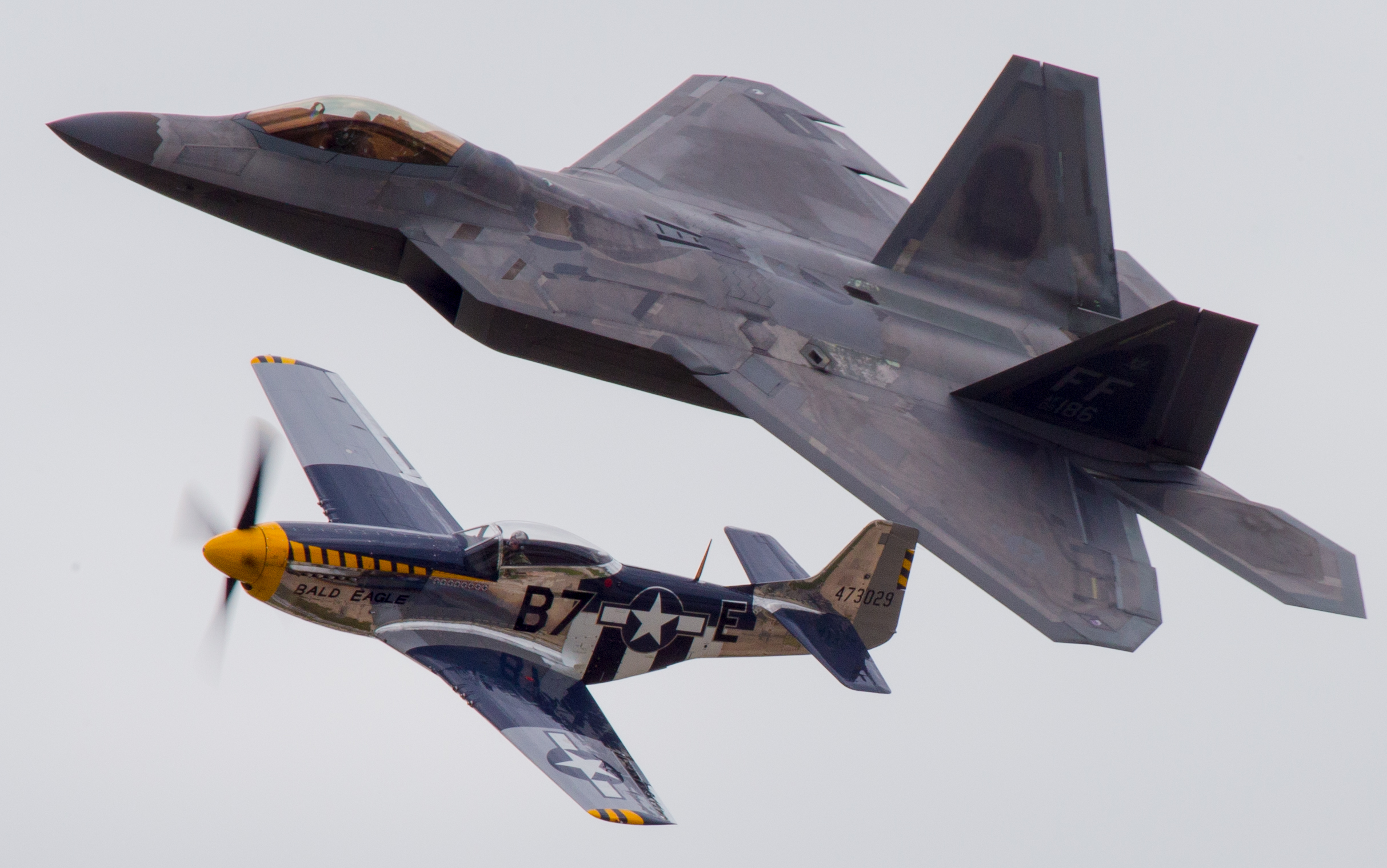
A Lockheed Martin F-22 Raptor and

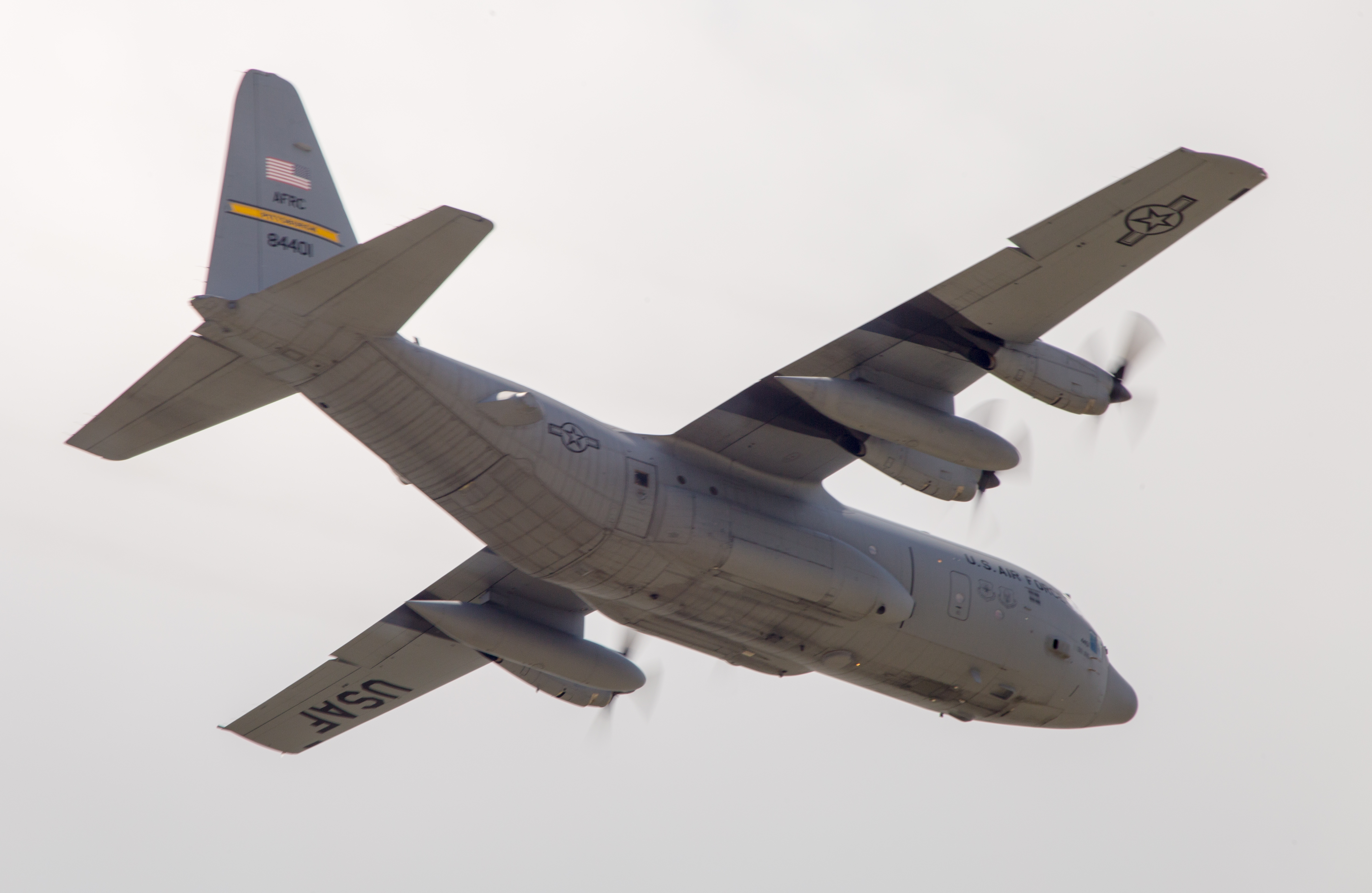
Lockheed C-130

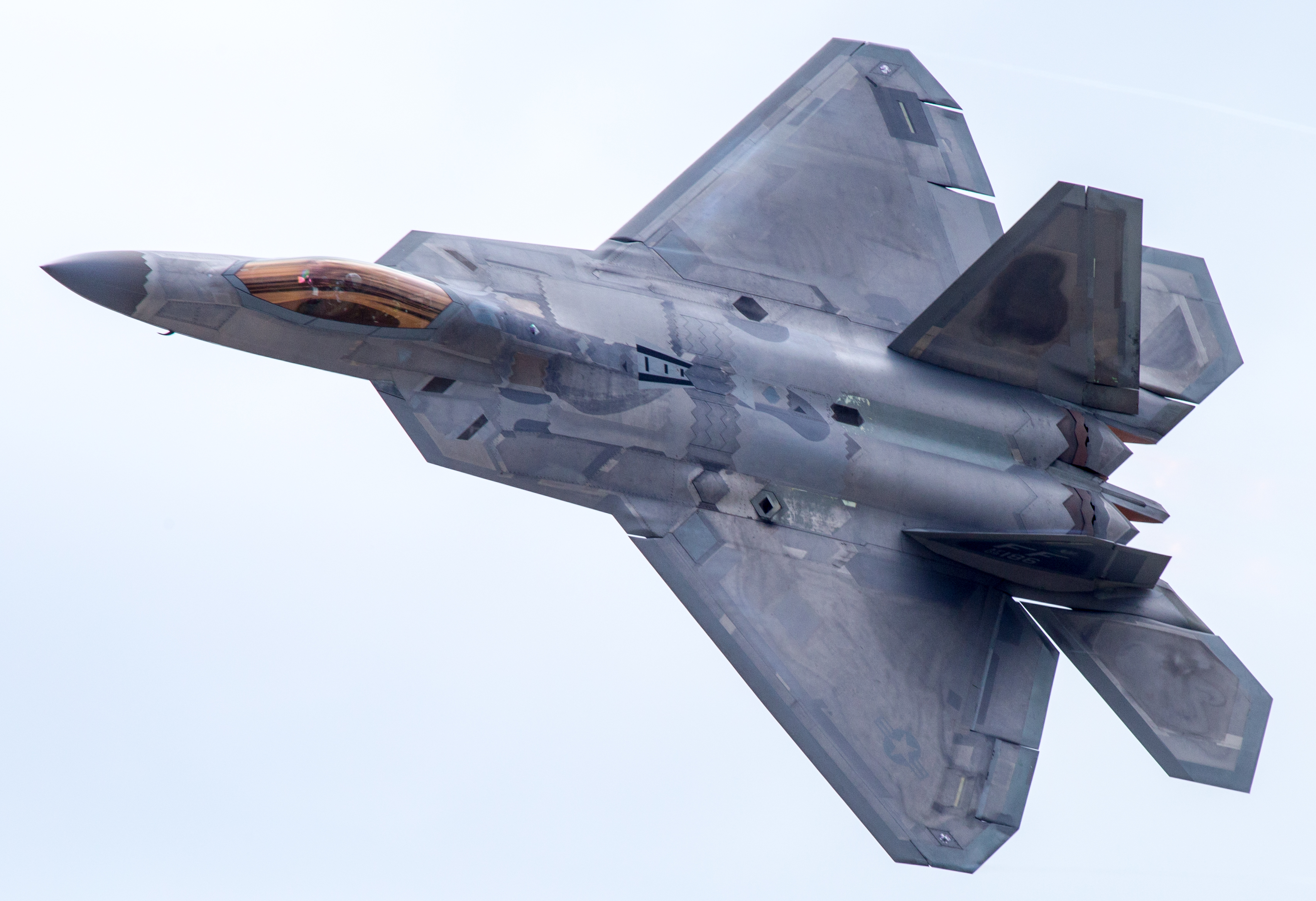
F-22

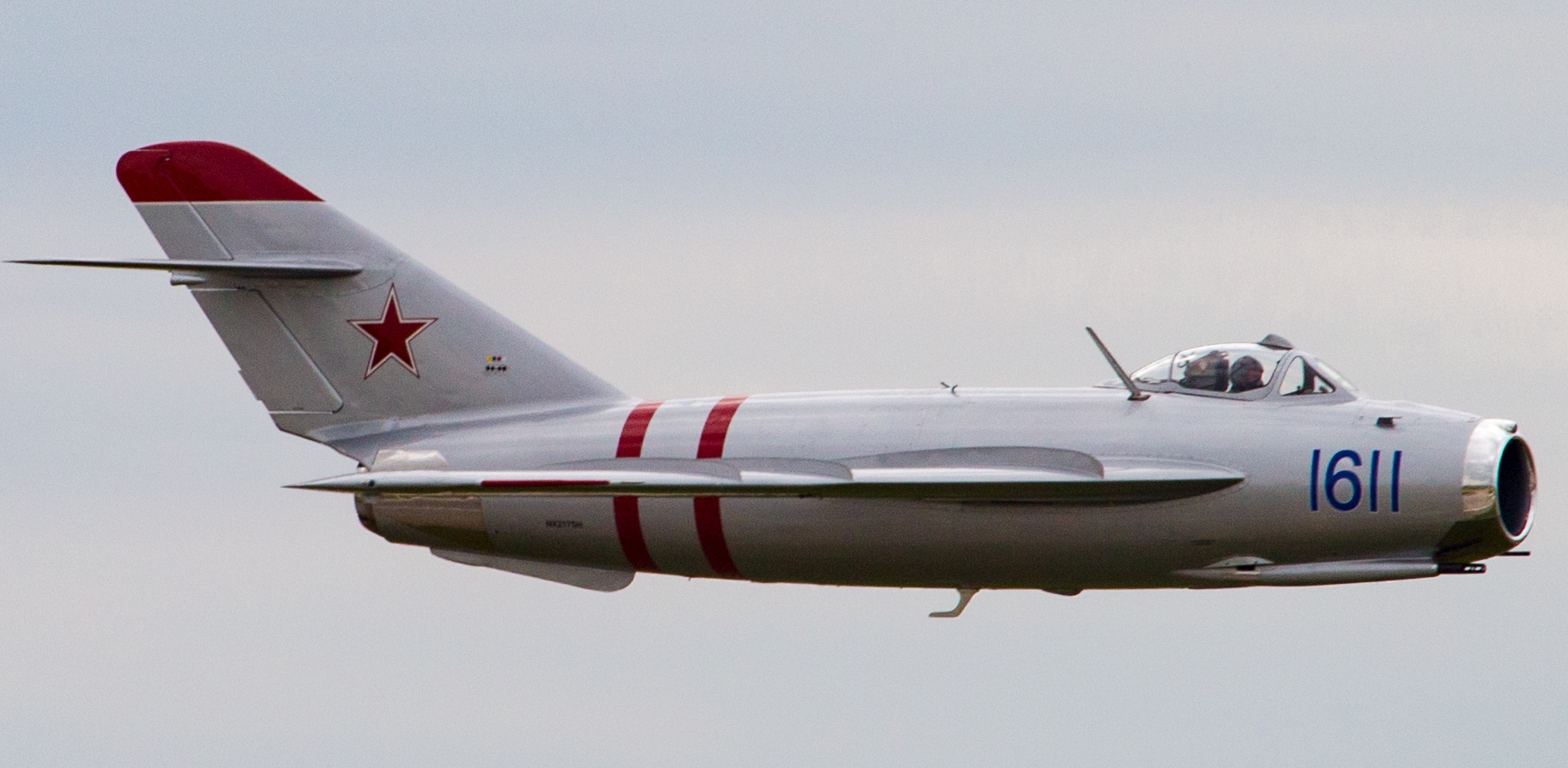
Mikoyan-Gurevich MiG-17

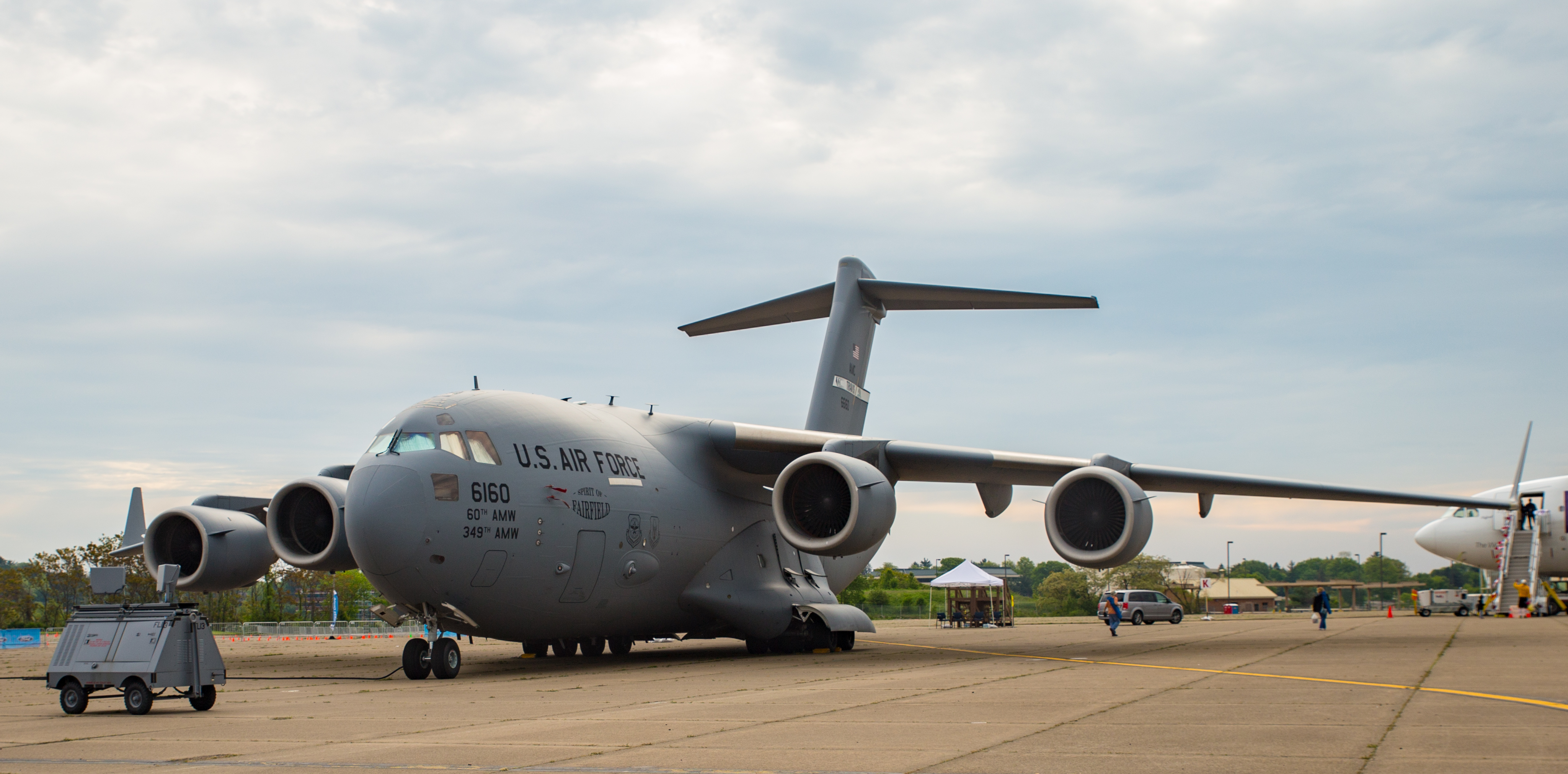
Boeing C-17 Globemaster III

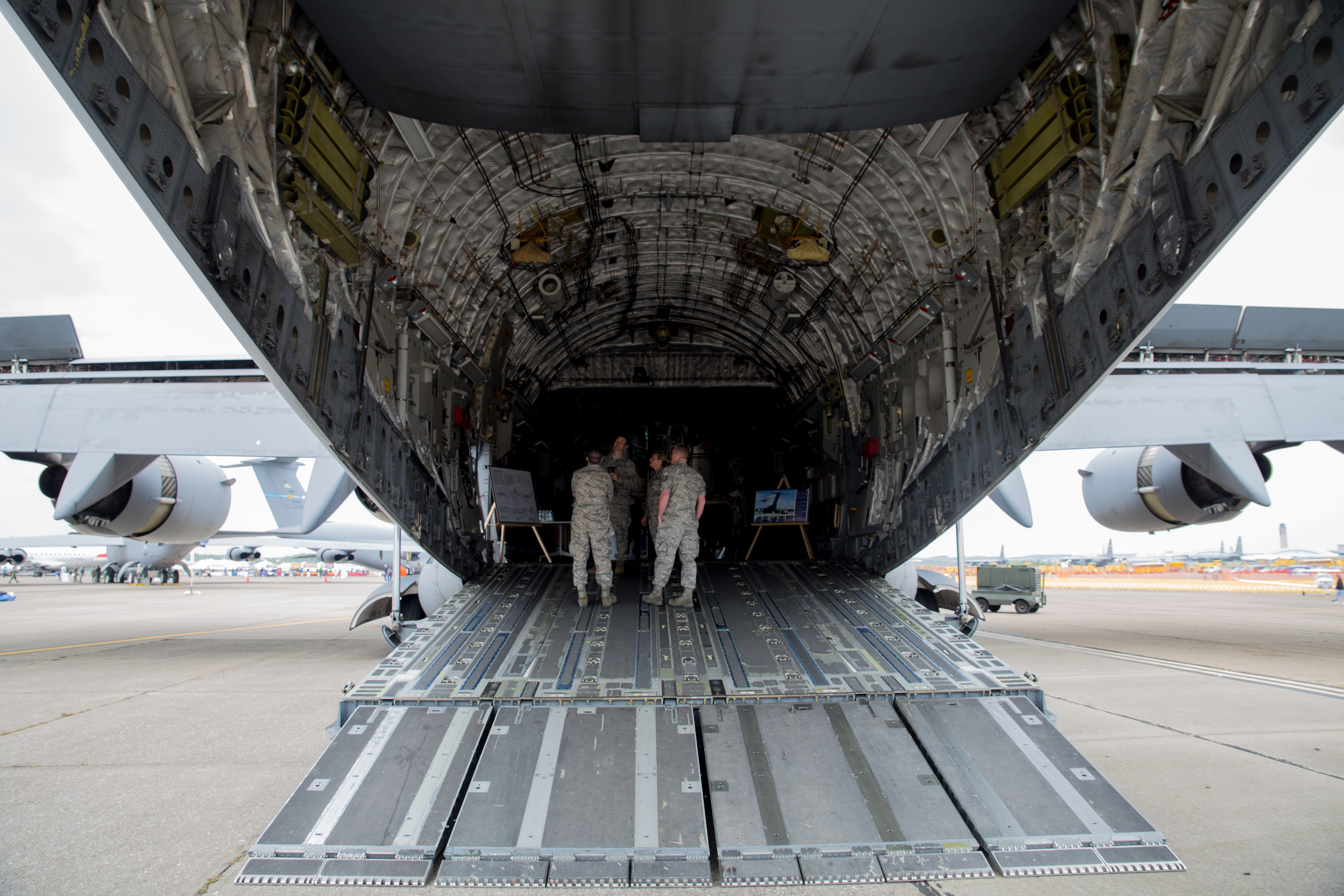
Boeing C-17 rear view

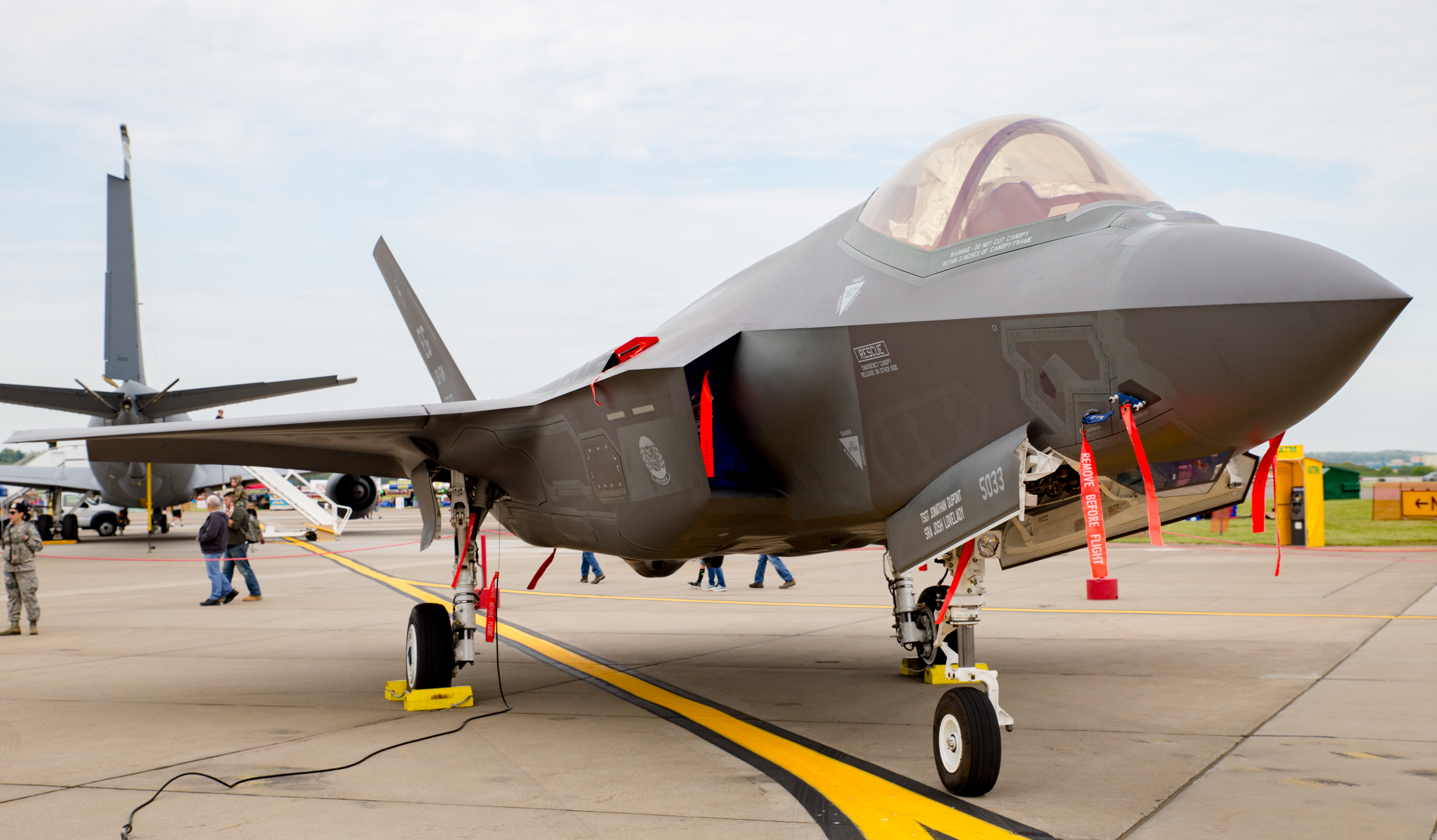

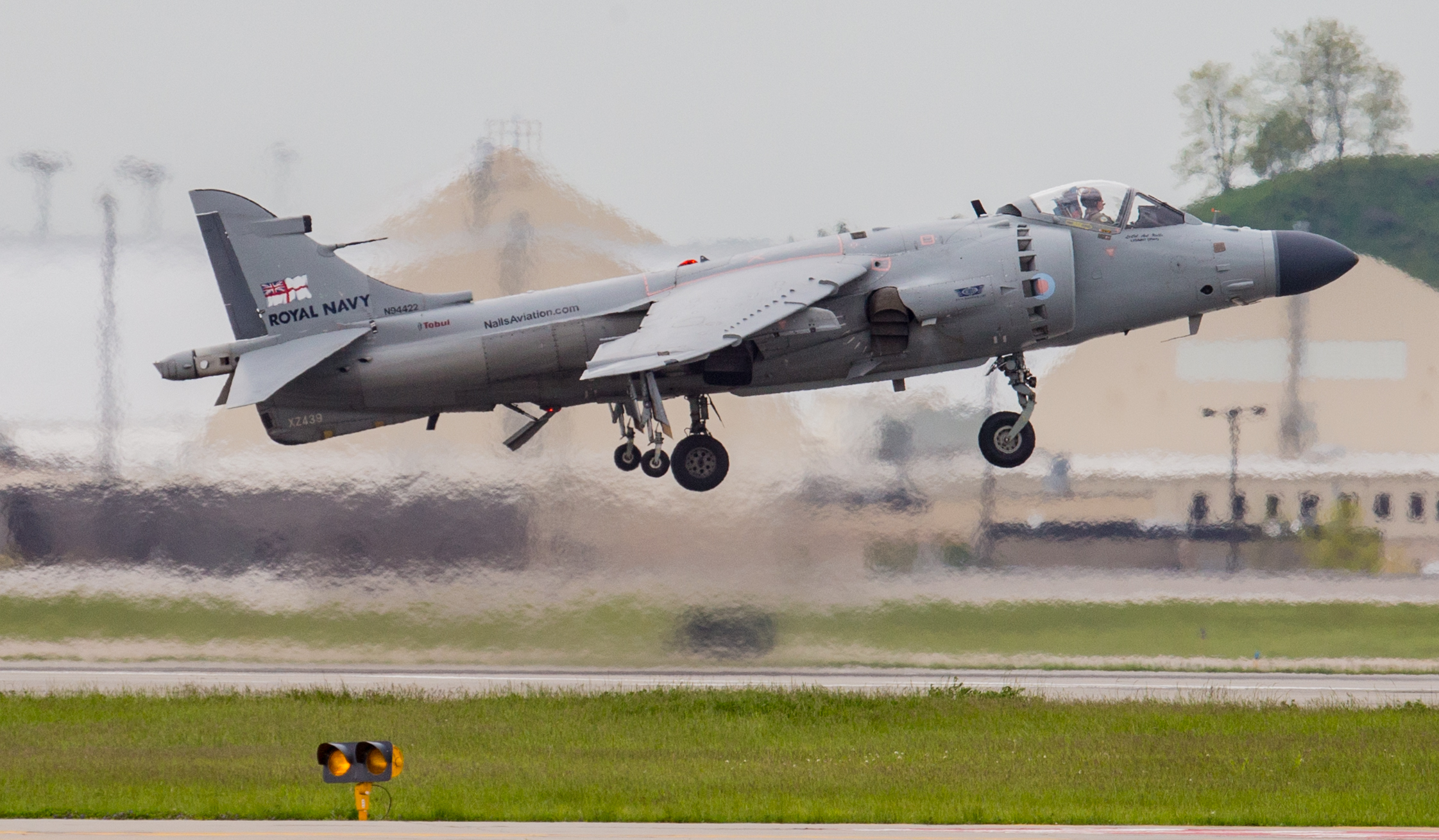

== See also ==
- List of Air shows
- Northeastern Pennsylvania Air Show
- Aviation in Pennsylvania
