= Flight 604 =

Flight 604 may refer to:

- Allegheny Airlines Flight 604, crashed 1965 in Pennsylvania after takeoff (engine failure, failures by flight crew)
- Ethiopian Airlines Flight 604, crashed 1988 at Bahar Dar airport (bird strike, double engine failure)
- Flash Airlines Flight 604, crashed 2004 in the Red Sea after takeoff
- Sonicblue Airways Flight 604, crashed 2006 near Vancouver (turbine blade fatigue failure)
