= KJST =

KJST may refer to:

- KJST, a defunct radio station licensed to Joshua Tree, California, United States
- KJST-LD, a low-power television station (channel 11, virtual 28) licensed to McAllen, Texas, United States
- the ICAO code for Johnstown-Cambria County Airport
