= Aviation in Pennsylvania =

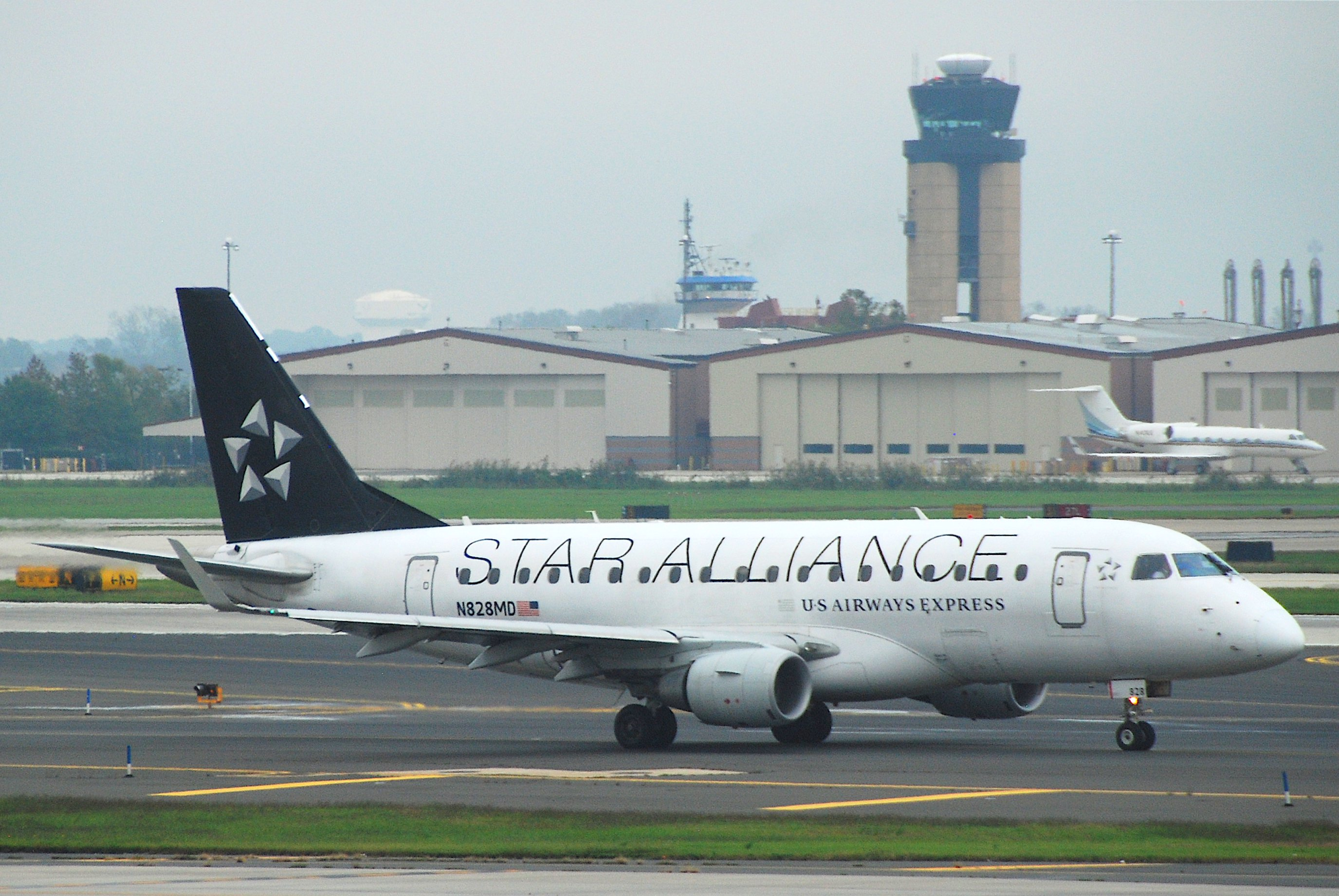
A US Airways (now merged with American Airlines) Embraer E170 at Philadelphia International Airport, one of the airline's main hubs

Aviation in Pennsylvania dates back over 100 years. Pennsylvania ranks 11th in the country in the number of public-use aviation facilities with 122 airports, heliports, and seaplane bases. The 122 public-use facilities provide an annual economic impact of $23.6 billion to the state. The aviation industry also supports more than 300,000 jobs making it one of the largest employment sectors in the state.

The state has multiple major international airports that connect the state and surrounding areas. Philadelphia International Airport and Pittsburgh International Airport account for a majority of passenger numbers, including about three million international travelers to Europe and the Middle East.

== History ==
Aviation in the Commonwealth of Pennsylvania dates back over 100 years. The state has been at the forefront of aviation development and growth. In the early 1900s, the state was home to substantial growth.

=== Industry beginnings ===
After the Wright brothers' first flight in 1903, the opportunity of flight raced across the nation. Inventors began working on designs for their own flying machines and held public air shows to show them off. Many of the state's airports were founded in the 1910s and 1920s, and the aviation industry was brought forward.

=== Piper Aviation ===
The Piper Aircraft Corporation was formed in the 1930s when William T. Piper purchased the Taylor Aircraft Company, rebranded, and relocated operations to Lock Haven. Piper Aircraft became world-renowned for its production of the J-3 Cub and as the leading producer of general aviation aircraft at the time.

=== WWII ===
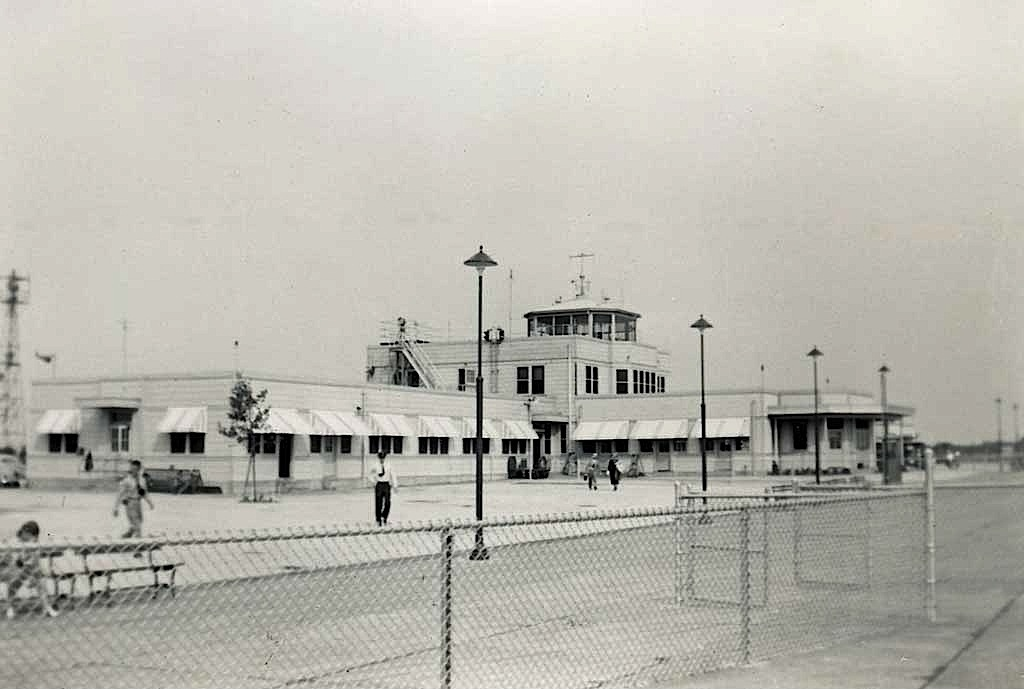
Philadelphia Airport in the 1940s

During World War II, Pennsylvania was designated by the United States Army and United States Air Force as training skies for bomber and fighter pilots before deployment to Europe or Asia. These bases include Fort Indiantown Gap, Pittsburgh Air Reserve Station and Harrisburg International Airport. The Air Force also built bombers throughout the state.

=== Modern commercial aviation ===
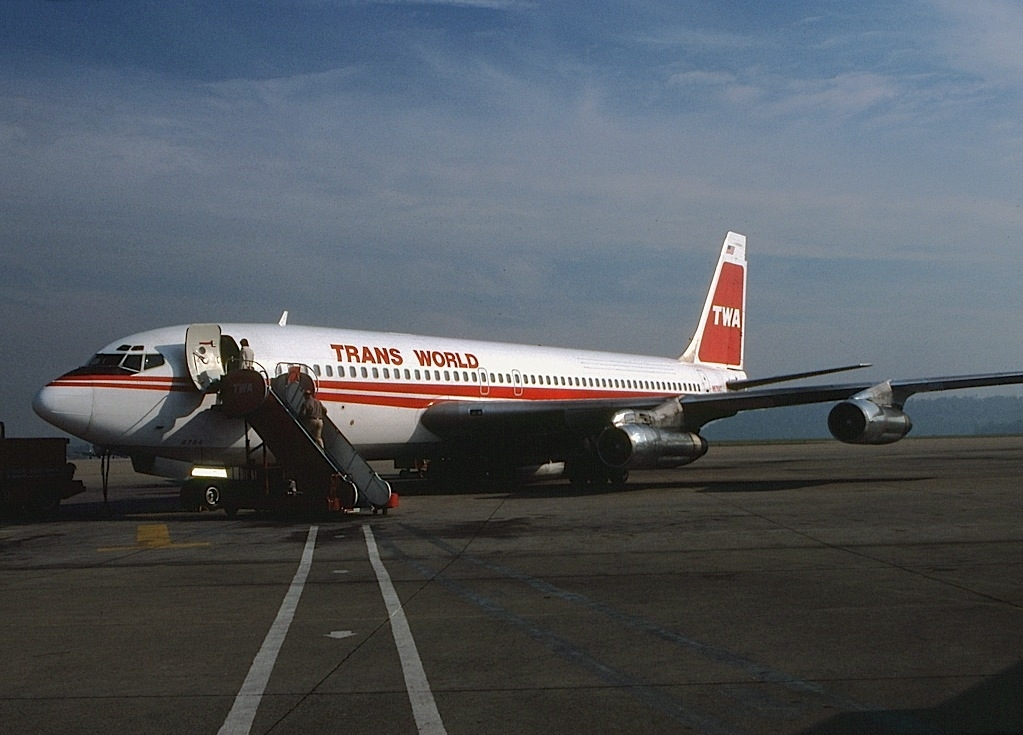
TWA Boeing 707 at Harrisburg Airport, the state's 3rd largest airport

As jet travel became more popular, airline choices expanded as well. The state's airports saw record numbers during the 1960s and 1970s, especially at Philadelphia International Airport, the largest and the gateway to Europe, and Pittsburgh International Airport, a then-hub for US Airways and a primarily domestic airport with some flights to Canada and Latin America. All airports saw a dramatic rise in flights and passengers in the 1970s, 1980s, and 1990s; however, after the September 11th attacks, Pennsylvania's airports, much like the rest of the country, saw huge declines in passenger numbers. This caused airlines to withdraw, such as British Airways in Pittsburgh and KLM at Philadelphia's airport.

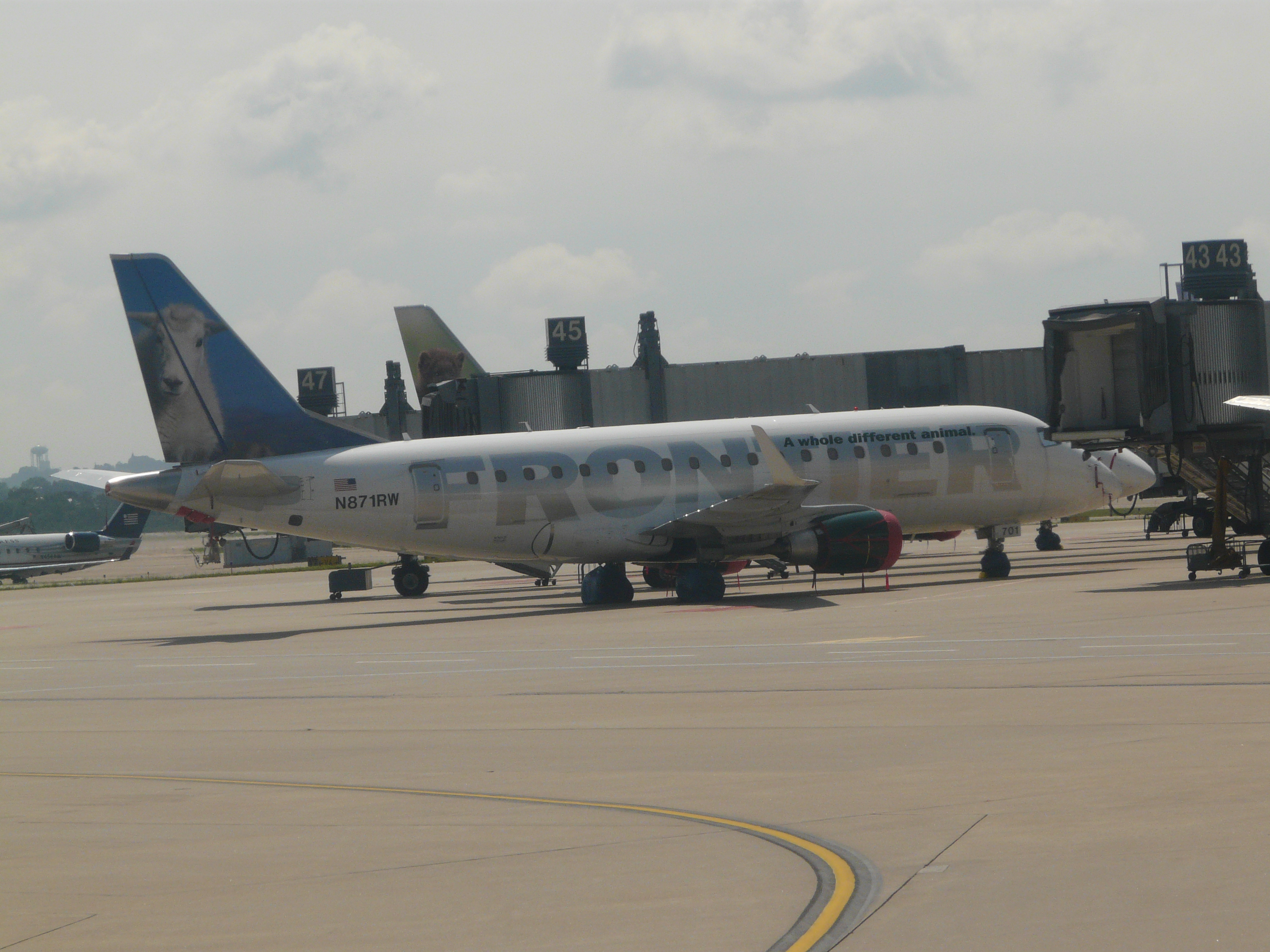
Frontier Airlines and other low-cost airlines are dominating the market in Pennsylvania's airports

=== Continued growth and industry expansion ===
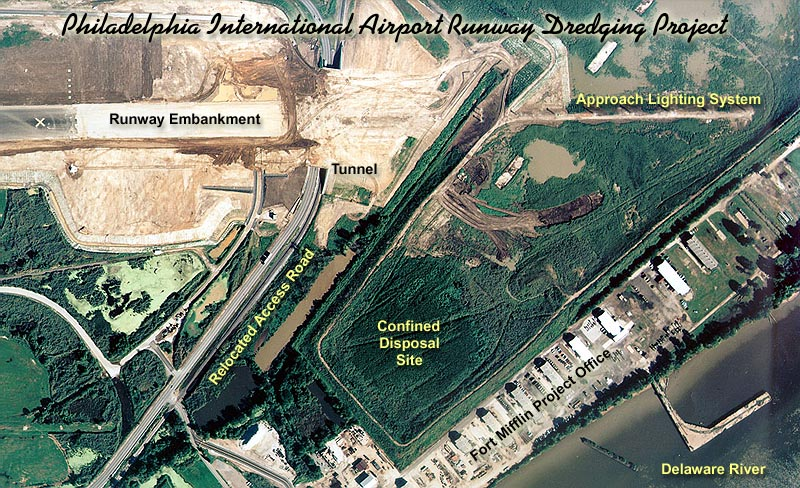
Expansion of Runway 8/26 at Philadelphia Int'l

Many airports in the commonwealth have seen recent growth. In turn, facilities and infrastructure is being updated or constructed. Since 2011 the FAA along with local, state, and Federal governments allotted almost $1 billion to aviation infrastructure at the state's airports, most predominantly at Philadelphia International Airport, Wilkes-Barre/Scranton International Airport and Williamsport Regional Airport.

== Major airports ==
Major airports in Pennsylvania with over 25,000 reported passengers.

Airport	City	Passengers	Aircraft movements
Philadelphia International Airport	Philadelphia	31,444,403	411,368
Pittsburgh International Airport	Pittsburgh	8,309,754	144,563
Harrisburg International Airport	Harrisburg	1,173,938	47,289
Lehigh Valley International Airport	Allentown	638,000	77,978
Wilkes-Barre/Scranton International Airport	Wilkes-Barre / Scranton	469,000	49,863
State College Regional Airport	State College	379,100	33,660
Arnold Palmer Regional Airport	Latrobe	287,000	28,816
Erie International Airport	Erie	88,953	N/A
Williamsport Regional Airport	Williamsport	25,119	33,019
		42,436,167	792,896

== Notable aviation companies ==
The following are notable aviation manufacturers, suppliers, and airlines based in Pennsylvania.

- Air East — commuter airline
- Altair Airlines — now defunct airline
- Boeing Rotorcraft Systems — headquarters and main factory near Philadelphia
- Lycoming Engines — aircraft engine manufacturer
- Piper Aircraft Corporation — aircraft manufacturer since relocated to Florida
- Sawdust Airlines — airline
- USA3000 Airlines — now defunct airline

== Airliner accidents within Pennsylvania ==
Click on the flight number for the accident page.

Date	Flight Number	Airline	Fatalities	Survivors	Location	Summary
April 7, 1936	1	TWA	12	2	Wharton Township	Pilot error
March 25, 1937	15A	TWA	13	0	Upper St. Clair Township	Icing causing loss of control.
July 11, 1946	513	TWA	5	1	Bern Township	In-flight fire
June 17, 1948	624	United Airlines	43	0	Conyngham Township	Crew incapacitated after activating fire extinguisher in response to false fire alarm.
January 14, 1951	83	National Airlines	7	21	Philadelphia International Airport, Philadelphia	Runway overrun in poor weather.
April 1, 1956	400	TWA	22	14	Moon Township	Mechanical failure followed by pilot error.
December 1, 1959	371	Allegheny Airlines	25	1	South Williamsport	Crashed into Bald Eagle Mountain in adverse weather conditions due to an instrument failure.
July 23, 1965	604	Allegheny Airlines	0	40	Near Williamsport	Crashed shortly after takeoff due to the pilots improper response to an engine failure.
June 23, 1967	40	Mohawk Airlines	34	0	Blossburg	Mechanical failure causing; structural fire then loss of control.
December 24, 1968	736	Allegheny Airlines	20	27	Bradford	Pilot error; a controlled flight into terrain.
January 6, 1969	737	Allegheny Airlines	11	17	Lafayette Township	Pilot error; a controlled flight into terrain.
January 6, 1974	317	Air East	12	5	Richland Township	Failure to maintain flying speed; Improper IFR operation; Premature descent below safe approach slope.
September 8, 1994	427	USAir	132	0	Hopewell Township	Rudder hardover due to design flaw.
May 21, 2000	N16EJ	East Coast Aviation Services	19	0	Wilkes-Barre	Fuel exhaustion due to pilot error.
September 11, 2001	93	United Airlines	44	0	Stonycreek Township	Terrorist hijacking
April 17, 2018	1380	Southwest Airlines	1	148	Over Pennsylvania; landed at Philadelphia International Airport	Engine failure followed by decompression.
January 31, 2025	056	Jet Rescue Air Ambulance	8	0	Castor Gardens, Philadelphia	Crashed shortly after takeoff, under investigation.
