= Air East =

Commuter airline in the United States

| IATA | ICAO | Call sign |
|---|---|---|
| – | – | – |
- Founded: 1967; 59 years ago
- Ceased operations: 1974; 52 years ago
- Hubs: Johnstown–Cambria County Airport
- Headquarters: Johnstown, Pennsylvania, United States

Air East was a commuter airline based at Johnstown–Cambria County Airport, Johnstown, Pennsylvania.

== History ==
It was established in 1967. On April 26, 1970, Air East inaugurated six daily passenger flights under the Allegheny Commuter brand. In 1974, Air East's commercial certificate was revoked by the FAA.

The Johnstown, Pennsylvania-based Air East appears to be unrelated to the family run airline that operated out of Farmingdale, New York under "Air East" brand from 1982 through the end of 2011, when it merged with Ventura, an airline that remains in operation as of July, 2016.

Yet another commuter airline using the name "Air East" was operating flights between New Orleans and Lafayette, LA in 1970.

== Fleet ==
The airline operated Beechcraft Model 99, British Aerospace Jetstream 31 commuter turboprop aircraft.

== Accidents and incidents ==
- On January 6, 1974, an Air East Beechcraft 99A crashed short of the runway at Johnstown, Pennsylvania after it failed to maintain flying speed and made a premature descent below the safe approach slope for reasons undetermined. Of the 15 passengers and two crew members on board, 11 passengers and one crew member were killed. The National Transportation Safety Board released its findings regarding the crash on January 15, 1975. It concluded the probably cause was "A premature descent below a safe approach slope followed by a stall and loss of aircraft control. The reason for the premature descent could not be determined, but it was probably the result of: (1) A deliberate descent below the published minimum descent altitude to establish reference with the approach lights and make the landing, (2) a visual impairment or optical illusion created by the runway/approach lighting systems, and (3) downdrafts near the approach end of the runway.".
- On March 7, 1974 the Federal Aviation Administration revoked Air East, Inc.'s operator's certificate stating "By reason of numerous violations, unsafe practices, policies, and coercing tactics... Air East, Inc., has demonstrated that it does not possess the judgement, responsibility or compliance disposition required of a holder of an air taxi commercial operators certificate."

== See also ==
- List of defunct airlines of the United States
