= 258th Air Traffic Control Squadron =

Military unit in Pennsylvania

258th Combat Airfield Operations Squadron
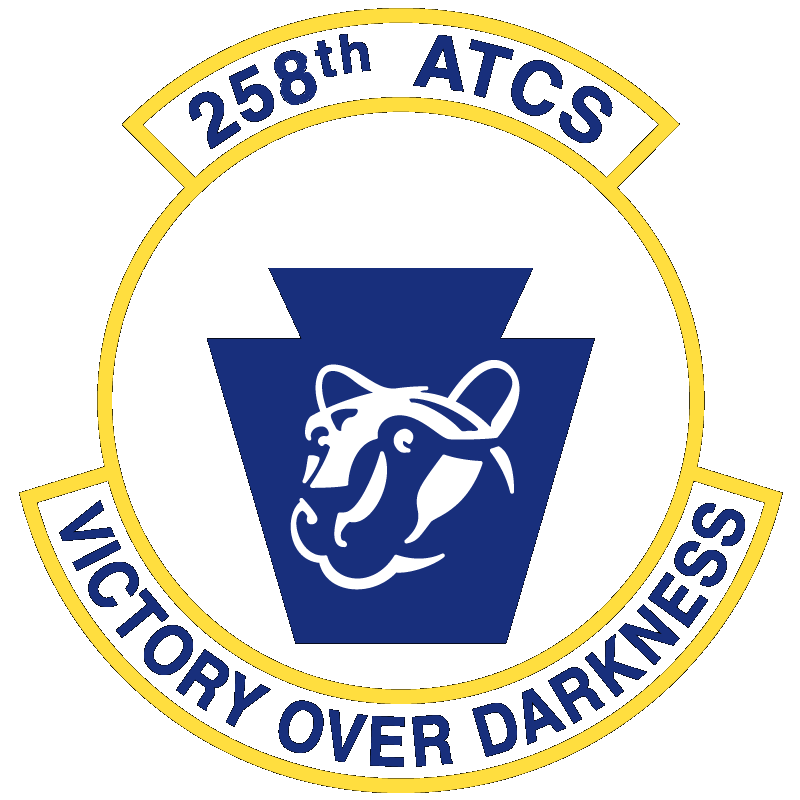
- Active: 2021–present
- Country: United States
- Branch: United States Air Force
- Type: Air traffic control
- Role: Mobile ATC
- Part of: ANG/ACC
- Garrison/HQ: Johnstown-Cambria County Airport, Pennsylvania
- Motto: Victory Over Darkness

The United States Air Force's 258th Air Traffic Control Squadron (258 ATCS) is an Air Traffic Control unit located at Johnstown Air National Guard Station, Johnstown-Cambria County Airport, Pennsylvania. The 258 ATCS is a geographically separated unit of the 171st Air Refueling Wing

== Mission ==
An important part of the Guard air traffic control mission includes establishing bases in locations without existing air traffic control facilities. The mission is integral to the successful and safe operations of United States Air Force, Department of Defense, and allied aircraft at airfields worldwide.

== History ==
114th Air Traffic Control Flight was given a change of station order from State College, Pennsylvania to Johnstown, Pennsylvania and redesignated the 258 ATCS on 17 May 1997.

== Awards ==
- 2019 – RAPCON D. Ray Hardin United States Air Force Air Traffic Control Facility of the Year
- 2019– Lima Site 85 Air National Guard Team of the Year
- 2020– Meritorious Unit Award

== Career Fields ==
The 258 ATCS has numerous career fields including: Air traffic controller, Radar Airfield and Weather Systems (RAWS), Electrical Power Production, Heating Ventilation and Air Conditioning (HVAC), Logistics Plans, Material Management Administrative, and Personnel.

== Bases stationed ==
- Johnstown-Cambria County Airport, Pennsylvania (1997–present)

== Deployments ==
Personnel have deployed to locations including: Germany, Italy, Denmark, Portugal, South Korea, the Bahamas, Colombia, Hungary, Honduras, Saudi Arabia, Argentina, Tunisia, Cyprus, Bosnia, Pakistan, Afghanistan, Iraq, Uzbekistan, and Lithuania
