= Northeastern Pennsylvania Air Show =

Air show

Northeastern Pennsylvania Airshow
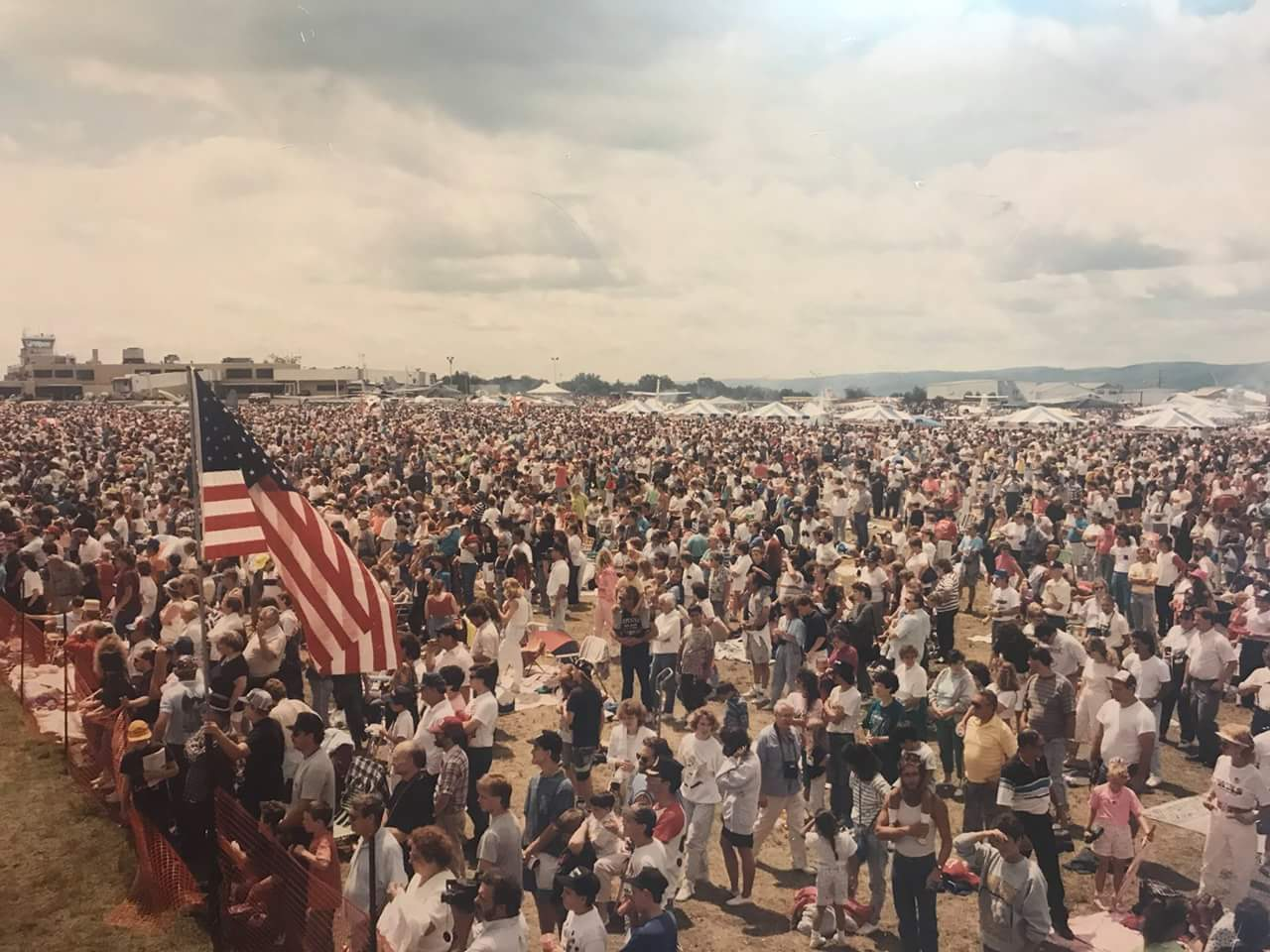
- air show in 1994
- Status: Active
- Genre: Air Show
- Venue: Wilkes-Barre/Scranton International Airport
- Locations: Pittston Township, Pennsylvania
- Country: United States
- Years active: 1983–2000; 2017
- Website: nepairshow.com

The Northeastern Pennsylvania Airshow, also called the NEPAirshow, is an air show that occurs sometime in the summer at the Wilkes-Barre/Scranton International Airport in Pittston Township, Pennsylvania. The event features dozens of military, commercial and general aviation aircraft from around the world.

== History ==
The air show originated in 1983 (43 years ago) and saw large crowds from that year until 2000. The air show for 2001 was cancelled due to Wilkes-Barre/Scranton International Airport seeing huge runway improvements and a new terminal building project. The show did not return; this was likely due to the air show having lost about $23,000 in 2000.

However, in 2013, Lackawanna County Commissioner Corey O'Brien proposed bringing it back in 2014. However, this fell through; the idea was met with skepticism due to the airshows failure to turn a profit its final year. Then in late 2016, the Bi-County Airport Board, which oversees the airport, pushed for the return. The event was officially announced in mid-June 2017. The airport saw tens of thousands to attend the 2017 air show over the two days.

While the air show was expected to return in subsequent years, COVID and lack of a major jet team have been blamed for the failure to return since.

=== Performers in 2017 ===
- U.S. Army Golden Knight parachute team
- U.S. Air Force F-22 Raptor Demo Team
- U.S. Air Force Heritage Flight
- U.S. Navy F/A-18 Hornet Demo Team
- Mikoyan-Gurevich MiG-17
- Short Tucano
- P-51 Mustang
- B-25J Mitchell
- Jacquie B. Airshows
- Rob Holland Ultimate Airshows
- Kevin Russo Airshows
- Greg & Ashley Shelton Wingwalking
- Chefpitts Airshows

=== Static Display aircraft in 2017 ===
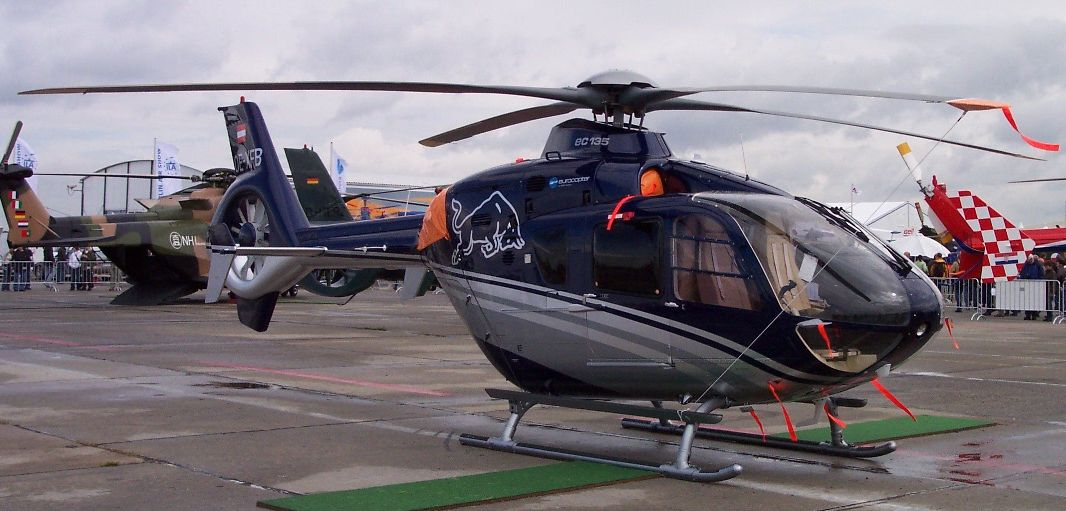
Eurocopter

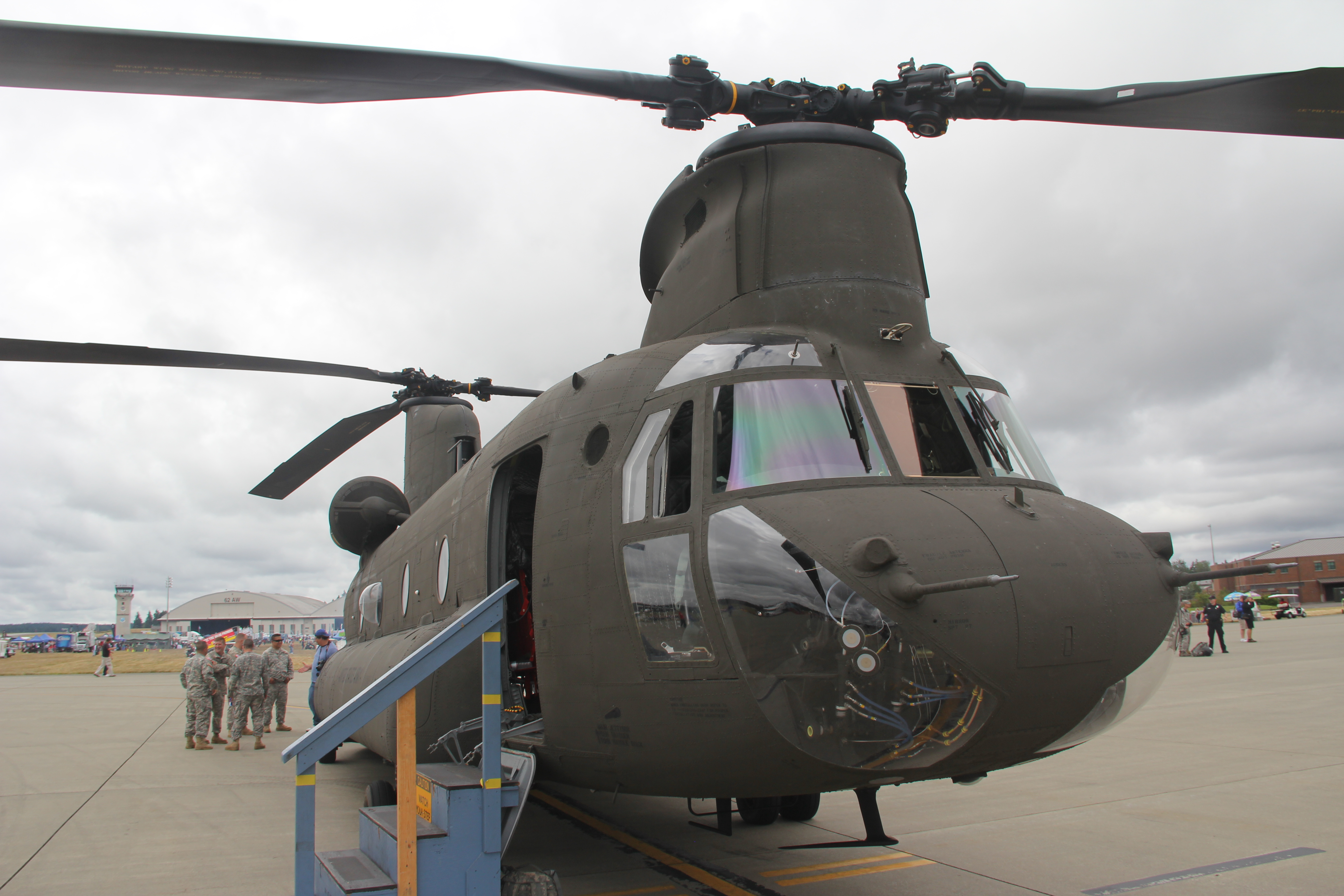
Boeing CH-47 Chinook

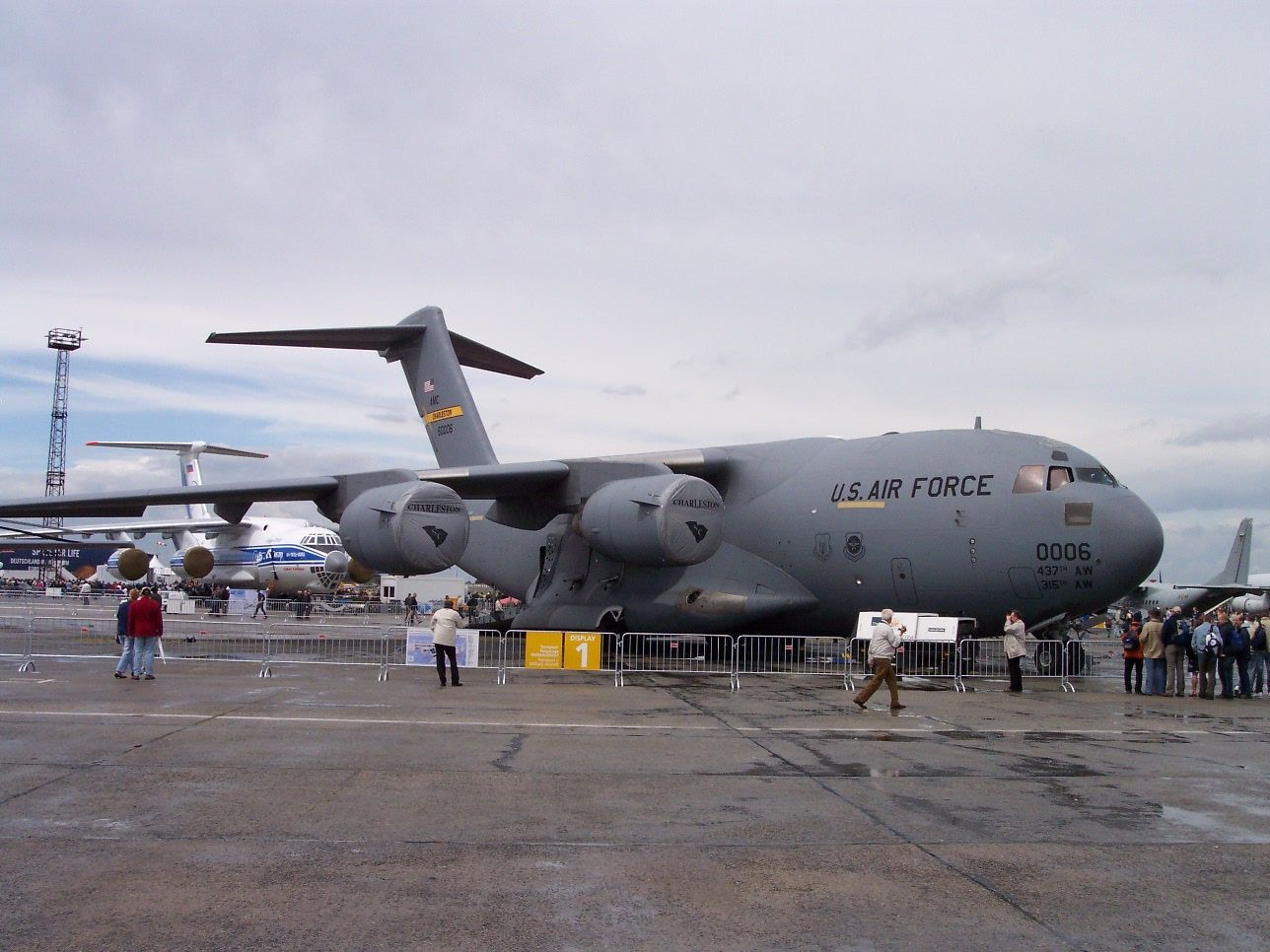
Boeing C-17 Globemaster

- Aeronca L-16
- Boeing-Stearman PT-17
- Boeing C-17 Globemaster III
- Douglas C-54 Skymaster
- Fairchild C-123 Provider
- Cessna O-1 Bird Dog
- Boeing CH-47 Chinook
- Northrop Grumman E-2 Hawkeye
- Boeing EA-18G Growler
- Lockheed EC-130
- Boeing KC-135 Stratotanker
- L-21B Seneca
- MC-130J Combat Shadow II
- Eurocopter HH-65 Dolphin
- Navion L-17A
- North American T-6 Texan
- Stinson L-5 Sentinel
- Stinson Voyager
- Beechcraft T-6 Texan II
- T-6G Texan
- T-38 Talon
- Titan T-51 Mustang
- TBM-3E Avenger
- CubCrafters CC18-180 Top Cub
- Sikorsky UH-60 Black Hawk
- Eurocopter UH-72 Lakota

== See also ==
- Aviation in Pennsylvania
