= Commonwealth Commuter Flight 317 =

1974 aviation accident in Pennsylvania, United States

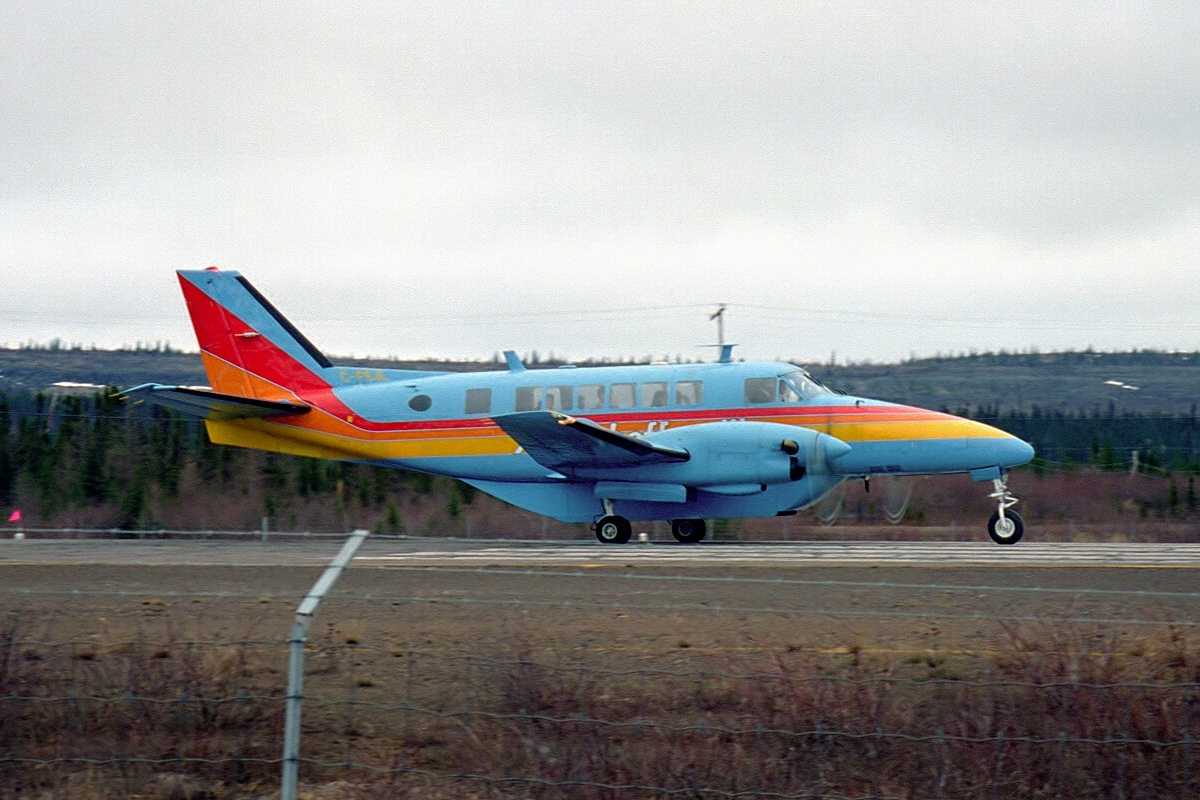
- A Beechcraft 99 similar to the accident aircraft

Accident
- Date: January 6, 1974
- Summary: Premature descent below safe approach slope
- Site: Johnstown–Cambria County Airport, Richland Township, Cambria County, Pennsylvania, United States; 40°18′40″N 78°50′00″W

Aircraft
- Aircraft type: Beechcraft Model 99A
- Operator: Air East
- Registration: N125AE
- Flight origin: Pittsburgh International Airport, Pittsburgh, Pennsylvania
- Destination: Johnstown–Cambria County Airport, Richland Township, Cambria County, Pennsylvania
- Passengers: 15
- Crew: 2
- Fatalities: 12
- Injuries: 5
- Survivors: 5

Commonwealth Commuter Flight 317 was a scheduled commuter flight from Pittsburgh, Pennsylvania, to Johnstown, Pennsylvania, operated by Air East. On January 6, 1974, while on approach to Johnstown–Cambria County Airport, the Beechcraft Model 99A operating the flight crashed short of the runway after it failed to maintain flying speed and made a premature descent below the safe approach slope for undetermined reasons. Of the 15 passengers and two crew members on board, 11 passengers and the aircraft captain were killed.

== Accident ==
Flight 317 took off from Pittsburgh International Airport at about 6:30 p.m. on January 6, 1974, on a regularly scheduled commuter flight to Johnstown. There were 15 passengers aboard. The flight's captain, Daniel Brannon, 39, had accumulated 6,331 flight hours, including 383 hours in the Beechcraft 99A; the first officer, Gerald Knouff, 24, had accumulated 1790 flight hours, including 380 hours in the Beechcraft 99A. Both pilots had been hired by Air East in July 1973, approximately six months before the accident.

At around 7:05 p.m., while on approach to Runway 33 at Johnstown–Cambria County Airport in Richland Township, the plane descended below the lowest safe approach slope, then stalled, at which point the pilots lost control. The plane clipped the top of a bank of elevated approach lights, soared over a highway (U.S. Route 219) and, while in a nose-up, wings-level attitude, slammed into the top of a steep embankment approximately 100 yards short of the runway. "It was a matter of five feet, and he would have been clear," Warren Krise, an Air East official, said afterward.

The plane pancaked on impact and was torn apart. The underside of the fuselage was crushed upward, the top of the passenger cabin collapsed downward, and the cabin walls were forced outward. "The nose was thrown 50-75 yards from impact, the wings were nearly shorn from the fuselage and the tail section was severed completely," a contemporary news report said. The floor structure and seat tracks were destroyed; all of the seatbelts remained intact, but their floor anchorages were destroyed. Although spilled aviation fuel soaked the wreckage and many of the passengers, there was no fire.

Both pilots were thrown from the aircraft when it tore apart. Brannon was killed; Knouff was hospitalized in critical condition, and survived. 10 of the 15 passengers aboard were killed instantly, and another died later at a local hospital, bringing the total death toll to 12. The four surviving passengers were all seriously injured; two of them remained hospitalized for more than two months after the crash. National Transportation Safety Board investigators noted that six of the plane's 17 occupants, including both pilots, were thrown clear of the plane through the opening left by the severed nose section; the first officer and one passenger were the only survivors among those six. The remaining 11 passengers, including the three other survivors, were trapped in the wreckage.

Four young men passing by on the highway discovered the wreckage of Flight 317 at around 7:15 p.m., approximately 10 minutes after the crash, but the crash was not noticed within the airport for several minutes afterward. After the air traffic controller sent his last transmission to the flight, he attended to other duties. Some time later, after an Air East ramp agent asked if the controller had been communicating with the flight, the controller tried without success to reestablish communications with the flight. The Air East ramp agent then got into his car and began a search of the airfield. As he drove along the runway, he encountered a young man, one of the four passers-by who'd found the wreckage, who informed him that a plane had crashed near the end of the runway. The ramp agent drove back to the terminal and informed the controller, who notified the police department. The first rescue vehicle arrived on the scene at around 7:55 p.m.

== Aircraft ==
The aircraft involved in the accident, registration N125AE, was a Beechcraft Model 99A owned by Allegheny Airlines and operated by Air East under Allegheny Airlines' Commonwealth Commuter trademark. It was powered by two Pratt & Whitney Canada PT6 aircraft engines, made its first flight in 1969 and had seen a total of 7,503 flight hours before the crash.

The airplane was destroyed in the crash.

== Investigation ==
The National Transportation Safety Board investigated the crash.

Knouff told investigators that Brannon had been a "perfectionist" who "went by the book in everything he did," but added that, during previous flights together, he'd noticed that Brannon had developed a habit of making landing approaches at slower-than-prescribed airspeeds – airspeeds "as low as 93 or 95 KIAS." When asked if Brannon had used that technique on the night of the accident, Knouff replied, "He could have been. I don't recall if he was or not, but possibly."

The National Transportation Safety Board concluded that the crash was caused by "a premature descent below a safe approach slope followed by a stall and loss of aircraft control." Although the reason for the premature descent could not be determined, investigators concluded it was probably the result of either "a deliberate descent below the published minimum descent altitude to establish reference with the approach lights and make the landing," "a visual impairment or optical illusion created by the runway/approach lighting systems," and/or "downdrafts near the approach end of the runway."

== Aftermath ==
The crash directly led to the end of Air East, the operator of the flight. On March 7, 1974, the Federal Aviation Administration revoked Air East's operator's certificate and ordered the airline to immediately halt all operations, charging Air East with using unqualified pilots and mechanically unsafe aircraft. An FAA spokesman said the shutdown order stemmed from an investigation into Air East's operations and records in the aftermath of the crash.

The shutdown order stated in part: "By reason of numerous violations, unsafe practices, policies, and coercing tactics... Air East, Inc., has demonstrated that it does not possess the judgement, responsibility or compliance disposition required of a holder of an air taxi commercial operators certificate."
