= Allegheny Airlines Flight 604 =

1965 aviation accident

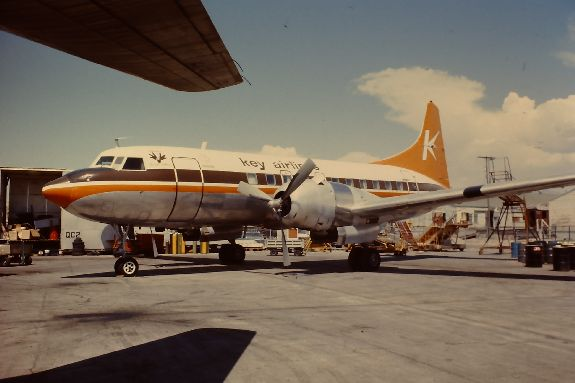
- N8415H, the aircraft involved.

Accident
- Date: July 23, 1965
- Summary: Engine failure on takeoff; crash into terrain due to improper procedures.
- Site: 5 miles Northeast of Williamsport Regional Airport; 41.341°N 76.799°W

Aircraft
- Aircraft type: Convair CV-440
- Operator: Allegheny Airlines
- Registration: N8415H
- Flight origin: Pittsburgh International Airport, Pennsylvania, U.S.
- Stopover: DuBois Regional Airport, Pennsylvania
- 1st stopover: Mid-State Regional Airport, Philipsburg, Pennsylvania
- 2nd stopover: Williamsport Regional Airport, Pennsylvania
- Last stopover: Wilkes-Barre/Scranton International Airport, Pennsylvania
- Destination: Newark Liberty International Airport, New Jersey
- Occupants: 40
- Passengers: 36
- Crew: 4
- Fatalities: 0
- Injuries: 23
- Survivors: 40

Allegheny Airlines Flight 604 was a regularly scheduled daily flight from Pittsburgh International Airport in Pittsburgh, Pennsylvania to Newark Liberty International Airport in Newark, New Jersey via DuBois, Philipsburg, Williamsport and Wilkes-Barre/Scranton. Forty occupants were on board (36 passengers and 4 crew members) on July 23, 1965, when during the Williamsport to Wilkes-Barre/Scranton leg a right engine failure and subsequent failure to follow engine out procedures by the flight crew caused the aircraft to crash northeast of the Williamsport Regional Airport.

== Aircraft and crew ==
The aircraft a Convair CV-440 (serial number: 125) registered N8415H had 26,266 hours on the air frame and had been delivered to Allegheny in 1953. The flight crew included Captain Allen J. Lauber (36), who was hired in 1955 and was certified in the DC-3, CV240/340/440 as well as M 2-0-2. At the time of the accident, Lauber had logged over 10,000 hours total time. First Officer James P. McClure (33) was hired by the airline in 1961, had 5,061 hours total time and 1,410 hrs in the CV-440. First officer-trainee Robert V. Leeman (30) was hired just two days before the crash. Flight attendant Barbara A. Creske was hired in 1963 and had mandatory recurring emergency training the month prior to the crash.

== Flight ==
Flight 604 departed from runway 09 at Williamsport Regional Airport when personnel in the airport's control tower noticed smoke trailing from the right engine. This was immediately relayed to the flight crew; in response captain Lauber transmitted, "Flight 604 is coming back in, ... we've got the right engine feathered." Tower then asked what was the desired runway and it was determined they'd enter the pattern and land on runway 09. Tower instructed flight 604 to do this, and captain Lauber replied "Okay." Several witnesses on the ground observed the flight remain south of the runway 09/27 center line. Several airport workers and other witnesses saw fire and smoke trailing the right wing and observed the aircraft climbing slightly. The aircraft was in a nose high attitude but in a shallow climb. After the tower received the captain's transmission further attempts to communicate with the flight were unsuccessful. An aircraft mechanic at the airport estimated to aircraft to be at 500 ft above the runway threshold of the 27 end of runway 09/27. The aircraft continued in a northeasterly direction. A witness in her yard estimated the aircraft to be 700 to 900 feet above her house when it passed overhead and disappeared beyond a ridge. The woman then said she heard the propeller noise soften to silence prior to an explosion sound.

The aircraft's initial impact was upward on a hill at an elevation of 1,100 msl. The aircraft bounced several times, the left wing was ripped off 38 feet from the tip by a telephone pole, and the right wing was ripped off 24 feet from the tip after digging into the hill. The aircraft then slid down a steep hill and caught fire after coming to rest. Passengers and crew evacuated via a tear in the fuselage between the cockpit and cabin. Flight attendant Barbara Creske led the evacuation helping Captain Lauber, who suffered lower body injures outside the fuselage. Creske also aided multiple injured passengers evacuate. Eight minutes after impact the right wing and cockpit were fully engulfed in fire. Emergency personnel were on scene within five minutes.

Of the 40 passengers and crew, 23 were injured; 11 seriously. Common injuries included leg, neck and back injuries. One man's arm was severely burned when trying to aid in the rescue effort. All 40 occupants survived the accident.

== See also ==
- List of airline accidents
- Aviation in Pennsylvania
- Allegheny Airlines Flight 371
