= Johnstown–Cambria County Airport =

John Murtha Johnstown–Cambria County Airport

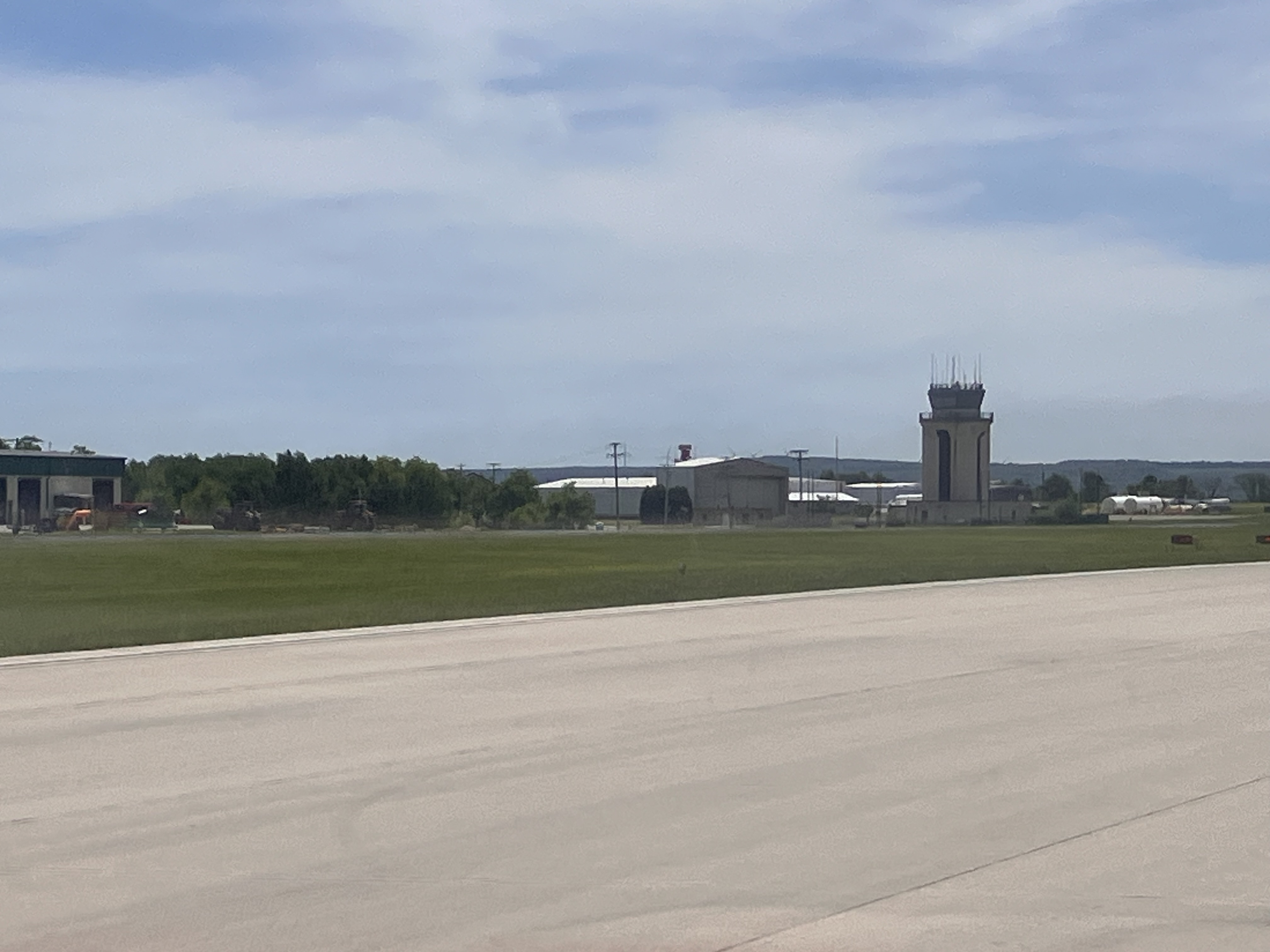
- Control tower
- IATA: JST; ICAO: KJST; FAA LID: JST

Summary
- Airport type: Public
- Owner: Johnstown–Cambria County Airport Authority
- Serves: Johnstown, Pennsylvania
- Location: Richland Township, Cambria County, Pennsylvania
- Opened: 1948; 78 years ago as Johnstown Municipal Airport
- Elevation AMSL: 2,284 ft (696 m)
- Coordinates: 40°18′56″N 078°50′05″W
- Website: flyjst.com

Maps
- FAA Diagram as of April 2024
- Interactive map of John Murtha Johnstown–Cambria County Airport

Runways
| Direction | Length | | Surface |
| Direction | ft | m | Surface |
|---|---|---|---|
| 15/33 | 7,004 | 2,135 | Asphalt |
| 5/23 | 4,387 | 1,337 | Asphalt |

Statistics (2022)
- Aircraft operations: 24,880
- Based aircraft: 49
- Source: Federal Aviation Administration

John Murtha Johnstown–Cambria County Airport (IATA: JST, ICAO: KJST, FAA LID: JST) is a civil-military airport 3 miles (4.8 km) northeast of Johnstown, in Richland Township, Cambria County, Pennsylvania. It is owned by Johnstown–Cambria County Airport Authority and is named after the late Congressman John Murtha. It sees one airline, subsidized by the Essential Air Service.

The National Plan of Integrated Airport Systems for 2025–2029 categorized it as a non-primary commercial service airport (between 2,500 and 10,000 enplanements per year).

Johnstown–Cambria County Airport is home to several military units. The airport houses the Pennsylvania Army National Guard's 1-104th Attack Reconnaissance Battalion (Company's HHC, A, C, D, and E) and Det 1, Company C, 2-104 General Support Aviation Battalion (Air Ambulance). It also houses the 258th Air Traffic Control Squadron (258 ATCS) of the Pennsylvania Air National Guard, and Marine Wing Support Squadron 471 (MWSS-471), Detachment A of the 4th Marine Aircraft Wing (4th MAW) of the U.S. Marine Corps Reserve. The aerial military units fly helicopters rather than fixed-wing aircraft.

The airport is served by United Express CRJ-200 aircraft operated by SkyWest to Washington Dulles and Chicago O’Hare.

== History ==
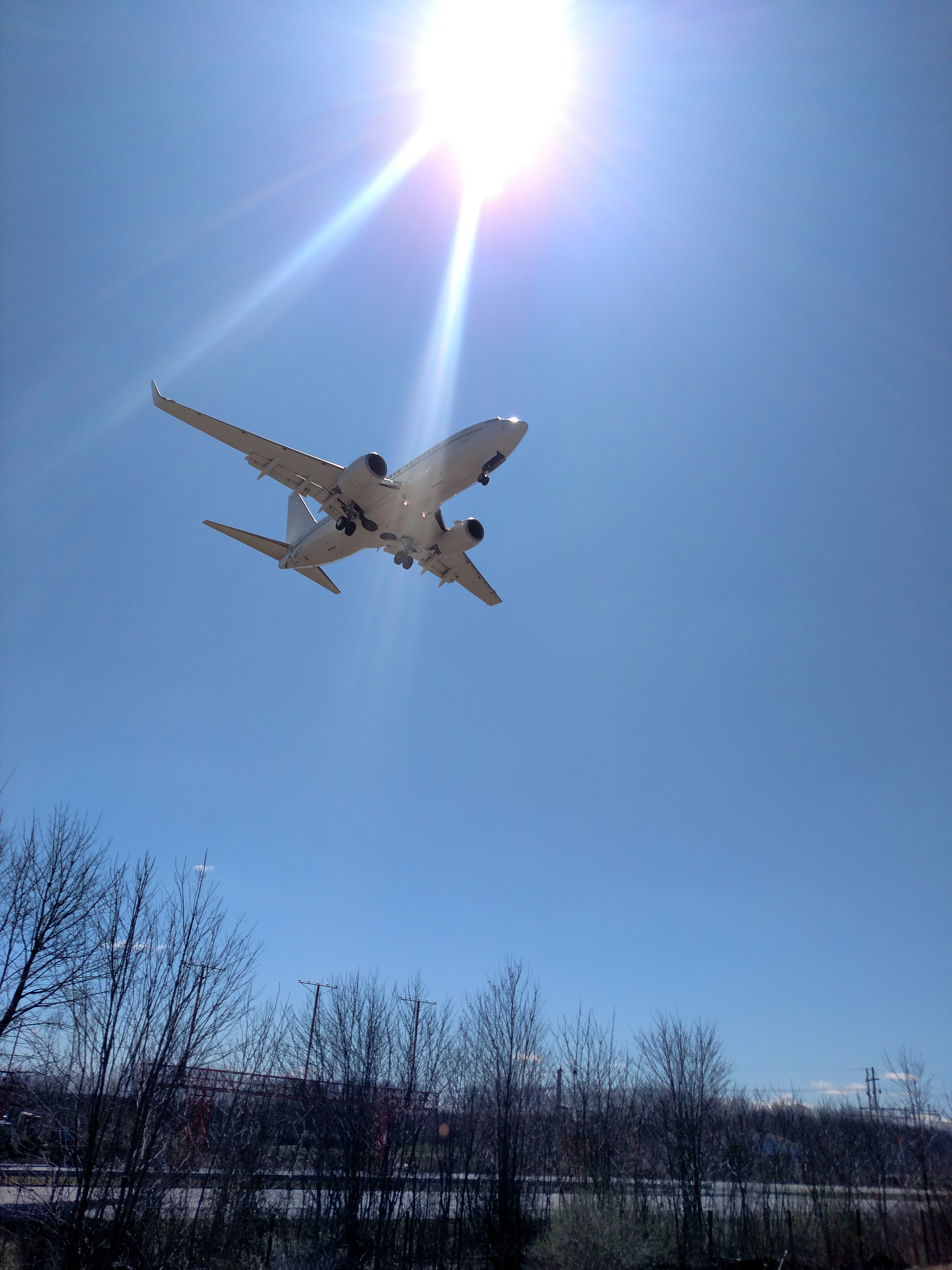
Boeing 737 flying at the airport

The airport opened in 1948 as Johnstown Municipal Airport, Its first passenger airline flights were TWA DC-3s in 1948; All American Airways replaced TWA in 1949 and successor Allegheny Airlines was replaced by Allegheny Commuter in 1970. US Airways served the airport in the 1990s and 2000s with flights to Pittsburgh International Airport.

Traffic through the airport peaked in 2004 when US Airways flew 21,000 passengers through Johnstown. However, the recession led the weakened US Airways to drop service to Johnstown in 2009, and traffic dropped to near zero. The airport was the subject of controversy in the 2000s when reports showed Democratic Congressman John Murtha had steered $150 million in federal taxpayer dollars to the airport in the 2000s, despite decreasing traffic.

Since US Airways stopped service in 2009, Johnstown has been served by airlines using Essential Air Service funding to connect Johnstown to larger airports. The first was Colgan Air operating flights for United Airlines's United Express service to Washington-Dulles and Altoona. Colgan went bankrupt in 2012, so the EAS contract was picked up by Silver Airways, which flew from Johnstown to Dulles and DuBois. The city complained about Silver Airways's high prices and delays and requested that the EAS contract be awarded to Southern Airways Express. Southern's service began in November 2016 to Pittsburgh and Dulles (later switched to Baltimore-Washington). Southern's service was plagued by pilot and aircraft shortages, and the airport authority recommended the federal Department of Transportation award the contract to Boutique Air, which began service in to Pittsburgh and Baltimore-Washington in November 2018.

In 2020, the EAS contract was awarded to SkyWest Airlines to bring back jet service to Johnstown as United Express with flights to Chicago-O'Hare and Washington-Dulles. In 2022, SkyWest informed the U.S. Department of Transportation they would be leaving the Johnstown market, but when the DOT opened the contract for bids, SkyWest re-entered the competition along with three other carriers.

== Finances ==
It has only two scheduled flights and little other activity, but as of January 2016, the airport had received almost $200 million in federal subsidies. That funding has not been used to subsidize the facility's operations, including the terminal; it has instead been used to construct a concrete reinforced runway for military purposes and to build military installations near the airport. The airport is in the bottom 28% of all facilities receiving EAS funding. In 2004, an $8 million air traffic radar system was installed at the airport; it is operated by the Pennsylvania Air National Guard.

== Facilities ==
The airport covers 650 acres (263 ha) at an elevation of 2,284 feet (696 m). It has two asphalt runways: 15/33 is 7,004 by 150 feet (2,135 x 46 m) and 5/23 is 4,387 by 100 feet (1,337 x 30 m).

In the year ending December 31, 2022 the airport had 24,880 aircraft operations, average 68 per day: 68% general aviation, 25% military, and 7% airline. 49 aircraft were then based at the airport: 21 single-engine, 4 multi-engine, 4 jet, and 20 military.

== Airline and destinations ==
| Airlines | Destinations | Refs |
|---|---|---|
| United Express | Chicago–O'Hare, Washington–Dulles | |

== Statistics ==
Top domestic destinations at JST (July 2025 – June 2026)
| Rank | City | Passengers |
|---|---|---|
| 1 | Washington-Dulles, Virginia | 10,300 |
| 2 | Chicago-O'Hare, Illinois | 8,390 |

Passenger boardings (enplanements) by year, as per the FAA
| Year | 2009 | 2010 | 2011 | 2012 | 2013 | 2014 | 2015 | 2016 | 2017 | 2018 | 2019 | 2020 | 2021 | 2022 | 2023 | 2024 | 2025 |
|---|---|---|---|---|---|---|---|---|---|---|---|---|---|---|---|---|---|
| Enplanements | 7,956 | 8,457 | 7,956 | 6,986 | 6,186 | 4,856 | 4,338 | 4,193 | 3,594 | 4,381 | 6,309 | 3,149 | 8,519 | 7,763 | 14,000 | 17,690 | 19,340 |
| Change | ▲4.22% | ▲6.30% | ▼5.92% | ▼12.19% | ▼11.45% | ▼21.50% | ▼10.67% | ▼3.34% | ▼14.29% | ▲21.90% | ▲44.01% | ▼50.09% | ▲170.53% | ▼8.87% | ▲83.56% | ▲24.14% | ▲9.33% |
| Airline | Colgan Air dba United Express | Colgan Air dba United Express | Colgan Air dba United Express | Silver Airways dba United Express | Silver Airways dba United Express | Silver Airways dba United Express | Silver Airways | Silver Airways | Southern Airways Express | Southern Airways Express | Boutique Air | Boutique Air | SkyWest Airlines dba United Express | SkyWest Airlines dba United Express | SkyWest Airlines dba United Express | SkyWest Airlines dba United Express | SkyWest Airlines dba United Express |
| Destination(s) | Washington-Dulles | Altoona Washington-Dulles | Altoona Washington-Dulles | Altoona Washington-Dulles | Altoona Washington-Dulles | Altoona Washington-Dulles | DuBois Washington-Dulles | DuBois Washington-Dulles | Baltimore Pittsburgh | Baltimore Pittsburgh | Baltimore Pittsburgh | Baltimore Pittsburgh | Chicago O'Hare Washington-Dulles | Chicago O'Hare Washington-Dulles | Chicago O'Hare Washington-Dulles | Chicago O'Hare Washington-Dulles | Chicago O'Hare Washington-Dulles |

== Accidents and incidents ==
- On January 6, 1974, Commonwealth Commuter Flight 317 crashed on approach to Runway 33, killing 12 of 17 on board.

== See also ==
- List of airports in Pennsylvania

== Other sources ==
- Essential Air Service documents (Docket OST-2002-11451) from the U.S. Department of Transportation:
  - Order 2002-9-23 (October 1, 2002): selecting Colgan Air, Inc., to provide subsidized Essential Air Service (EAS) at Altoona and Johnstown, Pennsylvania, for a two-year period at a combined annual subsidy rate of $847,576.
  - Order 2005-4-9 (April 8, 2005): reselects Colgan Air, Inc., d/b/a U.S. Airways Express, to continue providing essential air service (EAS) at Altoona and Johnstown, Pennsylvania, for a two-year period, and establishes a combined subsidy rate of $1,358,551 per year for service consisting of 18 nonstop round trips each week between Altoona and Washington (Dulles), and 18 nonstop round trips each week between Johnstown and Pittsburgh, with 19-seat Beech 1900D aircraft.
  - Order 2007-2-17 (February 16, 2007): selecting Colgan Air Inc., d/b/a US Airways Express, to continue providing essential air service (EAS) at Altoona consisting of 18 weekly nonstop round trips to Washington Dulles, and at Johnstown consisting of 18 weekly nonstop round trips to Pittsburgh. The combined annual subsidy is $2,364,462 based on service with 19-seat Beech 1900D turboprop aircraft for the two-year period beginning June 1, 2007, and all service would be operated as US Airways Express.
  - Order 2008-6-10 (June 10, 2008): re-selecting Colgan Air, Inc. d/b/a United Express, to provide subsidized essential air service (EAS) at Altoona and Johnstown, Pennsylvania, at a total annual subsidy rate of $2,788,845, for the period from June 15, 2008, through June 30, 2010.
  - Order 2010-5-10 (May 10, 2010): selecting Colgan Air Inc., operating as United Express, to provide essential air service (EAS) at Altoona and Johnstown, Pennsylvania, for a combined annual subsidy of $3,348,294, for the two-year period from July 1, 2010 to June 30, 2012.
  - Ninety-Day Notice (March 8, 2012): from Colgan Airlines, Inc. of termination of Essential Air Service at Altoona, Pennsylvania, and Johnstown, Pennsylvania
  - Order 2012-3-14 (March 23, 2012): prohibits Colgan Airlines, Inc. d/b/a United Airlines Express, from terminating service at Altoona and Johnstown, PA; Victoria, TX; Staunton, VA; and Beckley, Clarksburg/Fairmont, and Morgantown, WV, for 30 days beyond the end of the 90-day notice period, i.e. July 8, 2012. We are also requesting proposals by April 25, 2012, from air carriers interested in providing replacement Essential Air Service (EAS) at Victoria, TX; and Staunton, VA, for a new term, with or without subsidy.
  - Order 2012-4-30 (April 26, 2012): selecting Silver Airways, formerly Gulfstream International Airways, to provide Essential Air Service (EAS) at Altoona and Johnstown, Pennsylvania, to Washington Dulles International Airport, for a combined annual subsidy of $3,997,187. Service to be provided will be 18 weekly nonstop and one-stop round trips over an Altoona-Johnstown-Washington Dulles or Johnstown-Altoona-Washington Dulles routing using 34-seat Saab 340 aircraft for the two-year period beginning when the carrier begins full EAS at both communities.
