= Bradford Regional Airport =

- IATA: BFD; ICAO: KBFD; FAA LID: BFD

Summary
- Airport type: Public
- Owner: Bradford Regional Airport Authority
- Operator: Bradford Regional Airport Authority
- Serves: Bradford, Pennsylvania
- Location: McKean County, Pennsylvania, U.S.
- Elevation AMSL: 2,143 ft (653 m)
- Coordinates: 41°48′11″N 078°38′24″W
- Website: BradfordAirport.net

Maps
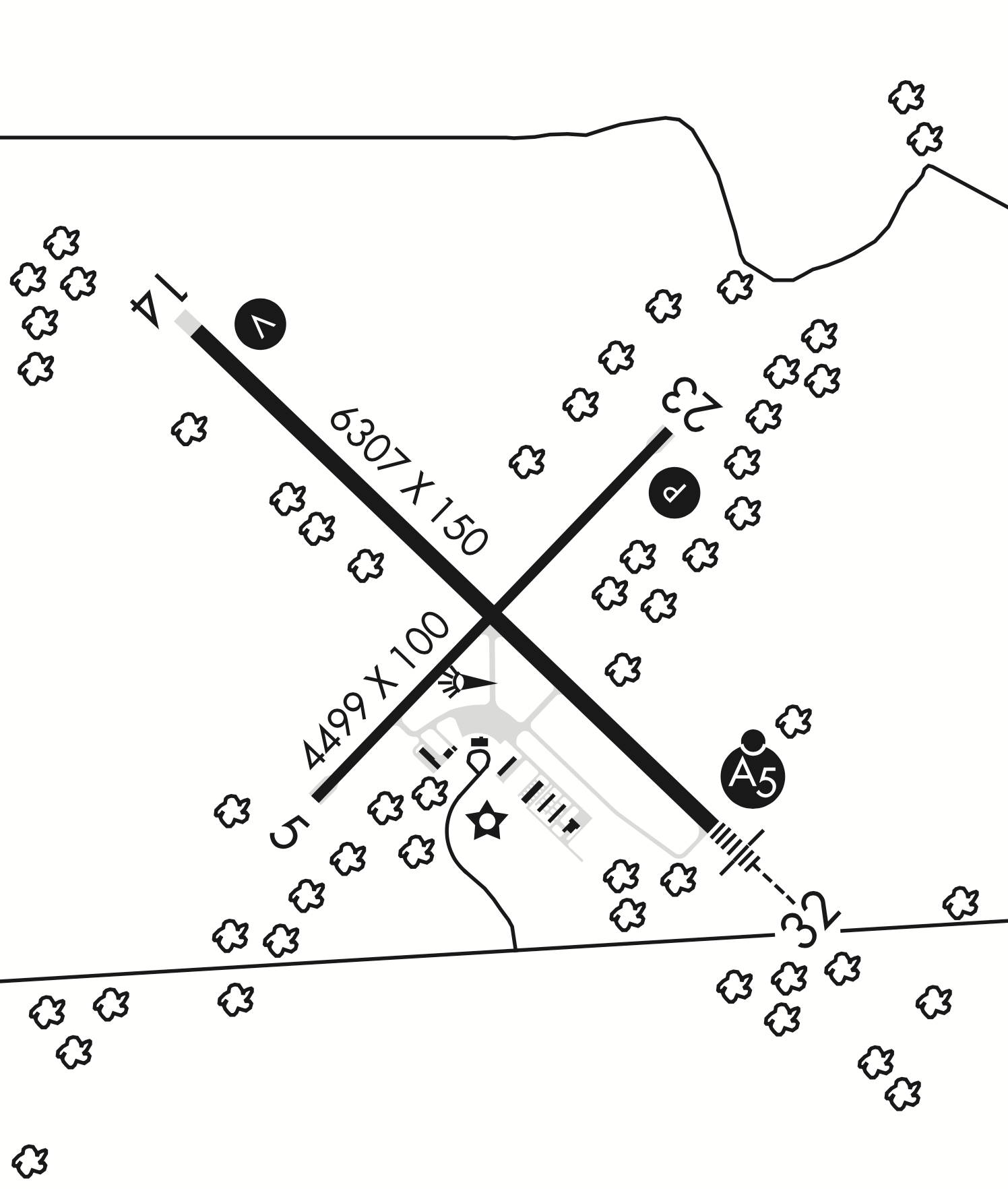
- Airport diagram

- Location within Pennsylvania Location within the United States

Runways
Direction	Length		Surface
Direction	ft	m	Surface
14/32	6,307	1,922	Asphalt
5/23	4,499	1,371	Asphalt

Statistics
- Aircraft operations (2019): 2,987
- Based aircraft (2022): 15
- Source: Federal Aviation Administration

Bradford Regional Airport (IATA: BFD, ICAO: KBFD, FAA LID: BFD) is 11 miles (18 km) south of Bradford, in Lafayette Township, McKean County, Pennsylvania. It has scheduled airline service subsidized by the Essential Air Service program.

The airport is owned by the Bradford Regional Airport Authority and serves Pennsylvania and western New York including Olean, New York. There is an armory at the airport for the National Guard.

The National Plan of Integrated Airport Systems for 2021–2025 categorized it as a non-primary commercial service airport (between 2,500 and 10,000 enplanements per year).

== Former airline service ==
Its first scheduled airline flights were United Airlines Douglas DC-3s in 1948. In 1953 United's DC-3 flew New York Newark Airport - Philadelphia - Bradford - Youngstown - Akron/Canton - Cleveland - Toledo - Chicago Midway Airport - Moline, IL - Cedar Rapids - Omaha - Lincoln, NE. United left in 1954.

In 1953 Allegheny Airlines DC-3s stopped at Bradford on a multi-stop route between Buffalo, NY and Pittsburgh. In 1971 Allegheny Convair 580s flew nonstop to Erie, Harrisburg, Jamestown, NY, New York Newark Airport, Pittsburgh and Washington National Airport and direct to Detroit. Allegheny introduced McDonnell Douglas DC-9-30s and flew one-stop in 1976 from Chicago O'Hare Airport via Erie and from New York LaGuardia Airport via Elmira while continuing to fly nonstop Convair 580s from Buffalo and Pittsburgh. Allegheny remained until 1979 when Allegheny Commuter took over, with nonstop Beechcrafts from Buffalo and nonstop Short 330s from Pittsburgh. Allegheny Commuter service continued for a number of years for Allegheny successor USAir. In 1994 Allegheny Commuter successor USAir Express was operating nonstop code sharing BAe Jetstream 31s to Pittsburgh. USAir changed its name to US Airways with US Airways Express Beechcraft 1900Cs being flown nonstop to Pittsburgh in 1999.

== Facilities ==
The airport covers 1,015 acres (411 ha) at an elevation of 2,143 feet (653 m). It has two asphalt runways: 14/32 is 6,307 by 150 feet (1,922 x 46 m) and 5/23 is 4,499 by 100 feet (1,371 x 30 m).

In the year ending January 31, 2019, the airport had 2,987 aircraft operations, an average of 8 per day: 80% commercial, 14% general aviation, 4% air taxi and 2% military. In April 2022, there were 15 aircraft based at this airport: all 15 single-engine.

== Airline and destinations ==
Southern Airways Express currently provides BFD with daily commercial flights to Pittsburgh International Airport and Washington Dulles International Airport. There are two daily departures to each destination. Scheduled passenger flights:

Airlines	Destinations	Refs
Southern Airways Express	Pittsburgh, Washington–Dulles (both end January 31, 2027)	
United Express	Washington–Dulles (begins February 1, 2027)	

== Statistics ==
Top domestic destinations from BFD (January - December 2025)
Rank	City	Passengers
1	Washington-Dulles, Virginia	1,600
2	Pittsburgh, Pennsylvania	1,200

Passenger boardings (enplanements) by year, as per the FAA
Year	2008	2009	2010	2011	2012	2013	2014	2015	2016	2017	2018
Enplanements	4,898	2,593	2,962	2,908	2,310	2,295	2,019	3,491	2,623	3,897	4,191
Change	▲57.80%	▼47.06%	▲14.23%	▼1.82%	▼20.56%	▼0.65%	▼12.03%	▲72.91%	▼24.86%	▲48.57%	▲7.54%
Airline	Colgan Air dba United Express	Gulfstream International Airlines dba Continental Connection	Gulfstream International Airlines dba Continental Connection	Gulfstream International Airlines dba United Express	Silver Airways dba United Express	Silver Airways dba United Express	Silver Airways dba United Express	Sun Air Express	Southern Airways Express	Southern Airways Express	Southern Airways Express
Destination(s)	Jamestown Washington-Dulles	Jamestown Cleveland	Jamestown Cleveland	Jamestown Cleveland	Jamestown Cleveland	Jamestown Cleveland	Jamestown Cleveland	Pittsburgh	Pittsburgh	Pittsburgh	Pittsburgh

== Accidents and incidents ==
Date	Flight Number	Information
December 24, 1968	AL0736	Allegheny Airlines Flight 736 crashed on approach to Bradford. 20 of the 47 passengers and crew on board are killed.
January 6, 1969	AL0737	Allegheny Airlines Flight 737 crashed on approach to Bradford. 11 of the 28 passengers and crew on board are killed.

== See also ==
- List of airports in Pennsylvania

== Other sources ==
- Essential Air Service documents (Docket OST-2003-14528) from the U.S. Department of Transportation:
  - Order 2006-3-17 (March 24, 2006): selecting RegionsAir to provide essential air service (EAS) with 30-passenger Saab 340 aircraft at Bradford, Pennsylvania, and Jamestown, New York, for two years. Service will be three round trips a day to Cleveland Hopkins International Airport, and the annual subsidy rate will be set at $1,649,913.
  - Order 2006-9-20 (September 21, 2006): tentatively vacating Order 2006-3-17 that selected Regions Air, Inc., to provide essential air service at Bradford, Pennsylvania, and Jamestown, New York, for two years. In addition, the Department is tentatively selecting Colgan Air, Inc., d/b/a US Airways Express to provide essential air service at both communities under its Pittsburgh option, i.e., three round trips each weekday and weekend to Pittsburgh at an annual subsidy rate of $2,434,827.
  - Order 2006-10-3 (October 4, 2006): finalizes Order 2006-9-20, which tentatively vacated our earlier selection of RegionsAir, Inc. to provide EAS at Bradford and Jamestown, and instead selects Colgan Air, Inc. d/b/a US Airways Express (Colgan) to provide EAS at both communities from October 1, 2006, through September 30, 2008, at an annual subsidy rate of $2,434,827. The subsidy rate is based on service to Pittsburgh, although Colgan has stated it is evaluating serving Washington Dulles International Airport instead of Pittsburgh, the service originally supported by both communities, at the same subsidy rate.
  - Order 2008-6-37 (June 30, 2008): selecting Gulfstream International Airlines, Inc. to provide subsidized essential air service (EAS) at Bradford, Pennsylvania, and Jamestown, New York, at a total annual subsidy of $2,701,865, for the two-year period from October 1, 2008, through September 30, 2010. However, if Gulfstream does not inaugurate full EAS by October 1, 2008, the selection defaults to Colgan Air, Inc. d/b/a United Express for the same two-period, for a total annual subsidy of $3,826,587.
  - Order 2010-9-12 (September 9, 2010): re-selecting Gulfstream International Airlines to provide essential air service (EAS) at Bradford, DuBois, and Oil City/Franklin, Pennsylvania, and Jamestown, New York, for a combined annual subsidy of $5,870,657 ($1,639,254 for Jamestown), from October 1, 2010, through September 30, 2012.
  - Order 2012-9-23 (September 27, 2012): selecting Silver Airways to provide Essential Air Service (EAS) at Bradford, DuBois, Franklin/Oil City, Pennsylvania, Jamestown, New York, and Parkersburg, West Virginia/Marietta, Ohio, for a combined annual subsidy of $10,348,117 ($1,940,272 for Bradford; $2,587,029 for DuBois, $1,293,515 for Franklin, $1,940,272 for Jamestown, and $2,587,029 for Parkersburg), from October 1, 2012, through September 30, 2014.
  - Notice of Intent (February 14, 2014): of Silver Airways Corp. to discontinue scheduled air service between Cleveland, Ohio (CLE) and: Jamestown, New York (JHW), Bradford, Pennsylvania (BFD), DuBois, Pennsylvania (DUJ), Franklin/Oil City, Pennsylvania (FKL), and Parkersburg, West Virginia/Marietta, Ohio (PKB).
  - Order 2014-4-26 (April 24, 2014): directing interested persons to show cause as to why the Department should not terminate the eligibility ... under the Essential Air Service (EAS) program based on criteria passed by Congress in the FAA Modernization and Reform Act of 2012 (Public Law No. 112-95). We find that Bradford is within 175 miles of a large or medium hub, Buffalo Niagara International Airport (BUF), a medium hub, and, thus, is subject to the 10-enplanement statutory criterion. We also find that during fiscal year 2013, Bradford generated a total of 4,292 passengers (inbound plus outbound). Consistent with the methodology described above, that results in an average of 6.9 enplanements per day, below the 10-enplanement statutory criterion necessary to remain eligible in the EAS program.
