= Flight 736 =

Flight 736 may refer to:

- United Airlines Flight 736, crashed on 21 April 1958
- Allegheny Airlines Flight 736, crashed on 24 December 1968
- Saudia Flight 736, crashed mid-air on 12 November 1996
