= Allegheny Airlines =

Airline of the United States (1953–1979)

IATA	ICAO	Call sign
AL	ALO	ALLEGHENY
- Founded: January 1, 1953
- Ceased operations: October 28, 1979 (expanded and renamed USAir)
- Hubs: Pittsburgh International Airport
- Parent company: US Airways Group
- Headquarters: Crystal City, Virginia, U.S.
- Key people: Ed Colodny (President & CEO)

Allegheny Airlines was a local service carrier, a scheduled airline that operated out of Pittsburgh, Pennsylvania, from 1953 to 1979, with routes primarily located in the Eastern United States. It was the direct predecessor of USAir, which was subsequently renamed US Airways, which itself merged with American Airlines. Its headquarters were at Washington National Airport in Arlington County, Virginia.

== History ==
Allegheny Airlines began as All American Aviation Company providing mail delivery starting on March 7, 1939. It was founded by du Pont family brothers Richard C. du Pont and Alexis Felix du Pont Jr.

=== Allegheny before 1979 ===
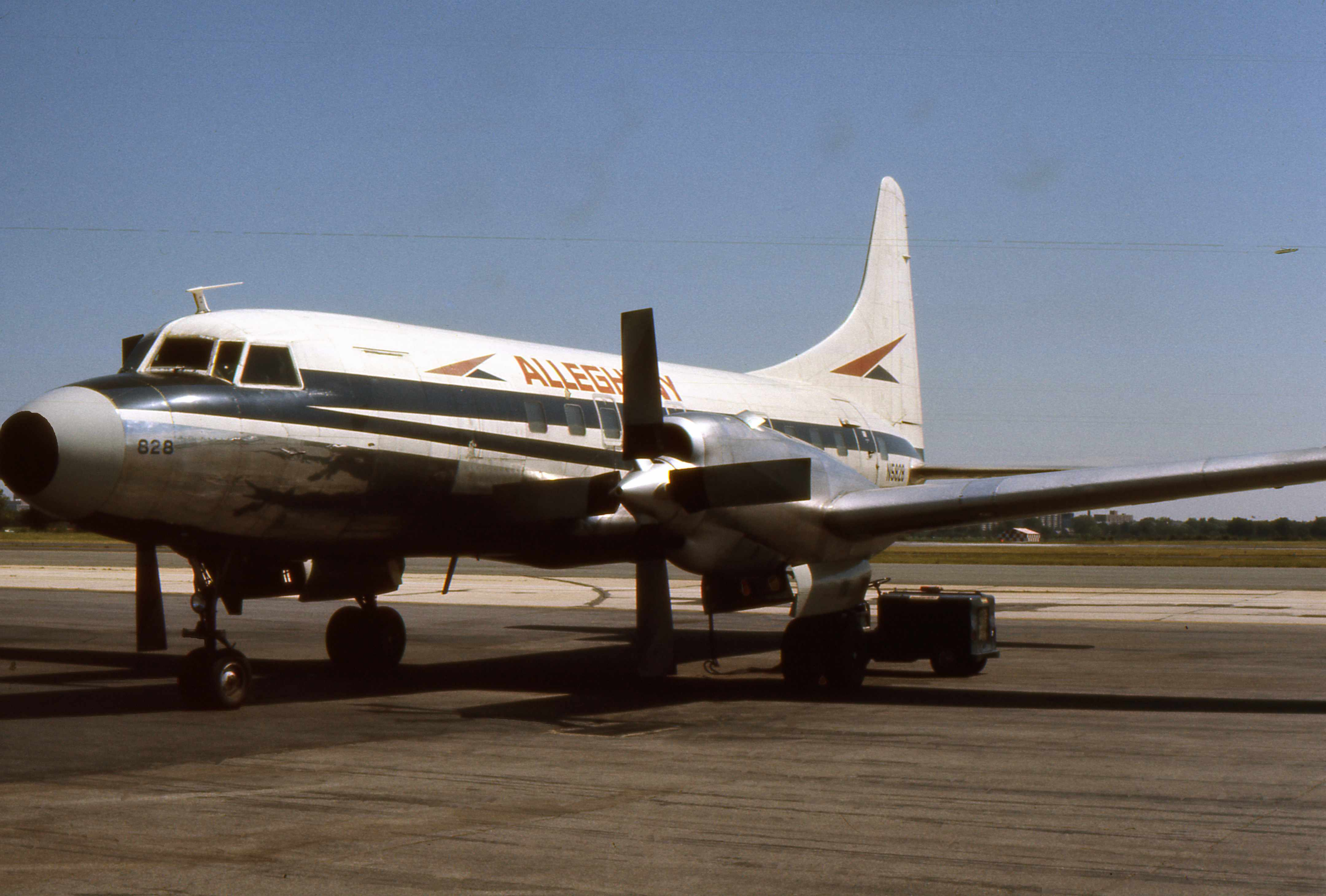
Allegheny had 41 Convair 580s in 1975.

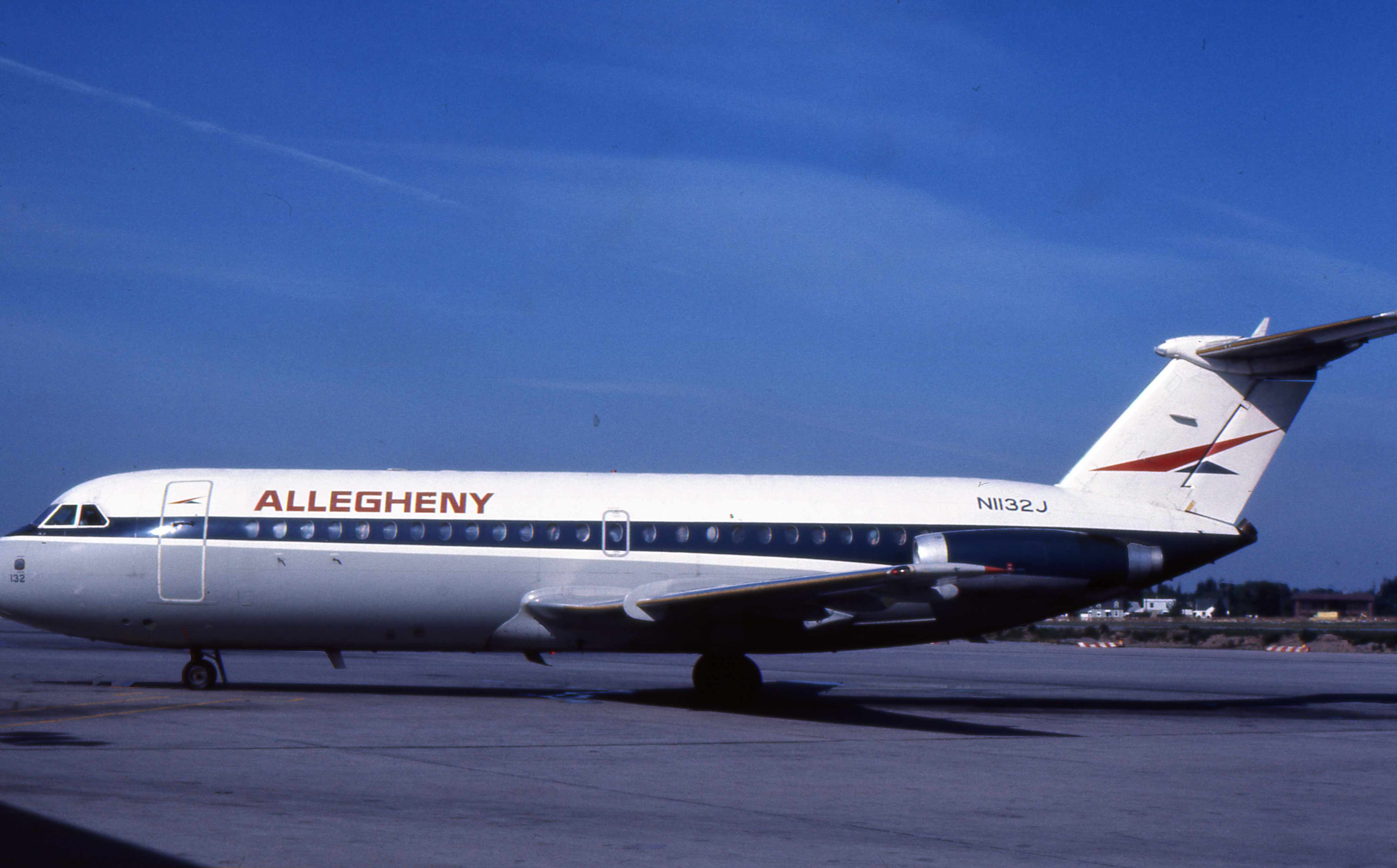
BAC 1-11

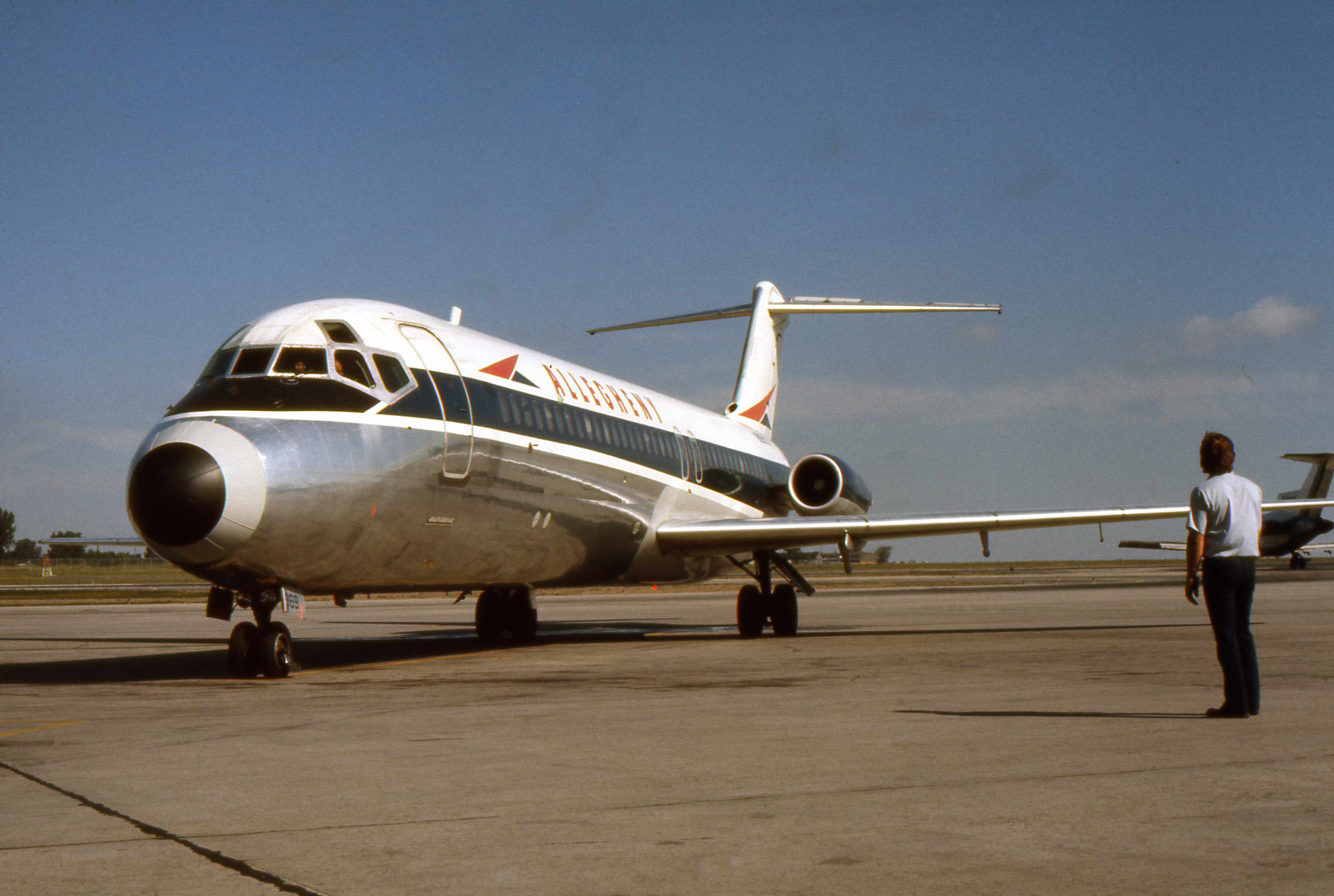
Douglas DC-9

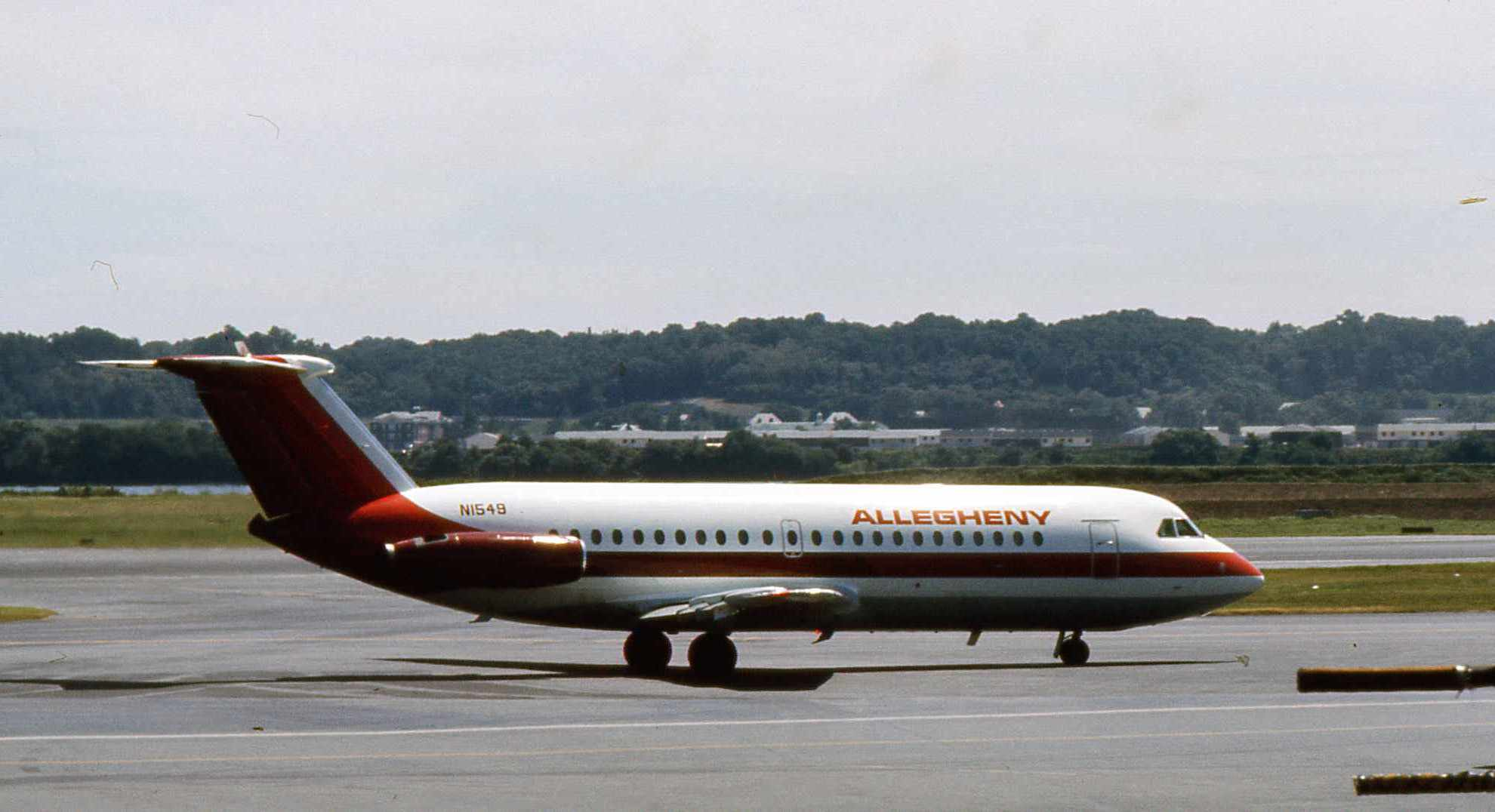
BAC 1–11 in new livery in 1975

In 1949, the company was renamed All American Airways as it switched from air mail to passenger service. That year, it also moved its headquarters from Pittsburgh to Washington National Airport. The airline kept its headquarters in or near the airport for 64 years through numerous renamings, until US Airways was acquired by American Airlines in 2013; American kept its own headquarters in Fort Worth, Texas, near Dallas-Fort Worth Airport.

On January 1, 1953, the company was again renamed, to Allegheny Airlines. Like other local service airlines, Allegheny was subsidized; in 1962 its revenue of $23.5 million included $6.5 million in "public service revenue".

In 1953, Allegheny's network blanketed Pennsylvania, reaching from Newark, New Jersey, to Cleveland, Ohio, and Huntington, West Virginia. It added Detroit (YIP) in 1956, Boston in April 1960, La Guardia in 1964, Norfolk in 1966, Toronto in 1967, and Louisville-Nashville-Memphis in 1968. The Lake Central Airlines merger in July 1968 added Chicago and St Louis, and the Mohawk Airlines merger in April 1972 added Montreal, Minneapolis, and many New York cities. Also added were Houston in 1978, Florida at the end of 1978 (TPA-MCO-PBI), and Phoenix in 1979.

In 1959, Allegheny debuted its first turbine airliner, a Convair 540, a Convair 340 with the piston engines replaced by Napier Elands. When Rolls-Royce bought Napier it dropped the Eland, so 540s in the United States reverted to piston; Allegheny's last 540 flights were in 1962. The airline bought new Fairchild F-27Js that the company named "Vistaliner". The F-27J was a U.S.-built version of the Fokker F27. The airline switched to General Motors/Allison turboprops in the Convair 580 which the carrier named the "Vistacruiser"; the first CV580 flight was in June 1965. The last DC-3 flights were in 1962 and the last piston flights were in 1967.

In 1965, Allegheny announced it would add the first jet aircraft type to its fleet—the Douglas DC-9-10—which the airline stated would be placed into service in 1966. Allegheny then added other jets, notably the McDonnell Douglas DC-9-30, which the company named the "Vistajet". Later jets included Boeing 727-100s and 727-200s and McDonnell Douglas DC-9-50s. The Mohawk merger added British Aircraft Corporation BAC One-Eleven jets to the fleet as well. Allegheny Airlines was also the first airline with a network of affiliated regional airlines, the Allegheny Commuter system, which began with Henson Airlines in 1967.

As deregulation dawned, Allegheny, looking to shed its regional image, changed its name to USAir on October 28, 1979.

Revenue passenger-miles (millions)(sched. service only)
	Allegheny	Mohawk	Lake Central
1951	30	16	5
1955	56	49	17
1960	131	116	36
1965	289	348	95
1970	1683	566	(merged 1968)
1975	3272	(merged 1972)	

=== USAir and US Airways ===
After Allegheny Airlines rebranded itself as USAir, the company retained its earlier name for its Allegheny Commuter service until 1989 when it became USAir Express.

Under USAir, which eventually renamed itself US Airways, the Allegheny name continued to be used by the parent company, keeping the trademark under US Airways' control. Suburban Airlines was originally headquartered at the Reading Airport in Reading, Pennsylvania, and flew a large fleet of Short 330s and Short 360s, being the launch customer for the Short 360. It had three Fokker F27s, and was the last US operator of passenger F27s. After replacing much of its Short fleet with de Havilland Canada DHC-8 Dash 8s and retiring the F27s, Suburban merged with another wholly owned USAir subsidiary, Pennsylvania Airlines, which was headquartered at Harrisburg International Airport near Harrisburg, Pennsylvania. The combined airline retained the historic Allegheny Airlines name until it was merged with another wholly owned subsidiary, Piedmont Airlines. The subsequent airline retained the Piedmont Airlines name. After retiring earlier aircraft, Allegheny, before and after its mergers, mainly flew De Havilland Canada Dash 8s to 35 airports in the northeastern United States, and eventually Canada, from hubs at Boston and Philadelphia. Its activities and Activities Dash 8 fleet were incorporated into a regional airline, Piedmont Airlines, in 2004.

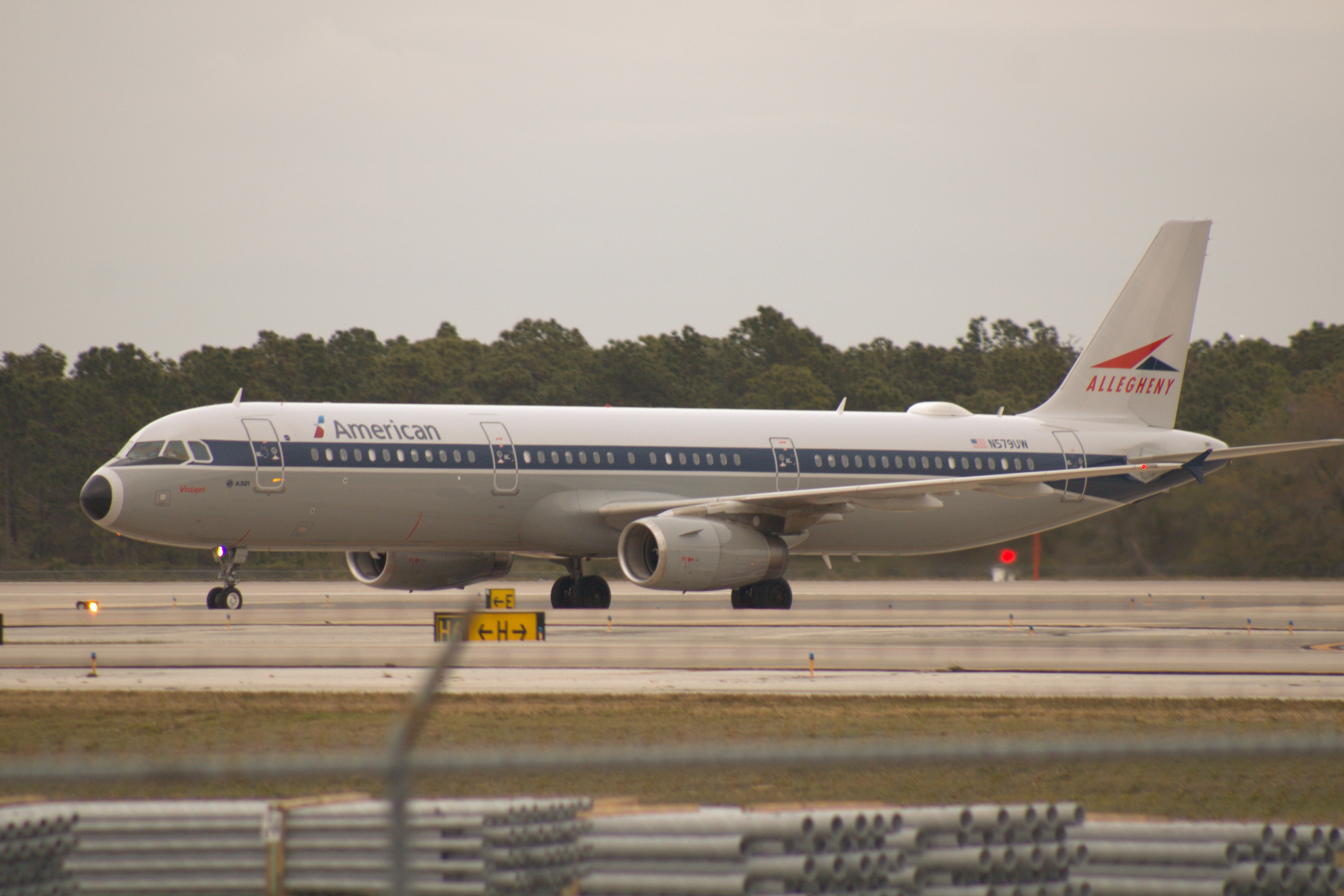
N579UW at Orlando International Airport in 2024

As of October 2023, an American Airlines Airbus A321, registered N579UW, is painted in Allegheny colors. It recently was on an Airbus A319 registered N745VJ, before being repainted into standard American livery in March 2023 and US Airways also operated this aircraft with a retro Allegheny Airlines paint scheme.

== Destinations ==
This is a list of cities served by Allegheny Airlines until October 1979. It does not include destinations served before that year. Allegheny flew to dozens more cities at some point, including Erie, Providence, and the Wyoming Valley.

=== Allegheny Airlines ===
- Akron, Ohio - Akron–Canton Airport
- Albany, New York – Albany County Airport
- Allentown, Pennsylvania – Allentown-Bethlehem-Easton International Airport
- Baltimore, Maryland – Baltimore–Washington International Airport
- Binghamton, New York – Broome County Airport
- Boston, Massachusetts – Logan International Airport
- Bradford, Pennsylvania – Bradford Regional Airport
- Bridgeport, Connecticut – Igor I. Sikorsky Memorial Airport
- Buffalo, New York – Greater Buffalo-Niagara Falls International Airport
- Burlington, Vermont – Burlington International Airport
- Charleston, West Virginia – Kanawha Airport
- Chicago, Illinois – O'Hare International Airport
- Cincinnati, Ohio – Greater Cincinnati International Airport
- Cleveland, Ohio – Hopkins International Airport
- Columbus, Ohio – Port Columbus International Airport
- Dayton, Ohio – James M. Cox International Airport
- Denver, Colorado – Stapleton International Airport
- Detroit, Michigan – Metro Airport
- DuBois, Pennsylvania – DuBois-Jefferson County Airport
- Elmira, New York – Chemung County Airport
- Erie, Pennsylvania – Erie International Airport
- Evansville, Indiana – Evansville Regional Airport
- Glens Falls, New York – Warren County Airport
- Hagerstown, Maryland – Hagerstown Regional Airport
- Harrisburg, Pennsylvania – Harrisburg International Airport
- Hartford, Connecticut – Bradley International Airport
- Huntington, West Virginia -Tri-State Airport
- Indianapolis, Indiana – Weir Cook Airport
- Islip, New York – Islip Airport
- Ithaca, New York – Tompkins County Airport
- Jamestown, New York – Chautauqua County-Jamestown Airport
- Keene, New Hampshire – Dillant–Hopkins Airport
- Kingsport, Tennessee – Tri-Cities Regional Airport
- Lawrenceville, Illinois - Lawrenceville-Vincennes International Airport
- Lima, Ohio – Lima Allen County Airport
- Lock Haven, Pennsylvania – William T. Piper Memorial Airport
- Louisville, Kentucky – Standiford Field
- Mansfield, Ohio – Mansfield Lahm Regional Airport
- Memphis, Tennessee – Memphis International Airport
- Minneapolis-St. Paul, Minnesota – Minneapolis-St. Paul International Airport
- Nashville, Tennessee – Berry Field
- Newark, New Jersey – Newark International Airport
- New Haven, Connecticut – Tweed New Haven Airport
- New Orleans, Louisiana – Moisant Field
- New York, New York – John F. Kennedy International Airport
- New York, New York – LaGuardia Airport
- Norfolk, Virginia - Norfolk International Airport
- Omaha, Nebraska – Eppley Airfield
- Parkersburg, West Virginia – Wood County Airport
- Philadelphia, Pennsylvania – Philadelphia International Airport
- Phoenix, Arizona – Sky Harbor International Airport
- Pittsburgh, Pennsylvania – Greater Pittsburgh International Airport
- Portsmouth, Ohio - Greater Portsmouth Regional Airport
- Providence, Rhode Island – Theodore Francis Green State Airport
- Rochester, New York – Greater Rochester International Airport
- St. Louis, Missouri – Lambert Field
- Syracuse, New York – Hancock International Airport
- Toledo, Ohio – Toledo Express Airport
- Trenton, New Jersey – Trenton–Mercer Airport
- Utica, New York – Oneida County Airport
- Washington, District of Columbia – Washington National Airport
- Wheeling, West Virginia - Wheeling Ohio County Airport
- Wilkes Barre, Pennsylvania – Wilkes-Barre/Scranton International Airport
- Williamsport, Pennsylvania – Williamsport Regional Airport
- Wilmington, Delaware – New Castle Airport
- Worcester, Massachusetts – Worcester Regional Airport
- York, Pennsylvania – Olmstead State Airport
- Youngstown, Ohio – Youngstown–Warren Regional Airport
- Zanesville, Ohio – Zanesville Municipal Airport

=== Canada ===
- Montreal, Quebec – Montreal International Airport
- Toronto, Ontario – Toronto International Airport

=== Allegheny Commuter ===
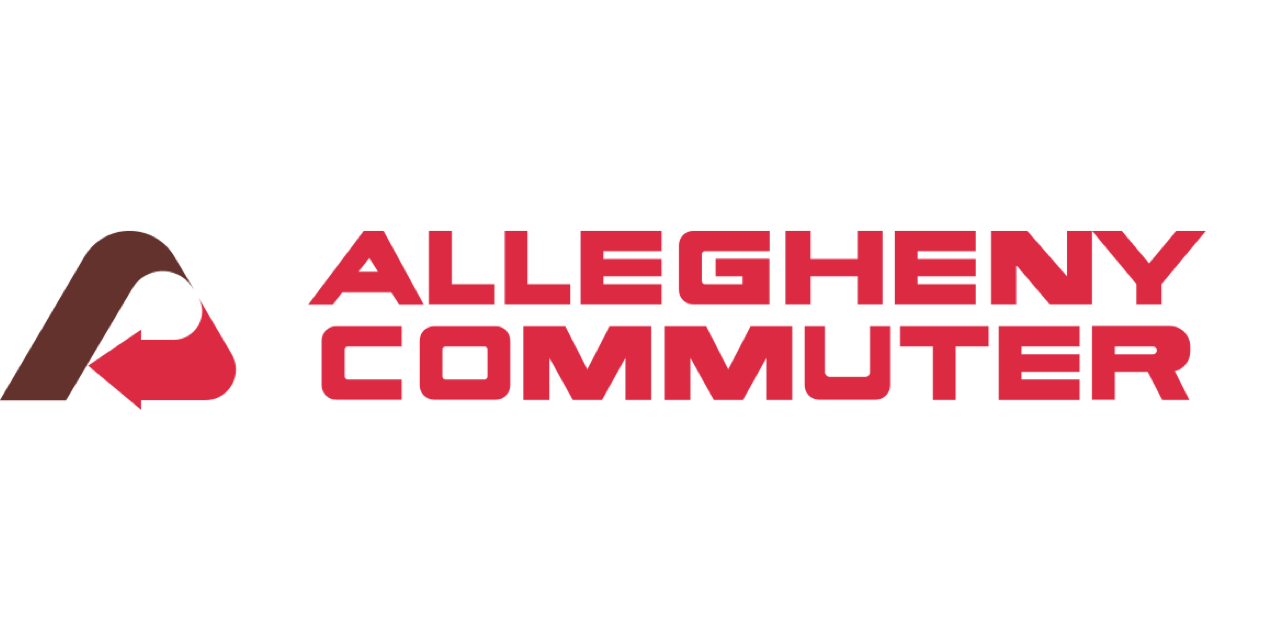

- Albany, New York – Albany County Airport
- Allentown, Pennsylvania – Lehigh Valley International Airport
- Altoona, Pennsylvania – Altoona–Blair County Airport
- Atlantic City, New Jersey – Bader Field
- Bloomington, Indiana – Monroe County Airport
- Boston, Massachusetts – Logan International Airport
- Burlington, Vermont – Burlington International Airport
- Charleston, West Virginia – Kanawha Airport
- Charlottesville, Virginia – Charlottesville-Albemarle Airport
- Clarksburg, West Virginia – North Central West Virginia Airport
- Clarksville, Tennessee -- Clarksville - Montgomery County Regional Airport
- Cleveland, Ohio – Cleveland Hopkins International Airport
- Danville, Illinois – Vermilion Regional Airport
- Dubois, Pennsylvania – DuBois Regional Airport
- Elkins, West Virginia – Elkins Randolph County Airport
- Flint, Michigan -- Bishop International Airport
- Franklin, Pennsylvania – Chess Lamberton Field
- Galion, Ohio – Galion Municipal Airport
- Glens Falls, New York – Warren County Airport
- Hagerstown, Maryland – Hagerstown Regional Airport
- Harrisburg, Pennsylvania – Harrisburg International Airport
- Hartford, Connecticut – Bradley International Airport
- Hazleton, Pennsylvania – Hazleton Municipal Airport
- Islip, New York – Long Island MacArthur Airport
- Jamestown, New York -- Chatauqua County/Jamestown Airport
- Johnstown, Pennsylvania – Cambria County Airport
- Lafayette, Indiana – Purdue University Airport
- Lancaster, Pennsylvania – Lancaster Airport
- London-Corbin, Kentucky -- London-Corbin Airport
- Lynchburg, Virginia – Preston Glenn Field
- Manchester, New Hampshire – Manchester-Boston Regional Airport
- Mansfield, Ohio – Mansfield Municipal Airport
- Massena, New York – Richards Field
- Millville, New Jersey – Millville Airport
- Morgantown, West Virginia – Walter L. Hart Field
- Mount Vernon, Illinois -- Mount Vernon Airport
- Muncie, Indiana – Johnson Field
- Nashville, Tennessee -- Nashville International Airport
- Newark, New Jersey – Newark Liberty International Airport
- New London, Connecticut – Trumbull Airport
- New York, New York – JFK Airport and La Guardia Airport
- North Philadelphia, Pennsylvania – Northeast Philadelphia Airport
- Ocala, Florida – Ocala International Airport
- Ogdensburg, New York – Ogdensburg International Airport
- Owensboro, Kentucky -- Owensboro-Daviess County Regional Airport
- Paducah, Kentucky -- Barkley Regional Airport
- Plattsburgh, New York – Plattsburgh Airport
- Pittsburgh, Pennsylvania – Greater Pittsburgh International Airport
- Portland, Maine – Portland International Jetport
- Providence, Rhode Island – T.F. Green Airport
- Reading, Pennsylvania – General Spaatz Airport
- Rutland, Vermont – Rutland State Airport
- Salisbury, Maryland – Wicomico Regional Airport
- Saranac Lake, New York – Saranac Lake Airport
- State College, Pennsylvania -Mid State Airport
- Syracuse, New York – Syracuse Hancock International Airport
- Terre Haute, Indiana – Hulman Field
- Trenton, New Jersey – Mercer County Airport
- Vero Beach, Florida -- Vero Beach Regional Airport
- Watertown, New York – Watertown Airport
- Wildwood/Cape May, New Jersey – Cape May County Airport
- Wilkes-Barre/Scranton, Pennsylvania – Wilkes-Barre/Scranton International Airport

== Historic fleet ==
Allegheny Airlines fleet
Aircraft	From	To	Number
Douglas DC-3	1953	1966	24
Martin 2-0-2	1955	1966	18
Convair 540	1959	1963	5
Convair 340	1960	1967	17
Convair 440	1962	1974	27
Fairchild F-27J / Fokker F27	1965	1974	27
Convair 580	1965	1978	40
McDonnell Douglas DC-9-30	1966	1979	89
McDonnell Douglas DC-9-50	1974	1978	8
Nord 262	1968	1977	13
Boeing 727-200	1970	1971	2
Boeing 727-100	1978	1979	11
British Aircraft Corp. BAC One-Eleven	1972	1979	31
Mohawk 298 (Nord 262 version)	1975	1979	9

== Photographic gallery ==
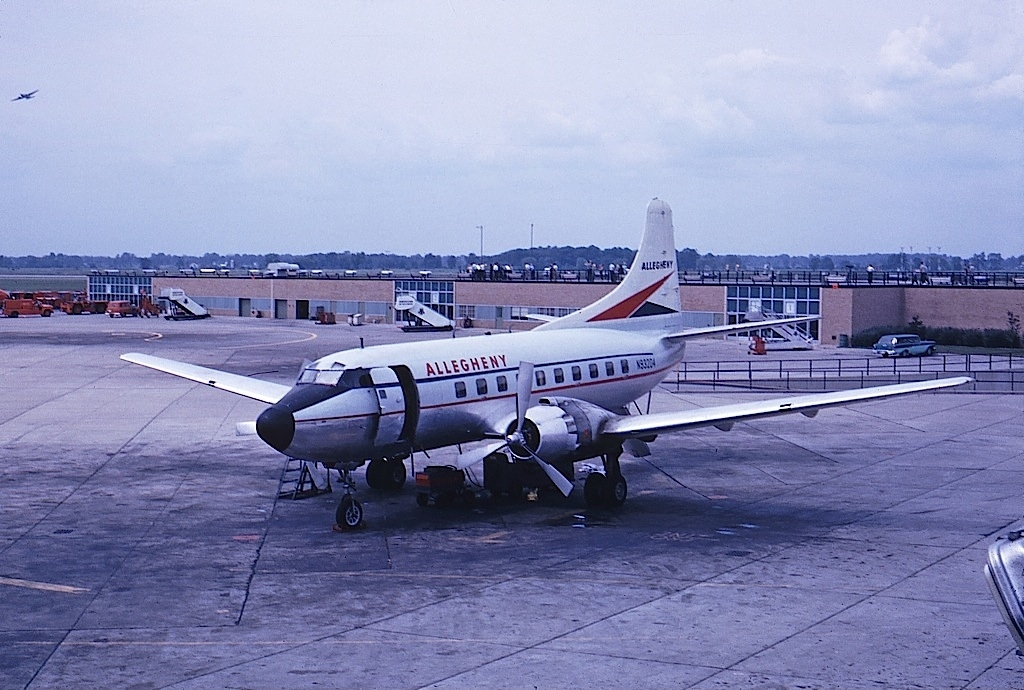
Martin 202A

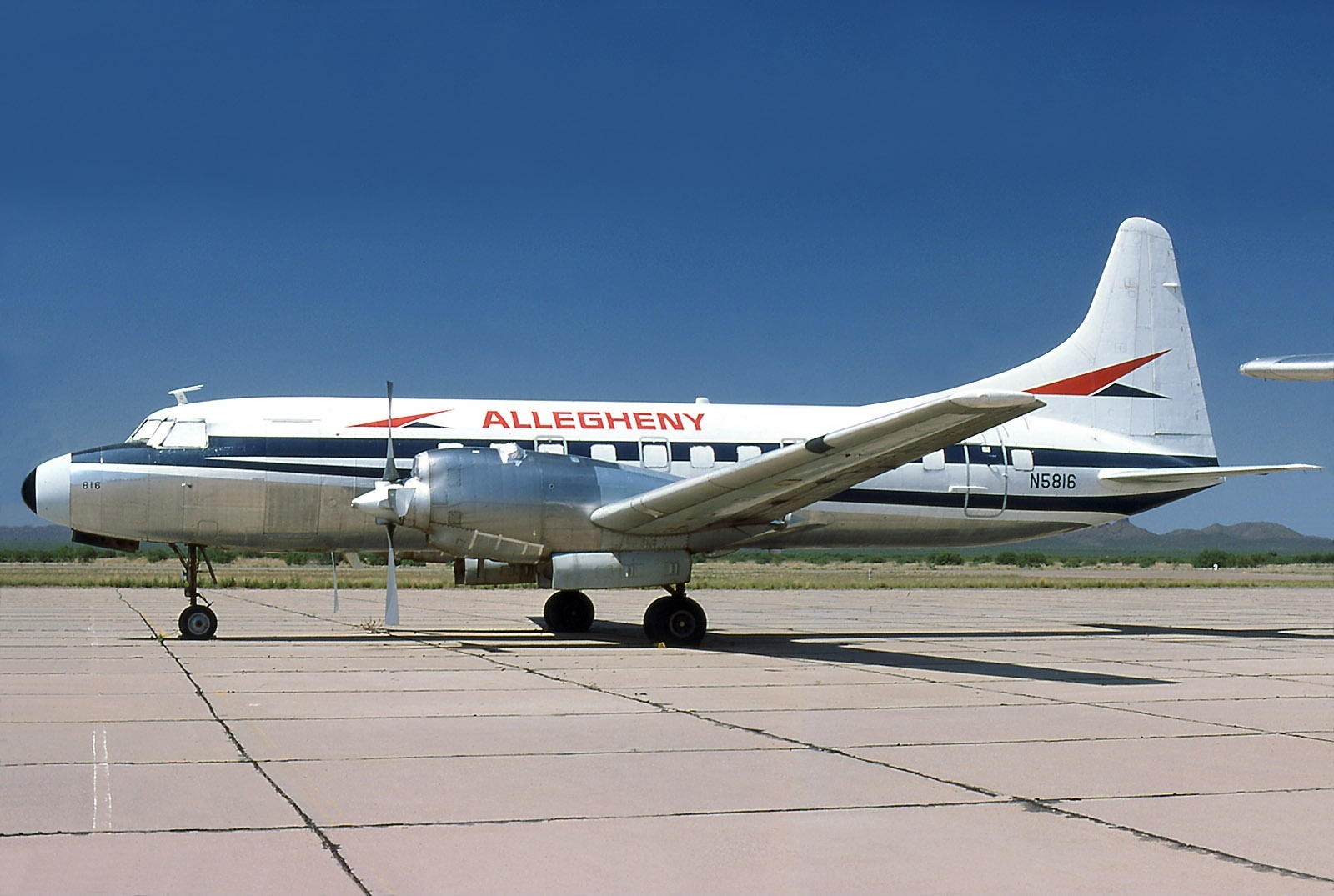
Convair 580

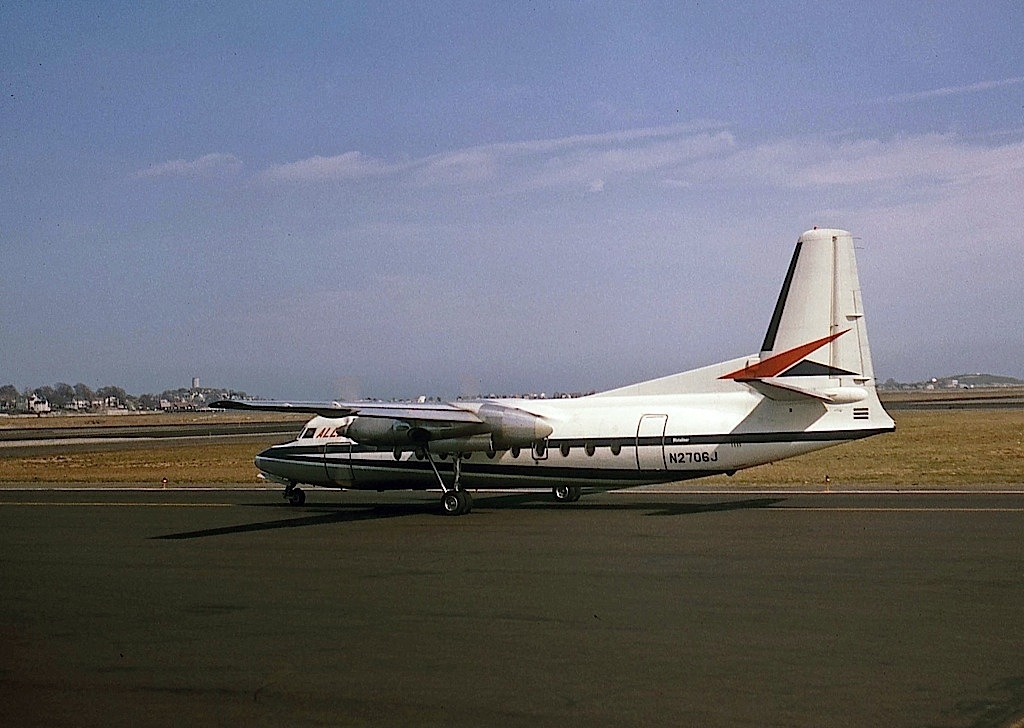
Fairchild FH.27J

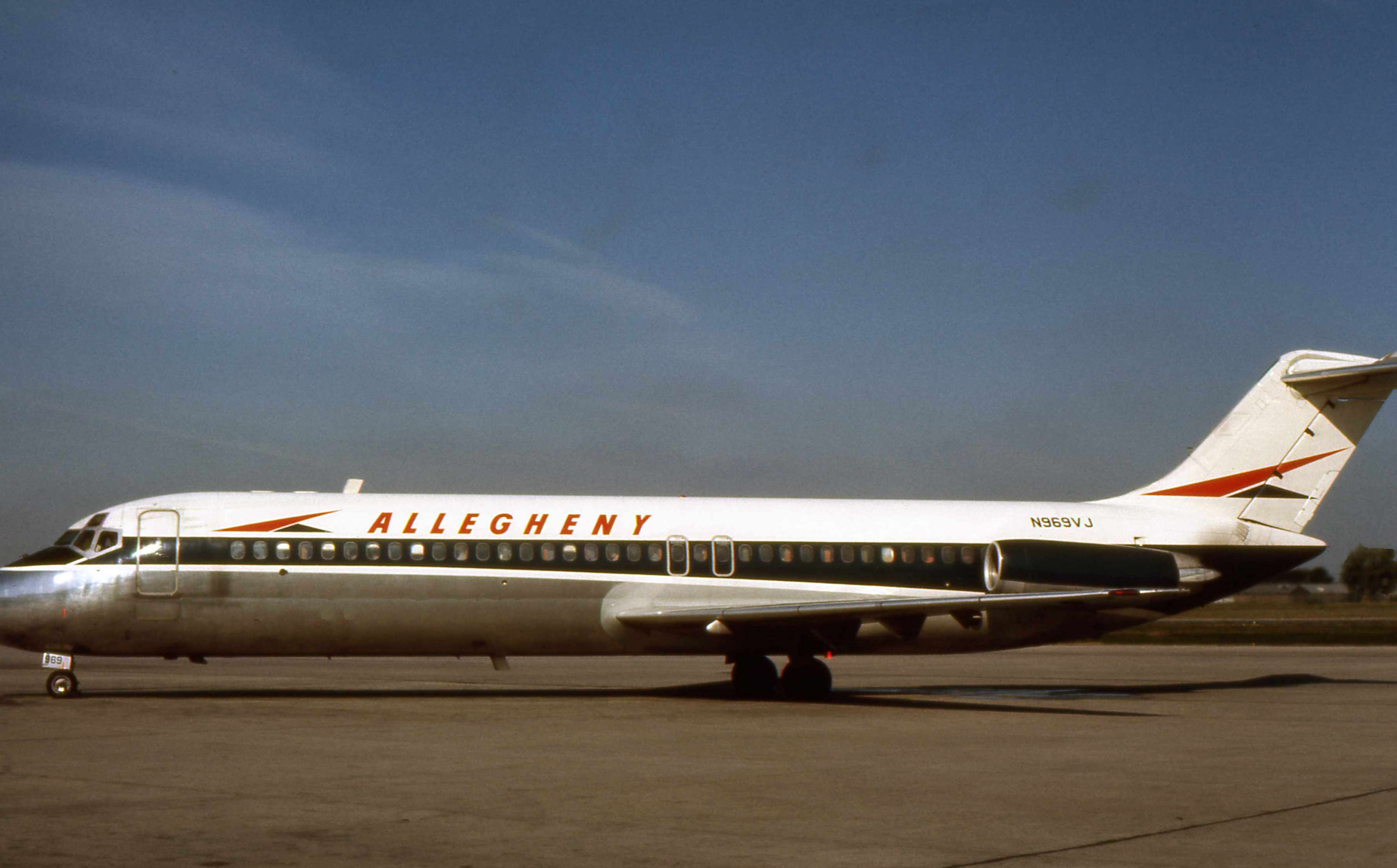
Douglas DC 9-31

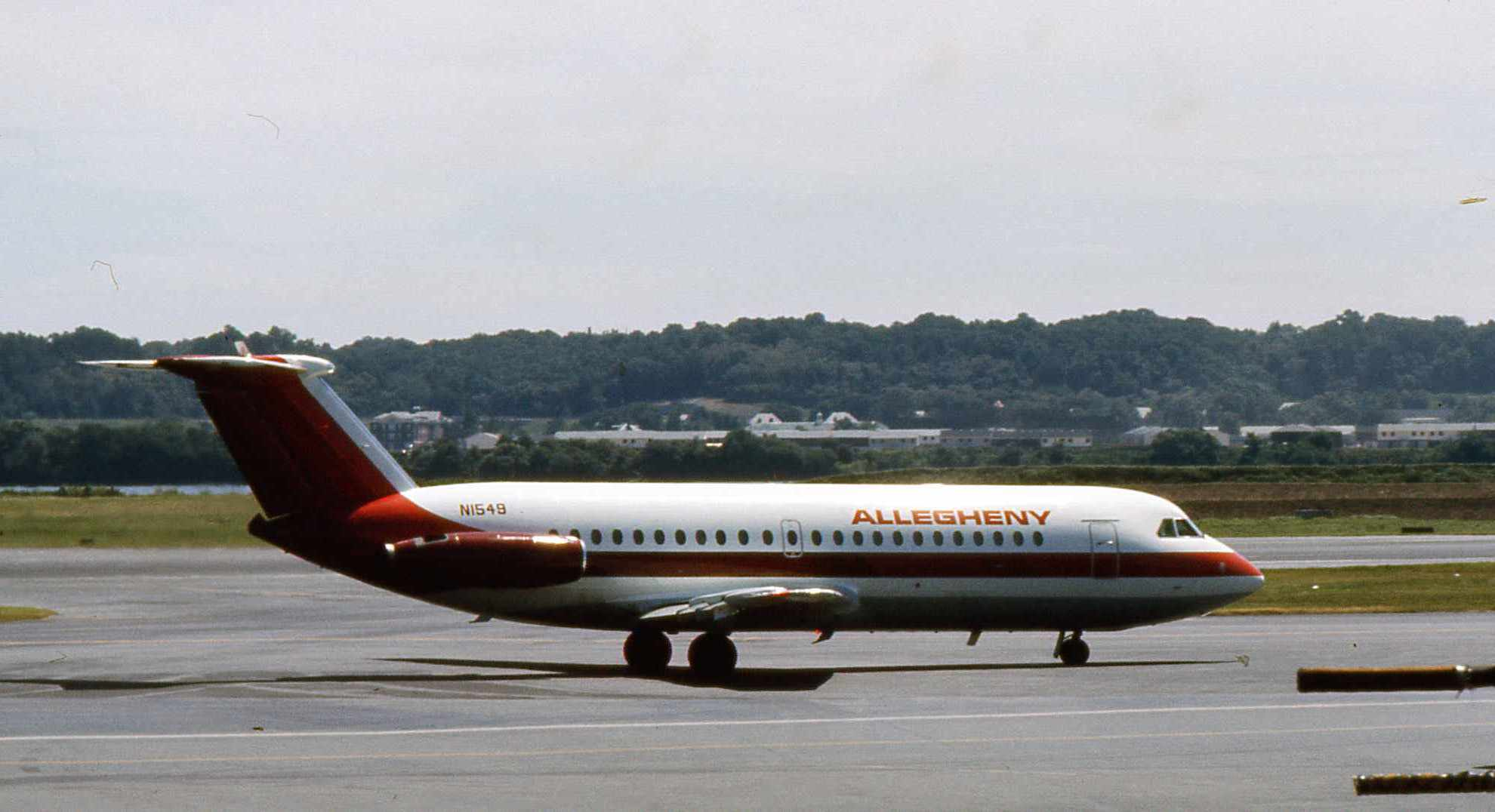
BAC 1-11

Allegheny also briefly operated Douglas DC-9-10 aircraft. American Airlines introduced an Airbus A321 in Allegheny Airlines retro livery in late 2023, with the aircraft remaining in service at least through September 2025.

== Accidents and incidents ==
- On November 14, 1955, an Allegheny Airlines Martin 2-0-2 was undertaking training flights at Wilmington Airport in New Castle County, Delaware, when the No. 1 engine caught fire during a single engine approach. On landing, the left main landing gear collapsed, and the aircraft was withdrawn from service and used for spare parts.
- On December 1, 1959, Allegheny Airlines Flight 371, a Martin 2-0-2, crashed into a mountain on approach to Williamsport, Pennsylvania, United States. There were 25 fatalities.
- On October 19, 1962, an Allegheny Airlines flight attendant, Françoise de Moriere, fell to her death after being blown out a Convair 440 emergency exit door on a flight from Washington, D.C., to Providence, Rhode Island, during a scheduled descent into Hartford, Connecticut. This incident inspired James Dickey's poem "Falling".
- On November 2, 1963, an Allegheny Airlines Martin 2-0-2 was damaged beyond repair under unknown circumstances while taxiing at Newark International Airport.
- On July 23, 1965, Allegheny Airlines Flight 604 crashed northeast of the Williamsport Regional Airport due to a right engine failure and subsequent failure to follow engine out procedures by the flight crew. None of the 40 occupants on board were killed, but 23 were injured.
- On November 29, 1966, Allegheny Airlines Flight 305, operated by a Convair 440, suffered a complete electrical failure on takeoff from Capital City Airport in Harrisburg, Pennsylvania. The pilots attempted to abort the takeoff, but the reversers did not work, and the aircraft overran the runway, striking an approach light tower. The cause of the failure was later determined to be an improperly installed heater.
- On December 24, 1968, Allegheny Airlines Flight 736, a Convair 580, crashed on approach to Bradford, Pennsylvania, killing 20 of the 47 people on board.
- On January 6, 1969, Allegheny Airlines Flight 737, a Convair 580, also crashed on approach to Bradford, Pennsylvania, killing 11 of the 28 people on board.
- On September 9, 1969, Allegheny Airlines Flight 853, a DC-9 en route from Cincinnati to Indianapolis, collided with a small private plane and crashed into a soybean field southeast of Indianapolis, near Shelbyville, Indiana, killing all 83 people aboard both aircraft.
- On June 7, 1971, Allegheny Airlines Flight 485, a Convair 580, en route from Washington, D.C., to New Haven, Connecticut (via New London, Connecticut) crashed short of the runway at New Haven. 26 passengers and two crew members were killed; two passengers and one crew member survived. Pilot error was the cause of the crash.
- On June 23, 1976, Allegheny Airlines Flight 121, a DC-9, crashed on the runway due to windshear at Philadelphia International Airport. There were 86 injuries and no fatalities.
- On July 9, 1978, Allegheny Airlines Flight 453 crash-landed at Greater Rochester International Airport while arriving from Boston Logan International Airport. The BAC-111 aircraft was carrying 77 people, and there was one serious injury.
- On February 12, 1979, Allegheny Airlines Flight 561, a Nord 262 bound for Washington-National Airport crashed shortly after takeoff from North Central West Virginia Airport because of snow on the aircraft's wing and empennage surfaces. Two died out of the 25 passengers and crew on board.

== See also ==
- Air transportation in the United States
- List of defunct airlines of the United States
