= Shelby Community Airport =

- IATA: none; ICAO: none; FAA LID: 12G

Summary
- Airport type: Public use
- Owner: Shelby Airport LLC
- Serves: Shelby, Ohio
- Elevation AMSL: 1,120 ft / 341 m
- Coordinates: 40°52′22″N 082°41′51″W
- Website: ShelbyAirport.com

Map
- Location of airport in Ohio 12G (the United States)

Runways
Direction	Length		Surface
Direction	ft	m	Surface
18/36	3,174	967	Asphalt
3/21	1,890	576	Turf

Statistics (2010)
- Aircraft operations: 2,012
- Based aircraft: 12
- Source: Federal Aviation Administration

Shelby Community Airport (FAA LID: 12G) is a privately owned, public use airport located two nautical miles (4 km) west of the central business district of Shelby, in Richland County, Ohio, United States.

== History ==
After initially trying and failing to start an airport at three different Ohio towns, brothers and Army Air Force veterans Montford and William Fischer stopped in Sidney. The supportive attitude they received from citizens motivated them to break ground on Sky Haven Airport on 51 acres (21 ha) of land there on 6 April 1948. The airport was accredited by the VA to accept G.I. Bill students two months later.

Cleland Windgart founded the American Tower Company at the airport in 1951. The Fischer brothers announced they would relocate to Galion-Crestline Airport in March 1952. By late May 1952, the airport had been purchased by the company, which began improvements.

By mid September 1959, a 2,600-foot (790 m) paved runway was under construction.

By early November 1964, the facility was being referred to as the Shelby Community Airport. A five-unit hangar was under construction in September 1965.

Shel-Aire took over operation of the airport in late 1970 and built a new 5,040-square-foot (468 m^{2}) hangar that November. A community fund drive led to the repaving and lengthening of the runway 3,400 feet (1,000 m) in fall 1972.

In December 1975, the airport was leased to Mansfield Airways who, despite offering a charter service, sought to gain access to a 6,400-square-foot (590 m^{2}) maintenance hangar.

== Facilities and aircraft ==
Shelby Community Airport covers an area of 50 acres (20 ha) at an elevation of 1,120 feet (341 m) above mean sea level. It has two runways: 18/36 is 3,174 by 50 feet (967 x 15 m) with an asphalt surface and 3/21 is 1,890 by 125 feet (576 x 38 m) with a turf surface.

The airport does not have a fixed-base operator, and no fuel is available.

For the 12-month period ending July 19, 2010, the airport had 2,012 aircraft operations, an average of 167 per month: 99% general aviation and 1% air taxi. At that time there were 12 aircraft based at this airport: 92% single-engine and 8% ultralight.

== Accidents and incidents ==
- On 5 March 1950, an Aeronca crashed after hitting a power pole on takeoff at the airport, severely damaging the airplane.
- On 17 May 1968, a Cessna 150 crashed while performing takeoffs and landings at the airport, killing the pilot.
- On 12 June 2005, an ultralight crashed after taking off from the airport, killing the pilot and injuring a passenger.
- On May 9, 2007, a Cessna 172 Skyhawk crashed while landing at the Shelby Community Runway when it departed the end of the runway, crossed a road, and nosed over in a ditch. The pilot reported he touched down halfway down the runway and did not have sufficient length to stop. The probable cause of the accident was found to be the pilot's failure to properly achieve the correct touch down point .

== See also ==
- List of airports in Ohio
