= Allegheny Airlines Flight 737 =

1969 aviation accident

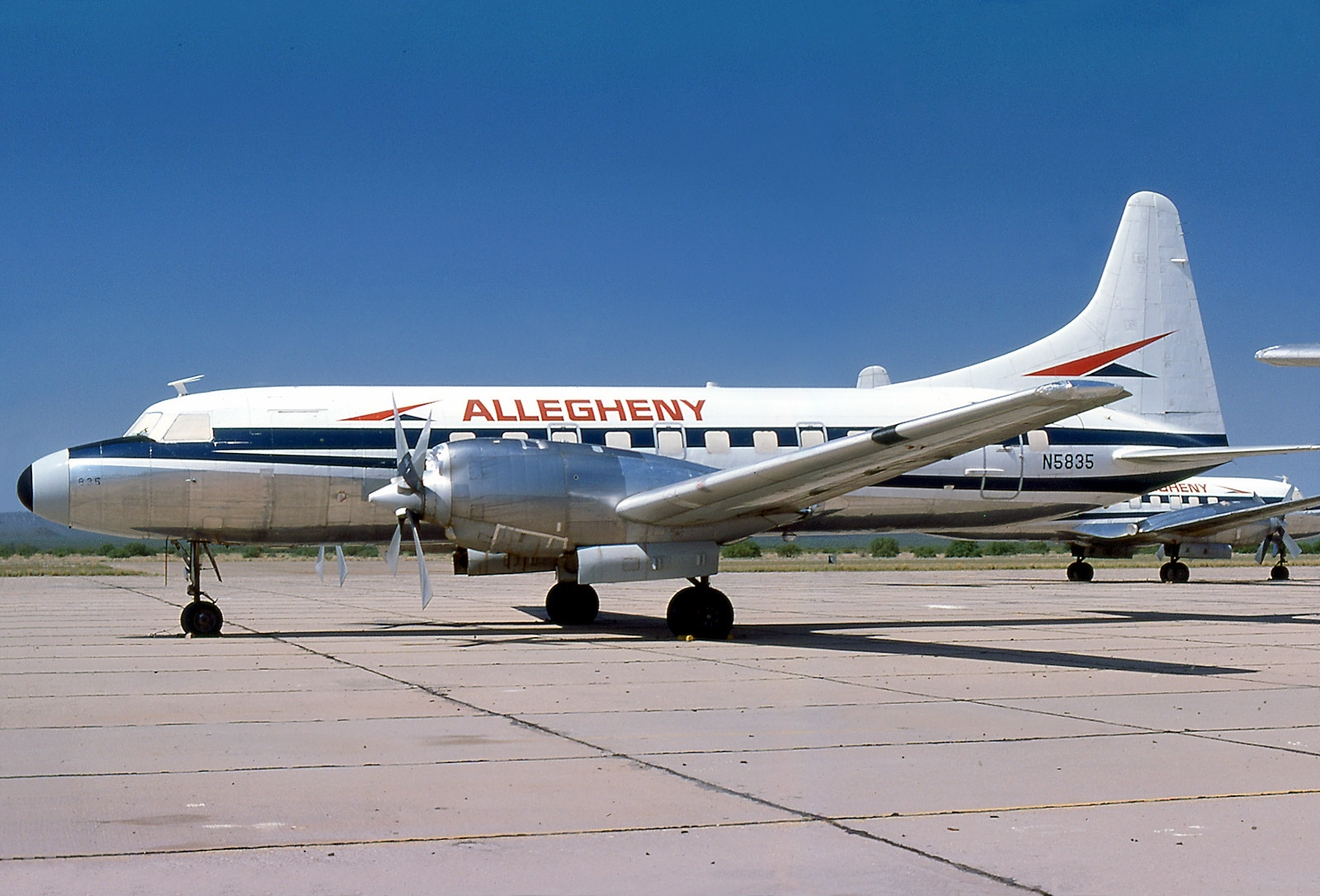
- A Convair 580 similar to the one involved

Occurrence
- Date: January 6, 1969
- Summary: Undetermined; presumably controlled flight into terrain
- Site: Lafayette Township, McKean County, near Bradford Regional Airport, Bradford, Pennsylvania; 41.8631088°N 78.7233006°W

Aircraft
- Aircraft type: Convair CV-580
- Operator: Allegheny Airlines
- Registration: N5825
- Flight origin: Washington D.C.
- Stopover: Harrisburg International Airport
- Destination: Bradford Regional Airport
- Occupants: 28
- Passengers: 25
- Crew: 3
- Fatalities: 11
- Injuries: 17
- Survivors: 17

Allegheny Airlines Flight 737 was a Convair CV-580 (aircraft registration N5825), that crashed while attempting to land at Bradford Regional Airport in Bradford, Pennsylvania on January 6, 1969. Eleven of the 28 occupants on board were killed.

== Aircraft and crew ==
The flight was operated using a Convair CV-580 that was originally certificated as a Convair CV-440 on July 11, 1967, but was modified to include upgraded turbine engines and propellers and re-certificated as a CV-580. The aircraft had accumulated a total of 27,285 flight hours at the time of the accident. The flight crew consisted of Captain William I. Blanton Jr. (33), and First Officer Ronald Lesiak (31).

== Flight ==
Flight 737 took off from Washington D.C. bound for Detroit, Michigan with intermediate stops in Harrisburg, Bradford, and Erie, Pennsylvania. The flight was uneventful until the aircraft began its approach to Bradford. Weather was overcast with one and one half miles visibility and snow showers. At ten miles from the airport, Flight 737 requested and received clearance to make its instrument approach to runway 14 instead of runway 32. The flight struck treetops just under five nautical miles from the airport before coming to rest upside down on a snow-covered golf course.

== Cause ==
The National Transportation Safety Board (NTSB) was unable to determine the probable cause of the crash. "Of the approximately 13 potential causes examined by the Board, three remained after final analysis: (1) misreading of the altimeter by the captain, (2) a malfunction of the captain’s altimeter following completion of the instrument approach procedure turn, and (3) misinterpretation of the instrument approach chart. Of these three, no single one can be accepted or rejected to the exclusion of another based on the available evidence."

== Aftermath ==
Less than two weeks before flight 737 crashed, Allegheny Airlines Flight 736 also went down on approach to Bradford Airport on the same Detroit-Washington DC route via Erie, Bradford and Harrisburg. Both aircraft were approaching the same runway at Bradford, but in opposite directions at the time of the crashes. Shortly after Flight 737's crash, Allegheny Airlines self-imposed new rules for landings at airports. The rules required visibility of 1,000 feet up and three miles out for any airport without instrument landing systems. Allegheny cancelled 124 out of 1,409 scheduled flight segments in the first week after the new visibility rules were adopted.
