= Galion Municipal Airport =

- IATA: GQQ; ICAO: KGQQ; FAA LID: GQQ

Summary
- Airport type: Public
- Owner: City of Galion
- Serves: Galion, Ohio
- Location: Crawford County, Ohio
- Time zone: UTC−05:00 (-5)
  - Summer (DST): UTC−04:00 (-4)
- Elevation AMSL: 1,224 ft (373 m)
- Coordinates: 40°45′12″N 082°43′26″W

Map
- Location in Ohio GQQ (the United States)

Runways
Direction	Length		Surface
Direction	ft	m	Surface
5/23	3,505	1,068	Asphalt

Statistics (2021)
- Aircraft operations: 6,188
- Based aircraft: 13
- Source: Federal Aviation Administration

Galion Municipal Airport (IATA: GQQ, ICAO: KGQQ, FAA LID: GQQ) is three miles northeast of Galion in Crawford County, Ohio. The FAA's National Plan of Integrated Airport Systems for 2009–2013 classified it as a general aviation airport.

The airport is home to a chapter of the Experimental Aircraft Association, which hosts social and educational activities for its members. Some activities include Young Eagles rallies, fly-ins, building seminars, and more. The chapter hosts a regular All About Aviation Day, where visitors can meet pilots, instructors, and other personnel and see aircraft, drones, and RC Aircraft.

== History ==
Efforts to replace the existing airport in Galion began in February 1945, when it was proposed by Paul E. Nollen, the executive vice president of a local savings and loan association. The existing airport, located west of the city, was too close to it and had limited possibility for growth. An 86-acre (35 ha) site – one of five considered – was approved by the state in May 1946. The following month, a group of local leaders announced plans to fund the airport through the sale of stock in a non-profit corporation. However, before the corporation was organized in November, the decision was made to change to a for-profit venture. The first plane to land at the airport touched down on 19 September 1947. Although formal dedication would not occur until later, the Galion-Crestline Airport officially opened on 12 December 1949. It featured a 2,300 ft (700 m) long northeast-southwest runway, an 1,800 ft (550 m) north-south runway, a six airplane hangar and an administration building.

To enable the airport to be eligible for federal funds, the deed to the airport was transferred to the city in mid February 1950. This was followed, almost exactly one year later, by the announcement that Montford and William Fischer would be taking over its operation from Arthur D. Schreck. Then, in March 1952, the brothers revealed that they would be relocating to the site from Sky Haven Airport in Shelby. Work to pave 2,000 feet (610 m) of the northeast-southwest runway began in June 1952. A 10-year lease of the airport was authorized by the city council in June 1953. However, improper construction and poor drainage resulted in the deterioration of the runway surface by late November 1955. To remedy the situation, the airport received a federal grant in February 1956. An immediately adjacent restaurant, the Fairway Club, burned down in November 1957. In preparation for a 1,000 ft (300 m) runway extension, an additional 71-acre (29 ha) of land was purchased by the airport in January 1958. The name of the facility was changed to Galion Municipal Airport in early September 1960.

By late May 1966, the airport had 16 t-hangars and a 4,500-square-foot (420 m^{2}) shop. A flying club, the United Flyers of Ohio, or UFO, was established in mid 1967. Work on a project to extend the runway to 3,500 feet (1,100 m) began a few weeks later in August. The airport began planning to apply for a state grant to add an additional 500 feet (150 m) in December 1968. In the meantime, GCS Airlines had incorporated as two different companies: Fischer Brothers Aviation, which operated passenger flights and GCS Air Service, which handled cargo. (Note: GCS was short for Galion Commuter Service.) In January 1969, 10,800-square-foot (1,000 m^{2}), nine unit hangar was built and GCS took over service between Cleveland and Mansfield, Ohio from Allegheny Airlines in early July. By the end of the month the road to the east of the airport was being relocated to the west side of the field.

The airport transported more cargo than any other similar size airport in the world in 1972. A four unit hangar and two airplanes at the airport were destroyed or seriously damaged by a tornado on 13 August 1975. Funds for a federal grant to build a 2,000-foot (610 m) parallel taxiway and expand the ramp were allocated in March 1979. Less than six months later a 400-foot (120 m) extension to the runway was already being considered. Fischer Brothers Aviation had purchased two or three CASA 212s by late September 1980 to replace two of its de Havilland Herons. Three years later, it added a Short 360. By mid July 1985, the number of flights had declined and a flight school had closed due to poor economic conditions. The airport received a federal grant that month to buy nearby property and repave the runway. Fischer Aviation became part of the Northwest Orient network in February 1986. Following a fatal crash at Detroit Metropolitan Airport, the company was sold to Midway Airlines in May 1987.

By early July 1992, GCS, which had continued after the closure of Fisher Aviation, no longer owned aircraft and operated only trucks. In late September 1992, the airport ran out of both automobile and aviation fuel as five underground storage tanks failed to meet EPA requirements for leak monitoring. Although a workaround was found by the end of the next month, a dispute arose between GCS and the city over who owned the tanks and was therefore responsible for their removal or replacement. By March 1994, the city was considering taking legal action to force GCS to pay for it. The situation was resolved the August of the following year when the operator reached an agreement to sell the airport and its facilities to the city. By early September 1998, construction had begun on two new hangars.

As a result of annexations, the airport was inside the city limits by late April 2001. By mid August 2007, a master plan was being considered. The runway and apron were resurfaced in 2008.

The airport received a $1.35 million grant to maintain the structural integrity of its main runway in July 2021 and a $22,000 federal grant in August to offset the cost of the effects of the COVID-19 pandemic.

== Facilities and aircraft ==
The airport covers 152 acres (62 ha) at an elevation of 1,224 feet (373 m). Its runway, designated as runway 5/23, measures 3,504 by 75 feet (1,068 x 23 m).

The airport has a fixed-base operator that provides fuel and limited amenities.

For the 12-month period ending September 1, 2021, the airport had 6,188 aircraft operations, an average of 119 per week. This was nearly 100% general aviation and <1% military. For the same time period, 13 aircraft were based at the airport, all single-engine airplanes.

== Accidents and incidents ==
- On 18 February 1988, a Piper overturned while landing at the airport, damaging the airplane.
- On 1 February 1989, a Cessna 172 crashed after performing a touch-and-go landing at the airport.
- On November 8, 2009, a Cessna 150 crashed while practicing landings at Galion Municipal Airport. A student pilot performed two landings at the airport with a flight instructor aboard the airplane before the student pilot attempted a solo landing on runway 23. Upon touchdown during the solo flight, the airplane turned into the wind and veered off the left side of the runway where it struck a visual approach slope indicator. The probable cause of the accident was found to be the student pilot's failure to maintain directional control.
- On August 7, 2012, an experimental amateur-built Starduster Too SA300 was substantially damaged when it impacted terrain during climbout from an aborted landing at Galion Municipal Airport. The pilot stated that the purpose of the flight was to run the engine and to practice landings. During an approach to Galion, the descent to runway 23 was "a little fast," and the pilot added "a little power" on short final. After the airplane touched down, it turned "sharply" to the left. The pilot applied engine power to execute an aborted landing, during which the airplane was flying "slower" than he thought, and it would not climb. When the pilot lowered the nose to gain speed, the pilot saw that the airplane was heading further south than he thought and was heading for the airport hangars, so he turned the airplane left to avoid the hangars, but it was headed for a power line. The pilot attempted to use the remaining airspeed to climb over the power line, but the airplane stalled and impacted the ground. The probable cause of the accident was found to be the pilot's failure to maintain directional control and a proper pitch attitude and airspeed while performing an aborted landing.
- On February 13, 2014, a Cessna 150 landed in a field near Galion Municipal Airport after departure. The aircraft had just taken off when the engine lost power. The pilot attempted to land the plane in a field but hit a snow bank.
- On May 29, 2014, a Luscombe 8B crashed while landing at Galion Municipal Airport. The pilot performed a 3-point landing in the tailwheel-equipped airplane. At about 20 mph or less, the airplane swerved slightly left; the pilot corrected the swerve with the application of right rudder and brake. The pilot then reported that he added left brake to stop before turning onto a taxiway. The airplane's tail came up and the airplane nosed over, coming to rest inverted. The probable cause of the accident was found to be the pilot's misapplication of brakes after landing, which resulted in the airplane nosing over.
- On May 25, 2015, a Cessna 182 crashed during landing at the Galion Municipal Airport. During the final approach, the pilot reported encountering turbulence and wind gusts. As the airplane crossed the runway threshold, the indicated airspeed reduced to 65 miles per hour, the stall warning horn sounded, and the airplane stalled. The pilot pushed the nose forward to regain control, but the airplane impacted the runway hard causing substantial damage to the firewall. The probable cause of the accident was found to be the pilot's failure to maintain adequate airspeed on final approach, which resulted in an in-flight loss of control and hard landing.
- On August 6, 2018, a Tango XR experimental aircraft was damaged while landing at the Mansfield airport. The pilot reported that the airplane bounced multiple times while landing; when he applied engine power to go around, the left wing dropped, and the airplane "veered" left and dropped to the ground. The airplane touched down in the grass to the left of the runway, the nose landing gear collapsed, and the airplane nosed over. The probable cause of the accident was found to be the pilot’s exceedance of the airplane’s critical angle of attack during a go-around, which resulted in an aerodynamic stall.
- On September 9, 2022, a Ercoupe 415 crashed after takeoff from Galion. The student pilot onboard reported a normal pre-departure engine runup and subsequently initiated a normal takeoff, which was uneventful. After coming airborne, however, the engine began to lose power after reaching 300 feet above the ground. The student lowered the nose to maintain 65 knots and tried to turn back towards the airport. After doing so, the engine lost complete power, and the student decided they were too high to land on the runway. The student overflew the airport in an attempt to land on a nearby road, but the aircraft hit a powerline pole, descended, and came to rest on the road. Postaccident examination of the engine following recovery of the airplane revealed an exhaust valve for one of the cylinders was stuck open.

== See also ==
- List of airports in Ohio
