= Allegheny Airlines Flight 736 =

1968 aviation accident

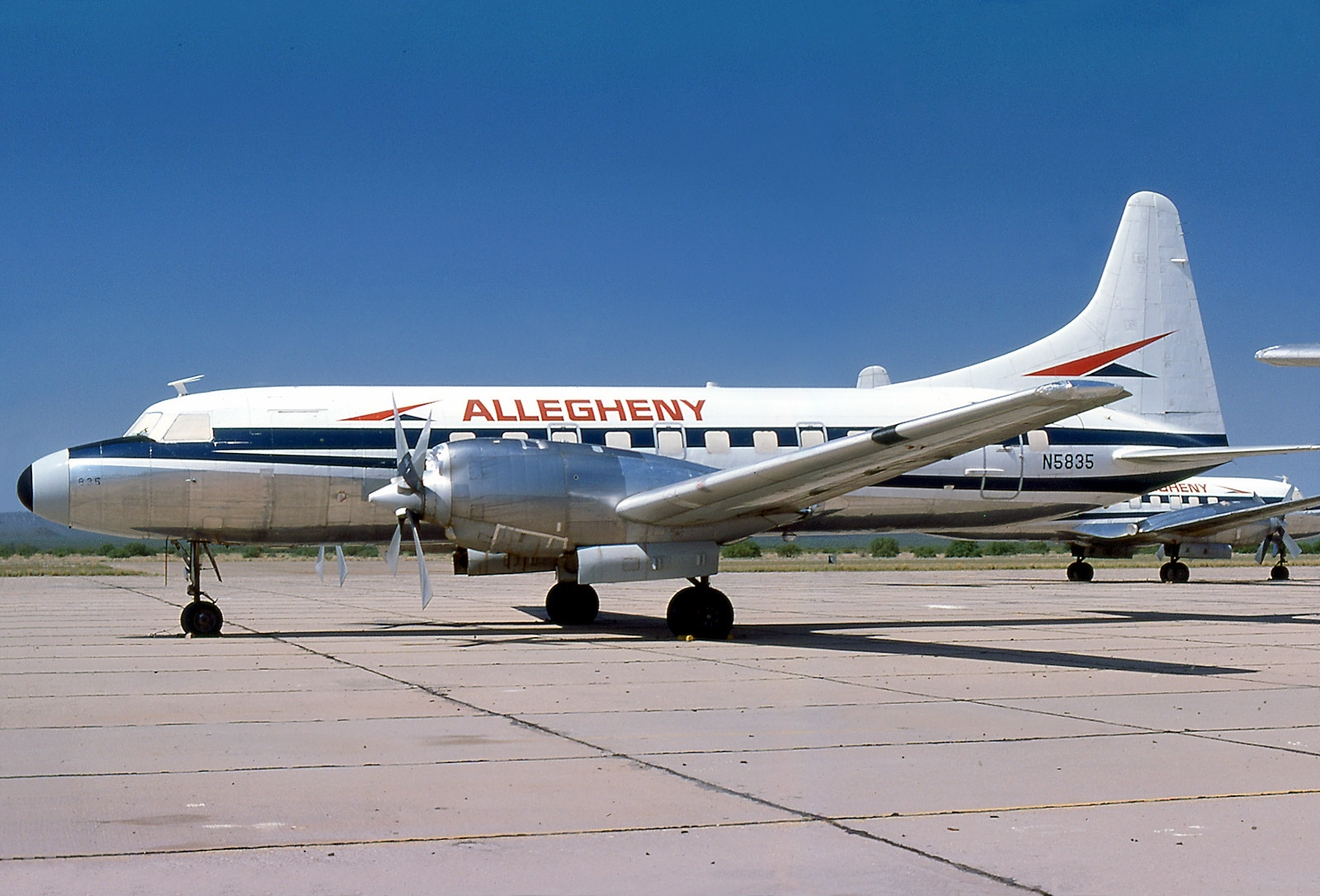
- A Convair 580 similar to the one involved

Occurrence
- Date: December 24, 1968
- Summary: Controlled flight into terrain
- Site: Near Bradford Regional Airport, Bradford, Pennsylvania; 41°45′56″N 78°36′6″W

Aircraft
- Aircraft type: Convair CV-580
- Operator: Allegheny Airlines
- Registration: N5802
- Flight origin: Detroit, Michigan
- 1st stopover: Erie International Airport
- Destination: Bradford Regional Airport
- Occupants: 47
- Passengers: 41
- Crew: 6
- Fatalities: 20
- Injuries: 27
- Survivors: 27

Allegheny Airlines Flight 736 was a regularly scheduled flight that crashed while attempting to land at Bradford Regional Airport in Bradford, Pennsylvania, on December 24, 1968. Of the 47 occupants on board, 20 were killed.

== Aircraft and crew ==
Flight 736 was operated using a Convair CV-580 (registration number N5802). The aircraft was originally certificated as a Convair CV-440 on March 4, 1957, but was modified to include upgraded turbine engines and propellers and re-certificated as a CV-580 on May 25, 1965. At the time of the accident, the aircraft had accumulated a total of 29,173 flight hours. The CV-580 was flown by Captain Gary Lee Mull, aged 33, and first officer Richard Bruce Gardner, aged 30.

== Flight ==
Flight 736 took off from Detroit, Michigan bound for Washington D.C., with intermediate stops in Erie, Bradford, and Harrisburg, Pennsylvania. The flight was uneventful until the aircraft began its approach to Bradford.

At 19:57 Eastern Standard Time, Flight 736 reported passing a DME east of Erie, and was instructed to descend to 4,000 feet and cleared for an approach to Bradford. At the same time, Flight 736 was advised that, at the last hourly observation, Bradford weather reported light snow showers, blowing snow, and one mile visibility. At 20:05, Bradford approach controllers advised Flight 736 again of light snow, blowing snow, and one mile visibility. Flight 736 acknowledged each weather advisory. At 20:08, Flight 736 reported that they were turning inbound for runway 32 and they were informed the wind was 290 degrees at 15 knots. This was Flight 736's last transmission before the crash.

Flight 736 continued to descend until the aircraft first struck trees approximately 2-1/8 nautical miles short of the runway, and under a mile northwest of the Kinzua Bridge. The airplane cut through the trees for a further 800 feet, extensively damaging the engines, until it impacted the ground. The fuselage came to rest inverted with the top portion (roof) of the fuselage torn away. Most of the survivors were seated toward the back of the aircraft and were wearing seatbelts, remaining in their seats until the plane came to a halt. Passengers who were able to free themselves then worked to free the remaining survivors. Due to a blinding snowstorm, rescue workers were initially prevented from reaching the crash site. Survivors started a bonfire outside of the aircraft using wood, seat cushions, and luggage to keep warm and attract rescuers to the crash site.

== Investigation ==
The National Transportation Safety Board investigated the accident. After reviewing the cockpit voice recorder and flight data recorder, the NTSB determined that the flight was flawless until the flight reached a DME 2.9 miles from the airport. The minimum altitude at the 2.9 mile DME was 2,900 feet above mean sea level; after reaching the DME, Flight 736 was authorized only to descend to the minimum descent altitude (MDA) of 2,543 feet. However, the aircraft continued to descend below the MDA until it contacted the trees at an altitude 462 feet below the MDA. The NTSB concluded that neither pilot was aware of the aircraft's proximity to the ground until initial contact with trees, at which point the first officer yelled, "Pull up." The pilots then attempted to pull up, but one second later the right wing struck a large tree, causing the aircraft to roll over.

The investigators focused on determining why the pilots allowed the aircraft to descend below the MDA. Crew fatigue, instrument or autopilot malfunction, and other mechanical issues were all considered and dismissed as unlikely causes. The NTSB concluded that the most likely explanation was that the descent was unintentional and resulted from both pilots looking away from the instruments, having instead focused on making visual contact with the runway. Based on cockpit conversations and weather data, the NTSB also concluded that while light snow and 1-mile visibility was reported to the pilots from the Bradford airport, weather conditions and visibility may have been substantially worse in the final approach area.

The NTSB determined the probable cause to be "the continuation of the descent from the final approach fix through the Minimum Descent Altitude and into obstructing terrain at a time when both flight crewmembers were looking outside the aircraft in an attempt to establish visual reference to the ground. Contributing factors were the minimal visual references available at night on the approaches to the Bradford Regional Airport; a small but critical navigational error during the later stages of the approach; and a rapid change in visibility conditions that was not known to the crew."

== Aftermath ==
Less than two weeks after Flight 736 crashed, Allegheny Airlines Flight 737 also went down on approach to Bradford Airport. Both aircraft were approaching the same runway but in opposite directions at the time of the crashes. Shortly after Flight 737's crash, Allegheny Airlines self-imposed new rules for landings at airports. The rules required visibility of 1,000 feet up and three miles out for any airport without instrument landing systems. Allegheny cancelled 124 out of 1,409 scheduled flight segments in the first week after the new visibility rules were adopted.

Almost 42 years after the crash, one of its survivors announced she was paying for a plaque for the flight's victims, survivors, and rescuers.
