= Chautauqua County/Jamestown Airport =

Airport in New York State, US

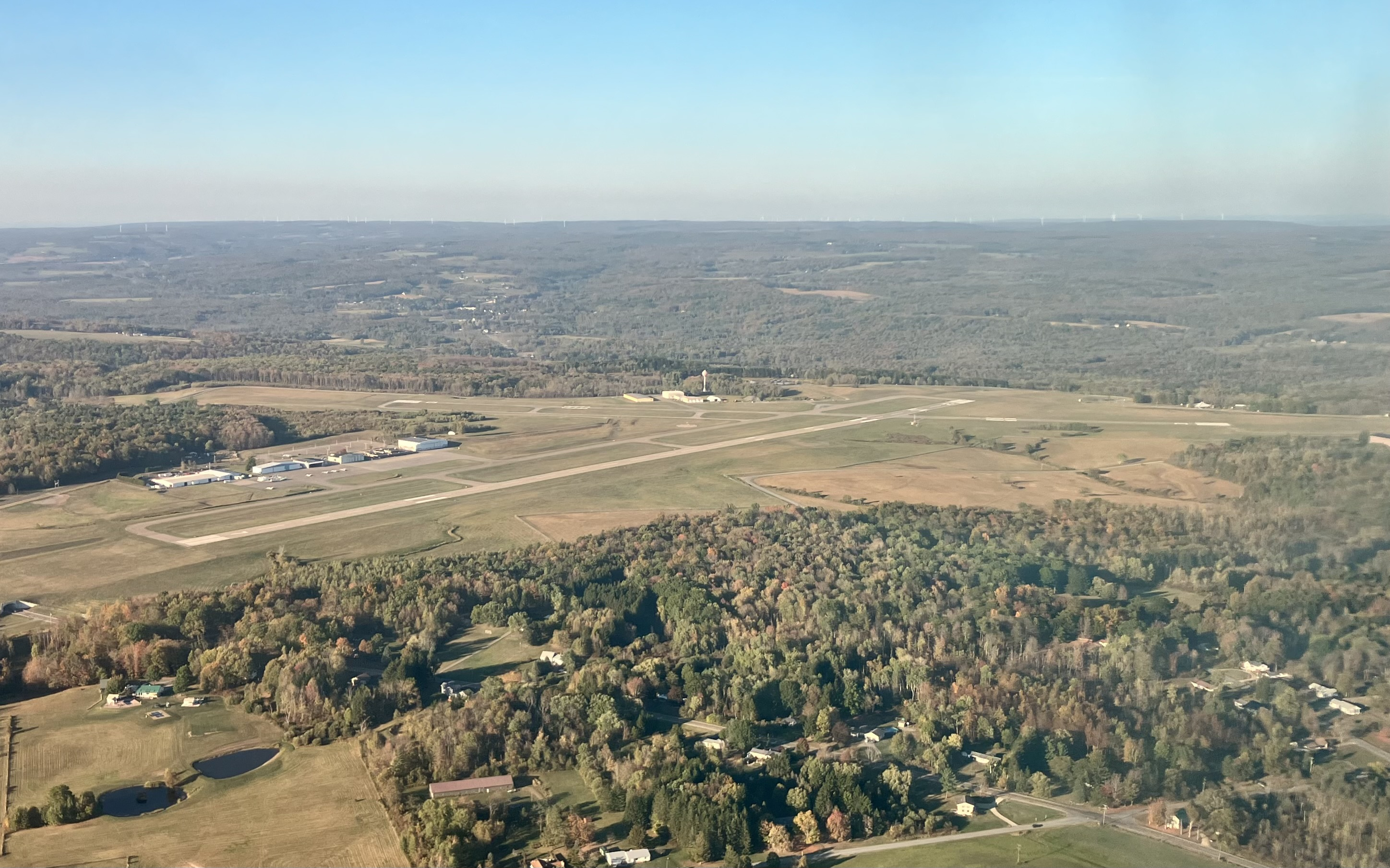
- IATA: JHW; ICAO: KJHW; FAA LID: JHW

Summary
- Airport type: Public
- Owner: Chautauqua County
- Serves: Jamestown, New York
- Location: Town of Ellicott, Chautauqua County, New York
- Elevation AMSL: 1,723 ft (525 m)
- Coordinates: 42°09′12″N 079°15′29″W
- Website: JHW Website

Maps
- FAA airport diagram
- Location of airport in New York JHW (the United States)

Runways
Direction	Length		Surface
Direction	ft	m	Surface
7/25	5,299	1,615	Asphalt
13/31	4,500	1,372	Asphalt

Statistics (2009)
- Aircraft operations: 16,394
- Based aircraft: 25
- Source: Federal Aviation Administration

Chautauqua County/Jamestown Airport at Robert H. Jackson Field (IATA: JHW, ICAO: KJHW, FAA LID: JHW) is a county-owned, public-use airport located three nautical miles (6 km) north of the central business district of Jamestown, in Chautauqua County, New York, United States. It is mostly used for general aviation.

As per the Federal Aviation Administration, this airport had 4,415 passenger boardings (enplanements) in calendar year 2008, 3,560 in 2009, and 3,679 in 2010. The National Plan of Integrated Airport Systems for 2011–2015 categorized it as a non-primary commercial service airport.

Until 2018, the airport was subsidized by the Essential Air Service to provide passenger air service. The EAS funding was terminated in January 2018, as not enough passengers were utilizing the airport.

== Facilities and aircraft ==
Chautauqua County/Jamestown Airport covers an area of 788 acres (319 ha) at an elevation of 1,723 feet (525 m) above mean sea level. It has two runways with asphalt surfaces: 7/25 is 5,299 by 100 feet (1,615 x 30 m) and 13/31 is 4,500 by 100 feet (1,372 x 30 m).

For the 12-month period ending December 31, 2009, the airport had 16,394 aircraft operations, an average of 44 per day: 84% general aviation, 16% scheduled commercial, and <1% military. At that time there were 25 aircraft based at this airport: 76% single-engine, 20% multi-engine, and 4% helicopter.

== Airlines and destinations ==
After the suspension of the EAS funding, Southern Airways Express, the lone operator at the airport, withdrew its service, leaving the airport without any permanent airline tenants. Boutique Air has requested to restore service to the airport but is insisting on EAS funding to do so. The Federal Aviation Administration rejected any restoration of EAS funding to the airport in February 2019, reiterating its previous stance in withdrawing the funds.

The airport, in conjunction with Southern Airways Express, again requested in 2025 to be allowed back into the program; the request was denied in 2026.

=== Statistics ===
Carrier shares: Mar 2017 – Feb 2018
Carrier	Passengers (arriving and departing)
Sun	2,160(100.00%)

Top domestic destinations: Mar 2017 – Feb 2018
Rank	City	Airport name & IATA code	Passengers
1	Pittsburgh, PA	Pittsburgh International (PIT)	1,100
2	Buffalo, NY	Buffalo Niagara International (BUF)	<10

== Ground transportation ==
The airport is served by New York State Route 60 and the Southern Tier Expressway.

Various taxis have access to and from the airport. The Hertz Corporation has a car rental counter.

== Shops and restaurants ==
The airport currently has no permanent shops. The Tarmac Cafe, which previously provided meal services, closed in 2016.

== Incidents and accidents ==
- On June 6, 2023, a Cirrus SR22 crashed shortly after taking off from Jamestown Airport. The two occupants of the aircraft were killed in the accident.
- On August 5, 2024, a Cessna Citation X carrying 2 pilots crashed while landing at the runway of the airport. The plane subsequently caught fire and was destroyed. The two pilots survived the accident but were injured. The flight had departed from Dunkirk Airport and was en route to Fort Lauderdale Executive Airport when the pilots began to smell smoke in the cabin, prompting the crew to attempt their diversion to the Jamestown Airport.

== See also ==
- List of airports in New York

== Other sources ==
- Essential Air Service documents (Docket OST-2003-14950) from the U.S. Department of Transportation:
  - Order 2006-3-17 (March 24, 2006): selecting RegionsAir to provide essential air service (EAS) with 30-passenger Saab 340 aircraft at Bradford, Pennsylvania, and Jamestown, New York, for two years. Service will be three round trips a day to Cleveland Hopkins International Airport, and the annual subsidy rate will be set at $1,649,913.
  - Order 2006-9-20 (September 21, 2006): tentatively vacating Order 2006-3-17 that selected Regions Air, Inc., to provide essential air service at Bradford, Pennsylvania, and Jamestown, New York, for two years. In addition, the Department is tentatively selecting Colgan Air, Inc., d/b/a US Airways Express to provide essential air service at both communities under its Pittsburgh option, i.e., three round trips each weekday and weekend to Pittsburgh at an annual subsidy rate of $2,434,827.
  - Order 2006-10-3 (October 4, 2006): finalizes Order 2006-9-20, which tentatively vacated our earlier selection of RegionsAir, Inc. to provide EAS at Bradford and Jamestown, and instead selects Colgan Air, Inc. d/b/a US Airways Express to provide EAS at both communities from October 1, 2006, through September 30, 2008, at an annual subsidy rate of $2,434,827. The subsidy rate is based on service to Pittsburgh, although Colgan has stated it is evaluating serving Washington Dulles International Airport instead of Pittsburgh, the service originally supported by both communities, at the same subsidy rate.
  - Order 2008-6-37 (June 30, 2008): selecting Gulfstream International Airlines, Inc. to provide subsidized essential air service (EAS) at Bradford, Pennsylvania, and Jamestown, New York, at a total annual subsidy of $2,701,865, for the two-year period from October 1, 2008, through September 30, 2010. However, if Gulfstream does not inaugurate full EAS by October 1, 2008, the selection defaults to Colgan Air, Inc. d/b/a United Express for the same two-period, for a total annual subsidy of $3,826,587.
  - Order 2010-9-12 (September 9, 2010): re-selecting Gulfstream International Airlines to provide essential air service (EAS) at Bradford, DuBois, and Oil City/Franklin, Pennsylvania, and Jamestown, New York, for a combined annual subsidy of $5,870,657 ($1,639,254 for Jamestown), from October 1, 2010, through September 30, 2012.
  - Order 2012-9-23 (September 27, 2012): selecting Silver Airways to provide Essential Air Service (EAS) at Bradford, DuBois, Franklin/Oil City, Pennsylvania, Jamestown, New York, and Parkersburg, West Virginia/Marietta, Ohio, for a combined annual subsidy of $10,348,117 ($1,940,272 for Bradford; $2,587,029 for DuBois, $1,293,515 for Franklin, $1,940,272 for Jamestown, and $2,587,029 for Parkersburg), from October 1, 2012, through September 30, 2014.
  - Notice of Intent (February 14, 2014): of Silver Airways Corp. to discontinue scheduled air service between Cleveland, Ohio (CLE) and: Jamestown, New York (JHW), Bradford, Pennsylvania (BFD), DuBois, Pennsylvania (DUJ), Franklin/Oil City, Pennsylvania (FKL), and Parkersburg, West Virginia/Marietta, Ohio (PKB).
