= Flight 371 =

Flight 371 may refer to:

- Allegheny Airlines Flight 371, crashed on 1 December 1959
- TAROM Flight 371, crashed on 31 March 1995
