= Aviation in Lycoming County, Pennsylvania =

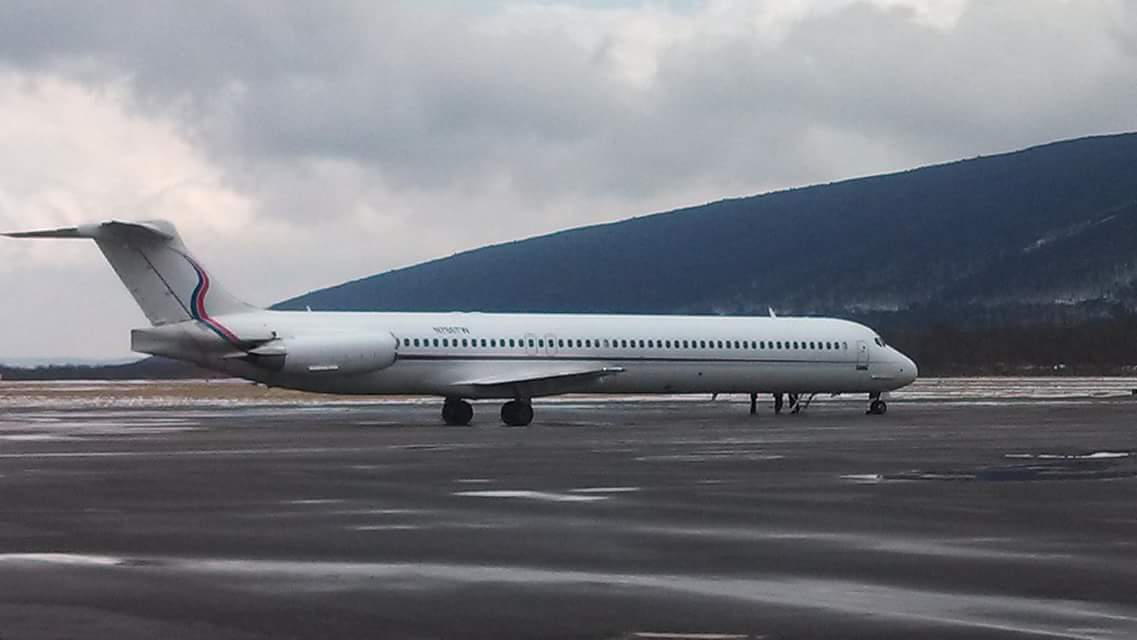
A Boeing 717 at Williamsport Regional Airport

Aviation in Lycoming County, Pennsylvania has dated back well over 100 years. The first flight occurred in 1910 in Campian Hills (modern Loyalsock Township).

== History ==
Aviation in Lycoming County dates back to approximately 1909. Where brothers Fred and Harry Burns worked to build the county's first working and functional aircraft. Seven years after the Wright Brothers of Kitty Hawk, North Carolina successfully took flight did the dream of aviation fully set in. With the inspiration of the Wright Brothers, Fred and Harry teamed up with neighborhood friend August Kuntz and on September 19, 1910 residents of Grampian Hills (now Loyalsock Township) heard what seemed to be a railroad locomotive, and looking to the sky saw "Great White wings" according to the Sunday Grit. The Burns brothers and Kuntz had built the first ever aircraft in Lycoming county. After several more flights and spectacles the aircraft was sold to the Federal Army of Mexico for scouting purposes.

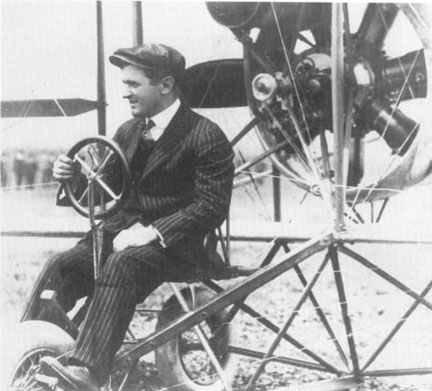
Lincoln J. Beachey with his flying machine

However the three aviators were not alone, famed aviator Lincoln J. Beachey came to Williamsport, Pennsylvania on his many travels across the United States. Local residents gathered to see Beachey's flying machine on July 8, 1911 where it took off from the Kenmore Land Co. field which is where East Third Street and Northway Road are today.

Despite the actions of the Burn brothers, August Kuntz and Beachey the region was not struck by the aviation boom until local pilots Captain Cleo Francis Pineau and A.W. Hinaman paved the way. Pineau served with the Royal Air Force during World War I. After which he returned to Williamsport where he helped form the airport. Hinaman was an instrumental in local aviation, eventually heading up Hinaman Aircraft Corp., which sponsored the first commercial flight to New York City. Hinaman also started the regions first flight school which trained pilots during World War II.

=== Formation of an airport ===
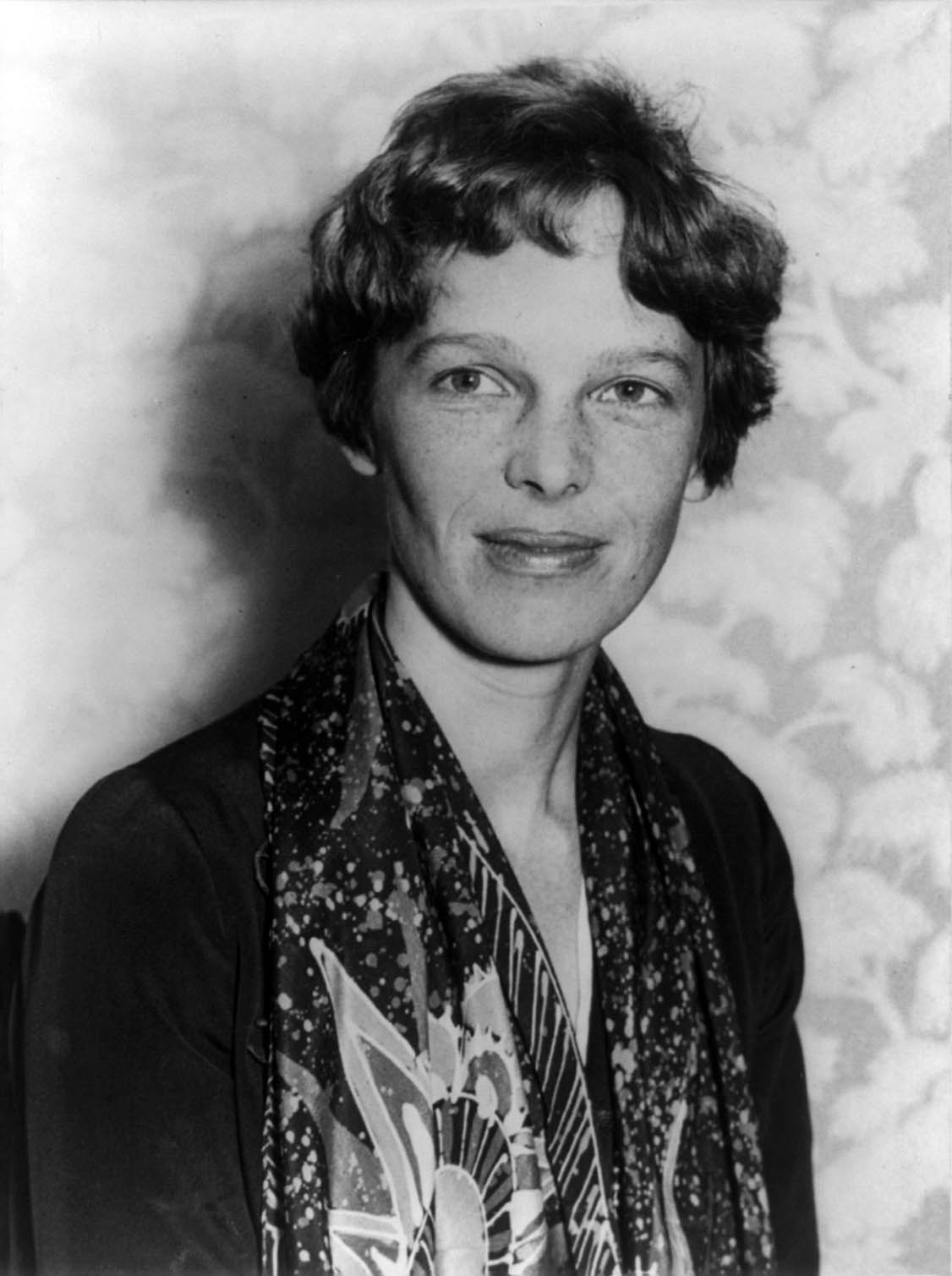
Earhard (pictured) arrived at the airport and called it one of the most advanced on the east coast

It wasn't until 1929 that Lycoming County had an official airport. About two years prior the city had bought 161 acres from local farmers for about $75,000. Where they constructed a hangar, and a x style cross runway for about $30,000. The airport was dedicated on July 20, 1929 and was heralded as one of the great leaders of the aviation movement on the east coast. An estimated crowd of 30,000 were in attendance which, until the 2011 Little League World Series, was the largest gathering in Lycoming county history.

The Airport held its first flight earlier that year and was operational ever since. The first ever commercial flight from New York City to Williamsport occurred in 1931.

Amelia Earhart at dedication of Williamsport Airport (1929)

"I'm sorry I'm late... but I flew here to Williamsport from New York to pay my respects to a city which I hear has one of the most modern airports in the East."

— Sunday Grit, W S-G P. A-5

On April 25, 1993, Thomas L. Knauff set an FAI world record flying a glider on an out-and-return course of 1,646.68 km (1,023.20 mi), releasing from tow over this airport, then flying along the Appalachian Mountains to Corryton, Tennessee, and returning for a landing 10 hours later. This world record stood for almost 20 years, and was only recently broken in Argentina, but is still a national record.

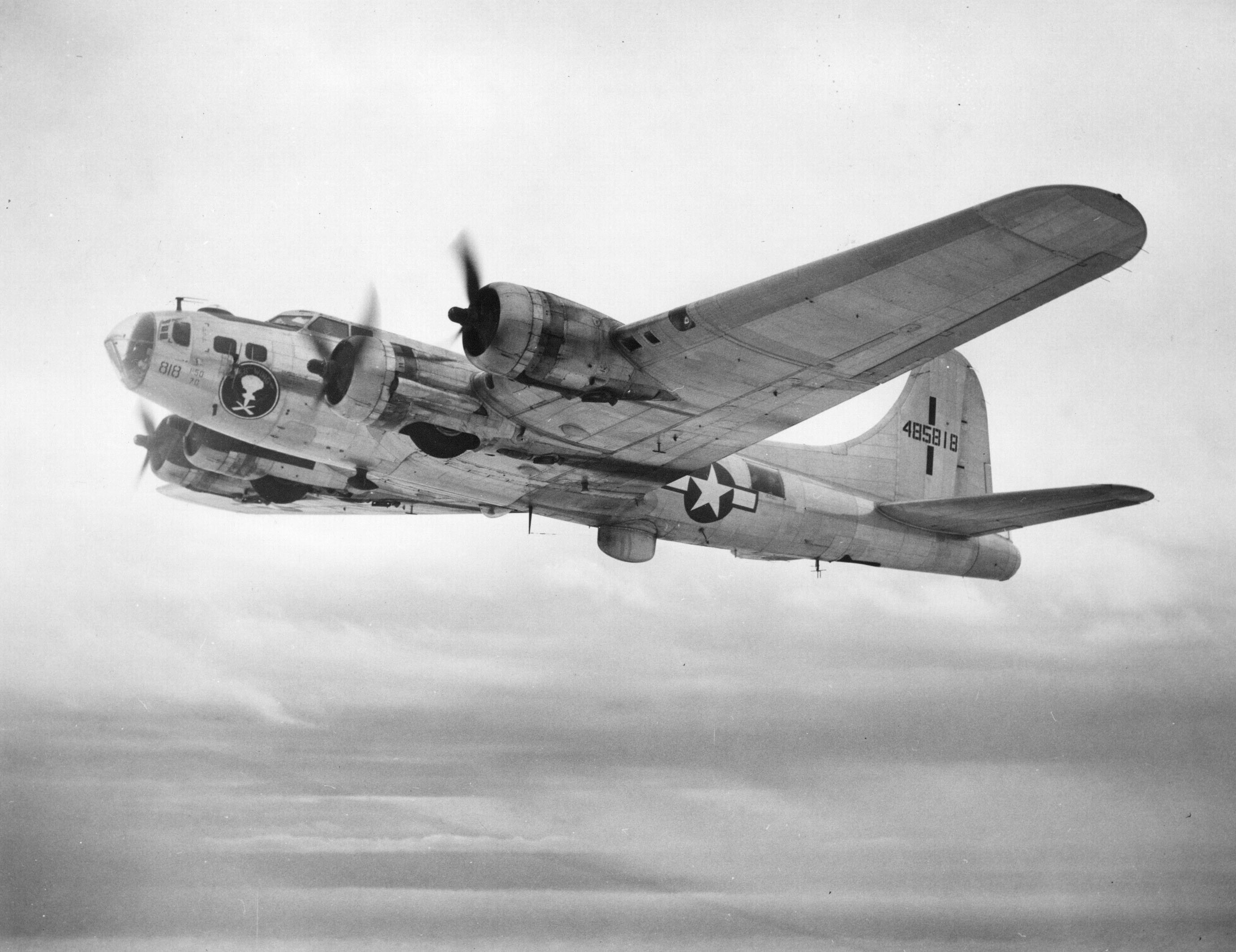
B-17 were encountered normally at airport which was a refueling stop during training exercises

The Williamsport Regional Association of Pilots holds a Fly-In every June. From 1996 to 2013 Williamsport Regional Airport held an Air Show and Ballonfest at the airport. Drawing large numbers from the area. Some of the most well known aircraft to arrive to the airport are the following: B-17, 193d Special Operations Wing's EJ-130J and the EC-130 Commando Solo

On May 14 the airport held an open house and airshow on the grounds. Some of the aircraft that were at the show were the "Spirit of Freedom" Douglas C-54 Skymaster used in the Berlin Blockade (or Berlin Airlift). Also an Ex-FedEx Express Boeing 727 now an aircraft classroom for Pennsylvania College of Technology, and a Boeing B-17 Flying Fortress, Douglas SBD Dauntless and many more.

=== Lycoming engines ===
Willamsport is home to Lycoming Engines, which, since 1929, has been one of the world's most prolific producers of aircraft engines. Switching from sewing machines and bicycles, to automobile engines for the carmakers of Errett Cord, Lycoming evolved into a leader in lightplane engines in the 1930s. Its early piston engines were radial engines which powered Stinson Aircraft, followed soon by small "flat-four" engines powering two-seaters like the Piper Cub.

Although its mid-20th Century attempts at building and selling giant piston engines failed, the company pioneered early turbine engines for medium- and heavy-lift helicopters, including the Bell UH-1 "Huey" and the Boeing CH-47 Chinook. Those turboshaft engines have led to pure-jet or turbofan engines powering BAe 146 small jetliners and Canadair Challenger business jets.

However, the company's highest-volume production, almost continuously since the 1940s, remains in flat-four piston engines powering tens of thousands of the world's most popular light aircraft, including the Cessna 172/Skyhawk and Piper Cherokee (and derivatives: Warrior, Archer, Arrow, Dakota), and most other Piper models. Lycomings have also powered various models, past or present, of Mooney, Beech, Bellanca, Aeronca/Champion/ACA, Grumman-American, Aero Commander, and Cirrus, along with many other manufacturers' aircraft, and large numbers of homebuilt aircraft and kitplanes.

=== Modern aviation ===
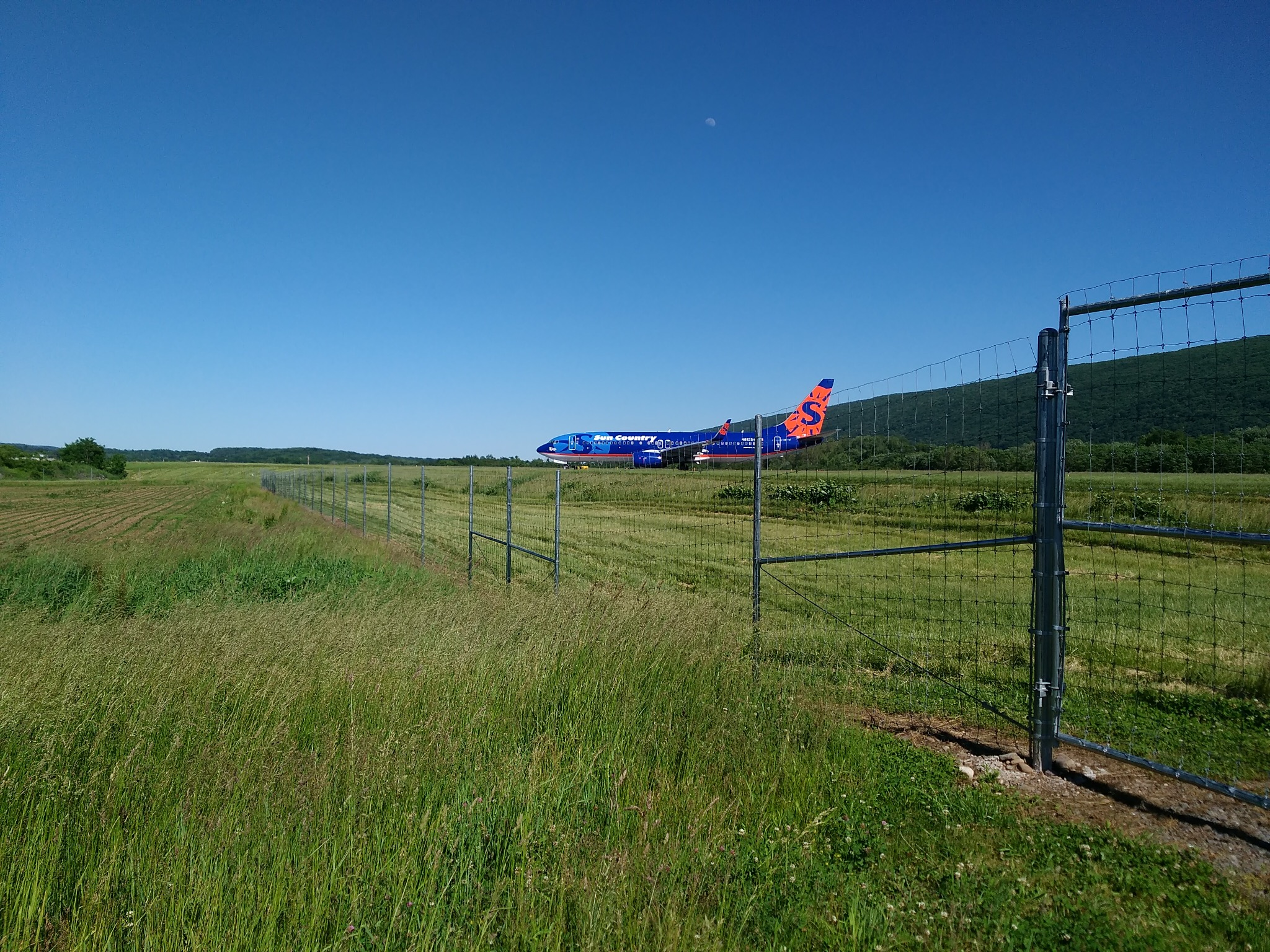
A Sun Country Airlines Boeing 737-800 at Williamsport Regional Airport

Aviation is still prominent in the Williamsport area. With one airline still flying into Williamsport (American Airlines) on a daily basis.

== Notable occurrences ==
- September 19, 1910 – First ever flight in Lycoming County
- July 8, 1911 – Stunt pilot Lincoln J. Beachey visits what is now Loyalsock Township
- 1927 – City of Williamsport and local Chamber of Commerce buy 161 acres of land for $75,000 from three farmers for future site of airport
- July 20, 1929 – Williamsport Regional Airport is dedicated with more than 30,000 people in attendance
- July 21, 1929 – Amelia Earhart visits airport
- 1931 – First commercial flight to/from New York City lands in Williamsport
- December 1, 1959 – Allegheny Airlines Flight 371 a Martin 2-0-2 crashed into a mountain on approach about 1.3 miles outside of South Williamsport, Pennsylvania killing all but one of the 26 passengers and crew on board making it the deadliest air disaster in the county's history.
- August 10, 1971 – Airport holds first air show
- June 11, 2012 – City council approves $13 million expansion project at airport

== Gallery ==
Images of aviation in Lycoming County:

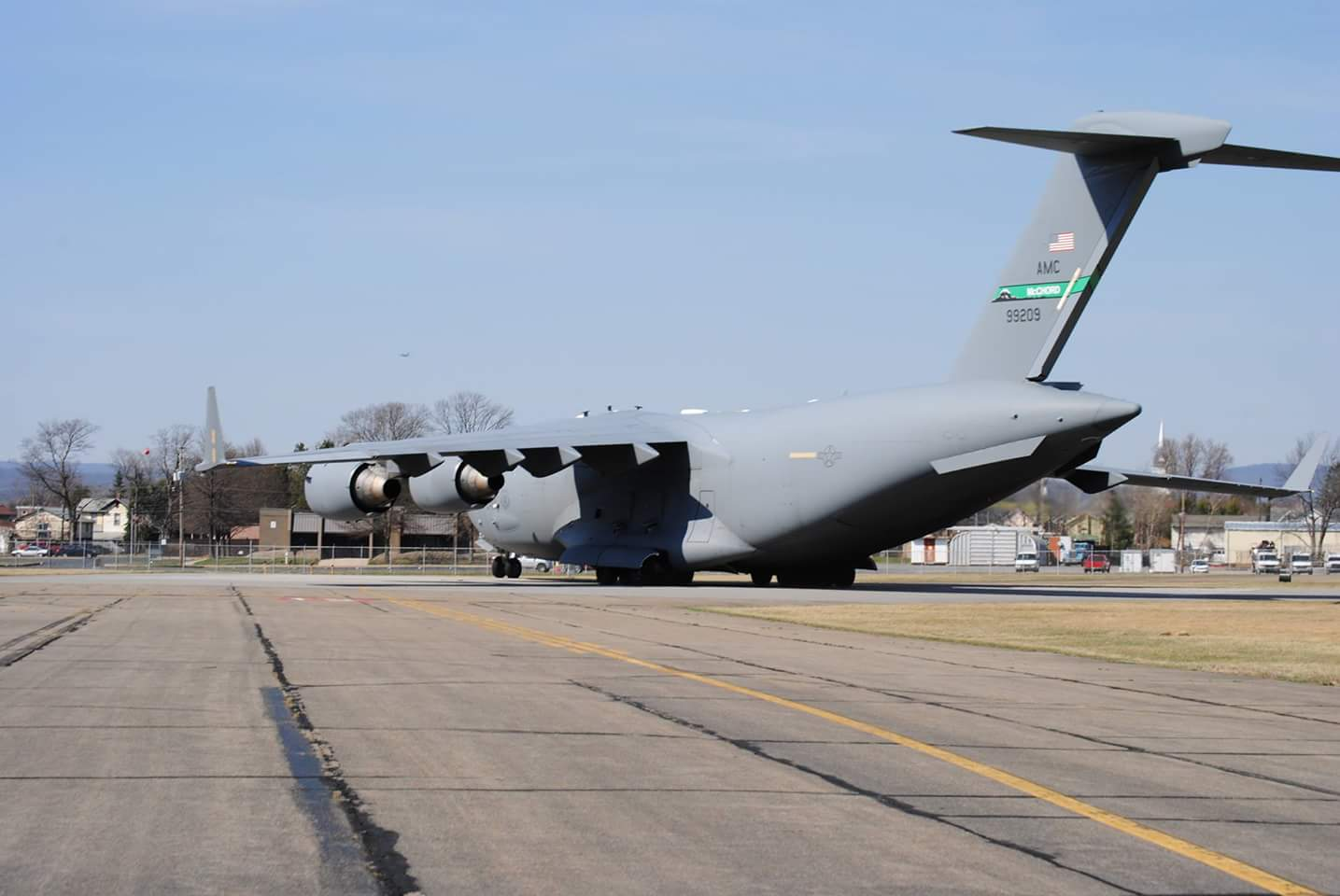
United States Air Force C-17 - IPT

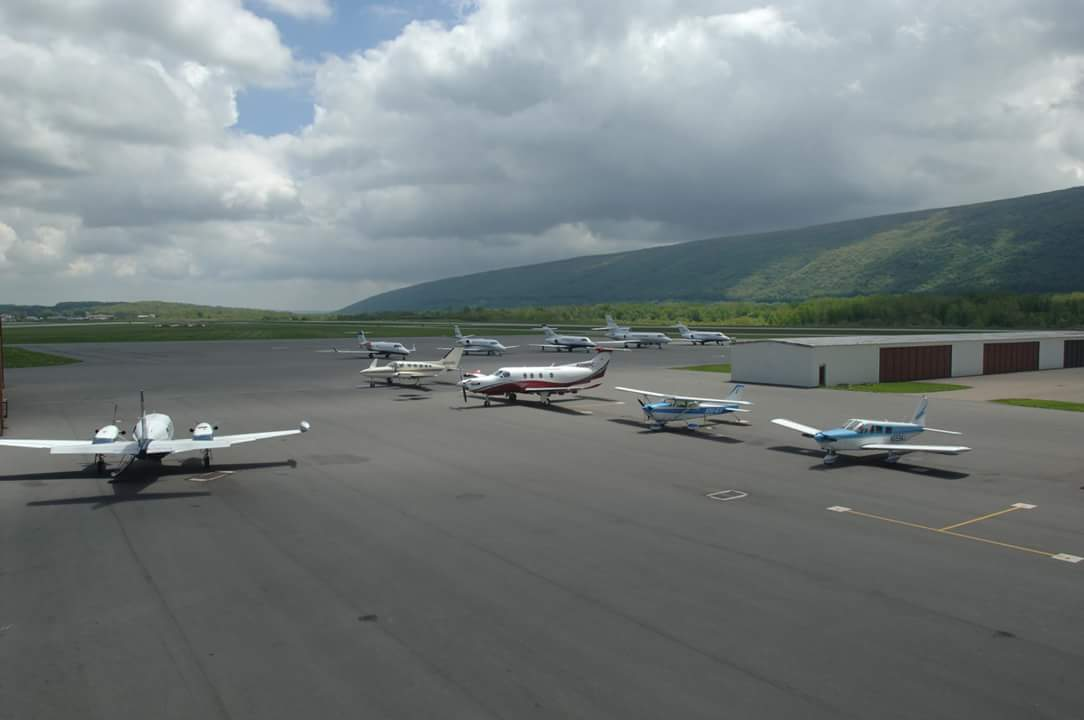
General Aviation - IPT

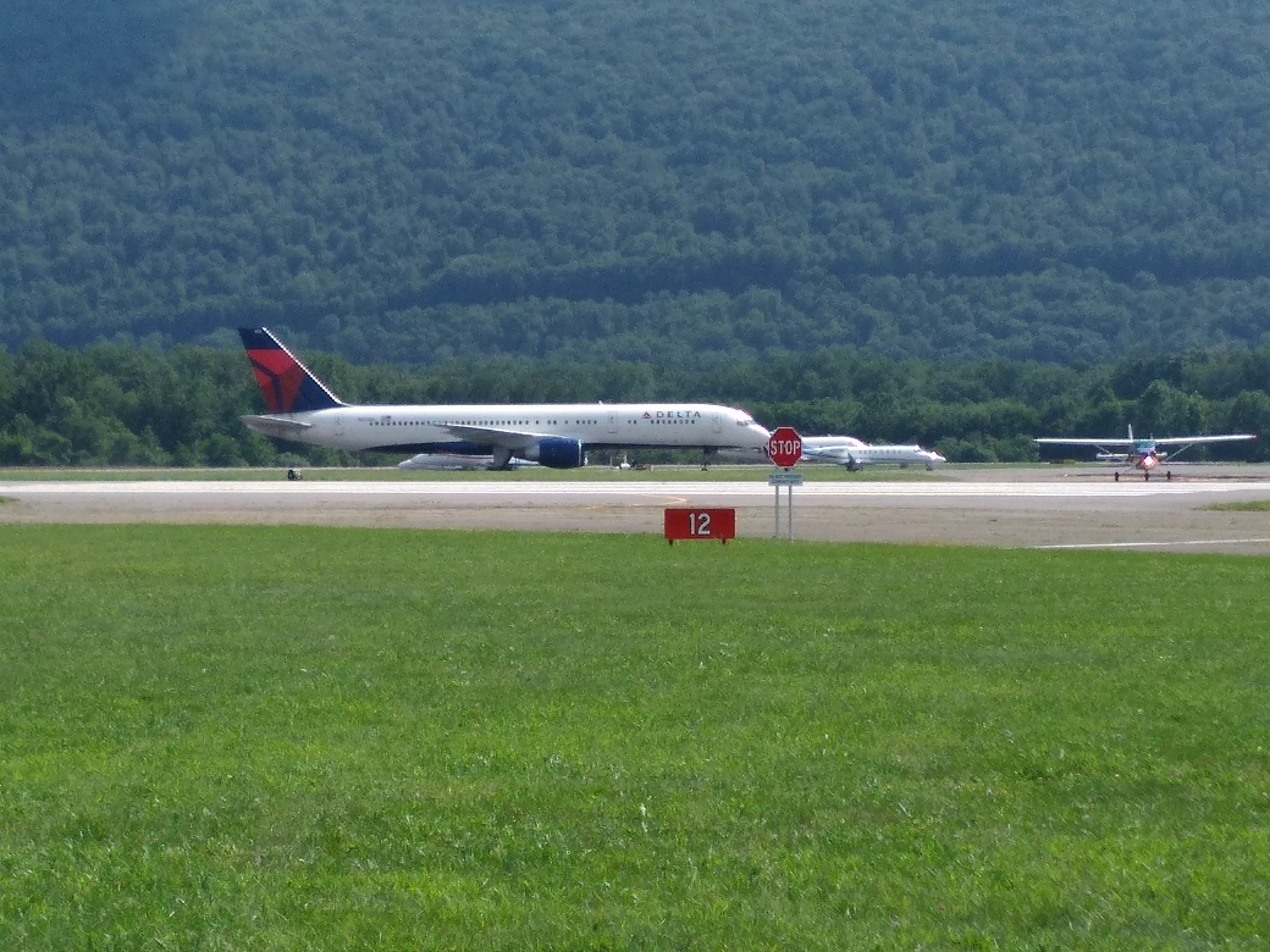
Delta Air Lines Boeing 757 - IPT

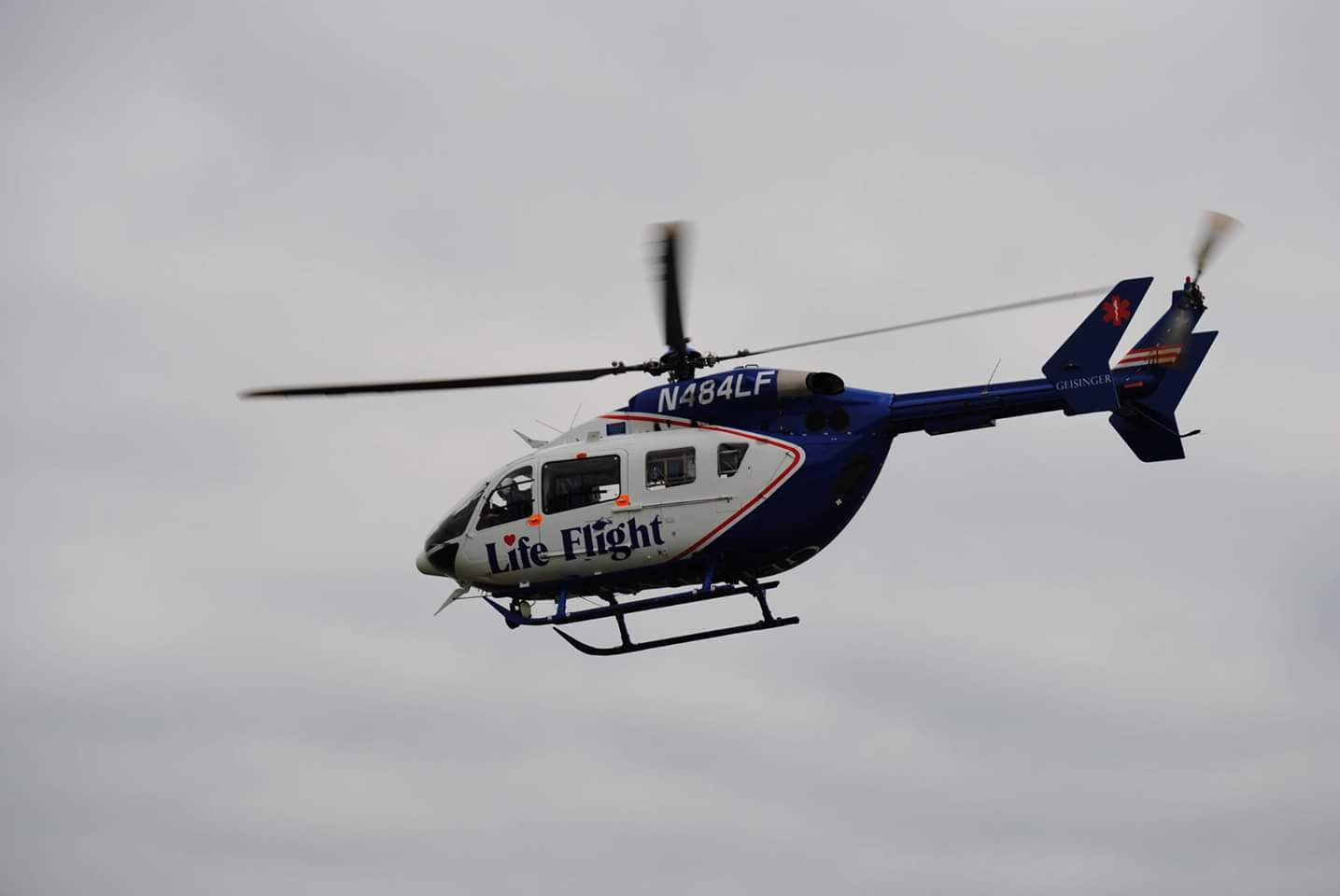
Life Flight air ambulance - IPT

== See also ==
- Aviation in Pennsylvania
