= Williamsport Regional Airport =

Commercial airport in Williamsport, Pennsylvania

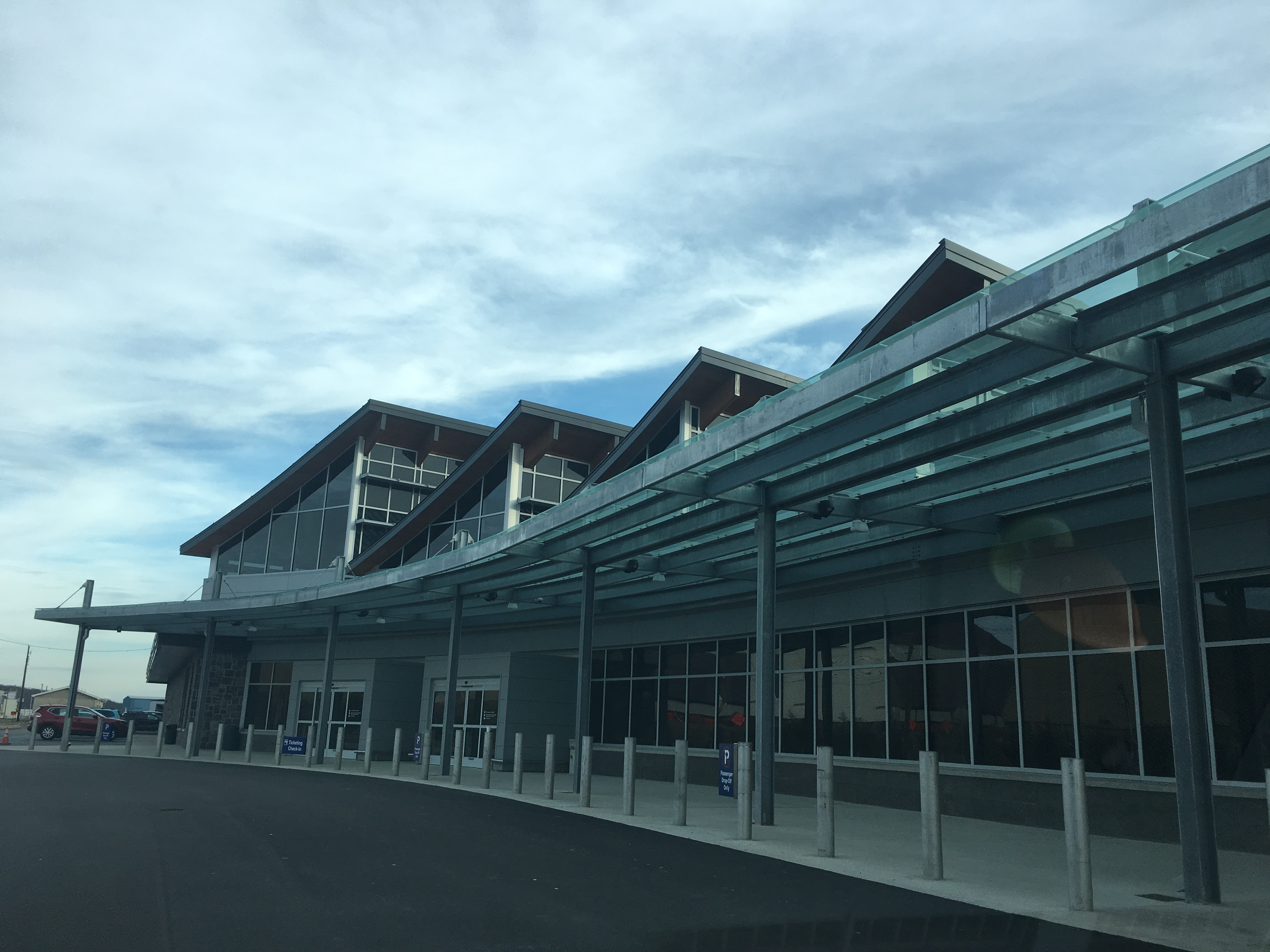
- Terminal in 2019
- IATA: IPT; ICAO: KIPT; FAA LID: IPT

Summary
- Airport type: Public
- Owner: Williamsport Municipal; Airport Authority
- Serves: Williamsport, Pennsylvania
- Elevation AMSL: 528 ft (161 m)
- Coordinates: 41°14′30″N 076°55′18″W
- Website: flyipt.com

Maps
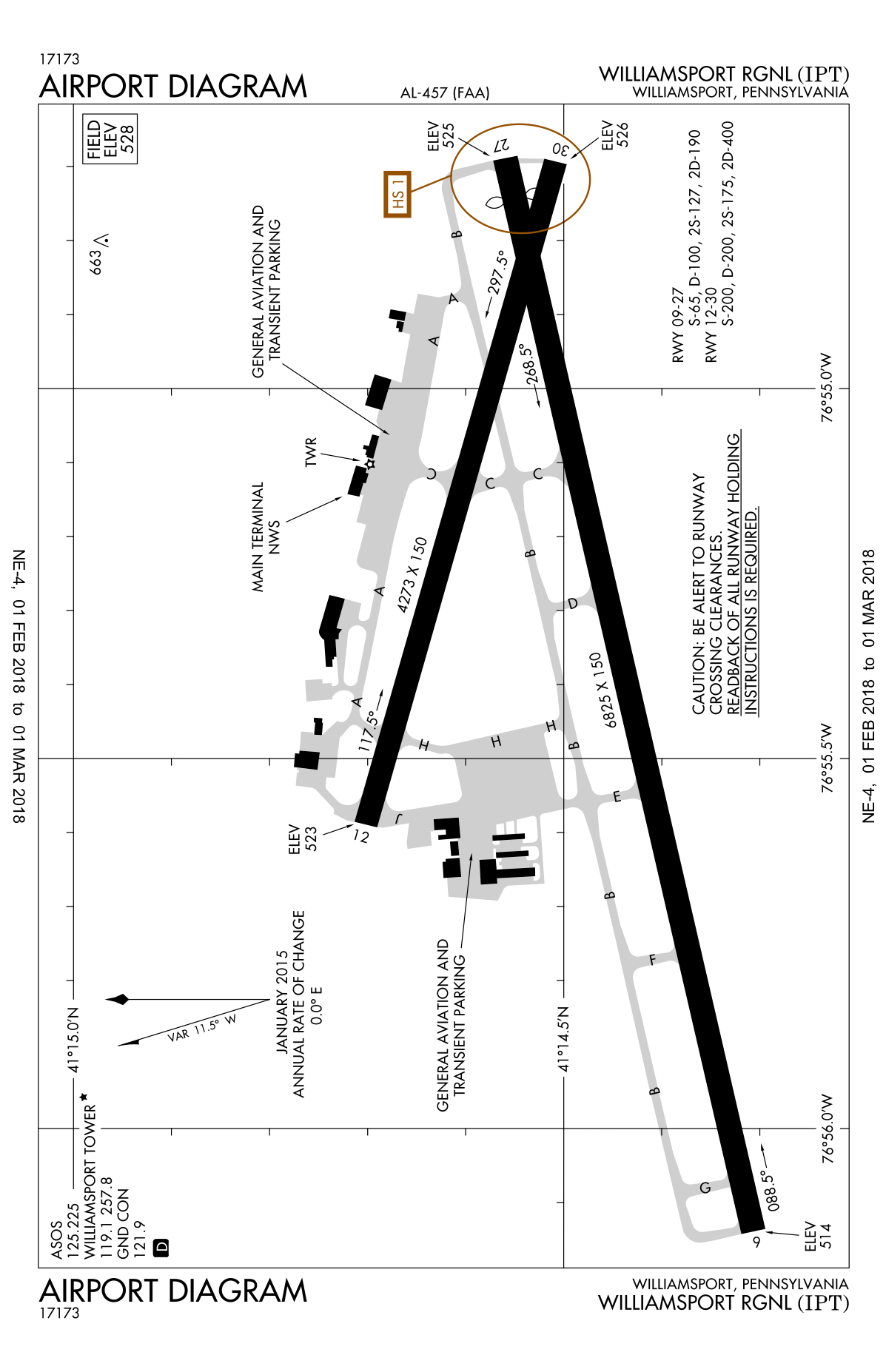
- FAA airport diagram
- Interactive map of Williamsport Regional Airport

Runways
Direction	Length		Surface
Direction	ft	m	Surface
09/27	6,825	2,080	Asphalt
12/30	4,273	1,302	Asphalt

Statistics (2016)
- Aircraft operations: 23,777 ▲
- Based aircraft: 51
- Passengers: 39,995 ▲
- Source: Federal Aviation Administration

Williamsport Regional Airport (IATA: IPT, ICAO: KIPT, FAA LID: IPT) serves Williamsport, Pennsylvania, and the surrounding area with a population of roughly 200,000. The airport processes approximately 40,000 passengers annually and has served north central Pennsylvania since 1929.

Located five miles east of Williamsport, in Lycoming County, Pennsylvania, this airport has two runways, 9/27 and 12/30, both asphalt. Southern Airways Express operated Cessna Caravans to Dulles International Airport until it terminated service in October 2026; Countour Airlines plans to start service to Charlotte in October. The airport is home to Energy Aviation LLC that provides general aviation services and is the operator of its terminal, commonly known in aviation parlance as a fixed-base operator (FBO).

Federal Aviation Administration reported 23,901 passenger boardings (enplanements) in calendar year 2008, 19,834 in 2009 and 22,519 in 2010. The National Plan of Integrated Airport Systems for 2011–2015 categorized it as a primary commercial service airport (more than 10,000 enplanements per year).

In 2016 county, state and federal officials okayed a plan for over $75 million of improvements to the airport including airfield and building improvements. In late 2017 the airport began work on a brand new terminal building with seating for 150, limited food options, updated security features and a passenger loading bridge.

== History ==
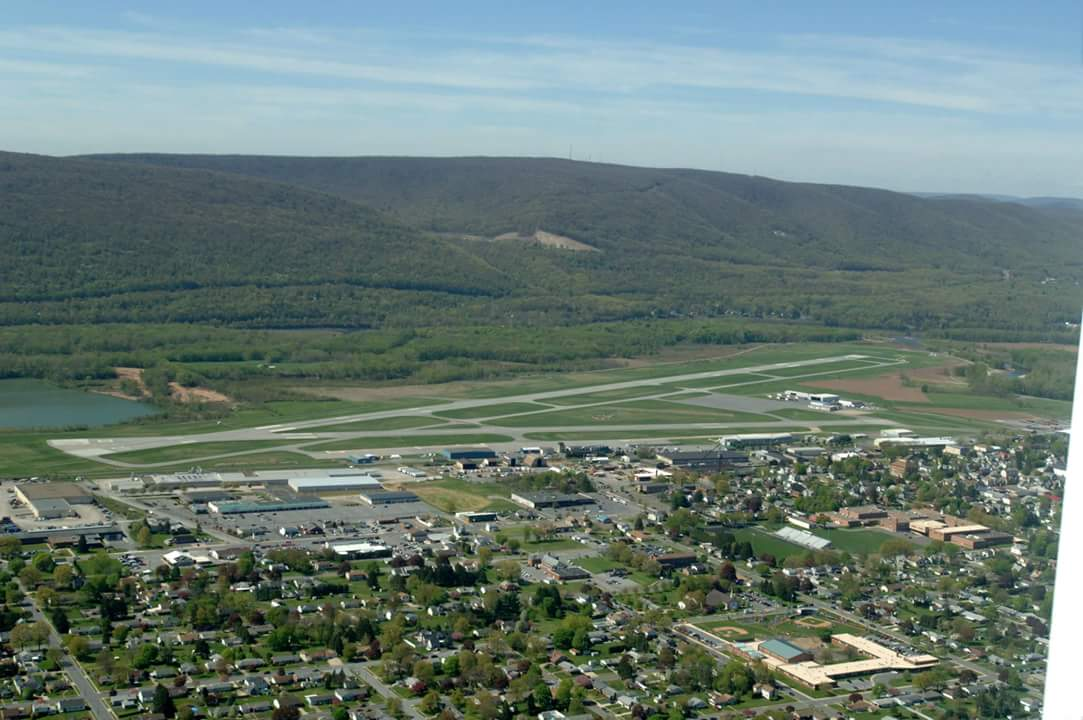
Aerial view

In 1928 the Williamsport Civil Aviation Authority was looking for a location to build an airport near Williamsport. The airport company, with help from the Chamber of Commerce and the City of Williamsport, sold hundreds of shares of stock at $100 each until it had raised about $75,000, enough to buy 161 acres of a family farm in Montoursville. Then in late 1928, with approval from state and federal government officials, the airport company was granted a charter.

On April 25, 1993 Thomas L. Knauff set an FAI world record flying a glider on an out-and-return course of 1,646.68 km (1,023.20 mi), releasing from tow over this airport, then flying along the Appalachian Mountains to Corryton, Tennessee, and returning for a landing 10 hours later. This world record stood for almost 20 years, and was only recently broken in Argentina, but is still a national record.

=== Historical airline service ===
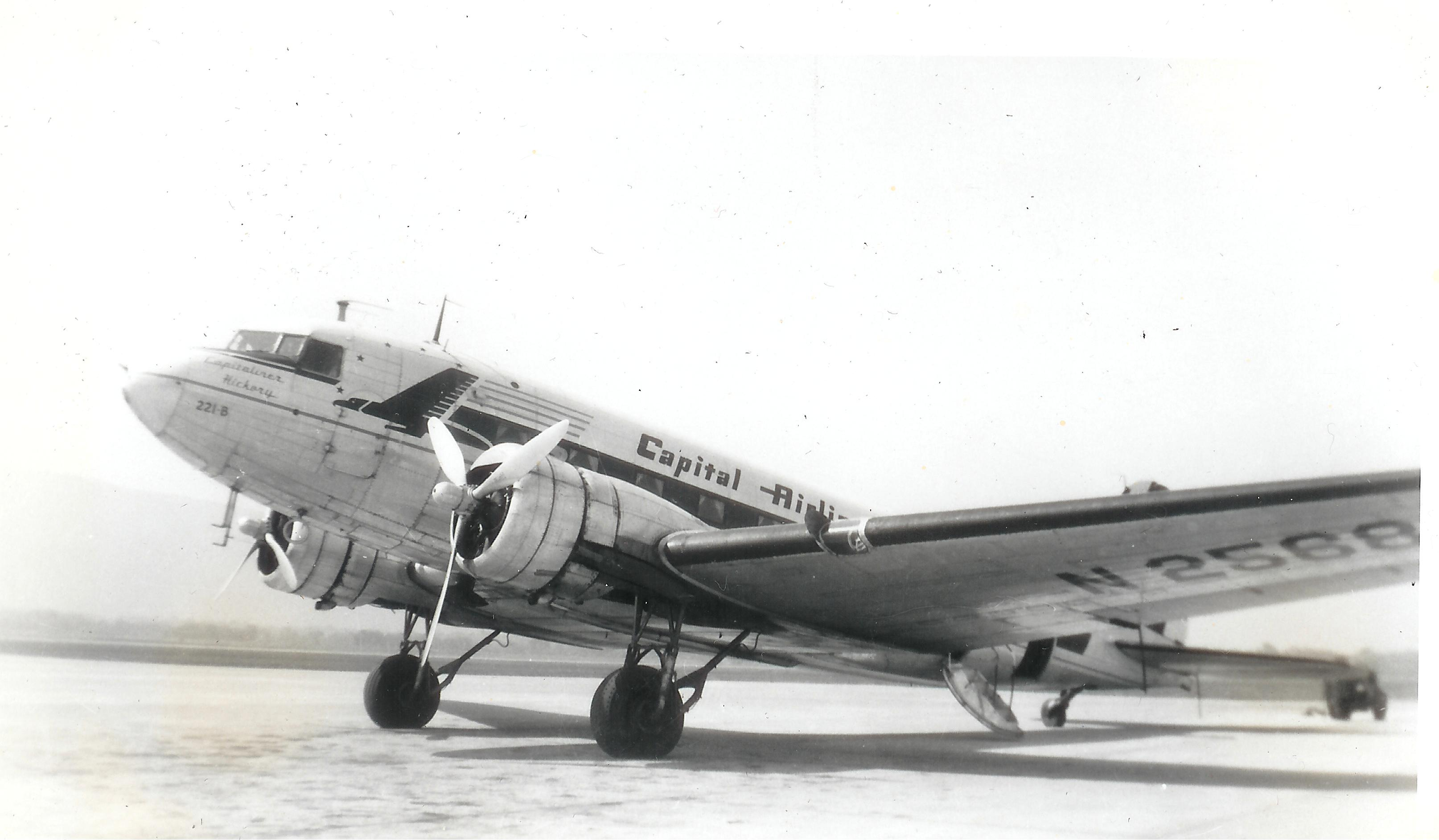
Capital Airlines DC-3 in 1952

In 1946 Trans World Airlines (TWA) and Pennsylvania Central Airlines, the predecessor of Capital Airlines, served Williamsport; All American Aviation, the predecessor of Allegheny Airlines, joined them in 1949. In 1950 Capital Airlines was flying Douglas DC-3s to Baltimore, Buffalo, NY, Philadelphia, Rochester, NY and Washington D.C. National Airport. In 1961 Capital was merged into United Airlines which continued at Williamsport. In 1964 TWA Lockheed Constellations flew Boston - Albany, NY - Binghamton - Wilkes-Barre/Scranton - Williamsport - Pittsburgh - Columbus, OH - Indianapolis - St. Louis - Kansas City. TWA left IPT in 1965. In early 1966 United Airlines Vickers Viscounts flew nonstop to Philadelphia, Harrisburg and Elmira and direct to New York Newark Airport, Washington National Airport and Buffalo. United left the airport later in 1966; Allegheny continued nonstop flights to Erie, New York LaGuardia Airport, Philadelphia, Pittsburgh, Philipsburg, PA and Wilkes-Barre/Scranton and direct to Boston, Cleveland, Detroit, Dubois, PA, Hartford, CT, New York Newark Airport and Providence, RI operated with Convair 440s and Convair 580s. In the mid 1970s Allegheny BAC One-Elevens and McDonnell Douglas DC-9-30s flew nonstop to Binghamton, Ithaca and Pittsburgh and direct to Chicago O'Hare Airport, Cleveland, Dayton and Utica, NY Allegheny Commuter took over in 1979 with Beechcraft and Nord 262 flying nonstop from Pittsburgh, Philadelphia, New York Newark Airport, Harrisburg and Wilkes-Barre/Scranton, and was the only airline at the airport in fall 1979. Allegheny Commuter service continued for Allegheny successor USAir. In early 1985 Allegheny Commuter had three weekday nonstops from Philadelphia and four weekday nonstops from Pittsburgh with Short 330s and Short 360s. In fall 1994 USAir Express, successor to Allegheny Commuter, flew Beechcraft 1900C and Short 360s to Philadelphia and BAe Jetstream 31s and Embraer EMB-120 Brasilias to Pittsburgh. USAir changed its name to US Airways and in 2004 its affiliate US Airways Express ended flights to Pittsburgh International Airport. US Airways merged with American Airlines in 2015; in June 2016 American Eagle typically had three regional jet flights a day for American Airlines to its hub in Philadelphia. On August 18, 2020 American Eagle service was switched from Philadelphia to two daily flights to Charlotte, NC however all service ended on October 7, 2020. American Eagle resumed service on January 5, 2021 with one daily flight to Philadelphia however this flight ended on September 30, 2021.

=== Current air service ===
On January 8, 2024, the airport announced that Southern Airways Express would begin service to Dulles International Airport (outside Washington, DC) on May 23, 2024, with a planned 10 flights per week, marking the return of commercial passenger service for the first time since September 2021. Interline agreements with United, American, and Alaska Airlines will permit "seamless connections" including through-bag transfer.

=== Annual fly-in and air show ===
The Williamsport Regional Association of Pilots holds a fly-in every June. From 1996 to 2013 Williamsport Regional Airport held an Air Show and Balloonfest at the airport, attracting many visitors. Some of the most well-known aircraft to arrive at the airport are the B-17, 193d Special Operations Wing's EC-130J and the EC-130 Commando Solo.

On May 14, 2016 the airport held an open house and airshow. One of the aircraft at the show was the Spirit of Freedom Douglas C-54 Skymaster used in the Berlin Blockade (or Berlin Airlift). It also featured an ex-FedEx Express Boeing 727 (now an aircraft classroom for Pennsylvania College of Technology), a Boeing B-17 Flying Fortress, and Douglas SBD Dauntless.

=== Expansion ===
In 2009 the airport authority and city leaders announced a $3 million budget to do minor renovation to the existing terminal, update tax-exempt and runway lighting and widen taxiways. The project was completed in fall 2011.

In 2016 the Williamsport Municipal Airport Authority began the bidding process for a new $15.9 million terminal which they planned to open by the end of 2017. A grant of $798,000 was given to the airport which installed a new glide slope system, access road and repainted airfield taxiway and runway lines.

After a delay in the approval process, in April 2017, contracts were awarded to local construction companies. The new terminal was built alongside the existing terminal and has a jet bridge. The old terminal was torn down for more parking. The new terminal opened on October 15, 2018.

In January 2019, Pennsylvania state and federal grants were approved to be adopted by the airport authority in a public meeting in January. The funds of over $600,000 were allocated for MALSR lighting system on the approach end of runway 27 and runway 9. Taxiway echo was relocated and made into a high-speed taxiway. More than $150,000 was set aside for finalizing the airport's fuel farm.

== Facilities ==
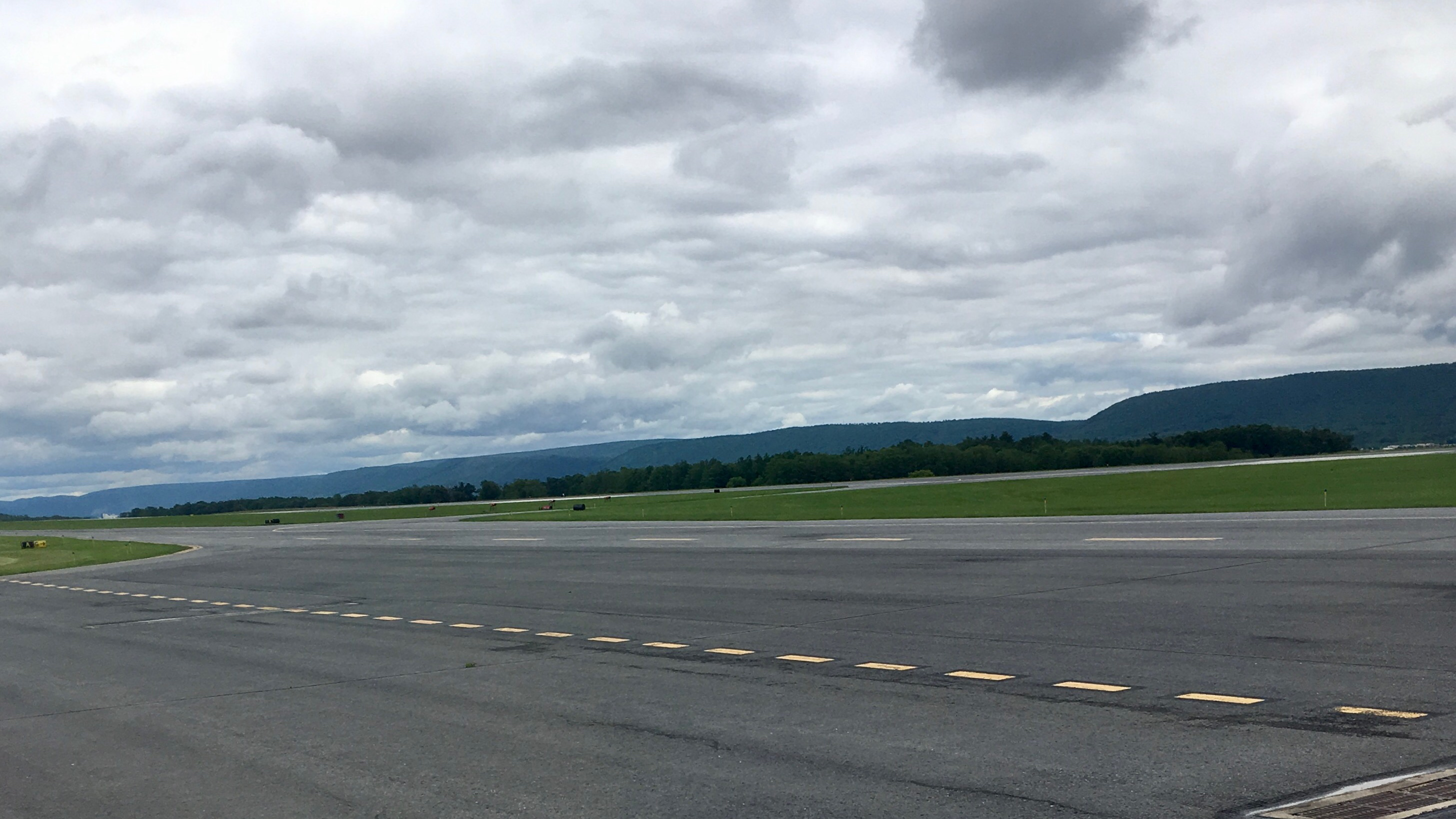
Airport apron

The airport covers 535 acres (217 ha) at an elevation of 528 feet (161 m). It has two asphalt runways: 9/27 is 6,825 by 150 feet (2,080 by 46 m), and runway 12/30 is 4,273 by 150 feet (1,302 by 46 m).

In 2016 the airport had 33,019 aircraft movements, average 90 per day: 70% general aviation, 19% air taxi, 9% airline and 2% military. Of the 51 based aircraft, 32 are single engine, 10 are multi-engine, 7 jet and 2 helicopter.

The airport has one terminal that opened in 2018. Energy Aviation is the fixed-base operator; there are hangars and the headquarters of Life Flight air ambulance service. The airport is home to Pennsylvania College of Technology Air Mechanics and Aerospace building.

=== Runways ===
Runway	Length	Notes
9/27	6,825 feet (2,080 m)	Used by nearly all commercial flights, with ILS on 27 side.
12/30	4,273 feet (1,302 m)	
33/15	2,300 feet (700 m)	Closed in 1979 and removed in 1981.

=== Aircraft ===
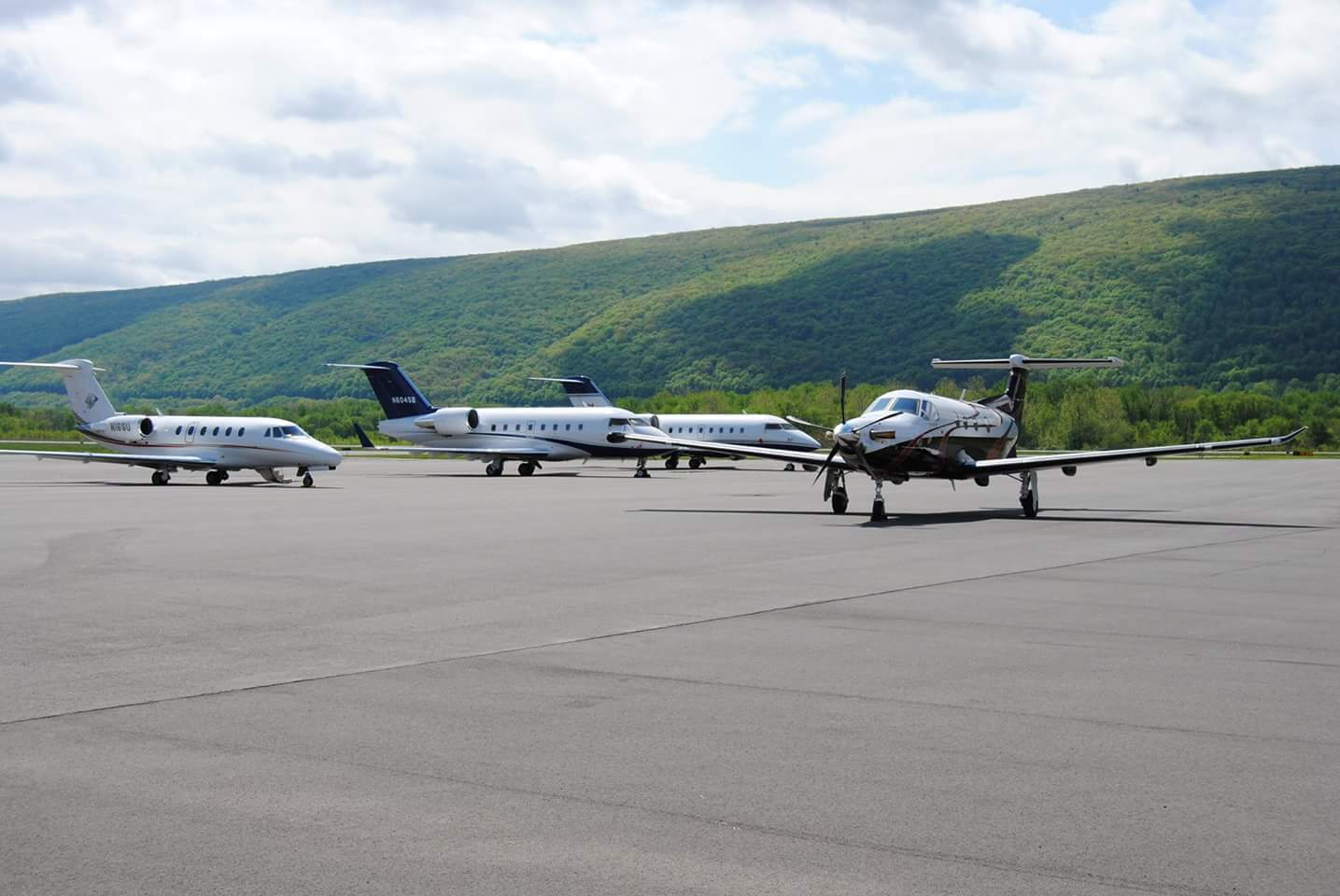
General aviation aircraft at Energy Aviation (a FBO) at IPT

- Cessna Grand Caravan Passenger Planes by Southern Airways Express.
- FedEx Feeder uses Cessna 208 Caravan cargo aircraft year round.
- Over the past 15 years, the airport general aviation multi-engine and jet population have steadily grown. It is common to see multiple Hawker 400s, Learjets and numerous types of GA jets and props at IPT.
- Pennsylvania State Police Aviation operated helicopters and fixed wing aircraft from IPT such as Bell 407 helicopters and C208B fixed-wing airplanes. They have since moved to Hazelton.
- Life Flight Air Ambulance Pennsylvania operates a Eurocopter-Kawasaki EC-145 (BK-117C-2) for rescue and air ambulance transports throughout the area.

== Airlines and destinations ==
=== Passenger ===
Airlines	Destinations
Contour Airlines	Charlotte

== Statistics ==
=== Top destinations ===
Busiest domestic routes from IPT (May 2025 – April 2026)
Rank	City	Passengers	Carriers
1	Washington–Dulles, Virginia	2,050	Southern Airways Express

=== Passenger ===
Year	Passengers
2009	29,753
2010	33,457▲
2011	31,401▼
2012	37,949▲
2013	35,194▼
2014	35,645▲
2015	37,886▲
2016	39,119▲
2017	36,646▼
2018	45,094▲

== Military use ==
IPT is not designated as a military airport, as it does not have any military aircraft or Pennsylvania Air National Guard based on premises. However the PA Air National Guard and Air Force use the airport for some training exercises over the course of the year. Mostly from Harrisburg, Fort Indiantown Gap, or the air reserve station in Pittsburgh, they mostly perform TGL maneuvers and re-fueling stops due to its low commercial traffic and up to date facilities.

At times United States Air Force's Lockheed C-130 Hercules, C-17 Globemaster and Lockheed EC-130 have performed TGLs at IPT from multiple air bases on the East Coast.

== Incidents and accidents ==
- On December 1, 1959, Allegheny Airlines Flight 371, a Martin 2-0-2, crashed into a mountain about 1.3 miles (2.1 km) outside of South Williamsport killing all but one of the 26 passengers and crew. The accident was caused by low cloud ceiling and foggy conditions causing the pilots to not know where they were. There were two contributing factors: the FAA found that the airline or pilots never should have taken off, but did because they had been delayed and wanted to make up lost time. The second factor was determined to be pilot error because the pilots did not realize their altitude.
- On April 4, 1991, the Merion air disaster occurred when a Sunbell Aviation Helicopters Bell 412 collided mid-air with a Piper Aerostar which was flying from Williamsport to Northeast Philadelphia Airport. The Piper was carrying United States senator from Pennsylvania H. John Heinz III when it collided over Merion Elementary School in Lower Merion Township. All aboard both aircraft, as well as two children at the school, were killed. The helicopter had been dispatched to investigate a problem with the landing gear of Heinz's plane. While moving in for a closer look, the helicopter collided with the plane, causing both aircraft to lose control and crash. The subsequent NTSB investigation attributed the cause of the crash to poor judgment by the pilots of the two aircraft involved.
- On December 22, 2015, at 8:45 a.m., a Porter Airlines flight with 66 on board was diverted to Williamsport Regional Airport due to reports of thick smoke in the cockpit and cabin. The flight from Billy Bishop Toronto City Airport to Dulles International Airport had to make an emergency landing in Williamsport. Two crew members were taken to Williamsport Regional Medical Center to be checked out due to smoke inhalation. The sixty-six passengers were taken to the terminal to be cleared by customs and then were able to leave airport grounds. The next day Porter Airlines brought a new Dash 8 400 to continue the passengers to Washington, D.C.

== See also ==
- William T. Piper Memorial Airport
- List of airports in Pennsylvania
- Allegheny Airlines Flight 371
