= Allegheny Airlines Flight 371 =

1959 aviation accident

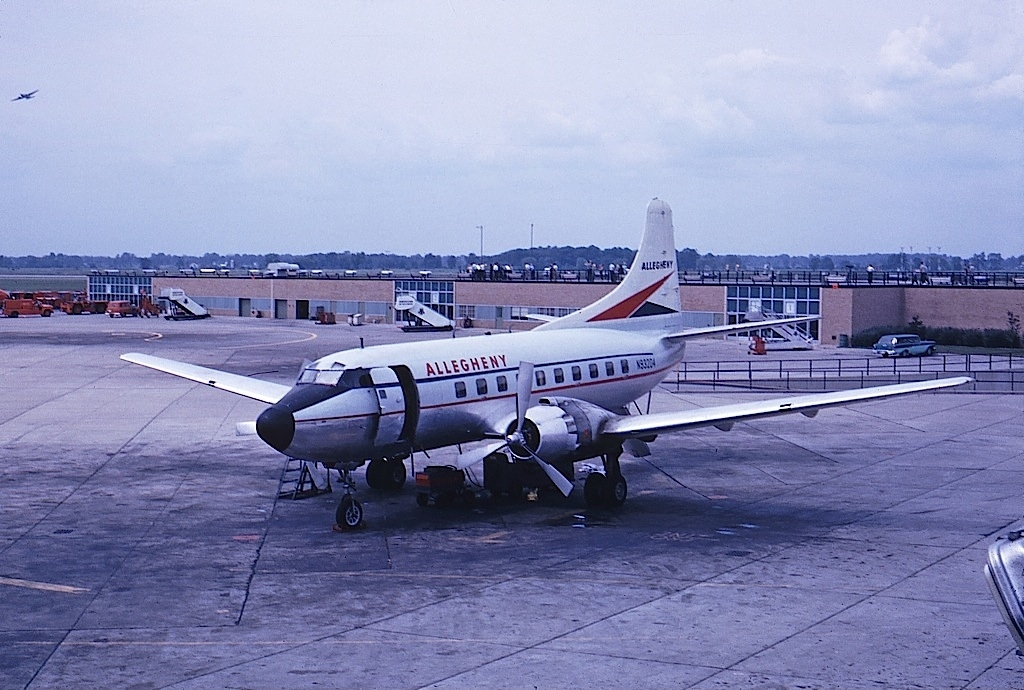
- An Allegheny Airlines Martin 2-0-2, similar to the aircraft involved

Occurrence
- Date: December 1, 1959
- Summary: Erroneous instrument indication
- Site: Bald Eagle Mountain South Williamsport, Pennsylvania; 41°13′32.09″N 76°54′38.45″W

Aircraft
- Aircraft type: Martin 2-0-2
- Operator: Allegheny Airlines
- Registration: N174A
- Flight origin: Philadelphia International Airport
- Stopover: Harrisburg-York State Airport
- 2nd stopover: Williamsport Regional Airport
- 3rd stopover: Bradford Regional Airport
- 4th stopover: Port Erie Airport
- Destination: Cleveland Hopkins International Airport
- Passengers: 22
- Crew: 4
- Fatalities: 25
- Injuries: 1
- Survivors: 1

Allegheny Airlines Flight 371 was a scheduled passenger flight on December 1, 1959, between Philadelphia, Pennsylvania and Cleveland, Ohio with stops in Pennsylvania at Harrisburg, Williamsport, Bradford, and Erie.

The Martin 2-0-2 operating the flight departed Harrisburg with 26 passengers and crew on board and crashed while maneuvering to land at Williamsport Regional Airport in poor weather. A passenger was the sole survivor. Of the 26 passengers and crew many came from Pennsylvania or other Mid-Atlantic states, however there were two foreign nationals on board: one from France and the other from Lithuania.

The crash was the first fatal accident in the history of Allegheny Airlines and was the deadliest until the 1969 crash of Allegheny Airlines Flight 853. Also the crash was the largest aviation incident in county history, and was the only deadly incident involving Williamsport Regional Airport until the Merion air disaster in 1991.

== Background ==
Flight 371 was scheduled from Philadelphia to Cleveland with stops at Harrisburg, Williamsport, Bradford, and Erie. Flight 371 departed Philadelphia at 08:15 and proceeded under visual flight rules to Harrisburg where it landed at 08:51 without incident. Flight 371 departed Harrisburg at 09:06 with 22 revenue passengers, 4 crew members and 598 pounds of baggage, mail, and cargo.

== Crash ==
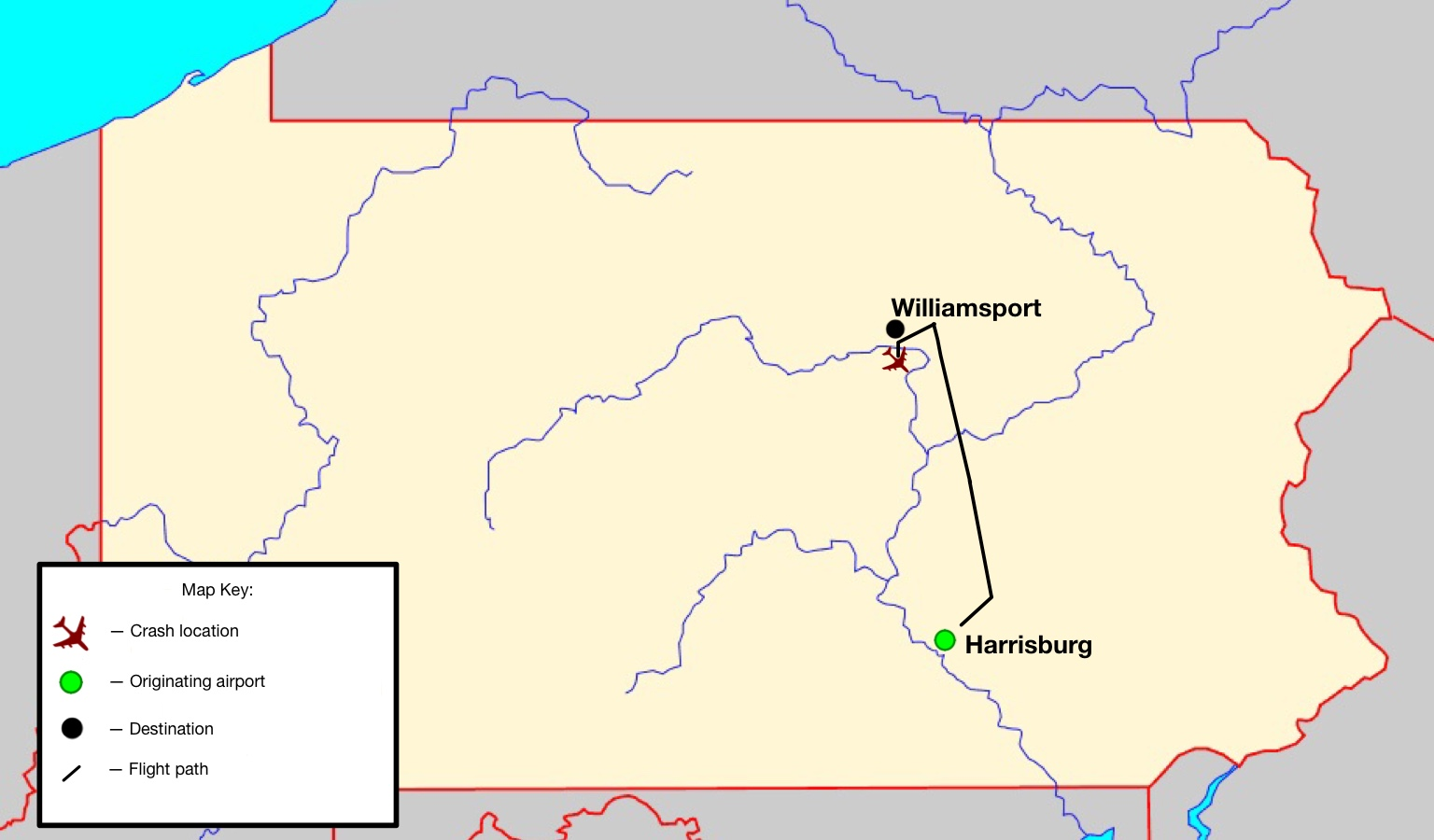

On Tuesday, 1 December 1959 at 09:06 EST (14:06 UTC) Allegheny Airlines Flight 371 departed Harrisburg-York State Airport with 22 revenue passengers, one additional crew member, and 598 pounds of cargo. The gross weight at time of takeoff was 36,429 pounds, which was 2,081 pounds below Maximum takeoff weight (MTOW).

At 09:23 EST Flight 371 reported to Williamsport radio that it was making 360-degree turns five minutes south of the Williamsport low frequency range at an altitude of 3,500 feet, VFR, and requested an instrument clearance to the Williamsport Regional Airport. Williamsport responded by giving 371 airport weather conditions from 09:17 EST. At 09:27 EST 371 was cleared direct to airport from its present position and was to maintain 4,000 feet. At 09:33 EST 371 was cleared for an approach to the Williamsport Airport and to report when on the ground.

At approximately 09:45 EST 371 was observed over the airport, too high however to effect a landing. After this initial approach to the field, 371 flew over the field and made a right turn for a circling approach to runway 27. As this circle was apparently completed, the aircraft was observed to roll out of its right turn and into a left turn and proceed in level flight, on a southerly direction, disappearing into snow showers and clouds. This was observed by an airport employee and the captain of a Capital Airlines Douglas DC-3 holding short of runway 27 awaiting Flight 371's arrival. At about 09:47 EST airport workers heard 371 crash into Bald Eagle Mountain.

=== Rescue ===
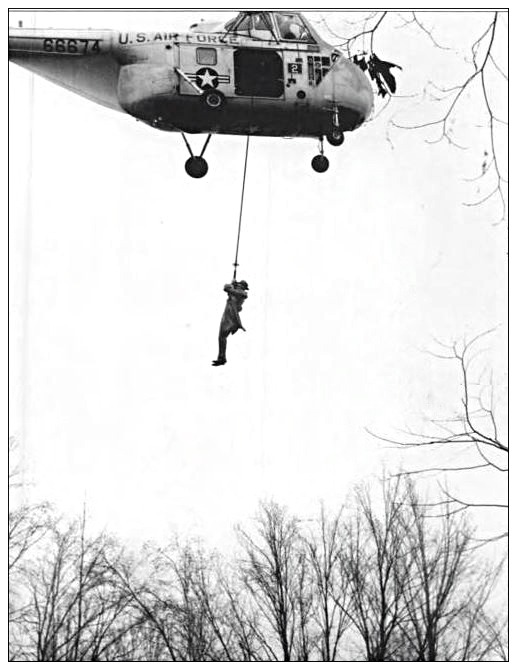
Local doctor Wilfred W. Wilcox lowered to crash site by U.S. Air Force helicopter

Due to the terrain it was hard for authorities from several local fire departments that responded to reach the site; thus, it took would-be rescuers half an hour to reach the crashed aircraft. The site was so hard to get to that a local doctor, Wilfred W. Wilcox, had to be air lifted into the crash scene via a United States Air Force Sikorsky H-19 Chickasaw helicopter and lowered into the site (as seen to the left).

The crash site was very steep, at some locations the grade was near 30 degrees, making movement around the crash site painstakingly slow. Once authorities reached the site at approximately 10:25 a.m. lone survivor was found and given first aid. By noon, the crash site was deemed secure by fire and police officials. By late afternoon all bodies were taken from the crash site.

== Passengers and crew ==
=== Passengers ===
People on board by state or nation of residence
State/Nation	Number
California	1
France	1
Lithuania	1
New York	1
North Carolina	1
Ohio	3
Pennsylvania	16
South Carolina	1
Virginia	1

Sole survivor

Twenty-five people on board were killed, with a manager of a Philadelphia sportswear company who was on a business trip as the only survivor. Two other passengers initially survived but died before they could be transported.

=== Crew members ===
There were 4 crew members on board, 3 pilots and a flight attendant. Captain Thomas Ronald Goldsmith had over 12,000 hours and worked for Allegheny for nine years. Co-pilots George Matthew Bowers was occupying the right hand seat and Donald Winston Tygert was seated in the jump seat. The lone steward was 28 year-old William Thompson Conger Jr.

== Investigation ==
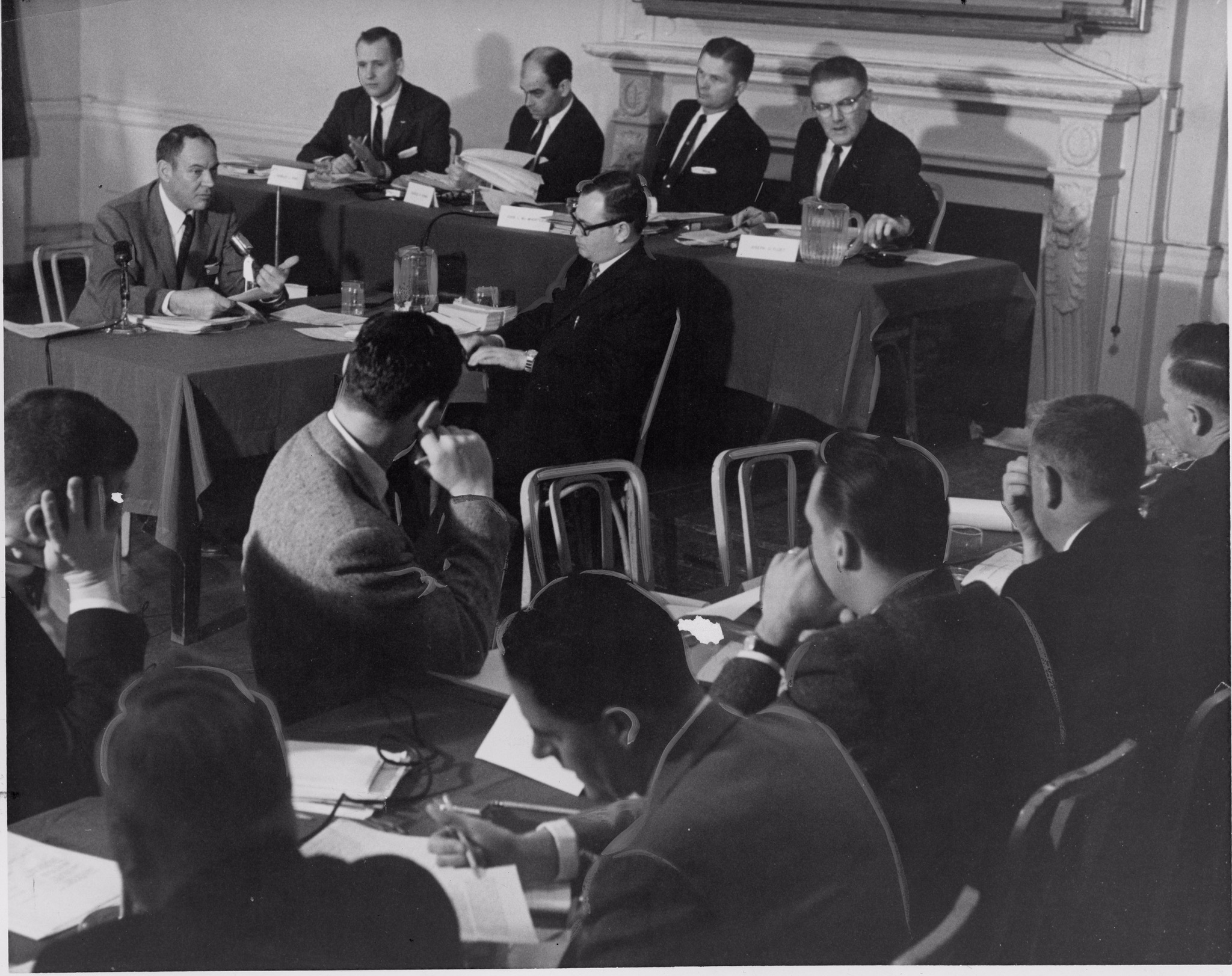
Public hearing pertaining to the crash being held at the Genetti Hotel in January 1960

Aviation crash investigators were called immediately following the crash and arrived on the crash site the following day. The Civil Aeronautics Board opened an investigation on December 2, 1959. Possible causes for the crash released in a pre-investigation interview were that of pilot error, inclement weather conditions, cockpit instrumental or mechanical failure.

On November 8, 1960, the board released its findings saying: "The Board believes that this accident was caused by the captain's failure to execute a timely abandoned approach. The probable accidental caging of the fluxgate compass, which would have resulted in an erroneous heading indication, is considered to be a likely contributing factor."

As a result of the crash from 1961 onward the Federal Aviation Administration required all commercial aircraft to adopt suitable guards on all aircraft that have fluxgate compass caging switches located in a position which would permit inadvertent actuation.

== Legacy ==
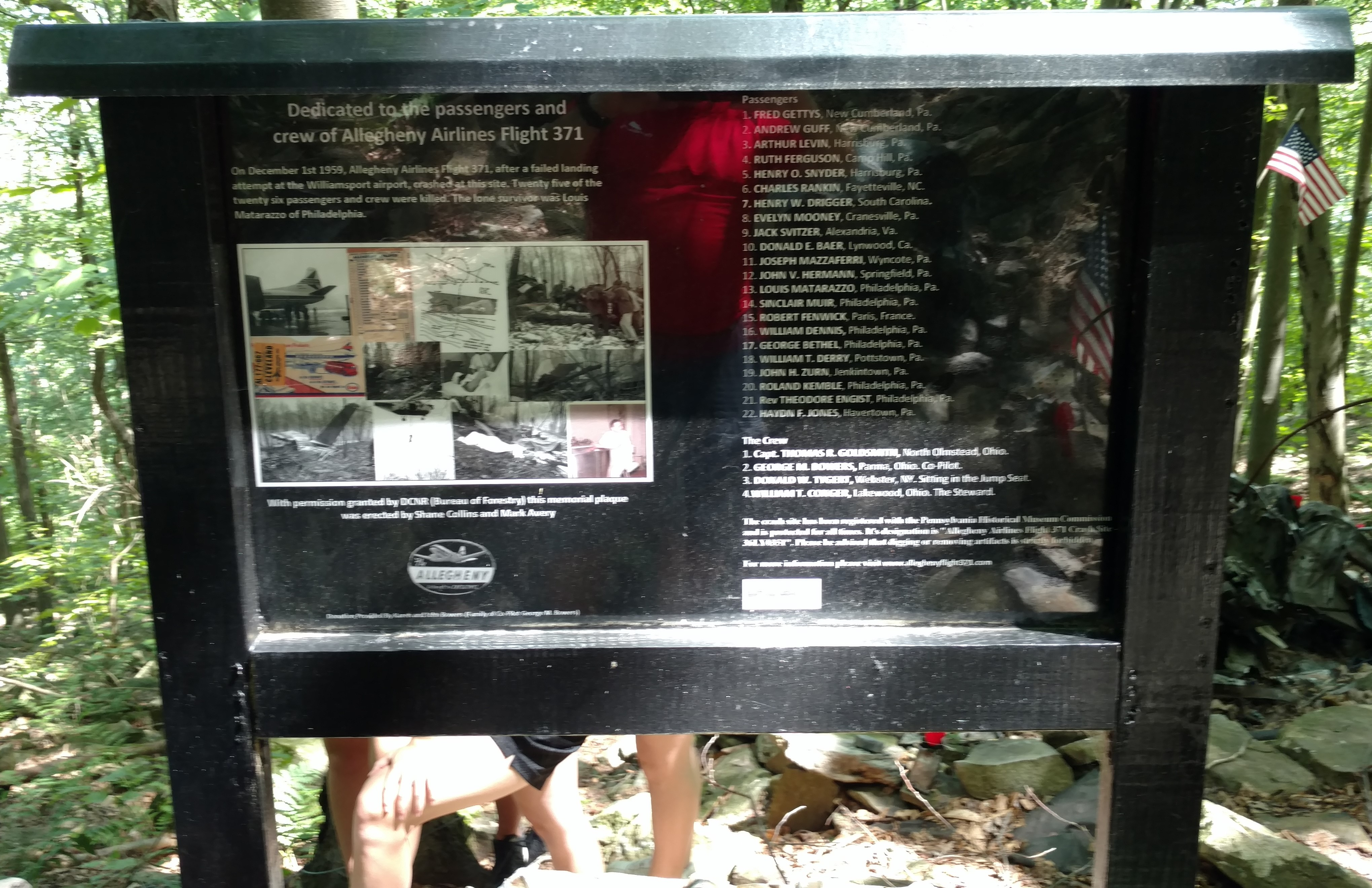
Allegheny Airlines Flight 371 Memorial Plaque

In May 2014, a Williamsport-area resident, Shane Collins, and his cousin, Mark Avery, re-located the Flight 371 crash site on Bald Eagle Mountain using GPS. Robin Van Auken, an archaeology instructor at Lycoming College and a board member of the Northcentral Chapter 8 of the Society for Pennsylvania Archaeology, led efforts resulting in the state Historical and Museum Commission designating the crash site (about the size of a football field) as an official archaeological site. Recovery of artifacts would be difficult as much of the site is on a 67-degree slope.

In October 2016 a memorial plaque was installed at the crash site.

== See also ==
- List of accidents and incidents involving airliners in the United States
